= B13R =

B13R may refer to:

- B13R (virus protein)
- Volvo B13R, an automobile created by the Volvo Buses company
