= Rabbitpox =

Rabbitpox virus

Virus classification
- (unranked): Virus
- Realm: Varidnaviria
- Kingdom: Bamfordvirae
- Phylum: Nucleocytoviricota
- Class: Pokkesviricetes
- Order: Chitovirales
- Family: Poxviridae
- Genus: Orthopoxvirus
- Species: Orthopoxvirus vaccinia
- Virus: Rabbitpox virus

Species of virus

Rabbitpox is a disease of rabbits caused by a virus of the genus Orthopoxvirus in the family Poxviridae, and closely related to vaccinia virus. Rabbitpox was first isolated at the Rockefeller Institute in New York in 1933, following a series of epidemics in the laboratory rabbits. It is an acute disease only known to infect laboratory rabbits as no cases have been reported in wild rabbits; it cannot infect humans.

== History ==
Rabbitpox has not been recognised in wild rabbits, however a few outbreaks have been reported in the USA since 1930.

== Symptoms ==
- Pox lesions may or may not be present on the skin.
- Most rabbits develop a fever and nasal discharge.
- The mortality varies but is always high.
- The most characteristic lesions seen at necropsy are a skin rash, subcutaneous edema, and edema of the mouth and other body openings.

== Infection ==
Rabbitpox virus is a highly infectious airborne agent, which spreads very rapidly through laboratories which contain rabbits causing a high rate of mortality. Because of the edematous condition, “poxless” rabbitpox may be confused with myxomatosis. The virus may be isolated or the infection diagnosed serologically by methods appropriate to vaccinia. Rabbitpox virus is closely related immunologically to vaccinia virus, consequently rabbits that have been inoculated with the smallpox (vaccinia virus) vaccine have immunity against rabbitpox.

== Danger to humans ==
Rabbitpox virus does not infect humans.
