= Suipoxvirus =

Virus classification
- (unranked): Virus
- Realm: Varidnaviria
- Kingdom: Bamfordvirae
- Phylum: Nucleocytoviricota
- Class: Pokkesviricetes
- Order: Chitovirales
- Family: Poxviridae
- Subfamily: Chordopoxvirinae
- Genus: Suipoxvirus

Genus of viruses

Suipoxvirus is a genus of viruses in the family Poxviridae and subfamily Chordopoxvirinae. Swine serve as natural hosts. There is only one species in this genus: Swinepox virus (Suipoxvirus swinepox). Diseases associated with this genus include asymptomatic skin disease.

== Structure ==
Viruses in Suipoxvirus are enveloped, with brick-shaped geometries. Genomes are linear, around 175 kilobases in length.

Genus	Structure	Symmetry	Capsid	Genomic arrangement	Genomic segmentation
Suipoxvirus	Brick-shaped		Enveloped	Linear	Monopartite

== Life cycle ==
Viral replication is cytoplasmic. Entry into the host cell is achieved by attachment of the viral proteins to host glycosaminoglycans (GAGs), which mediates endocytosis of the virus into the host cell. The virion undergoes fusion with the plasma membrane to release the core into the host cytoplasm. Early genes are transcribed in the cytoplasm by viral RNA polymerase. Early expression begins at 30 minutes post-infection. The core is completely uncoated as early expression ends, and the viral genome is now free in the cytoplasm.

Intermediate genes are expressed, triggering genomic DNA replication at approximately 100 minutes post-infection. Late genes are expressed from 140 min to 48 hours post-infection, producing all structural proteins. The assembly of progeny virions starts in cytoplasmic viral factories and produces a spherical, immature particle. This virus particle matures into a brick-shaped, intracellular mature virion (IMV). This IMV virion can be released upon cell lysis, or can acquire a second double membrane from trans-Golgi and bud as external enveloped virion (EEV).

Replication follows the DNA strand displacement model. DNA-templated transcription is the method of transcription. The virus exits the host cell by existing in occlusion bodies after cell death and remaining infectious until finding another host. Swine serve as the natural host.

Genus	Host details	Tissue tropism	Entry details	Release details	Replication site	Assembly site	Transmission
Suipoxvirus	Swine	None	Glycosaminoglycans	Lysis; budding	Cytoplasm	Cytoplasm	Unknown

== Swinepox ==
Swinepox is a worldwide disease of the pig, caused by a virus of the family Poxviridae and the genus Suipoxvirus. It is the most common cause of pox disease in pigs, with Vaccinia virus being the next most common cause of outbreaks. It is a mild to severe disease depending on the louse it was contracted from. Symptoms include papules and pustules on the skin of the abdomen. Characteristic lesions on the lower abdomen have dark hemorrhagic centers. Swinepox is transmitted by direct contact and by the pig louse, Hematopinus suis. Often the hooves go crusty due to the animals water content in its body being used for fighting the infection. This in serious Swine pox cases can cause malformed hoofs and damage the ability for the pig to walk properly. In some extremely rare cases, the genetics of the animal can be changed by this disease but go unnoticed in terms of physical symptoms; this, if contracted by breeding pigs is very threatening for the potential baby piglets to be born. Piglets born from parents that both have the severest strain of the disease will be born frequently with disfigurements such as a tail that is bulbous, and crooked snouts. The inside of the animal is also affected by the genetic strain by making the muscles and fat of the animal pus filled and also weakens the piglets organs over time resulting in death.
