= Analgecine =

Discontinued analgesic

Analgecine (brand name AGC) is discontinued extracts of Vaccinia-inoculated rabbit skin used as an analgesic, that had been approved for the treatment of back pain and neuralgia in China.
