= Henry Austin Martin =

British-American physician

- Born: July 23, 1824; London, England
- Died: December 7, 1884 (aged 60); Lowell, Massachusetts
- Education: Harvard Medical School
- Known for: Smallpox vaccine
- Scientific career
- Fields: Public health

Henry Austin Martin (23 July 1824 – 7 December 1884) was an English-born American medical doctor known for introducing the method of production and use of smallpox vaccine lymph from calves. He was the first American physician to experiment successfully with a vaccine for the bovine virus.

== Early life ==
Martin was born on 23 July 1824 in London, England. His father was Henry James Martin, Esq. M. R. C. S.

Martin graduated from Harvard Medical School with an MD in 1845.

== Career ==
Martin was a staff surgeon with the U. S. Vols and a Brevet Lieutenant Colonel "for gallant and meritorious services" in a wartime campaign.

Martin is best known for standardizing a method of vaccine production from calves that had been used for at least a century, the technique of which was utilized by Aventis-Pasteur. The vaccine was thought to have saved Boston from a potentially catastrophic 1873 epidemic, but he was widely criticized by medical peers and the general public. Human lymph later became illegal in the United States since it no longer provided adequate immunity, and played a role in the 1905 Supreme Court case JACOBSON v. MASSACHUSETTS regarding compulsory vaccination.

Vaccinia virus, a member of the poxvirus family, affected rodents and is believed to have become extinct in the late 1800s. It is a critical component of the modern smallpox vaccine. Survival of the vaccinia is credited to Martin, sons Francis and Stephen, and Martin's lineage of pupils who preserved the virus in a laboratory setting.

Later in his career, Martin was an advocate for bovine vaccines which were thought to preserve potency and mitigate the risk of syphilis transmission. He worked against anti-vaccination activists, and exposed fraudulent manufacturers whose vaccines were both unsafe and ineffective.

He was the Vaccine Committee chair for the American Medical Association.

== Personal life ==
Martin married Francis Coffin Crosby (born 16 Nov 1825). They had the following children:

- Henry Maclean (15 May 1849);
- Stephen Crosby, MD (17 September 1850)
- Austin Agnew, AB, LLB (3 November 1851)
- Frances Moody (3 April 1855; 17 Mar 1857)
- Francis Coffin, AB, MD (22 Mar 1858)

The family is buried in Lowell Cemetery in Lowell, Massachusetts.

== Awards and honors ==
- He is the namesake of Martin's Bandage, as well as Martin's cartilage clamp, Martin incision, Martin vigorimeter, and Martin's Disease (periosteoarthritis of the foot from excessive walking).
- He received an honorary A.M. from Dartmouth.
- Martin's vaccine contribution was commemorated by a historical marker at 27 Dudley Street, in the Roxbury section of Boston
- In 1991, John Joseph Buder's dissertation at the University of Texas was Letters of Henry Austin Martin: The Vaccination Correspondence to Thomas Fanning Wood, 1877-1883.

== Selected publications ==
- Hahnemann and Paracelsus. On Some Ancient Medical Delusions, and Their Connection with Errors Still Existing. An Address Delivered Before the Norfolk District Medical Society, November 11, 1857
- The American Medical Association Vs. Henry A. Martin, M.D., Member of Said Association, and Late Chairman of Its Committee on Vaccination. Rand, Avery, & Fryf, 1871.
- "The India-Rubber Bandage For Ulcers And Other Diseases Of The Legs". The British Medical Journal vol. 2, no. 930 (1878): 624–626.
- “The Solid Rubber Bandage.” The British Medical Journal, vol. 2, no. 937, 1878, pp. 874–874.
- A Few Words on "unfortunate Results of Vaccination".1880.
