= Yatapoxvirus =

Virus classification
- (unranked): Virus
- Realm: Varidnaviria
- Kingdom: Bamfordvirae
- Phylum: Nucleocytoviricota
- Class: Pokkesviricetes
- Order: Chitovirales
- Family: Poxviridae
- Subfamily: Chordopoxvirinae
- Genus: Yatapoxvirus

Genus of viruses

Yatapoxvirus is a genus of viruses, in the family Poxviridae, in the subfamily Chordopoxvirinae. Monkeys and baboons serve as natural hosts. There are two species in this genus. Diseases associated with this genus can cause histiocytomas, tumor-like masses of mononuclear cells.

== Taxonomy ==
The genus contains the following species, listed by scientific name and followed by the exemplar virus of the species:

- Yatapoxvirus tanapox, Tanapox virus
- Yatapoxvirus yabapox, Yaba monkey tumor virus

== Structure ==
Viruses in Yatapoxvirus are enveloped, with brick-shaped geometries. The diameter is around 200 nm. Genomes are linear, around 145kb in length.

| Genus | Structure | Symmetry | Capsid | Genomic arrangement | Genomic segmentation |
|---|---|---|---|---|---|
| Yatapoxvirus | Brick-shaped | | Enveloped | Linear | Monopartite |

== Life cycle ==
Viral replication is cytoplasmic. Entry into the host cell is achieved by attachment of the viral proteins to host glycosaminoglycans (GAGs) mediates endocytosis of the virus into the host cell. Fusion occurs with the plasma membrane to release the core into the host cytoplasm. Early phase: early genes are transcribed in the cytoplasm by viral RNA polymerase. Early expression begins at 30 minutes post-infection. The core is completely uncoated as early expression ends, and the viral genome is now free in the cytoplasm. Intermediate phase: the intermediate genes are expressed, triggering genomic DNA replication at approximately 100 minutes post-infection. Late phase: the late genes are expressed from 140 min to 48 hours post-infection, producing all structural proteins. Assembly of progeny virions starts in cytoplasmic viral factories, producing a spherical immature particle. This virus particle matures into brick-shaped intracellular mature virion (IMV). IMV virions can be released upon cell lysis, or can acquire a second double membrane from trans-Golgi and bud as external enveloped virion (EEV) host receptors, which mediates endocytosis. Replication follows the DNA strand displacement model. DNA-templated transcription is the method of transcription. The virus exits the host cell by existing in occlusion bodies after cell death and remaining infectious until finding another host. Monkeys and baboons serve as the natural host. Transmission routes are mechanical and contact.

| Genus | Host details | Tissue tropism | Entry details | Release details | Replication site | Assembly site | Transmission |
|---|---|---|---|---|---|---|---|
| Yatapoxvirus | Monkeys; baboons | None | Glycosaminoglycans | Lysis; budding | Cytoplasm | Cytoplasm | Contact; insects |
