= Roseola vaccinia =

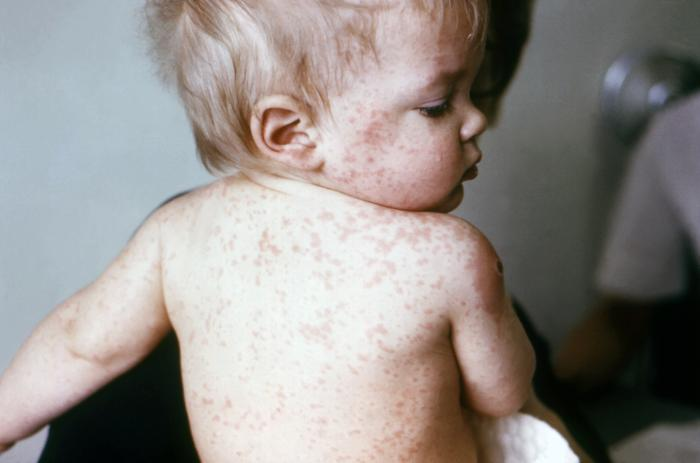
- Child diagnosed with roseola vaccinia
- Specialty: Dermatology, Infectious Diseases, Pediatrics
- Complications: Fever and fatigue
- Duration: 3-4 days
- Causes: Hypersensitivity reaction to smallpox vaccination
- Diagnostic method: Clinical based on features
- Differential diagnosis: Erythema multiforme, Stevens–Johnson Syndrome, eczema vaccinatum, toxic erythema, and postvaccinia urticaria
- Treatment: Symptomatic

Roseola vaccinia, also known as generalized vaccinia, erythema vaccinatum, or vaccine-associated smallpox rash, is a self-limiting, cutaneous condition characterized by a sudden eruption of a rash following the smallpox vaccination injection.

== Etiology and pathophysiology ==
Roseola vaccinia has been suggested to be a hypersensitive, benign reaction to the smallpox vaccination rather than a true infection.

Roseola vaccinia should be distinguished from other skin complications from the smallpox vaccination including erythema multiforme, Stevens–Johnson Syndrome, eczema vaccinatum, toxic erythema, and postvaccinia urticaria based on cutaneous appearance and severity with systemic involvement.

== Epidemiology ==
Roseola vaccinia is considered a rare complication with approximately 23.4–238.2 cases per million primary vaccinees historically when the smallpox vaccination was administered.

== Clinical diagnosis and features ==
Roseola vaccinia is diagnosed clinically based on history of recent smallpox immunization with observation of the characteristic rash. Laboratory tests or biopsies are rarely indicated for diagnosis. Roseola vaccinia often manifests within two weeks of vaccine administration. The rash may be diffuse, maculopapular, erythematous rash distributed over the trunk, limbs, or face or a collection of lesions present at the immunization injection site. Other symptoms associated with the rash include fever and fatigue.

== Management ==
Treatment and management of the vaccination complication is generally supportive as the rash is self-limiting and will resolve within three to four days without extensive interventions. Interventions to consider may be anti-histamines for itch relief and ibuprofen or acetaminophen for fever relief.

== History of smallpox vaccination ==
The smallpox vaccination is a live vaccination derived from the vaccinia virus, which is a viral family of poxvirus. The smallpox vaccination does not carry any variant of the smallpox virus, the variola virus. The smallpox vaccine is no longer recommended for the general public and no longer considered a routine vaccination for children due to the global eradication of smallpox in 1980. The vaccine is available only through the Centers for Disease Control and Prevention and will be distributed in the setting of a smallpox outbreak.

== See also ==
- Vaccinia
- Skin lesion
