= Crocodylidpoxvirus =

Virus classification
- (unranked): Virus
- Realm: Varidnaviria
- Kingdom: Bamfordvirae
- Phylum: Nucleocytoviricota
- Class: Pokkesviricetes
- Order: Chitovirales
- Family: Poxviridae
- Subfamily: Chordopoxvirinae
- Genus: Crocodylidpoxvirus

Species
- Crocodylidpoxvirus nilecrocodilepox

Genus of viruses

Crocodylidpoxvirus is a genus of viruses, in the family Poxviridae, in the subfamily Chordopoxvirinae. Crocodiles serve as natural hosts. There is only one species in this genus: Nile crocodilepox virus (Crocodylidpoxvirus nilecrocodilepox). Diseases associated with this genus include: nodular skin lesions in young animals. Symptoms vary from a nonfatal dermatitis to more severe disease characterized by ophthalmia, rhinitis resulting in asphyxia, and debilitating illness with stunting and high mortality.

== Structure ==
Viruses in Crocodylidpoxvirus are enveloped, with ovoid geometries. These viruses are about 140-170 nm wide and 220-300 nm long. Genomes are linear, around 190kb in length.

| Genus | Structure | Symmetry | Capsid | Genomic arrangement | Genomic segmentation |
|---|---|---|---|---|---|
| Crocodylidpoxvirus | Ovoid | | Enveloped | Linear | Monopartite |

== Life cycle ==
Viral replication is cytoplasmic. Entry into the host cell is achieved by attachment of the viral proteins to host glycosaminoglycans (GAGs) mediates endocytosis of the virus into the host cell. Fusion with the plasma membrane to release the core into the host cytoplasm. Early phase: early genes are transcribed in the cytoplasm by viral RNA polymerase. Early expression begins at 30 minutes post-infection. Core is completely uncoated as early expression ends, viral genome is now free in the cytoplasm. Intermediate phase: Intermediate genes are expressed, triggering genomic DNA replication at approximately 100 minutes post-infection. Late phase: Late genes are expressed from 140 min to 48 hours post-infection, producing all structural proteins. Assembly of progeny virions starts in cytoplasmic viral factories, producing a spherical immature particle. This virus particle matures into brick-shaped intracellular mature virion (IMV). IMV virion can be released upon cell lysis, or can acquire a second double membrane from trans-Golgi and bud as external enveloped virion (EEV) host receptors, which mediates endocytosis. Replication follows the DNA strand displacement model. DNA-templated transcription is the method of transcription. The virus exits the host cell by existing in occlusion bodies after cell death and remaining infectious until finding another host. Crocodiles serve as the natural host. Transmission routes are zoonosis and contact.

| Genus | Host details | Tissue tropism | Entry details | Release details | Replication site | Assembly site | Transmission |
|---|---|---|---|---|---|---|---|
| Crocodylidpoxvirus | Crocodiles | None | Glycosaminoglycans | Lysis; budding | Cytoplasm | Cytoplasm | Unknown |
