= Progressive vaccinia =

- Other names: Vaccinia gangrenosum, Vaccinia necrosum or disseminated vaccinia
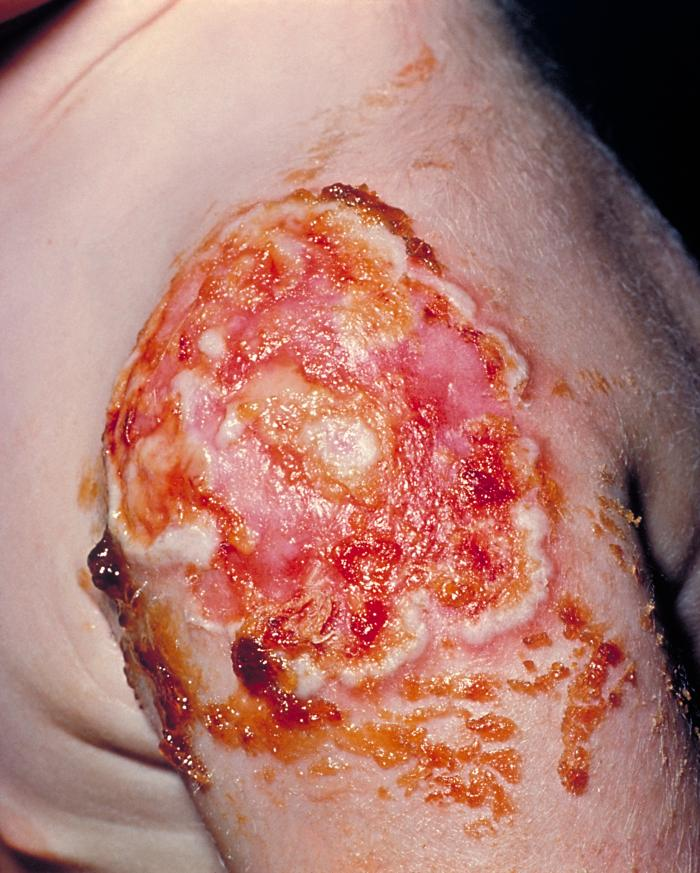
- The patient required a skin graft on her upper left arm in order to correct the necrotic vaccination site, due to the onset of progressive vaccinia, formerly known as vaccinia gangrenosum.
- Specialty: Dermatology
- Symptoms: Malaise, fever, vomiting and tender, enlarged axillary lymph nodes; progresses to septic Pseudomonas aeruginosa, likely from a perirectal abscess, Clostridioides difficile (bacteria), Staphylococcus aureus and cell-mediated immunodeficiency.
- Complications: Necrosis of the injected part, exacerbating to gangrene and eventual amputation. Usually, the pocks tend to go away without scarring; however, the external and internal spread of the virus may have serious consequences in persons with eczema and other forms of atopic dermatitis, in these persons, defects of innate immunity and a high level of Th2 cell activity render the skin unusually permissive to the initiation and rapid spread of vaccinia infection (known as “eczema vaccinatum”)
- Usual onset: 11 days to 6.5 weeks
- Duration: Long-lasting
- Causes: Injection by the vaccinia virus (genus: orthopoxvirus) as a countermeasure for smallpox
- Risk factors: People with cellular immunodeficiencies
- Diagnostic method: Fever and headache, then progressive ulceration and necrosis of the injection site for smallpox, albeit the lack of inflammation is noted as the "hallmark of PV"
- Differential diagnosis: May initially be mistaken for leukemia
- Prevention: Unknown
- Treatment: Vaccinia Immune Globulin Intravenous (Human) (VIGIV), Emergency Investigational New Drug (E-IND) both administered orally and topically, (in this case ST-246); CMX001, a lipid conjugate of cidofovir and granulocyte colony-stimulating factor for the exiguous normal white blood cells;supportive care; skin graft
- Medication: Imiquimod, and thiosemicarbazone
- Prognosis: Lifelong
- Frequency: every 1 or 2 in a million during routine vaccination during 1963-1968 for smallpox
- Deaths: fatality rate: 15%

Progressive vaccinia is a rare cutaneous condition caused by the vaccinia virus, characterized by painless but progressive necrosis and ulceration.

== Presentation ==
=== Complications ===
Opportunistic fungal, protozoal, or bacterial infections and the vaccinia virus itself may lead to septic shock and disseminated intravascular coagulation, in addition to necrosis and ulcerated skin tissue. Some of these tissues may eventually become large, requiring not only a skin graft but surgical removal of the destroyed tissue, in order to prevent graft-versus-host disease in patients transplanted of organs, in whom immunosuppressive therapy would otherwise have to be discontinued to allow healing of the wound.

== Pathophysiology ==
Vaccinia is introduced into the skin by means of multiple punctures of a bifurcated needle. The virus replicates in the basal layer and disseminates from cell to cell, causing necrosis and the formation of fluid-filled vesicles. Nonetheless, the initial spread of the virus is slowed by innate antiviral mechanisms, and, by the second week, the cell-mediated immune response begins to eliminate infected cells (Note: Immunosuppressed individuals tend to have a larger fatality rate and tendency to get the virus due to HIV infection, iatrogenic immunosuppression, etc. Although these conditions are contraindications to the dermovaccine, inadvertent inoculation after contact with a vaccinee may occur; in layman's terms, inoculation means the introduction of a pathogen or antigen into a living organism to stimulate the production of antibodies. Due to the impaired immune response of the host, the virus multiplies by cell-to-cell spread at the inoculation site, and the lesion expands circumferentially, forming the trademark symptoms called "pocks".). Neutrophils, macrophages, and lymphocytes infiltrate the inoculation site, forming a confluent pustule and releasing cytokines and chemokines that cause hyperemia and edema in surrounding tissues. This may initially manifest into complaints of malaise and other mild constitutional symptoms, fever, vomiting, and tender enlarged axillary lymph nodes. Some vaccinees develop additional local “satellite” pustules that resolve along with the primary lesion.

The virus may gain access to the blood at an early stage, and secondary skin lesions, which follow the same evolution as the inoculation site, may appear across the body. Bacteria, like Staphylococcus aureus, may infect the ulcerated, and necrotic lesions. Coalescent lesions may cover large portions of the body with extensive tissue destruction. Although some vaccinia viruses commonly disseminate through the bloodstream, the NYCBOH strain reportedly causes only limited viremia in a small percentage of recipients during the period of pustule formation. The inflammatory process reaches its peak by days 10–12 after vaccination and begins to resolve by day 14, with the shedding of the scab and other pustules by day 21. This sequence of events, which simulates the development of smallpox "pock", is known as a “take” reaction. A successful "take" is required for the development of antivaccinia antibody and cell-mediated responses.

== Treatment ==
In addition to a skin graft, some medications also work. Among antiviral substances, cidofovir showed some effect in preliminary studies. Apart from treating opportunistic infections with anti-viral, and antibiotic medications, for HIV or immunocompromised (or at the very least iatrogenic immunosuppression like cancer and autoimmune disease) people, immediate highly active antiretroviral therapy (HAART) in HIV patients and withdrawal of immunosuppressive therapy accompanied by aggressive administration of VIG are given to save the patient's life. Intensive care and supportive treatment are required. VIG is given at up to 10 ml / kg body weight.

== See also ==
- Vaccinia
- Skin lesion
- Necrosis
- Smallpox
- Vaccination
- Chicken pox
- Cowpox- a virus closely related to the vaccinia virus and belongs to the same genus Orthopoxvirus.
