= Cervidpoxvirus =

Virus classification
- (unranked): Virus
- Realm: Varidnaviria
- Kingdom: Bamfordvirae
- Phylum: Nucleocytoviricota
- Class: Pokkesviricetes
- Order: Chitovirales
- Family: Poxviridae
- Subfamily: Chordopoxvirinae
- Genus: Cervidpoxvirus

Genus of viruses

Cervidpoxvirus is a genus of viruses in the family Poxviridae in the subfamily Chordopoxvirinae. Deer serve as natural hosts. Only one species is in this genus: Mule deerpox virus (Cervidpoxvirus muledeerpox).

== Structure ==
Viruses in Cervidpoxvirus are enveloped, with brick-shaped geometries. Genomes are linear, around 154 kb in length.

== Lifecycle ==
Viral replication is cytoplasmic. Entry into the host cell is achieved by attachment of the viral proteins to host glycosaminoglycans, which mediate endocytosis of the virus into the host cell. Fusion with the plasma membrane releases the core into the host cytoplasm. In the early phase, early genes are transcribed in the cytoplasm by viral RNA polymerase. Early expression begins at 30 minutes after infection. The core is completely uncoated as early expression ends, and the viral genome is now free in the cytoplasm. In the intermediate phase, intermediate genes are expressed, triggering genomic DNA replication about 100 minutes after infection. In the late phase, late genes are expressed from 140 min to 48 hours postinfection, producing all structural proteins. Assembly of progeny virions starts in cytoplasmic viral factories, producing spherical immature particles. These particles mature into brick-shaped intracellular mature virions, which can be released upon cell lysis, or can acquire a second double membrane from trans-Golgi and bud as external enveloped virion host receptors, which mediate endocytosis. Replication follows the DNA strand displacement model. DNA-templated transcription is the method of transcription. The virus exits the host cell by existing in occlusion bodies after cell death and remaining infectious until finding another host. Deer serve as the natural host.
