= Molluscum contagiosum =

Viral infection of the skin

- Other names: Water warts
- Typical flesh-colored, dome-shaped and pearly lesions
- Specialty: Dermatology
- Symptoms: Small, raised, pink lesions with a dimple in the center
- Usual onset: Children 1 to 10 years of age
- Duration: Usually 6–12 months, may last up to four years
- Types: MCV-1, MCV-2, MCV-3, MCV-4
- Causes: Molluscum contagiosum virus spread by direct contact or contaminated objects
- Risk factors: Weak immune system, atopic dermatitis, crowded living conditions
- Diagnostic method: Based on appearance
- Differential diagnosis: Warts, herpes simplex, chickenpox, folliculitis
- Prevention: Hand washing, not sharing personal items
- Treatment: None, freezing, opening up the lesion and scraping the inside, laser therapy
- Medication: Podophyllotoxin
- Frequency: 122 million / 1.8% (2010)

Molluscum contagiosum (MC), sometimes called water warts, is a viral infection of the skin that results in small raised pink lesions with a dimple in the center. They may become itchy or sore, and occur singularly or in groups. Any area of the skin may be affected, with abdomen, legs, arms, neck, genital area, and face being the most common. Onset of the lesions is around seven weeks after infection. They usually go away within a year without scarring.

The infection is caused by a poxvirus called the molluscum contagiosum virus (MCV). The virus is spread either by direct contact, including sexual activity, or via contaminated objects such as towels. The condition can also be spread to other areas of the body by the person themselves. Risk factors include a weak immune system, atopic dermatitis, and crowded living conditions. Following one infection, it is possible to get re-infected. Diagnosis is typically based on the appearance of the lesions.

Prevention includes hand washing and not sharing personal items. While treatment is not necessary, some may wish to have the lesions removed for cosmetic reasons or to prevent spread. Removal may occur with freezing, laser therapy, or opening up the lesion and scraping the inside. Scraping the lesion can, however, result in scarring. The oral medication cimetidine, or podophyllotoxin cream applied to the skin, may also be used for treatment.

Approximately 122 million people globally were affected by molluscum contagiosum as of 2010 (1.8% of the population). It is more common in children between the ages of one and ten years old. The condition has become more common in the United States since 1966.

== Signs and symptoms ==
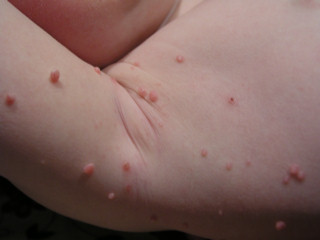
Molluscum lesions on an arm

Molluscum contagiosum lesions are flesh-colored, dome-shaped, and pearly in appearance. They are often 1–5 mm in diameter, with a dimpled center. Molluscum lesions are most commonly found on the face, arms, legs, torso, and armpits in children. Adults typically have molluscum lesions in the genital region, and this is considered to be a sexually transmitted infection; because of this, if genital lesions are found on a child, sexual abuse should be suspected. These lesions are generally not painful, but they may itch or become irritated. Picking or scratching the bumps may lead to a spread of the viral infection responsible for molluscum contagiosum, an additional bacterial infection, and scarring. In some cases, eczema develops around the lesions.

Individual molluscum lesions may resolve on their own within two months and generally clear completely without treatment or scarring in six to twelve months. Mean durations for an outbreak are variously reported from eight to about 18 months, but durations are reported as widely as six months to five years, lasting longer in immunosuppressed individuals.

== Transmission ==
As the name implies, Molluscum contagiosum is extremely contagious. Transmission of the virus can occur many different ways, including direct skin contact (e.g., contact sports or sexual activity), contact with an infected surface (fomite), or autoinoculation (self-infection) by scratching or picking molluscum lesions and then touching other parts of the skin not previously affected by the virus. Children are particularly susceptible to autoinoculation and may have widespread clusters of lesions. The viral infection is limited to a localized area on the topmost layer of the superficial layer of the skin.

== Diagnosis ==
Histologically, molluscum contagiosum is characterized by molluscum bodies (also known as Henderson-Patterson bodies) in the epidermis, above the stratum basale, which consist of cells with abundant large granular eosinophilic cytoplasmic inclusion bodies (accumulated virions) and a small nucleus that has been pushed to the periphery.

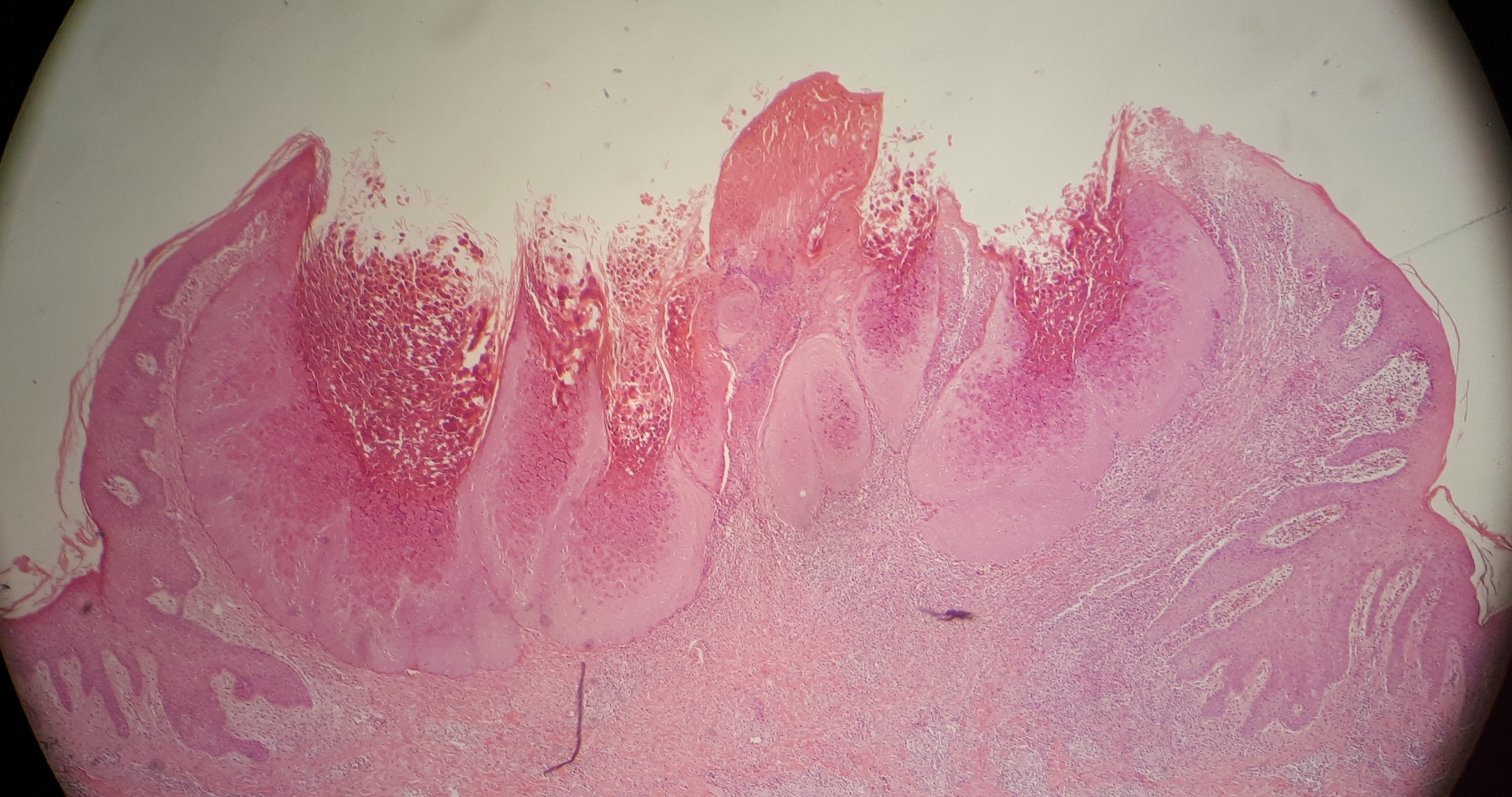
Low magnification micrograph of a molluscum contagiosum lesion

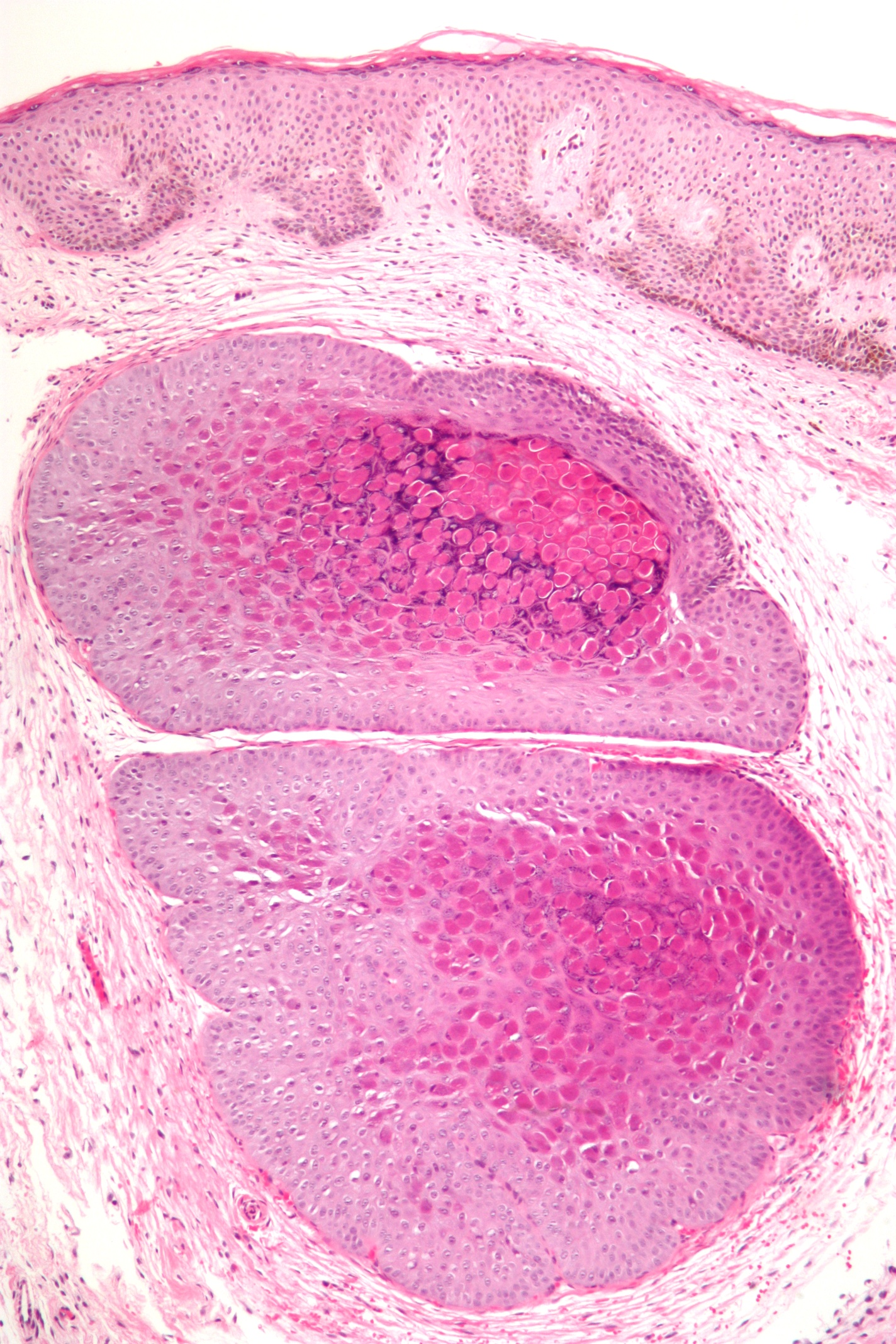
Low-magnification micrograph of molluscum contagiosum, H&E stain

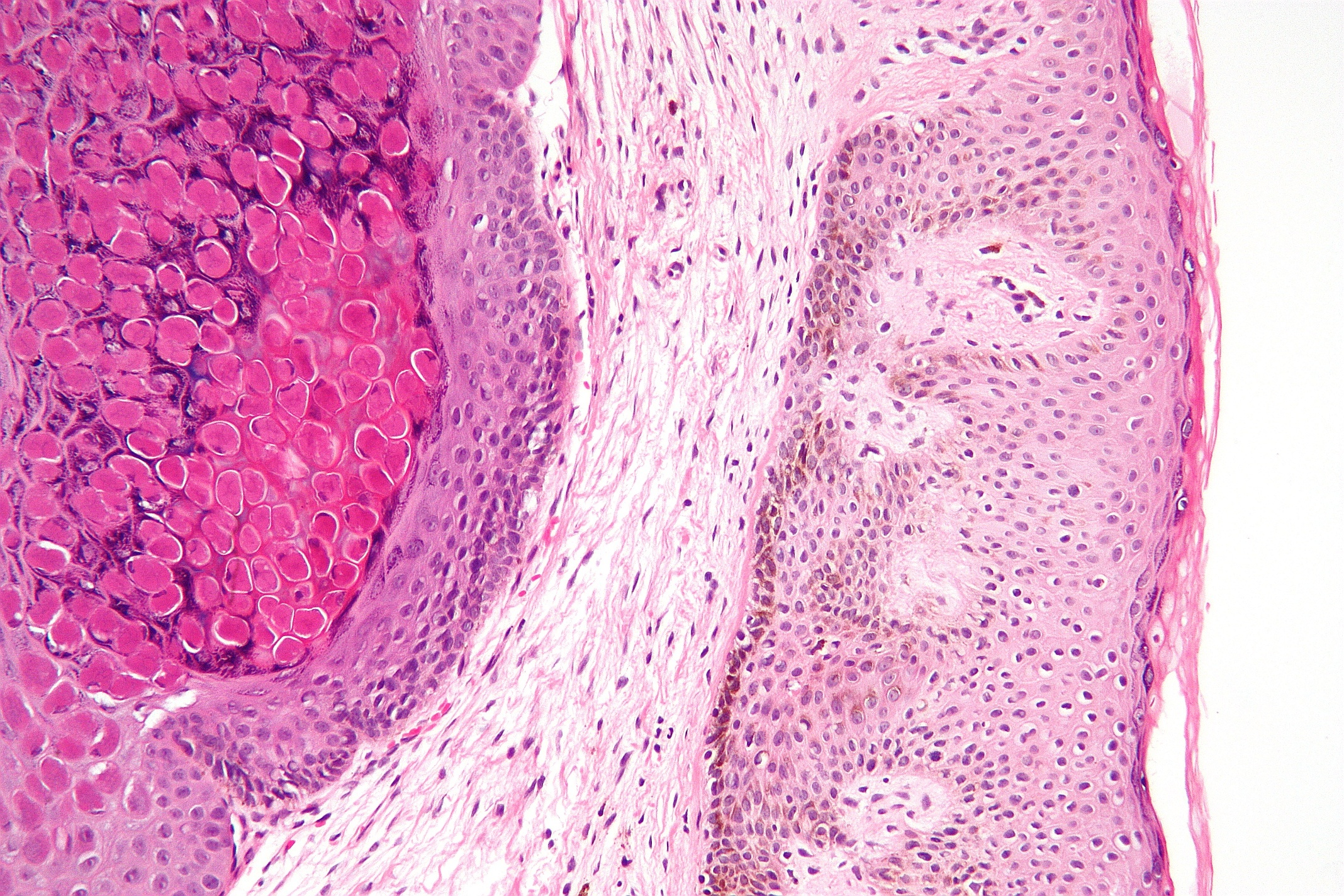
High-magnification micrograph of molluscum contagiosum, showing the characteristic molluscum bodies, H&E stain

== Management ==
Because molluscum contagiosum usually resolves without treatment and treatment options can cause discomfort to children, initial recommendations are often to wait for the lesions to resolve on their own. Of the treatments available, a meta-analysis of randomized controlled trials suggested that there is no difference between treatments in short term improvement, and no single treatment is significantly better than natural resolution of the condition.

Bumps located in the genital area may be treated to prevent them from spreading. When treatment has resulted in the elimination of all bumps, the infection has been effectively cured and will not reappear unless the person is reinfected.

=== Medications ===
For mild cases, over-the-counter topical medication, such as potassium hydroxide, may provide a modest benefit. There is limited evidence for other topical agents including salicylic acid, benzoyl peroxide, and tretinoin, but none of these agents are recommended over the others to shorten infection duration.

Studies have found cantharidin to be an effective and safe treatment for removing molluscum contagiosum. This medication is usually well tolerated, though mild side effects such as pain or blistering are common. There is no high-quality evidence for cimetidine. However, oral cimetidine has been used as an alternative treatment for the pediatric population as it is generally well tolerated and less invasive.

==== Berdazimer sodium ====
Berdazimer sodium, sold under the brand name Zelsuvmi, is a medication used for the treatment for molluscum contagiosum. Berdazimer sodium is a nitric oxide releasing agent. It is a polymer formed from sodium 1-hydroxy-3-methyl-3-(3-(trimethoxysilyl)propyl)-1-triazene-2-oxide and tetraethyl silicate.

The most common side effects occurred at the drug application site including pain, rash, itch, eczema, swelling, erosion, discoloration, blister, irritation, and infection. Other common side effects included fever, vomiting, and upper respiratory infections (common cold).

Berdazimer sodium was approved for medical use in the United States in January 2024. The US Food and Drug Administration (FDA) considers it to be a first-in-class medication.

==== Imiquimod ====
Imiquimod is a form of immunotherapy initially proposed as a treatment for molluscum based on promising results in small case series and clinical trials. However, two large randomized controlled trials, specifically requested by the U.S. Food and Drug Administration under the Best Pharmaceuticals for Children Act both demonstrated that imiquimod cream applied three times per week was no more effective than placebo cream for treating molluscum after 18 weeks of treatment in a total of 702 children aged 2–12 years. In 2007, results from those trials—which remain unpublished—were incorporated into FDA-approved prescribing information for imiquimod, which states: "Limitations of Use: Efficacy was not demonstrated for molluscum contagiosum in children aged 2–12." In 2007, the FDA also updated imiquimod's label concerning safety issues raised in the two large trials and an FDA-requested pharmacokinetic study (the latter of which was published). The updated safety label reads as follows:

- Potential adverse effects of imiquimod use: "Similar to the studies conducted in adults, the most frequently reported adverse reaction from 2 studies in children with molluscum contagiosum was application site reaction. Adverse events that occurred more frequently in Aldara-treated subjects compared with vehicle-treated subjects generally resembled those seen in studies in indications approved for adults and also included otitis media (5% Aldara vs. 3% vehicle) and conjunctivitis (3% Aldara vs. 2% vehicle). Erythema was the most frequently reported local skin reaction. Severe local skin reactions reported by Aldara-treated subjects in the pediatric studies included erythema (28%), edema (8%), scabbing/crusting (5%), flaking/scaling (5%), erosion (2%), and weeping/exudate (2%)."
- Potential systemic absorption of imiquimod, with negative effects on white blood cell counts overall, and specifically neutrophil counts: "Among the 20 subjects with evaluable laboratory assessments, the median WBC count decreased by 1.4×10^{9}/L and the median absolute neutrophil count decreased by 1.42×10^{9} L^{−1}."

=== Surgery ===
Surgical treatments include cryosurgery, in which liquid nitrogen is used to freeze and destroy lesions, as well as scraping them off with a curette. The application of liquid nitrogen may cause burning or stinging at the treated site, which may persist for a few minutes after the treatment. With liquid nitrogen, a blister may form at the treatment site, but it sloughs off in two to four weeks. Cryosurgery and curette scraping can be painful procedures and can result in residual scarring.

=== Laser ===
A 2014 systematic review of case reports and case series concluded that the limited available data suggest pulsed dye laser therapy is a safe and effective treatment for molluscum contagiosum and is generally well tolerated by children. Side effects seen with pulsed dye laser therapy included mild temporary pain at the site of therapy, bruising (lasting up to 2–3 weeks), and temporary discoloration of the treated skin (as long as 1–6 months). No cases of permanent scarring have been reported. As of 2009, however, there is no evidence for genital lesions.

== Prognosis ==
Most cases of molluscum contagiosum will clear up naturally within two years (usually within nine months). So long as the skin growths are present, there is a possibility of transmitting the infection to another person. When the growths are gone, the possibility of spreading the infection ends.

Unlike herpes viruses, which can remain inactive in the body for months or years before reappearing, molluscum contagiosum does not remain in the body when the growths are gone from the skin and will not reappear on its own.
