= Entomopoxvirinae =

Virus classification
- (unranked): Virus
- Realm: Varidnaviria
- Kingdom: Bamfordvirae
- Phylum: Nucleocytoviricota
- Class: Pokkesviricetes
- Order: Chitovirales
- Family: Poxviridae
- Subfamily: Entomopoxvirinae

Genera
- Alphaentomopoxvirus; Betaentomopoxvirus; Deltaentomopoxvirus; Epsilonentomopoxvirus

Subfamily of viruses

Entomopoxvirinae is a subfamily of viruses, in the family Poxviridae. Insects and arthropods serve as natural hosts. The subfamily contains 4 genera. Diseases associated with this subfamily include: impairment of motility and development.

== Structure ==
The virions are generally enveloped though the intracellular mature virion form of the virus, which contains a different envelope, is also infectious. They vary in their shape depending upon the species but are generally shaped like a brick or as an oval form similar to a rounded brick because they are wrapped by the endoplasmic reticulum. The genome is exceptionally large, around 250-380kb in length and the virion diameter is around 350 nm. It carries its genome in a single, linear, double-stranded segment of DNA.

== Life cycle ==
Viral replication is cytoplasmic. Entry into the host cell is achieved by attachment of the viral proteins to host glycosaminoglycans (GAGs) mediates endocytosis of the virus into the host cell. Fusion with the plasma membrane to release the core into the host cytoplasm. Early phase: early genes are transcribed in the cytoplasm by viral RNA polymerase. Early expression begins at 30 minutes post-infection. Core is completely uncoated as early expression ends, viral genome is now free in the cytoplasm. Intermediate phase: Intermediate genes are expressed, triggering genomic DNA replication at approximately 100 minutes post-infection. Late phase: Late genes are expressed from 140 min to 48 hours post-infection, producing all structural proteins. Assembly of progeny virions starts in cytoplasmic viral factories, producing a spherical immature particle. This virus particle matures into brick-shaped intracellular mature virion (IMV). IMV virion can be released upon cell lysis, or can acquire a second double membrane from trans-Golgi and bud as external enveloped virion (EEV). Mature virion can be occluded in spheroids composed of spheroidin proteinhost receptors, which mediates endocytosis. Replication follows the DNA strand displacement model. DNA-templated transcription is the method of transcription. The virus exits the host cell by existing in occlusion bodies after cell death and remaining infectious until finding another host. Insects and arthropods serve as the natural host.

== Taxonomy ==
The classification in this subfamily is based on the morphology, nucleic acid type, mode of replication, host organisms and the type of disease caused.

- The species of the genus Alphaentomopoxvirus infect beetles.
- The species of the genus Betaentomopoxvirus infect butterflies, moths, grasshoppers and locusts.

The following genera are recognized:

- Alphaentomopoxvirus
- Betaentomopoxvirus
- Deltaentomopoxvirus
- Epsilonentomopoxvirus
