= Generalized vaccinia =

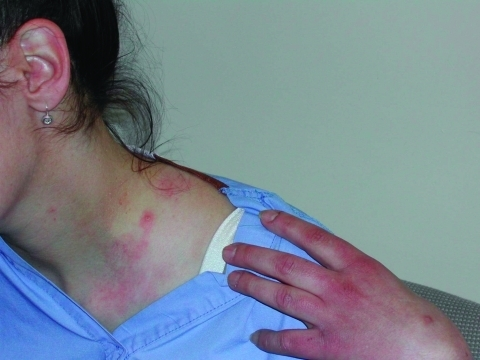
- Pustular lesion on patient’s shoulder, 6 days after revaccination.
- Specialty: Dermatology

Generalized vaccinia is a cutaneous condition that occurs 6 to 9 days after vaccination, characterized by a generalized eruption of skin lesions, and caused by the vaccinia virus.

== See also ==
- Vaccinia
- Skin lesion
