= Betaentomopoxvirus =

Virus classification
- (unranked): Virus
- Realm: Varidnaviria
- Kingdom: Bamfordvirae
- Phylum: Nucleocytoviricota
- Class: Pokkesviricetes
- Order: Chitovirales
- Family: Poxviridae
- Subfamily: Entomopoxvirinae
- Genus: Betaentomopoxvirus

Genus of viruses

Betaentomopoxvirus is a genus of viruses, in the family Poxviridae, in the subfamily Entomopoxvirinae. Lepidoptera and orthoptera insects serve as natural hosts. There are six species in this genus.

== Taxonomy ==
The genus contains the following species, listed by scientific name and followed by the exemplar virus of the species:

- Betaentomopoxvirus ahonmai, Adoxophyes honmai entomopoxvirus
- Betaentomopoxvirus amoorei, Amsacta moorei entomopoxvirus
- Betaentomopoxvirus cbiennis, Choristoneura biennis entomopoxvirus
- Betaentomopoxvirus cfumiferana, Choristoneura fumiferana entomopoxvirus
- Betaentomopoxvirus crosaceana, Choristoneura rosaceana entomopoxvirus
- Betaentomopoxvirus mseparata, Mythimna separata entomopoxvirus

== Structure ==
Viruses in Betaentomopoxvirus are enveloped, with ovoid geometries. The diameter is around 250 nm. Genomes are linear, around 225kb in length.

Genus	Structure	Symmetry	Capsid	Genomic arrangement	Genomic segmentation
Betaentomopoxvirus	Ovoid		Enveloped	Linear	Monopartite

== Life cycle ==
Viral replication is cytoplasmic. Entry into the host cell is achieved by attachment of the viral proteins to host glycosaminoglycans (GAGs) mediates endocytosis of the virus into the host cell. Fusion with the plasma membrane to release the core into the host cytoplasm. Early phase: early genes are transcribed in the cytoplasm by viral RNA polymerase. Early expression begins at 30 minutes post-infection. A Core is completely uncoated as early expression ends, the viral genome is now free in the cytoplasm. Intermediate phase: Intermediate genes are expressed, triggering genomic DNA replication at approximately 100 minutes post-infection. Late phase: Late genes are expressed from 140 min to 48 hours post-infection, producing all structural proteins. Assembly of progeny virions starts in cytoplasmic viral factories, producing a spherical immature particle. This virus particle matures into a brick-shaped intracellular mature virion (IMV). IMV virion can be released upon cell lysis, or can acquire a second double membrane from trans-Golgi and bud as external enveloped virion (EEV). Mature virion can be occluded in spheroids composed of spheroid in protein host receptors, which mediates endocytosis. Replication follows the DNA strand displacement model. DNA-templated transcription is the method of transcription. The virus exits the host cell by existing in occlusion bodies after cell death and remaining infectious until finding another host. Lepidoptera and orthoptera insects serve as the natural host.

Genus	Host details	Tissue tropism	Entry details	Release details	Replication site	Assembly site	Transmission
Betaentomopoxvirus	Lepidoptera insects; orthoptera insects	Hemocytes; fat bodies	Glycosaminoglycans	Lysis; budding; occlusion	Cytoplasm	Cytoplasm	Unknown
