= Chordopoxvirinae =

Virus classification
- (unranked): Virus
- Realm: Varidnaviria
- Kingdom: Bamfordvirae
- Phylum: Nucleocytoviricota
- Class: Pokkesviricetes
- Order: Chitovirales
- Family: Poxviridae
- Subfamily: Chordopoxvirinae

Genera
- See text

Subfamily of viruses

Chordopoxvirinae is a subfamily of viruses in the family Poxviridae. Only vertebrates are hosts of members of the Chordopoxvirinae (arthropods serve as natural hosts of the Entomopoxvirinae). The subfamily contains 18 genera. Diseases associated with this subfamily include smallpox.

Four genera in this subfamily contain species that infect humans: Molluscipoxvirus, Orthopoxvirus, Parapoxvirus, and Yatapoxvirus.

== Virology ==
The virions are generally enveloped though the intracellular mature virion form of the virus, which contains a different envelope and is also infectious. They vary in their shape depending upon the species but are generally shaped like a brick or as an oval form similar to a rounded brick because they are wrapped by the endoplasmic reticulum. The virion is exceptionally large, around 200 nm in diameter and 300 nm in length, and carries its genome in a single, double-stranded segment of DNA. Genomes are linear, around 130–375 kb in length.

Genus	Structure	Symmetry	Capsid	Genomic arrangement	Genomic segmentation
Yatapoxvirus	Brick-shaped		Enveloped	Linear	Monopartite
Cervidpoxvirus	Brick-shaped		Enveloped	Linear	Monopartite
Leporipoxvirus	Brick-shaped		Enveloped	Linear	Monopartite
Suipoxvirus	Brick-shaped		Enveloped	Linear	Monopartite
Molluscipoxvirus	Brick-shaped		Enveloped	Linear	Monopartite
Crocodylidpoxvirus	Ovoid		Enveloped	Linear	Monopartite
Capripoxvirus	Brick-shaped		Enveloped	Linear	Monopartite
Orthopoxvirus	Brick-shaped		Enveloped	Linear	Monopartite
Avipoxvirus	Brick-shaped		Enveloped	Linear	Monopartite
Parapoxvirus	Ovoid		Enveloped	Linear	Monopartite

== Lifecycle ==
Viral replication is cytoplasmic. Entry into the host cell is achieved by attachment of the viral proteins to host glycosaminoglycans (GAGs), which mediate endocytosis of the virus into the host cell. Fusion with the plasma membrane releases the core into the host cytoplasm. In the early phase, early genes are transcribed in the cytoplasm by viral RNA polymerase. Early expression begins at 30 minutes postinfection. The core is completely uncoated as early expression ends, the viral genome is then free in the cytoplasm. In the intermediate phase, intermediate genes are expressed, triggering genomic DNA replication about 100 minutes after infection. In the late phase, late genes are expressed from 140 min to 48 hours postinfection, producing all structural proteins. Assembly of progeny virions starts in cytoplasmic viral factories, producing a spherical, immature particle. This virus particle matures into brick-shaped intracellular mature virion, which can be released upon cell lysis, or can acquire a second double membrane from trans-Golgi and bud as external enveloped virion host receptors, which mediates endocytosis. Replication follows the DNA strand displacement model. DNA-templated transcription is the method of transcription. The virus exits the host cell by microtubular outwards viral transport, and exists in occlusion bodies after cell death and remains infectious until finding another host. Humans, vertebrates, and arthropods serve as the natural host. Transmission routes are fomite, contact, and airborne particles.

Genus	Host details	Tissue tropism	Entry details	Release details	Replication site	Assembly site	Transmission
Yatapoxvirus	Monkeys; baboons	None	Glycosaminoglycans	Lysis; budding	Cytoplasm	Cytoplasm	Contact; insects
Cervidpoxvirus	Deer	None	Glycosaminoglycans	Lysis; budding	Cytoplasm	Cytoplasm	Unknown
Leporipoxvirus	Lagomorph; squirrels	None	Glycosaminoglycans	Lysis; budding	Cytoplasm	Cytoplasm	Arthropods; contact
Suipoxvirus	Swine	None	Glycosaminoglycans	Lysis; budding	Cytoplasm	Cytoplasm	Unknown
Molluscipoxvirus	Humans	None	Glycosaminoglycans	Lysis; budding	Cytoplasm	Cytoplasm	Sex; contact
Crocodylidpoxvirus	Crocodiles	None	Glycosaminoglycans	Lysis; budding	Cytoplasm	Cytoplasm	Unknown
Capripoxvirus	Sheep; goat; cattle	None	Glycosaminoglycans	Lysis; budding	Cytoplasm	Cytoplasm	Arthropods; contact
Orthopoxvirus	Humans; mammals	None	Glycosaminoglycans	Lysis; budding	Cytoplasm	Cytoplasm	Variola virus; Respiratory; contact; zoonosis
Avipoxvirus	Birds	None	Glycosaminoglycans	Lysis; budding	Cytoplasm	Cytoplasm	Arthropods; aerosol
Parapoxvirus	Humans; mammals	None	Glycosaminoglycans	Lysis; budding	Cytoplasm	Cytoplasm	Zoonosis; contact

== Taxonomy ==
The classification in this subfamily is based on the morphology, nucleic acid type, mode of replication, host organisms, and type of disease caused.

Nine genera in this subfamily are recognized; also, a number of species have not yet been assigned to a genus.

The species in the genus Avipoxvirus infect birds; those in the genera Caiman poxvirus and Crocodylipoxvirus both infect crocodilians.

The other genera in this subfamily infect mammals.

The following genera are recognized:

- Avipoxvirus
- Capripoxvirus
- Centapoxvirus
- Cervidpoxvirus
- Crocodylidpoxvirus
- Leporipoxvirus
- Macropopoxvirus
- Molluscipoxvirus
- Mustelpoxvirus
- Orthopoxvirus
- Oryzopoxvirus
- Parapoxvirus
- Pteropopoxvirus
- Salmonpoxvirus
- Sciuripoxvirus
- Suipoxvirus
- Vespertilionpoxvirus
- Yatapoxvirus

== Evolution ==
The last common ancestor of the extant poxviruses that infect vertebrates existed 0.5 million years ago. The genus Avipoxvirus diverged from the ancestor 249 ± 69 thousand years ago. The ancestor of the genus Orthopoxvirus was next to diverge from the other clades at 0.3 million years ago. A second estimate of this divergence time places this event at 166 ± 43,000 years ago. The division of the Orthopox into the extant species occurred about 14,000 years ago. The genus Leporipoxvirus diverged around 137 ± 35,000 years ago. This was followed by the ancestor of the genus Yatapoxvirus. The last common ancestor of the Capripoxvirus and Suipoxvirus diverged 111 ± 29,000 years ago.

A Bayesian study of orthopox genomes suggests that the unclassified Yoka poxvirus diverged from the lineage that gave rise to the orthopoxviruses roughly 90,000 years ago. The orthopox viruses diverged from the other pox viruses about 10,000 years ago. Camelpox, taterapox, and variola viruses arose 3,500 years ago and horsepox virus 3,000 years ago. These viruses may have arisen in the Horn of Africa.

Another Bayesian study suggests that variola arose about 3500 years ago.
