= Quokkapox virus =

Virus classification
- (unranked): Virus
- Realm: Varidnaviria
- Kingdom: Bamfordvirae
- Phylum: Nucleocytoviricota
- Class: Pokkesviricetes
- Order: Chitovirales
- Family: Poxviridae
- Genus: unassigned
- Virus: Quokkapox virus

Virus that causes pox lesions in quokka

Quokkapox virus (QPV), also known as quokka poxvirus, marsupial papillomavirus, or marsupialpox virus, is a dsDNA virus that causes quokkapox. It is unclear whether this virus is its own species or a member of another species. It primarily infects the quokka, which is one of only four macropodid marsupials that contract pox lesions. The lesions appear mainly on the tail and may be as wide as 5 centimetres (2.0 in) in diameter. The biological behavior of the virus has yet to be identified, and the lesions appear to be specific to the species. The papilloma-like lesion in humans showcases many differences from the marsupial papillomata.

Because the quokka lives primarily on isolated islands in Western Australia, the range of the virus is limited as well. It was first described in 1972 from samples taken on Rottnest Island.
