= Tanapox =

- Specialty: Infectious disease
- Causes: Tanapox virus

Tanapox (a virus from the genus Yatapoxvirus) was first seen among individuals in the flood plain of the Tana River in Kenya during two epidemics (1957 and 1962) of acute febrile illness accompanied by localized skin lesions.

== Signs and symptoms ==
The incubation period in human cases remains unknown, but in a person who underwent voluntary inoculation, erythema and central thickening appear by the fourth day. Most patients present a mild pre-eruptive fever that lasts 3–4 days, severe headaches and backaches, and often itching at the site where the skin lesion develops.

There is initially a small nodule, without any central abrasion. This small nodule soon becomes papular and gradually enlarges to reach a maximum diameter of about 15 mm by the end of the second week of infection. The draining lymph nodes are also enlarged and tender from about the fifth day following the appearance of the skin lesion. The lesion remains mostly nodular but, ulcerates during the third week and then gradually heals within five to six weeks, leaving a scar.

In Kenya, the lesions were almost always solitary and were found on the upper arm, face, neck, and truck. Conversely, in Zaire, 22% of patients had multiple lesions, usually two or three. The maximum number of lesions seen in one patient was ten. In the case of Zairian patients, the lesions were mostly found on the lower limbs, with a couple of patients reporting lesions on the upper limbs, trunk, and head.

== Histopathology ==
Tanapox virus in humans produces increased thickening of the epidermis with extensive degeneration of the prickle cell layer. The cytoplasm of the swollen epidermal cells is filled with large, eosinophilic, pleomorphic, B-type inclusion bodies. Nuclei of infected cells are also swollen, with chromatin being concentrated at the nuclear periphery.

== Epidemiology ==
Human tanapox has been mostly documented in Kenya and Zaire, but it is believed to occur much more widely throughout tropical Africa. All age groups and both sexes appear to be affected by this virus. During the Kenyan epidemics of 1957 and 1962, cases of tanapox were reported more frequently among persons who worked or played close to the river. As a result of this, researchers concluded that tanapox is most likely a zoonosis. However, neither the reservoir host nor the mode of transmission from wild animal to human is known. It is hypothesized that tanapox virus may be transferred from monkeys or another reservoir host to humans by infected arthropods that act as mechanical vectors. Only one case of human to human transmission has been reported.
