= B13R (virus protein) =

Identifiers
- Organism: Vaccinia virus (strain Western Reserve)
- Symbol: ?
- Orthologs: OMA: entry
- UniProt: P15059
Search for
- Structures: Swiss-model
- Domains: InterPro

B13R (sometimes called SPI-2) is a protein expressed by vaccinia virus.

Vaccinia virus is member of Orthopoxvirus family. These viruses contain approximately 200 genes in their genome. About one third of the genome is not necessary for the viral replication itself. These viral products interfere with the host immune response. SPI-2 is one of these immunomodulatory factors.

SPI-2 is a nonglycosylated peptide with size of 38,5 kDa. It is expressed in an early phase of infection. The initiation site for transcription was identified about 72 nucleotides upstream from the open reading frame. The translated protein stays in the cytoplasm of the host cell. SPI-2 shares 92% of its amino acid sequence with the cowpox virus modifier of the cytokine response – known as crmA.

SPI-2 belongs in superfamily of the inhibitors of serine proteases (serpins). Serpins are the most broadly distributed family of inhibitors of proteases. They were identified in all multicellular eukaryotic organisms. In mammals serpins are secreted in plasma where they serve as inhibitors of proteases involved in blood coagulation, inflammation and complement activation.

SPI-2 inhibits processing of an inactive precursor of interleukin-1β (pro-IL-1β) to active form of this cytokine. It does so by binding to caspase 1 (or ICE – interleukin-1 converting enzyme) which is under normal circumstances activated by the formation of inflammasome. SPI-2 expression also inhibits the apoptotic pathway activated by Fas-ligand and TNFα.

Deletion of SPI-2 leads to virus attenuation in vivo (observed in mice model after intranasal infection) but without any remarkable influence on the host immune response. That was one of the reasons this gene was targeted during search for more safe and efficient vaccine against smallpox. It was shown that immunization with vaccinia virus with deleted SPI-2 and 1 and coexpressing IFNγ leads to strong attenuation but without decreasing host immune response. Host reaction was comparable to that on MVA virus (modified virus Ankara) which serves as a smallpox vaccine nowadays. The Copenhagen strain of vaccinia virus only has a truncated version of this protein.

Vaccinia virus encodes two more serpin - SPI-1 and SPI-3. SPI-1 influences the host range and SPI-3 stops infected cells from fusing together.
