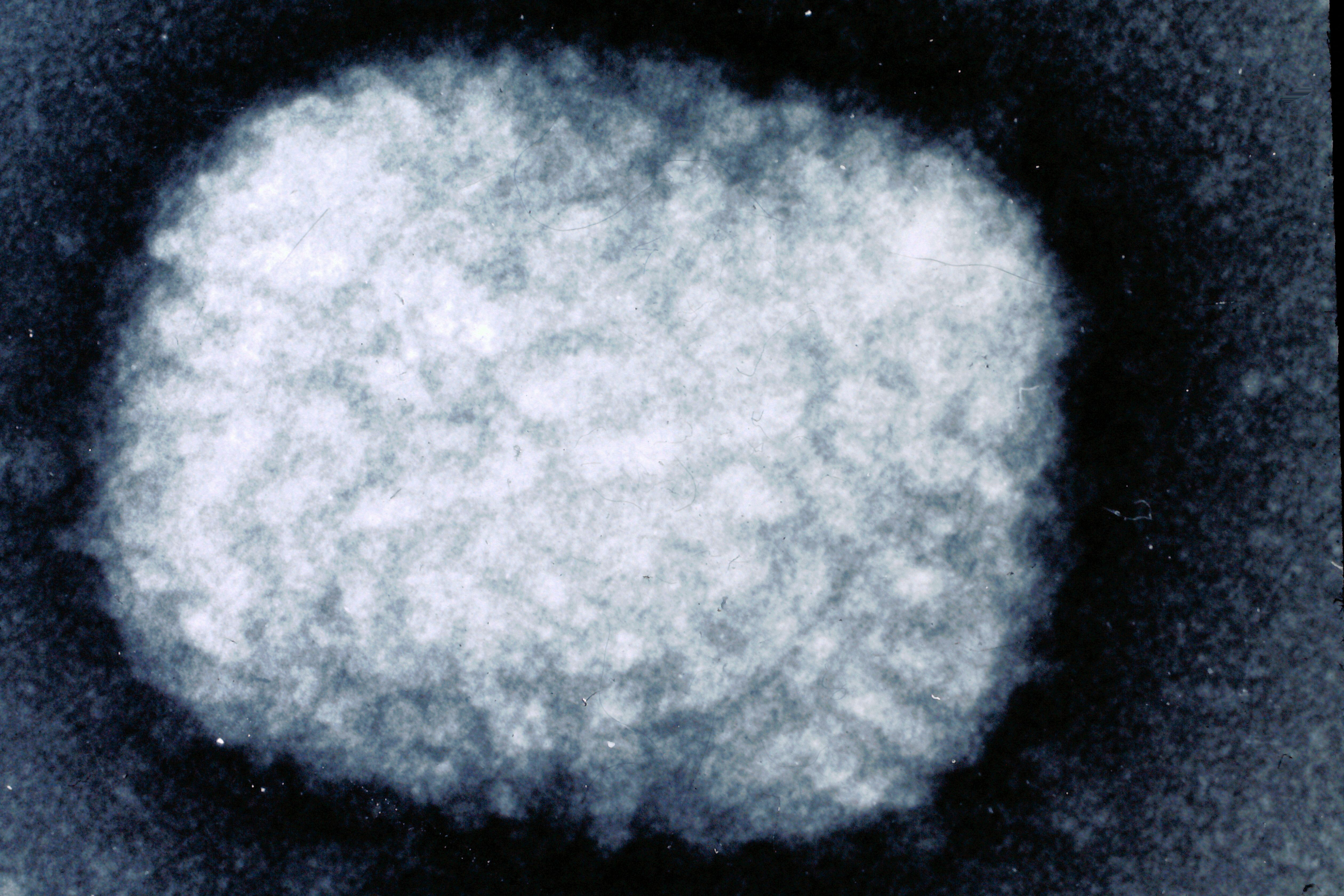

Virus classification
- (unranked): Virus
- Realm: Varidnaviria
- Kingdom: Bamfordvirae
- Phylum: Nucleocytoviricota
- Class: Pokkesviricetes
- Order: Chitovirales
- Family: Poxviridae

Subfamilies
- See text

= Poxviridae =

Family of viruses

Poxviridae is a family of double-stranded DNA viruses. Vertebrates and arthropods serve as natural hosts. The family contains 28 genera that are assigned to two subfamilies: Chordopoxvirinae and Entomopoxvirinae. Entomopoxvirinae infect insects and Chordopoxvirinae infect vertebrates. Diseases associated with this family include smallpox.

Four genera of poxviruses can infect humans: Orthopoxvirus, Parapoxvirus, Yatapoxvirus, Molluscipoxvirus. Only 2 are species-specific to humans: variola virus (VARV), and Molluscum contagiosum (MCV). The most common are the vaccinia virus (seen on the Indian subcontinent) and molluscum contagiosum virus, but Mpox infections are rising (seen in the West, and central African rainforest countries).

The similarly named disease chickenpox is not caused by a poxvirus, but by varicella zoster, a herpesvirus. Parapoxvirus and Orthopoxvirus genera are zoonotic.

== Etymology ==
The name of the family, Poxviridae, is a legacy of the original grouping of viruses associated with diseases that produced poxes on the skin. Modern viral classification is based on phenotypic characteristics; morphology, nucleic acid type, mode of replication, host organisms, and the type of disease they cause. The smallpox virus remains the most notable member of the family.

== History ==
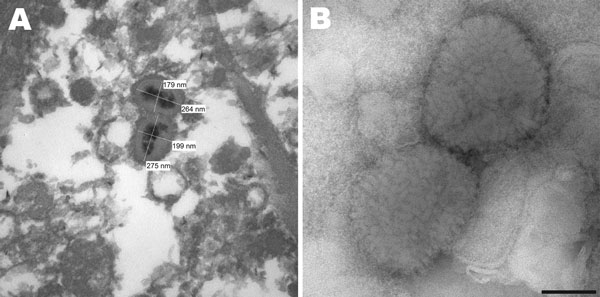
A) Electron micrograph of poxvirus particles in synovium of a big brown bat, northwestern United States. B) Negative staining of poxvirus particles in cell culture supernatant. Scale bar = 100 nm.

Diseases caused by poxviruses, especially smallpox, have been known about for centuries. One of the earliest suspected cases is that of Egyptian Pharaoh, Ramses V, who is thought to have died from smallpox circa 1150 years BCE. Smallpox was thought to have been transferred to Europe around the early 8th century and then to the Americas in the early 16th century, resulting in the deaths of 3.2 million Aztecs within two years of introduction. This death toll can be attributed to the indigenous population's complete lack of exposure to the virus over millennia.

A century after Edward Jenner (1798) showed that the less potent cowpox, could be used to effectively vaccinate against the more deadly smallpox, a worldwide effort to vaccinate everyone against smallpox began with the ultimate goal to rid the world of the plague-like epidemic. The last case of endemic smallpox occurred in Somalia in 1977. Extensive searches over two years detected no further cases, and in 1979 the World Health Organization (WHO) declared the disease officially eradicated.

In 1986, all virus samples were destroyed or transferred to two approved WHO reference labs: at the headquarters of the federal Centers for Disease Control and Prevention (the C.D.C.) in Atlanta, Georgia (the United States) and at the Institute of Virus Preparations in Moscow. After the September 11 attacks in 2001, the American and UK governments have had increased concern over the use of smallpox, or a smallpox-like disease, in bioterrorism. However, several poxviruses including vaccinia virus, myxoma virus, tanapox virus and raccoon pox virus are currently being investigated for their therapeutic potential in various human cancers in preclinical and clinical studies.

The study of poxviruses within cell cultures, allowed for the discovery of Guanosine-5'-triphosphate 5'-methyl-(GTP) capping, 2'-O-methylation, and 3' polyadenylation; vital molecules in the stability and effective translation of mRNA into proteins.

== Microbiology ==
=== Structure ===
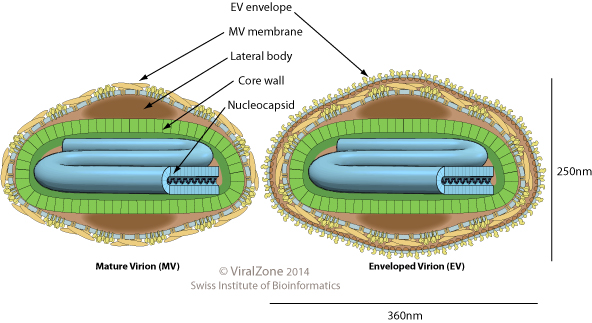
Poxviridae virion

Poxviridae viral particles (virions) are generally enveloped (external enveloped virion), although the intracellular mature virion form of the virus, which contains different envelope, is also infectious. They vary in their shape depending upon the species, but are generally brick- or oval-shaped. The virion is exceptionally large, its size ranges from 220-450nm long, 140-260nm wide, and 140-260nm thick, this is likely due to poxviruses encoding all of the vitally needed proteins for their self-sufficient DNA replication and transcription. By comparison, rhinoviruses are 1/10 as large as a typical Poxviridae virion. The genome is a single, linear, double-stranded segment of DNA. On the outer surface membrane it has randomly arranged tubules.

=== Genome ===
Phylogenetic analysis of 26 different Chordopoxvirinae genomes has shown that the central region of the genome is conserved, and contains ~90 genes. The termini in contrast are not conserved between species. Of this group Avipoxvirus is the most divergent. The next most divergent is Molluscipoxvirus. Capripoxvirus, Leporipoxvirus, Suipoxvirus and Yatapoxvirus genera cluster together: Capripoxvirus and Suipoxvirus share a common ancestor and are distinct from the genus Orthopoxvirus. Within the Othopoxvirus genus, Cowpox virus strain Brighton Red, Ectromelia virus and Mpox virus do not group closely with any other member. Variola virus and Camelpox virus form a subgroup. Vaccinia virus is most closely related to CPV-GRI-90.

The GC-content of family member genomes differ considerably. Avipoxvirus, capripoxvirus, cervidpoxvirus, orthopoxvirus, suipoxvirus, yatapoxvirus and one Entomopox genus (Betaentomopoxvirus) along with several other unclassified Entomopoxviruses have a low G+C content while others - Molluscipoxvirus, Orthopoxvirus, Parapoxvirus and some unclassified Chordopoxvirus - have a relatively high G+C content. The reasons for these differences are not known.

The ends of their double-stranded DNA (dsDNA) genomes are closed with a hairpin-like structure which is AT-rich, and incompletely base-paired. This structure can exist in two forms: inverted, and complementary. The DNA genome varies from 130-230 kbp.

The genome encodes for many important proteins for viral replication. For vaccinia these are: a helicase-primase (viral gene, D5), single-stranded DNA-binding protein (viral gene, I3), protein kinase (viral gene, B1), 117-kDa DNA polymerase (viral gene, E9), a processivity factor (viral gene, A20) and an uracil DNA glycosylase (viral gene, E4). The 117-kDa DNA polymerase is found within all of the currently sequenced Poxviruses (~30 strains).

=== Replication ===
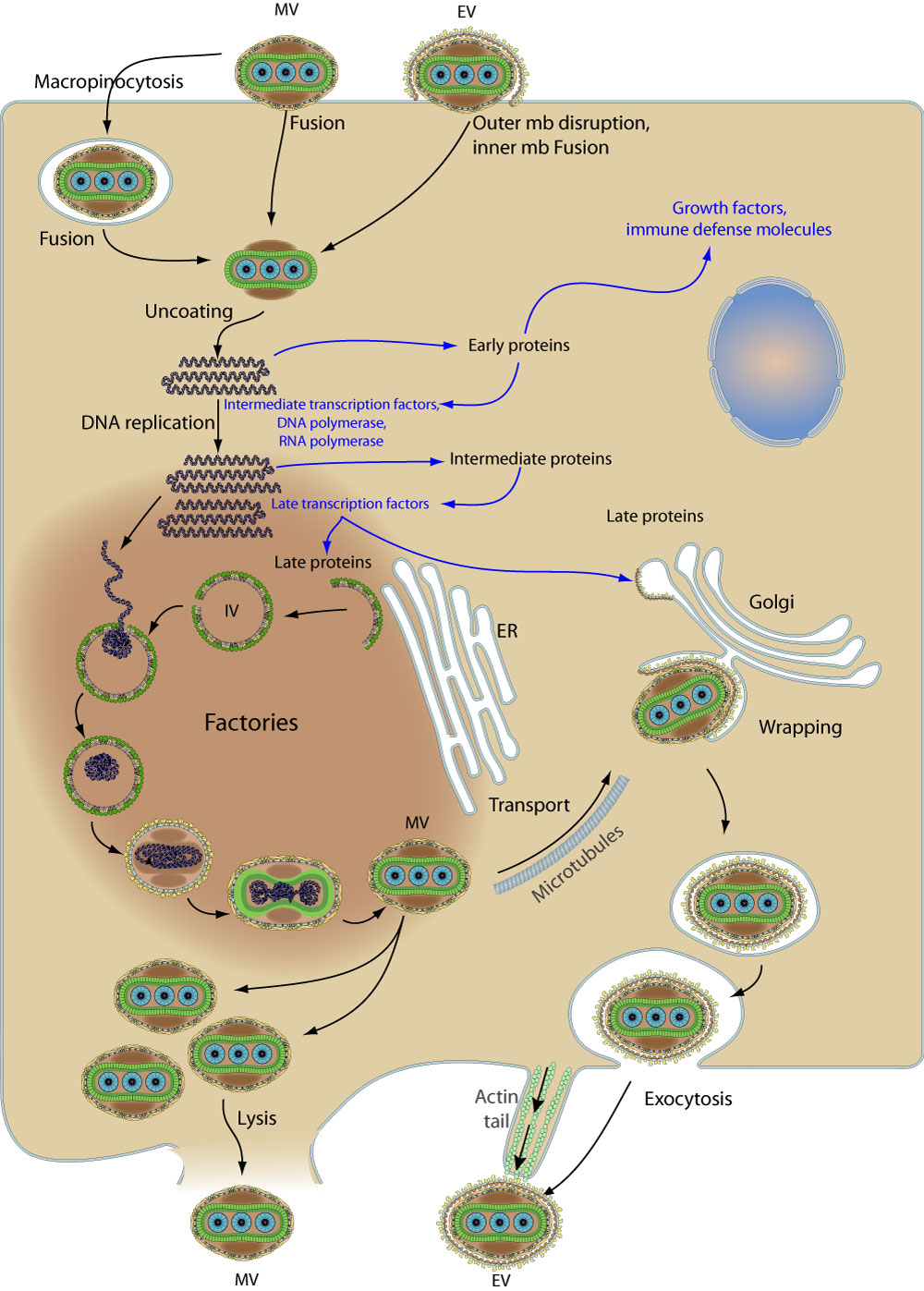
Poxviridae replication cycle

The replication of poxviruses is unique, as most DNA viruses enter the nucleus of host cells to begin viral replication, whereas Poxviruses complete their full replication cycle within the host cells cytoplasm.

Replication of the poxvirus involves several stages. The replication can be divided into early, intermediate and late phase. Firstly, the virus binds to glycosaminoglycan receptors on the host cells surface, and undergoes membrane fusion.

The early genes encode the non-structural proteins, including proteins necessary for replication of the viral genome, and constitute nearly half of the viral genome. These genes are translated by host cell machinery. Poxviruses also synthesise DNA replication, and nucleotide metabolism enzymes, in the early phase of viral replication. These earlier genes are similar to the host cells mRNAs, with Poxviruses also synthesising their own 5'-methyl-GTP cap (which is required for host cell mRNA translation into proteins), and 3'-polyA-tail. The 5'-methyl cap is recognised by eurkaryotic initiation factor (eIF4F), and results in the recruitment of the ribosome small subunit complex.

In the intermediate phase, the DNA is thought to be synthesised in a 'Rolling circle mechanism', where essentially, it can generate multiple copies of the DNA genome in one continuous replication sequence. Poxviruses form virus 'factories', which are surrounded by the host cells endoplasmic reticulum, to protect it from being detected by the host cells antiviral sensors. These virus factories are involved in the production of intermediate and late genes involved in DNA replication and transcription (also known as postreplicative genes).

The intermediate and late stages are characterised by the shutting off of host translation, whilst host ribosomes are targeted more significantly. One viral protein known as 169 causes the accumulation of host ribosomes, and blocks initiation of translation of a broad range of mRNAs, including the inhibition of its own early viral mRNAs (supported by its decapping proteins, D9 and D10), which forces the production of late stage genes. Intriguingly, D9 and D10 decapping proteins have also been shown to stimulate translation. By removing 5'cap from the mRNA, the virus reduces the accumulation of viral dsRNA, and inhibits immune response.

As the viral particles are assembled, they are enveloped by the intracellular membrane and released. There are two distinct infectious viral particles formed during viral assembly: intracellular mature virions (IMVs) and extracellular enveloped virions (EEVs). IMVs are antigenically distinct from EEVs, have only a singular membrane, are more abundant, and released from cells upon cell lysis. EEVs have a double membrane, are released from host cells via membrane fusion, and vary in membrane composition, and cell surface glycoproteins.

The replication of Poxvirus is unusual for a virus with a double-stranded DNA genome, because it occurs in the cytoplasm, although this is typical of other large DNA viruses. Poxvirus encodes its own machinery for genome transcription, a DNA-dependent RNA polymerase, which makes replication in the cytoplasm possible. Most double-stranded DNA viruses require the host cell's DNA-dependent RNA polymerase to perform transcription. These host polymerases are found in the nucleus, and therefore most double-stranded DNA viruses carry out a part of their infection cycle within the host cell's nucleus.

The intermediate phase of replication involves a critical alteration of the host cell’s normal function, with the virus modifying it to better suit its replication. For example, the virus can inhibit host apoptosis and block the antiviral state. One early viral protein, B1 kinase, has also been shown to stimulate translation of postreplicative viral mRNAs, through specific phosphorylation of ribosomal subunits.

== Evolution ==
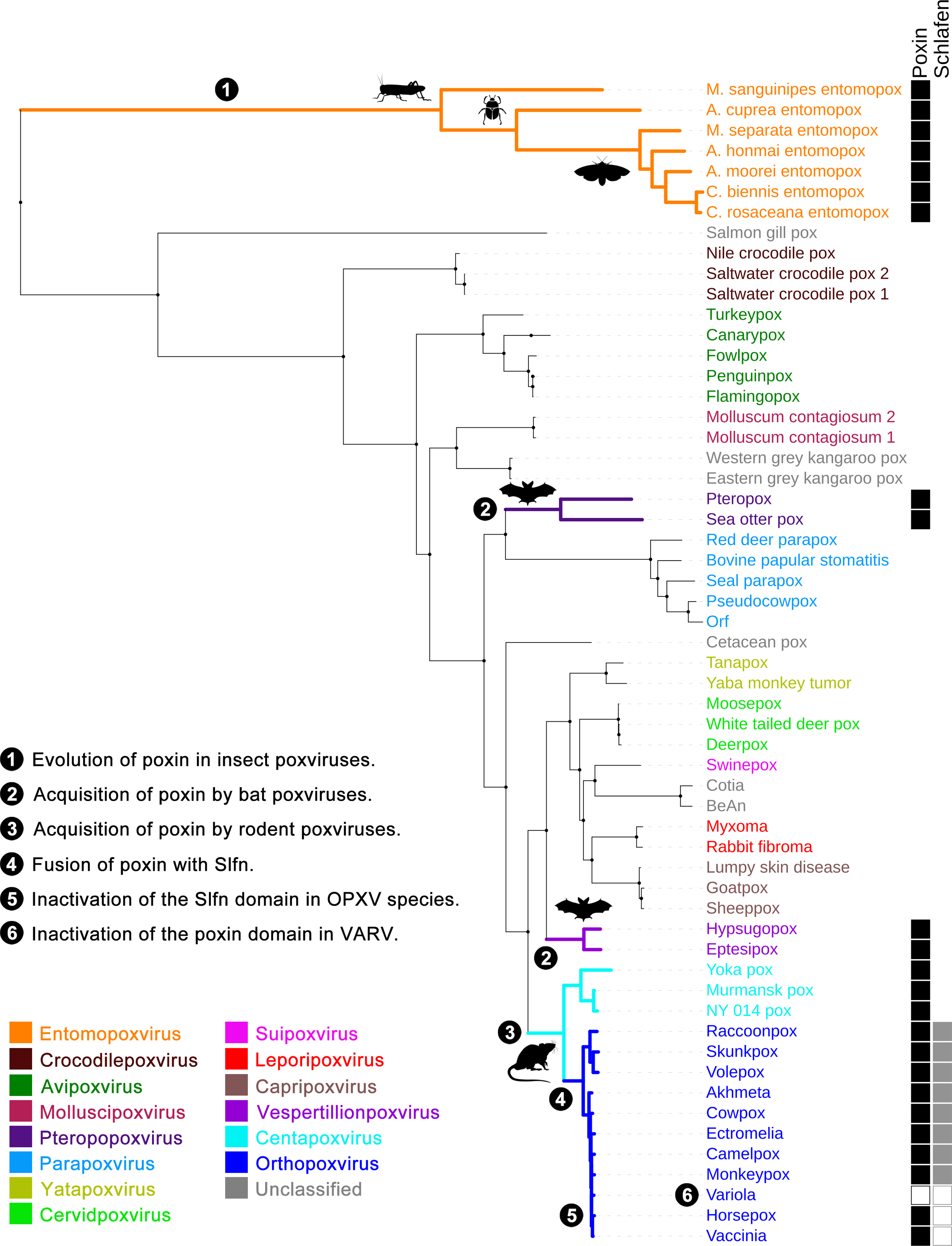
Phylogenetic tree of Poxviridae (whole genome) and distribution of cGAMP nucleases across member species and genera

The ancestor of the poxviruses is not known but structural studies suggest it may have been an adenovirus or a species related to both the poxviruses and the adenoviruses.

Based on the genome organisation and DNA replication mechanism a phylogenetic relationships may exist between the rudiviruses (Rudiviridae) and the large eukaryal DNA viruses: the African swine fever virus (Asfarviridae), Chlorella viruses (Phycodnaviridae) and poxviruses (Poxviridae).

The mutation rate in poxvirus genomes has been estimated to be 0.9–1.2 × 10^{−6} substitutions per site per year. A second estimate puts this rate at 0.5–7 × 10^{−6} nucleotide substitutions per site per year. A third estimate places the rate at 4–6 × 10^{−6}.

The last common ancestor of the extant poxviruses that infect vertebrates existed 0.5 million years ago. The genus Avipoxvirus diverged from the ancestor 249 ± 69 thousand years ago. The ancestor of the genus Orthopoxvirus was next to diverge from the other clades at 0.3 million years ago. A second estimate of this divergence time places this event at 166,000 ± 43,000 years ago. The division of the Orthopoxvirus into the extant genera occurred ~14,000 years ago. The genus Leporipoxvirus diverged ~137,000 ± 35,000 years ago. This was followed by the ancestor of the genus Yatapoxvirus. The last common ancestor of the Capripoxvirus and Suipoxvirus diverged 111,000 ± 29,000 years ago.

An isolate from a fish – salmon gill poxvirus – appears to be the earliest branch in the Chordopoxvirinae. A new systematic has been proposed recently after findings of a new squirrel poxvirus in Berlin, Germany.

=== Smallpox ===
The date of the appearance of smallpox is not settled. It most likely evolved from a rodent virus between 68,000 and 16,000 years ago. The wide range of dates is due to the different records used to calibrate the molecular clock. One clade was the variola major strains (the more clinically severe form of smallpox), which spread from Asia between 400 and 1,600 years ago. A second clade included both alastrim minor (a phenotypically mild smallpox), described from the American continents and isolates from West Africa, which diverged from an ancestral strain between 1,400, and 6,300 years, before present. This clade further diverged into two subclades, at least 800 years ago.

A second estimate has placed the separation of variola from Taterapox at 3000–4000 years ago. This is consistent with archaeological and historical evidence regarding the appearance of smallpox as a human disease which suggests a relatively recent origin. However, if the mutation rate is assumed to be similar to that of the herpesviruses the divergence date between variola from Taterapox has been estimated to be 50,000 years ago. While this is consistent with the other published estimates it suggests that the archaeological and historical evidence is very incomplete. Better estimates of mutation rates in these viruses are needed.

== Taxonomy ==
The species in the subfamily Chordopoxvirinae infect vertebrates and those in the subfamily Entomopoxvirinae infect insects.

The following subfamilies and genera are recognized (-virinae denotes subfamily and -virus denotes genus):

Subfamily: Chordopoxvirinae

- Avipoxvirus
- Capripoxvirus
- Centapoxvirus
- Cervidpoxvirus
- Crocodylidpoxvirus
- Leporipoxvirus
- Macropopoxvirus
- Molluscipoxvirus
- Mustelpoxvirus
- Orthopoxvirus
- Oryzopoxvirus
- Parapoxvirus
- Pteropopoxvirus
- Salmonpoxvirus
- Sciuripoxvirus
- Suipoxvirus
- Vespertilionpoxvirus
- Yatapoxvirus

Subfamily: Entomopoxvirinae

- Alphaentomopoxvirus
- Betaentomopoxvirus
- Deltaentomopoxvirus
- Epsilonentomopoxvirus

Variola (smallpox) and molluscum contagiosum are two viruses who have humans as their sole host. The four genera that infect humans and the species, can be seen in the table below:

Viruses causing disease within humans
Genera	Species
Orthopoxvirus	Variola (smallpox); Vaccinia virus; Cowpox virus; Mpox virus
Parapoxvirus	Orf virus; Paravaccinia virus (pseudocowpox); Bovine papular stomatitis virus
Molluscipoxvirus	Molluscum contagiosum virus (MCV)

== Vaccinia virus ==
The prototypical poxvirus is vaccinia virus, known for its role in the eradication of smallpox. The vaccinia virus is an effective tool for foreign protein expression, as it elicits a strong host immune-response. The vaccinia virus enters cells primarily by cell fusion, although currently the receptor responsible is unknown.

Vaccinia contains three classes of genes: early, intermediate and late. These genes are transcribed by viral RNA polymerase and associated transcription factors. Vaccinia replicates its genome in the cytoplasm of infected cells, and after late-stage gene expression undergoes virion morphogenesis, which produces intracellular mature virions contained within an envelope membrane. The origin of the envelope membrane is still unknown. The intracellular mature virions are then transported to the Golgi apparatus where it is wrapped with an additional two membranes, becoming the intracellular enveloped virus. This is transported along cytoskeletal microtubules to reach the cell periphery, where it fuses with the plasma membrane to become the cell-associated enveloped virus. This triggers actin tails on cell surfaces or is released as external enveloped virion.

== See also ==
- Quokkapox virus
- Water warts
