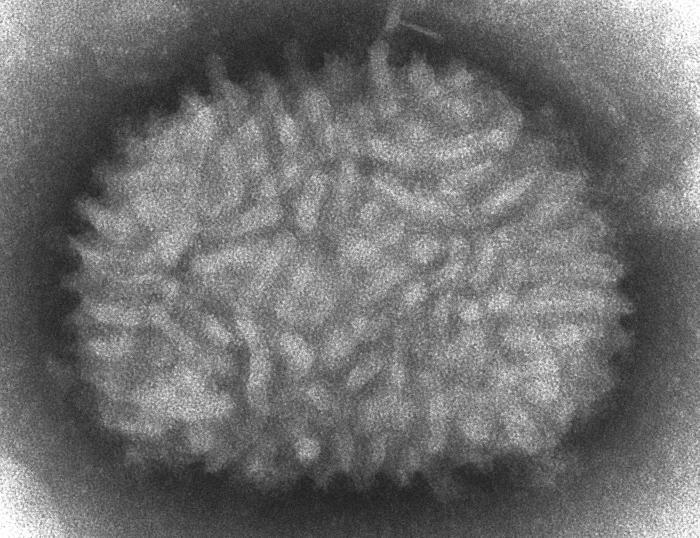
- A TEM micrograph of Vaccinia virus virions

Virus classification
- (unranked): Virus
- Realm: Varidnaviria
- Kingdom: Bamfordvirae
- Phylum: Nucleocytoviricota
- Class: Pokkesviricetes
- Order: Chitovirales
- Family: Poxviridae
- Genus: Orthopoxvirus
- Species: Orthopoxvirus vaccinia

Member viruses
- Buffalopox virus; Cantagalo virus; Rabbitpox virus Utrecht; Vaccinia virus Ankara; Vaccinia virus Copenhagen; Vaccinia virus WR

= Vaccinia =

Orthopoxvirus vaccinia

Species of poxvirus

Vaccinia
- Specialty: Virology
- Types: Progressive vaccinia

The vaccinia virus (VACV or VV) (Note: Taxonomical species names were updated by the International Committee on Taxonomy of Viruses in June 2024, with Vaccinia virus being renamed Orthopoxvirus vaccinia.) is a large, complex, enveloped virus belonging to the poxvirus family. It has a linear, double-stranded DNA genome approximately 190 kbp in length, which encodes approximately 250 genes. The dimensions of the virion are roughly 360 × 270 × 250 nm, with a mass of approximately 5–10 fg. The vaccinia virus is the source of the modern smallpox vaccine, which the World Health Organization (WHO) used to eradicate smallpox in a global vaccination campaign in 1958–1977. Although smallpox no longer exists in the wild, vaccinia virus is still studied widely by scientists as a tool for gene therapy and genetic engineering.

Smallpox had been an endemic human disease that had a 30% fatality rate. In 1796, the British doctor Edward Jenner proved that an infection with the relatively mild cowpox virus would also confer immunity to the deadly smallpox. Jenner referred to cowpox as variolae vaccinae (smallpox of the cow). However, the origins of the smallpox vaccine became murky over time, especially after Louis Pasteur developed laboratory techniques for creating vaccines in the 19th century. Allan Watt Downie demonstrated in 1939 that the modern smallpox vaccine was serologically distinct from cowpox, and vaccinia was subsequently recognized as a separate viral species. Whole-genome sequencing has revealed that vaccinia is most closely related to horsepox, and the cowpox strains found in Great Britain are the least closely related to vaccinia.

== Classification of vaccinia infections ==
In addition to the morbidity of uncomplicated primary vaccination, transfer of infection to other sites by scratching, and post-vaccinial encephalitis, other complications of vaccinia infections may be divided into the following types:

- Generalized vaccinia
- Eczema vaccinatum
- Progressive vaccinia (vaccinia gangrenosum, vaccinia necrosum)
- Roseola vaccinia

== Virology ==
Poxviruses are unique among DNA viruses because they replicate only in the cytoplasm of the host cell, outside of the nucleus. Therefore, the large genome is required for encoding various enzymes and proteins involved in viral DNA replication and gene transcription. During its replication cycle, VV produces four infectious forms which differ in their outer membranes: intracellular mature virion (IMV), the intracellular enveloped virion (IEV), the cell-associated enveloped virion (CEV) and the extracellular enveloped virion (EEV). Although the issue remains contentious, the prevailing view is that the IMV consists of a single lipoprotein membrane, while the CEV and EEV are both surrounded by two membrane layers and the IEV has three envelopes. The IMV is the most abundant infectious form and is thought to be responsible for spread between hosts. On the other hand, the CEV is believed to play a role in cell-to-cell spread and the EEV is thought to be important for long range dissemination within the host organism.

== Multiplicity reactivation ==
Vaccinia virus is able to undergo multiplicity reactivation (MR). MR is the process by which two, or more, virus genomes containing otherwise lethal damage interact within an infected cell to form a viable virus genome. Abel found that vaccinia viruses exposed to doses of UV light sufficient to prevent progeny formation when single virus particles infected host chick embryo cells, could still produce viable progeny viruses when host cells were infected by two or more of these inactivated viruses; that is, MR could occur. Kim and Sharp demonstrated MR of vaccinia virus after treatment with UV-light, nitrogen mustard, and X-rays or gamma rays. Michod et al. reviewed numerous examples of MR in different viruses, and suggested that MR is a common form of sexual interaction in viruses that provides the advantage of recombinational repair of genome damages.

== Host resistance ==
Vaccinia contains within its genome genes for several proteins that give the virus resistance to interferons:

- K3L (P18378) is a protein with homology to the protein eukaryotic initiation factor 2 (eIF-2alpha). K3L protein inhibits the action of PKR, an activator of interferons.
- E3L (P21605) is another protein encoded by Vaccinia. E3L also inhibits PKR activation, and is also able to bind to double stranded RNA.
- B18R (P21076) directly binds to type I interferon to abolish its function; in other words it works as a decoy receptor. It is used in bioengineering, for cells with added nucleic acid might otherwise enter an antiviral state that reduces protein output. It is also used in a Moderna paper to enhance the chance of converting a cell into a induced pluripotent stem cell (iPSC) using mRNA.

== Treatments ==
Dissemination of vaccinia infection is rare due widespread immunization. Immunocompromised patients may be at risk of developing severe infection. The only current FDA-approved treatment is serotherapy (intravenous infusion of vaccinia immunoglobulin).

== Use as a vaccine ==
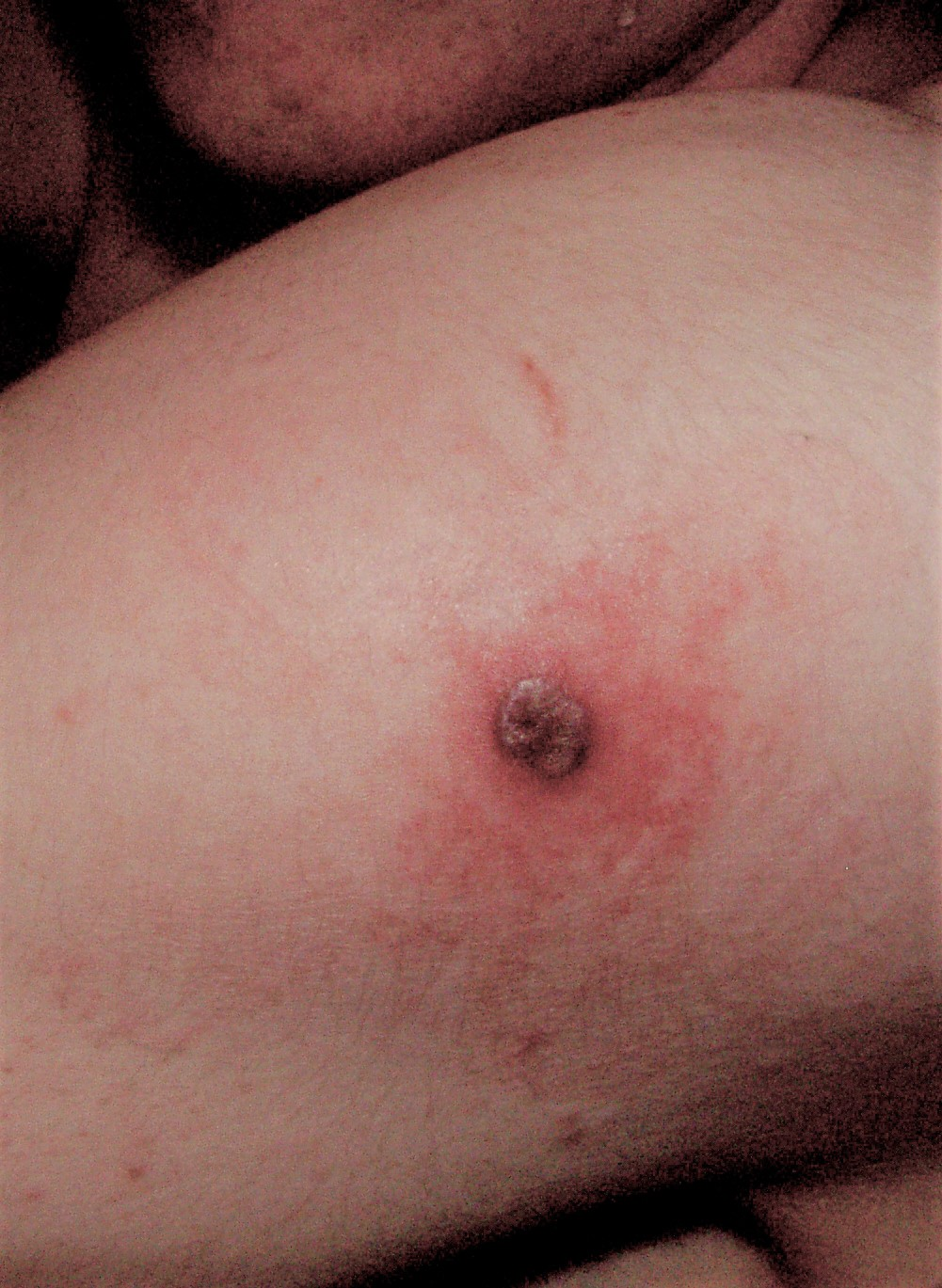
Site of a vaccinia injection, several days later

Vaccinia virus infection is typically very mild and often does not cause symptoms in healthy individuals, although it may cause rash and fever. Immune responses generated from a vaccinia virus infection protects the person against a lethal smallpox infection. For this reason, vaccinia virus was, and still is, being used as a live-virus vaccine against smallpox, and more recently against mpox. Unlike vaccines that use weakened forms of the virus being vaccinated against, the vaccinia virus vaccine cannot cause a smallpox infection because it does not contain the smallpox virus. However, certain complications and/or vaccine adverse effects occasionally arise. The chance of this happening is significantly increased in people who are immunocompromised. Approximately 1 to 2 people out of every 1 million people vaccinated could die as a result of life-threatening reactions to the vaccination. The rate of myopericarditis with ACAM2000 is 5.7 per 1,000 of primary vaccinees.

On September 1, 2007, the U.S. Food and Drug Administration (FDA) licensed a new vaccine ACAM2000 against smallpox which can be produced quickly upon need. Manufactured by Sanofi Pasteur, the U.S. Centers for Disease Control and Prevention stockpiled 192.5 million doses of the new vaccine (see list of common strains below).

A smallpox vaccine, Imvanex, which is based on the Modified vaccinia Ankara strain, was approved by the European Medicines Agency (EMA) in 2013. This strain has been used in vaccines during the 2022 monkeypox outbreak.

Vaccinia is also used in recombinant vaccines, as a vector for expression of foreign genes within a host, in order to generate an immune response. Other poxviruses are also used as live recombinant vaccines.

== History ==
The original vaccine for smallpox, and the origin of the idea of vaccination, was cowpox, described by Edward Jenner in 1798. The Latin term used for cowpox was Variolae vaccinae, Jenner's own translation of "smallpox of the cow". That term lent its name to the whole idea of vaccination. When it was realized that the virus used in smallpox vaccination was not, or was no longer, the same as cowpox virus, the name 'vaccinia' was used for the virus in smallpox vaccine. (See OED.) Vaccine potency and efficacy prior to the invention of refrigerated methods of transportation was unreliable. The vaccine would be rendered impotent by heat and sunlight, and the method of drying samples on quills and shipping them to countries in need often resulted in an inactive vaccine. Another method employed was the "arm to arm" method. This involved vaccinating an individual then transferring it to another as soon as the infectious pustule forms, then to another, etc. This method was used as a form of living transportation of the vaccine, and usually employed orphans as carriers. However, this method was problematic due to the possibility of spreading other blood diseases, such as hepatitis and syphilis, as was the case in 1861, when 41 Italian children contracted syphilis after being vaccinated by the "arm to arm" method. Henry Austin Martin introduced a method for vaccine production from calves.

In 1913, E. Steinhardt, C. Israeli, and R. A. Lambert grew vaccinia virus in fragments of pig corneal tissue culture.

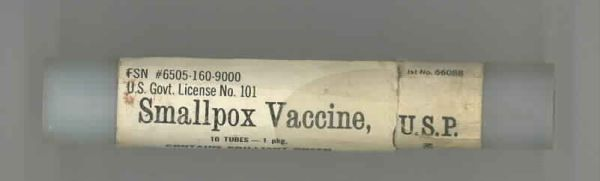
1950s US smallpox vaccine, produced by the National Drug Company in Philadelphia from vaccinia

A paper published in 1915 by Fredrick W. Twort, a student of Willian Bulloch, is considered to be the beginning of modern phage research. He was attempting to grow vaccinia virus on agar media in the absence of living cells when he noted that many colonies of contaminating micrococci grew up and appeared mucoid, watery or glassy, and this transformation could be induced in other colonies by inoculation of the fresh colony with material from the watery colony. Using a microscope, he observed that bacteria had degenerated into small granules that stained red with Giemsa stain. He concluded that "...it [the agent of transformation] might almost be considered as an acute infectious disease of micrococci."

In 1939 Allan Watt Downie showed that the smallpox vaccines being used in the 20th century and cowpox virus were not the same, but were immunologically related.

=== 2000–present ===
In March 2007, a 2-year-old Indiana boy and his mother contracted a life-threatening vaccinia infection from the boy's father. The boy developed the telltale rash over 80 percent of his body after coming into close contact with his father, who was vaccinated for smallpox before being deployed overseas by the United States Army. The United States military resumed smallpox vaccinations in 2002. The child acquired the infection due to eczema, which is a known risk factor for vaccinia infection. The boy was treated with intravenous immunoglobulin, cidofovir, and Tecovirimat (ST-246), a (then) experimental drug developed by SIGA Technologies. On April 19, 2007, he was sent home with no after effects except for possible scarring of the skin.

In 2010, the Centers for Disease Control and Prevention (CDC) reported that a woman in Washington had contracted vaccinia virus infection after digital vaginal contact with her boyfriend, a military member who had recently been vaccinated for smallpox. The woman had a history of childhood eczema, but she had not been symptomatic as an adult. The CDC indicated that it was aware of four similar cases in the preceding 12 months of vaccinia infection after sexual contact with a recent military vaccinee. Further cases—also in patients with a history of eczema—occurred in 2012.

== Origin ==
Vaccinia virus is closely related to the virus that causes cowpox; historically, the two were often considered to be one and the same. The precise origin of vaccinia virus is unknown due to the lack of record-keeping, as the virus was repeatedly cultivated and passaged in research laboratories for many decades. The most common notion is that vaccinia virus, cowpox virus, and variola virus (the causative agent of smallpox) were all derived from a common ancestral virus. There is also speculation that vaccinia virus was originally isolated from horses due to similarity to horsepox.

Horsepox is extinct in the wild, and the only known sample was collected in 1976. Because the sample was collected at the end of the smallpox eradication campaign, scientists considered the possibility that horsepox is a strain of vaccinia that had escaped into the wild. However, as more smallpox vaccines were sequenced, older vaccines were found to be more similar to horsepox than modern vaccinia strains. A smallpox vaccine manufactured by Mulford in 1902 is 99.7% similar to horsepox, closer than any previously known strain of vaccinia. Modern Brazilian vaccines with a documented introduction date of 1887, made from material collected in an 1866 outbreak of "cowpox" in France, are more similar to horsepox than other strains of vaccinia. Five smallpox vaccines manufactured in the United States in 1859–1873 are most similar to each other and horsepox, as well as the 1902 Mulford vaccine. One of the 1859–1873 vaccines was identified as a novel strain of horsepox, containing a complete gene from the 1976 horsepox sample that has deletions in vaccinia.

=== Wild relatives ===
There are several separate groups of viruses that cause cowpox with species in between. The type of cowpox found in England is not very closely related to vaccinia, but a group found in continental Europe is. It is unclear how its similarity to vaccinia came to be: either they represent an escape of vaccine-derived strains into the wild or they themselves may be the wild ancestors of vaccine strains of vaccinia.

Rabbitpox is considered part of the O. vaccinia species. It branched out prior to the divergence between Dryvax and Ankara. The extinct horsepox appears to branch among South American vaccinia (including one vaccine escape) strains, but its more complete genome suggests that it should have branched out earlier. Buffalopox is similar to rabbitpox, though the determination of its branching-point is heavily influenced by the number of viral genomes used due to the vaccinia tree's root-point changing.

An alternative way of analyzing the ancestry of these viruses is to use a phylogenetic network, which has no root and takes into account the possibility of hybrid (by recombination) viruses; in this view it is more clear that no single virus appears as the "earliest-branching". Under population structure analysis, main ancestry components can be broken down into components labelled Horsepox/Mütter/Mulford, IHD-W, Dryvax (and USA infections), Tian Tan, Tashkent, Lister, MVA, Brazilian infections (cattle and human), and [South] Asian infections (buffalo and human). Of these, the horsepox and Tian Tan ancestries exhibit low genetic drift from the hypothetial common ancestor.

== Common strains ==
This is a list of some of the well-characterized vaccinia strains used for research and vaccination.

Lister (also known as Elstree)
the English vaccine strain used by Leslie Collier to develop heat stable vaccine in powdered form. Used as the basis for vaccine production during the World Health Organization Smallpox Eradication Campaign (SEC)
Dryvax (also known as "Wyeth")
the vaccine strain previously used in the United States, produced by Wyeth. Used in the SEC, it was replaced in 2008 by ACAM2000 (see below), produced by Acambis. It was produced as preparations of calf lymph which was freeze-dried and treated with antibiotics.
EM63
Russian strain used in the SEC
ACAM2000
The current strain in use in the US, produced by Acambis. ACAM2000 was derived from a clone of a Dryvax virus by plaque purification. It is produced in cultures of Vero cells.
Modified vaccinia Ankara (also known as MVA)
a highly attenuated (not virulent) strain created by passaging chorioallantois vaccinia Ankara (CVA) several hundred times in chicken embryo fibroblasts. Unlike some other vaccinia strains it does not make immunodeficient mice sick and therefore may be safer to use in humans who have weaker immune systems due to being very young, very old, having HIV/AIDS, etc.
LC16m8
an attenuated strain developed and currently used in Japan
CV-1
an attenuated strain developed in the United States and used there in the late 1960s- 1970s
Western Reserve
Result of passaging the NYCBH (New York City Board of Health) "stock 2" human-vaccine strain in mice. Highly virulent in mice.
Copenhagen
First strain to be completely sequenced. Used by Sementis as viral vector.
Connaught Laboratories (Canada)
...
Tashkent
Old vaccine strain discontinued due to side effects.
Tian Tan
Widely used in China, claimed origin inconsistent with vaccinia identity.
Horsepox
A lineage thought to be extinct, with the sole sequenced representative taken from a Mongolian horse in 1976. Has been reconstructed and found to be avirluent in mice yet still immunogenic. Closely related to a 1902 vaccine strain from H. K. Mulford Company and a 1866 vaccine sample from the Mütter Museum.
Beaugency lymph
Obtained from spontaneous cases of cowpox in France in 1866 and distributed worldwide. Is ancestral to Dryvax and IOC vaccines according to kept records.

== See also ==
- B13R (virus protein)
