= Taterapox virus =

Orthopoxvirus taterapox

Virus classification
- (unranked): Virus
- Realm: Varidnaviria
- Kingdom: Bamfordvirae
- Phylum: Nucleocytoviricota
- Class: Pokkesviricetes
- Order: Chitovirales
- Family: Poxviridae
- Genus: Orthopoxvirus
- Species: Orthopoxvirus taterapox

Species of Orthopoxvirus

Taterapox virus (TATV) is a poxvirus which mainly infects gerbils. It is about 250 nm in length and 200 nm in width, with an roughly oval or brick-shaped appearance. It is phylogenetically the closest relative to the variola virus.

== Discovery ==
In 1968, taterapox virus was isolated from a wild Kemp's gerbil (Tatera kempii) during a smallpox outbreak in Dahomey in West Africa, thus the name. It was described in 1975. The virus caused a fever in a rhesus macaque, though no skin rash was developed.

== Infection ==
The natural host of taterapox virus remains uncertain, though it likely includes gerbils. Most viruses within the genus Orthopoxvirus are capable of infecting multiple hosts—with the notable exceptions of variola virus (smallpox) and camelpox virus, both of which have lost certain ancestral genes—suggesting that Taterapox virus might also have a broad host range. Conversely, some in vitro studies indicate a more limited host range, suggesting the virus may be evolving toward the host-restricted characteristics seen in its relative, the variola virus. It is currently believed to infect various African rodents, including gerbils.

Infected gerbils, as well as wild-type laboratory mice, remain asymptomatic when exposed to taterapox virus. Under laboratory conditions, the virus can replicate in primate cell lines such as the BSC40 African green monkey kidney cell line.

== Evolution ==
The variola virus likely evolved from a taterapox-like ancestor, but the time at which the VARV strains diverged from ancient TATV strains remains undetermined. One study suggests that this evolutionary split likely occurred between 68,000 and 16,000 years ago.

Another estimate suggests that the divergence between the VARV and TATV occurred 3,000 to 4,000 years ago. This aligns with archaeological and historical evidence, such as the earliest records of smallpox in Indian texts from 1500 BCE and Chinese texts from 1122 BCE, as well as archaeological findings like the mummy of Ramses V, who died in 1145 BCE, which indicate that smallpox was a human disease with a relatively recent origin.

If one assumes a mutation rate similar to that of herpesviruses, the divergence date between VARV and TATV would be estimated at 50,000 years ago. While this is consistent with other published estimates, it implies that the archaeological and historical record is highly incomplete. More accurate estimates of the mutation rates for these viruses are needed.
