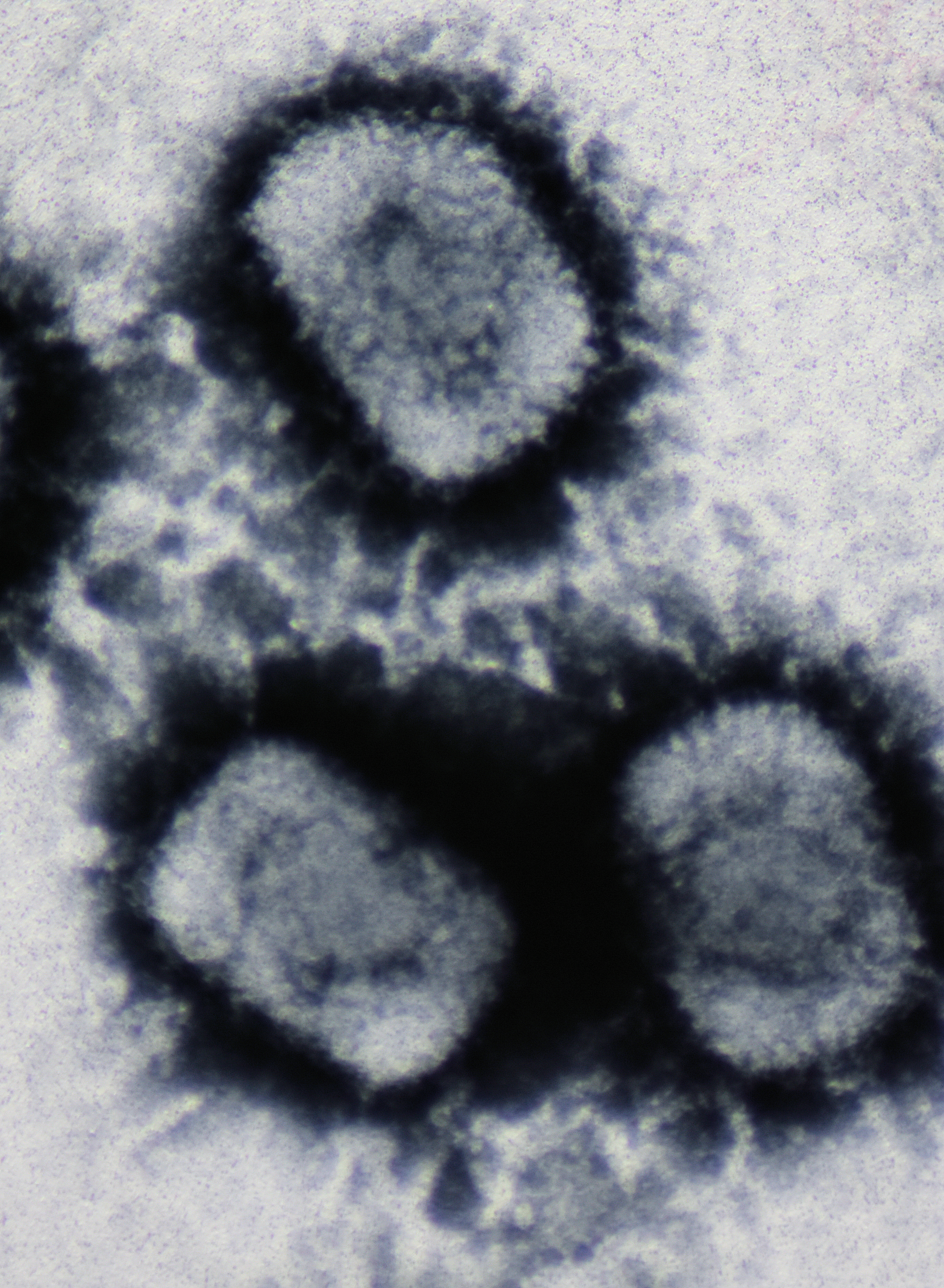
- Electron micrograph of three Cowpox virus particles

Virus classification
- (unranked): Virus
- Realm: Varidnaviria
- Kingdom: Bamfordvirae
- Phylum: Nucleocytoviricota
- Class: Pokkesviricetes
- Order: Chitovirales
- Family: Poxviridae
- Genus: Orthopoxvirus
- Species: Orthopoxvirus cowpox

= Cowpox =

Disease of humans and animals

Cowpox
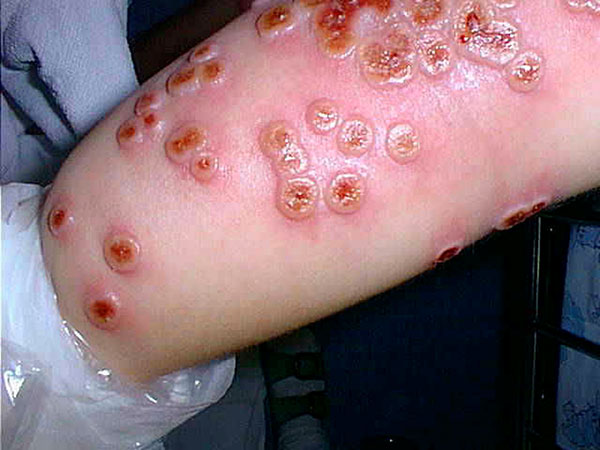
- Cowpox lesions on patient's forearm on day 7 after onset of illness. The hemagglutinin gene of the isolate clustered with a Russian cowpox virus strain, and more distantly with other cowpox and vaccinia virus strains. The patient's dog had orthopoxvirus-specific antibodies, indicating a possible transmission route.
- Specialty: Infectious diseases, veterinary medicine

Cowpox is an infectious disease caused by the Cowpox virus (CPXV). It presents with large blisters in the skin, a fever and swollen glands, historically typically following contact with an infected cow, though in the last several decades more often (though overall rarely) from infected cats. The hands and face are most frequently affected and the spots are generally very painful.

The virus, part of the genus Orthopoxvirus, is closely related to Vaccinia virus. The virus is zoonotic, meaning that it is transferable between species, such as from cat to human. The transferral of the disease was first observed in dairy workers who touched the udders of infected cows and consequently developed the signature pustules on their hands. Cowpox is more commonly found in animals other than bovines, such as rodents. Cowpox is similar to, but much milder than, the highly contagious and often deadly smallpox disease. Its close resemblance to the mild form of smallpox and the observation that dairy farmers were immune to smallpox inspired the modern smallpox vaccine, created and administered by English physician Edward Jenner.

The first description of cowpox was given by Jenner in 1798. "Vaccination" is derived from the Latin adjective vaccinus, meaning "of or from the cow". Once vaccinated, a patient develops antibodies that make them immune to cowpox, but they also develop immunity to the smallpox virus, or Variola virus. The cowpox vaccinations and later incarnations proved so successful that in 1980, the World Health Organization announced that smallpox was the first disease to be eradicated by vaccination efforts worldwide. Other orthopox viruses remain prevalent in certain communities and continue to infect humans, such as the cowpox virus in Europe and monkeypox virus in Central and West Africa.

The virus is found in Europe, and mainly in the UK. Human cases today are very rare and most often contracted from domestic cats. The virus is not commonly found in cattle; the reservoir hosts for the virus are woodland rodents, particularly voles. From these rodents, domestic cats contract and transmit the virus to humans. The incubation period is 9 to 10 days. The virus is prevalent in late summer and autumn.

== Infection ==
=== Signs and symptoms ===
Cowpox symptoms are similar in whichever host they infect: cow, cat, human. Cowpox symptoms include round, pus filled lesions on the skin at the site of infection. They tend to occur on the udders or teats of cows.

Symptoms in cats include lesions on the face, neck, forelimbs, and paws, and less commonly upper respiratory tract infections.

Symptoms of infection with cowpox virus in humans are localized, pustular lesions generally found on the hands and limited to the site of introduction. In some cases, the infected person can develop a mild fever or inflammation around the lesions. Cowpox can be transferred from human to human by contact of the infected site to another individual.

=== Pathology ===
Cowpox is very similar in pathology and structure in contrast to small pox. However, cowpox has increased activity in between the ectoderm and endoderm layers of the human skin.

=== Prevention ===
Today, the virus is found in Europe, mainly in the UK. Human cases are very rare (though in 2010 a laboratory worker contracted cowpox) and most often contracted from domestic cats. Human infections usually remain localized and self-limiting, but can become fatal in immunosuppressed patients. The virus is not commonly found in cattle; the reservoir hosts for the virus are woodland rodents, particularly voles.

Immunity to cowpox is gained when the smallpox vaccine is administered. Although the vaccine now uses vaccinia virus, this group of orthopoxviruses are similar enough that the body becomes immune to both cow- and smallpox.

== Medical use ==
Naturally occurring cases of cowpox were not common, but it was discovered that the vaccine could be "carried" in humans and reproduced and disseminated human-to-human. Jenner's original vaccination used lymph from the cowpox pustule on a milkmaid, and subsequent "arm-to-arm" vaccinations applied the same principle. As this transfer of human fluids came with its own set of complications, a safer manner of producing the vaccine was first introduced in Italy. The new method used cows to manufacture the vaccine using a process called "retrovaccination", in which a heifer was inoculated with humanized cowpox virus, and it was passed from calf to calf to produce massive quantities efficiently and safely. This then led to the next incarnation, "true animal vaccine", which used the same process but began with naturally occurring cowpox virus, and not the humanized form.

This method of production proved to be lucrative and was taken advantage of by many entrepreneurs needing only calves and seed lymph from an infected cow to manufacture crude versions of the vaccine. W. F. Elgin of the National Vaccine Establishment presented his slightly refined technique to the Conference of State and Provincial Boards of Health of North America. A tuberculosis-free calf, stomach shaved, would be bound to an operating table, where incisions would be made on its lower body. Glycerinated lymph from a previously inoculated calf was spread along the cuts. After a few days, the cuts would have scabbed or crusted over. The crust was softened with sterilized water and mixed with glycerin, which disinfected it, then stored hermetically sealed in capillary tubes for later use.

At some point, the virus in use was no longer cowpox, but vaccinia. Scientists have not determined exactly when the change or mutation occurred, but the effects of vaccinia and cowpox virus as vaccine are nearly the same.

== Life cycle ==
Cowpox is a double stranded DNA virus. The virus does have an envelope that surrounds the virion. The cowpox's genome allows the virus to encode its own transcription machinery along with its own DNA replication machinery. The replication then takes place in the cytoplasm after the virus is in the cell and the virion is uncoated. The virion is then assembled and released from the host cell.

== Genome ==
The genome for the CPXV is over 220kbp. This makes it the largest genome in the Orthopoxvirus species. It can be divided into three different regions. There are two end regions called R1 and R2 and a main central region that is roughly half of the size of the genome. There are also inverted terminal repeats that are located at the terminal sites of the genome and measure around 10kbp. These inverted terminal repeats can then be divided into two more distinct regions. The first section is around 7.5kbp long and includes a coding region. The other section includes a terminal region that can be repeated up to as many times as thirty and is composed of 50 nucleotides. The CPXV genome encodes only 30-40% of products of which are involved in the pathogenesis of the virus. The CPXV genome has the most complete set of genes out of all of the orthopoxviruses. This unique feature of CPXV makes it ideal to be able to mutate into different strains of the virus.

The genome is arranged so that both of the ends contain the genes responsible for evading the defenses from the immune system of the host which is only activated in the extracellular portion. These receptors are able to be stopped by cytokine and chemokine secretion by blocking the cytokine and chemokine found extracellularly. This is the process responsible for attachment and entry of the virion into the host cell. Because of the large size of the genome, it makes the virus more likely and capable to fight back against the immunes system defenses. Out of all of the poxviruses, CPXV has the most cytokine responses that fight back against the immune system. It encodes cytokine receptors such as TNF, CrmB, CrmC, CrmD, and CrmE proteins. Another set of receptors that CPXV have are lymphotoxins such as IL-1ß, IFN-y, IFN 1, β-chemokines, and IL-18. However, not all of the receptors of CPXV are still not known. CPXV also encodes four tumor necrosis factors (TNF) and lymphotoxin which are the biggest group of homologous receptors for the virus. These receptors play a crucial role that are involved with the immune system.

== Host interaction ==
CPXV creates two different types of inclusion bodies inside cells. All of the poxviruses have basophilic inclusions also called B-type inclusion bodies. The B-type inclusion bodies contain the factory where the virus produces necessary elements for the replication and maturation of the virion. CPXV has another inclusion body that is unique to only some Chordopoxviruses called acidophilic inclusion bodies also called A-type inclusion bodies (ATIs). The ATIs are encoded by the cpxv158 gene and is then made the protein ATIP which is a late protein. However, the importance of these ATIs in the life cycle are still not well known or understood and research is still being done to better understand them. It is known that replication can still continue without the cpxv158 gene, and that the replication cycle shows no difference between a fully encoded virion versus the virion that had deleted cwpx158 gene. However, with studies done on mice, the lesions that were caused by the CPXV-BR△ati were able to heal faster due to less tissue that was lost than the CPXV-BR lesions that took longer to heal and lost more tissue. This suggests that this gene helps supports the idea that ATIs are partly involved in how the host responds to the virus infection.

Another way that the virus is able to control and infect the host is by regulating cellular signaling pathways. During the infection, CPXV is known to use MEK/ERK/1/2/Egr-1, JNK1/2, and PI3K/Akt pathways. Some of these pathways are not unique only to CPXV, but how they function in response to the host is unique to this virus.

One notable protein in the CPXV is the p28 protein. It is made up of 242 amino acids and contains two domains, and N terminal KilA-N and a C-terminal RING domain. One of those domains, the N-terminal KilA-N domain, allows for DNA to bind to it. The KilA-N domain facilitates this p28 protein that is translated early in the replication cycle in the cytoplasm and is then located in the cytoplasm for the rest of the life cycle of the virus. There is current research still being done to determine if the p28 protein could be a requital for an essential macrophage factor that is needed for the DNA replication.

== Natural history ==
Phylogeny of Orthopoxvirus

- - NW
    - O. racoonpox, RPXV
    - - O. volepox, VPXV
      - O. skunkpox, SPXV
  - OW
    - "O. borealpox", AKPV
    - - O. akhmetapox, AKMV
      - - - O. ectromelia, ECTV
          - O. abatinomacacapox, OPVA
        - - O. cowpox CPXV, sensu stricto
          - - - O. monkeypox, MPXV
              - - Vaccinia-like "Cowpox"
                - O. vaccinia, VACV
            - - Smallpox-like "Cowpox"
              - - O. variola, VARV (India 1964)
                - - O. camelpox, CMLV
                  - O. taterapox, TATV

Maximum likelihood estimation using whole genomes, Molteni et al. (2023)

Viruses that cause the disease diagnosed as "cowpox" do not neatly fit into one monophyletic group that excludes viruses that cause other poxes such as mpox and smallpox; in other words, it forms a paraphyletic group. There are at least three separate lineages of cowpox: a "traditional" lineage that has been divided into clades 1 and 2, a "variola-like" lineage that clusters with the smallpox virus, and a "vaccinia-like" lineage that is sister to the vaccinia virus. It is unclear how the similarity to vaccinia came to be: either they represent an escape of vaccine-derived strains into the wild or they themselves may be the wild ancestors of vaccine strains of vaccinia.

== Human history ==
=== Discovery ===
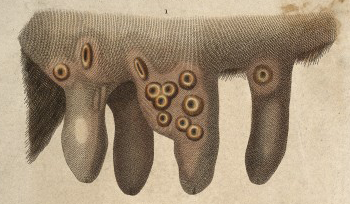
Cowpox (variola vaccina) pustules on a cow's udder

In the years from 1770 to 1790, at least six people who had contact with a cow had independently tested the possibility of using the cowpox vaccine as an immunization for smallpox in humans. Among them were the English farmer Benjamin Jesty, in Dorset in 1774 and the German teacher Peter Plett in 1791. Jesty inoculated his wife and two young sons with cowpox, in a successful effort to immunize them to smallpox, an epidemic of which had arisen in their town. His patients who had contracted and recovered from the similar but milder cowpox (mainly milkmaids), seemed to be immune not only to further cases of cowpox, but also to smallpox. By scratching the fluid from cowpox lesions into the skin of healthy individuals, he was able to immunize those people against smallpox.

Reportedly, farmers and people working regularly with cattle and horses were often spared during smallpox outbreaks. Investigations by the British Army in 1790 showed that horse-mounted troops were less infected by smallpox than infantry, due to probable exposure to the similar horsepox virus (Variola equina). By the early 19th century, more than 100,000 people in Great Britain had been vaccinated. The arm-to-arm method of transfer of the cowpox vaccine was also used to distribute Jenner's vaccine throughout the Spanish Empire. Spanish king Charles IV's daughter had been stricken with smallpox in 1798, and after she recovered, he arranged for the rest of his family to be vaccinated.

In 1803, the king, convinced of the benefits of the vaccine, ordered his personal physician Francis Xavier de Balmis, to deliver it to the Spanish dominions in North and South America. To maintain the vaccine in an available state during the voyage, the physician recruited 22 young boys who had never had cowpox or smallpox before, aged three to nine years, from the orphanages of Spain. During the trip across the Atlantic, de Balmis vaccinated the orphans in a living chain. Two children were vaccinated immediately before departure, and when cowpox pustules had appeared on their arms, material from these lesions was used to vaccinate two more children.

In 1796, English medical practitioner Edward Jenner tested the theory that cowpox could protect someone from being infected by smallpox. There had long been speculation regarding the origins of Jenner's variolae vaccinae, until DNA sequencing data showed close similarities between horsepox and cowpox viruses. Jenner noted that farriers sometimes milked cows and that material from the equine disease could produce a vesicular disease in cows from which variolae vaccinae was derived. Contemporary accounts provide support for Jenner's speculation that the vaccine probably originated as an equine disease called "grease". Although cowpox originates on the udder of cows, Jenner took his sample from a milkmaid, Sarah Nelmes.

Jenner extracted the pus of one of the lesions formed by cowpox on Nelmes to James Phipps, an eight-year-old boy who had never had smallpox. He eventually developed a scab and fever that was manageable. Approximately six weeks later, Jenner then introduced an active sample of the smallpox virus into Phipps to test the theory. After being observed for an extended amount of time, it was recorded that Phipps did not receive a reaction from it. Although Jenner was not the first person to conceive the notion of cowpox protecting against the smallpox virus, his experiment proved the theory. Jenner named this procedure "vaccination" from the Latin for cow, vacca.

The number of vaccinations among people of that era increased drastically. It was widely considered to be a relatively safer procedure compared to the mainstream inoculation. Although Jenner was propelled into the spotlight from the vaccination popularity, he mainly focused on science behind why the cowpox allowed persons to not be infected by smallpox. The honour of the discovery of the vaccination is often attributed to Benjamin Jesty, but he was no scientist and did not repeat or publish his findings. He is considered to be the first to use cowpox as a vaccination, though the term vaccination was not invented yet.

During the midst of the smallpox outbreak, Jesty transferred pieces of cow udder which he knew had been infected with cowpox into the skin of his family members in the hopes of protecting them. Jesty did not publicize his findings, and Jenner, who performed his first inoculation 22 years later and publicized his findings, assumed credit. It is said that Jenner made this discovery by himself, possibly without knowing previous accounts 20 years earlier. Although Jesty may have been the first to discover it, Jenner made vaccination widely accessible and has therefore been credited for its invention.

=== Vaccination ===
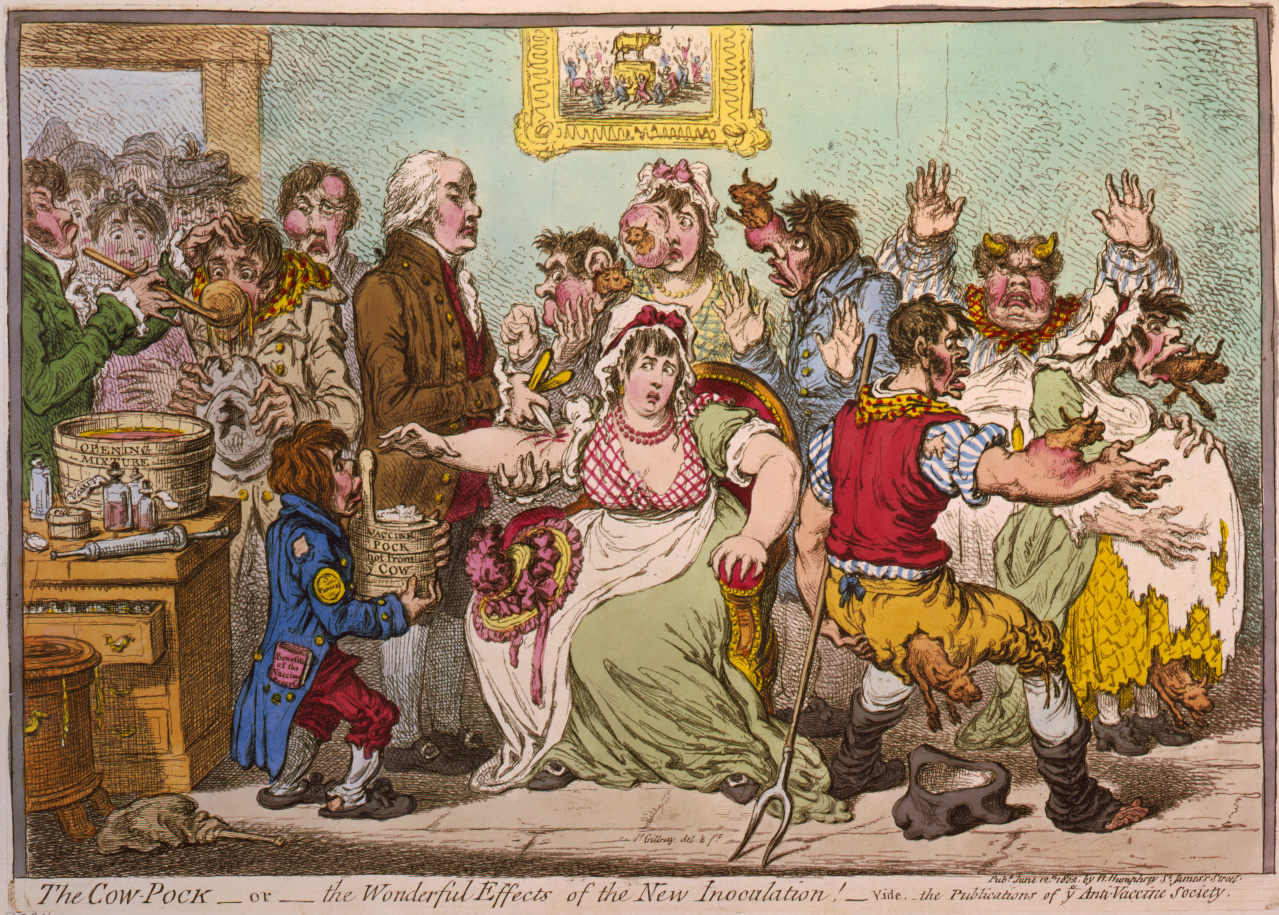
In The Cow-Pock—or—the Wonderful Effects of the New Inoculation! (1802), James Gillray caricatured recipients of the vaccine developing cow-like appendages.

After inoculation, vaccination using the cowpox virus became the primary defense against smallpox. After infection by the cowpox virus, the body (usually) gains the ability to recognize the similar smallpox virus from its antigens and is able to fight the smallpox disease much more efficiently.

The cowpox virus contains 222 thousand base pairs of DNA, which contains the information for about 203-204 genes. This makes cowpox one of the most complicated viruses known. A significant number of these genes give instructions for key parts of the human immune system, giving a clue as to why the closely related smallpox is so lethal. The vaccinia virus now used for smallpox vaccination is sufficiently different from the cowpox virus found in the wild as to be considered a separate virus.

==== British Parliament ====
While the vaccination's popularity increased exponentially, so did its monetary value. This was realized by the British Parliament, which compensated Jenner 10,000 pounds for the vaccination. In addition, they later compensated Jenner an additional 20,000 pounds. In the coming years, Jenner continued advocacy for his vaccination over the still popular inoculation. Eventually, in 1840, the inoculation became banned in England and was replaced with the cowpox vaccination as the main medical solution to combat smallpox. The cowpox vaccination saved the British Army thousands of soldiers, by making them immune to the effects of smallpox in upcoming wars. The cowpox also saved the United Kingdom thousands of pounds.

==== Kinepox ====
Kinepox is an alternative term for the smallpox vaccine used in early 19th-century America. Popularized by Jenner in the late 1790s, kinepox was a far safer method for inoculating people against smallpox than the previous method, variolation, which still resulted in a form of the disease, albeit milder, that still had a fatality rate of 1–2%.

In a famous letter to Meriwether Lewis in 1803, Thomas Jefferson instructed the Lewis and Clark Expedition to "carry with you some matter of the kine-pox; inform those of them with whom you may be, of its efficacy as a preservative from the smallpox; & encourage them in the use of it..." Jefferson had developed an interest in protecting American Indians from smallpox, having been aware of epidemics along the Missouri River during the previous century. A year before his special instructions to Lewis, Jefferson had persuaded a visiting delegation of North American Indian chieftains to be vaccinated with kinepox during the winter of 1801–1802. Unfortunately, Lewis never got the opportunity to use kinepox during the pair's expedition, as it had become inadvertently inactive—a common occurrence in a time before vaccines were stabilized with preservatives such as glycerol or kept at refrigeration temperatures.

=== Opposition to vaccination ===
The majority of the population at the time accepted the up-and-coming vaccination. However, there was still opposition from individuals who were reluctant to change from the inoculations. In addition, there became a growing concern from parties who were worried about the unknown repercussions of infecting a human with an animal disease. One way individuals expressed their discontent was to draw comics that sometimes depicted small cows growing from the sites of vaccination. Others publicly advocated for the continuance of the inoculations; however, this was not because of their discontent for the vaccinations. Some of their reluctance had to do with an apprehensiveness for change. They had become so familiar with the process, outcome, positives, and negatives of inoculations that they did not want to be surprised by the outcome or effects of the vaccinations. Jenner soon eased their minds after extensive trials. However, others advocated against vaccinations for different reasons. Because of the high price of inoculation, Jenner experienced very few common folk who were not willing to accept the vaccination. Due to this, Jenner found many subjects for his tests. He was able to publish his results in a pamphlet in 1798: An Inquiry into the Causes and Effects of Variolae Vaccinae, a Disease, Discovered in some of the Western Counties of England particularly Gloucestershire, and known by the Name of Cow Pox.

== General sources ==
- Peck DR (2002). Or Perish in the Attempt: Wilderness Medicine in the Lewis & Clark Expedition. Farcountry Press. ISBN 978-1-56037-226-4.
