= Raccoonpox virus =

Virus classification
- (unranked): Virus
- Realm: Varidnaviria
- Kingdom: Bamfordvirae
- Phylum: Nucleocytoviricota
- Class: Pokkesviricetes
- Order: Chitovirales
- Family: Poxviridae
- Genus: Orthopoxvirus
- Species: Orthopoxvirus raccoonpox

Species of virus

Raccoonpox virus (RCN) is a double-stranded DNA virus and a member of the Orthopoxvirus genus in the family Poxviridae and subfamily Chordopoxvirinae. Vertebrates are the natural host of Chordopoxvirinae subfamily viruses. More specifically, raccoons are the natural hosts of RCN. RCN was isolated in 1961 from the upper respiratory tissues of two raccoons in a group of 92 observably healthy raccoons (Procyon lotor) trapped close to Aberdeen, Maryland.

Of the 92 apparently healthy raccoons trapped near Aberdeen, Maryland in 1961, 22 had sera containing RCN HA1 antibodies. The sera partially cross-reacted with a vaccinia virus HA preparation, suggesting a close relation between the viruses. Unlike the HA of other vaccinia-like viruses, the HA of RCN did not cross-react with monkeypox virus HA. Though RPV is a close relative of vaccinia and cowpox viruses, it is distinct enough to be classified as a novel entity in the vaccinia/variola subgroup of poxviruses.

== Viral classification ==
RCN is a double-stranded DNA virus. It is an orthopoxvirus in the family Poxviridae and subfamily Chordopoxvirinae.

== Genealogy/ evolution ==
DNA sequences encoding the HA's of RCN and VV (vaccinia virus) strain WR (western reserve) as well as HA's of VV, RCN, VPX (vole poxvirus), and SKP (skunk poxvirus) are rather divergent. Cross-hybridizations suggest that the HA of RCN, VPX, and SKP are separately diverged and that the HA of VV, ECT (ectromelia virus), VAR (variola virus), and most other orthopoxviruses are closely related. Hybridizations also indicate that orthopoxvirus regulatory sequences flanking the HA ORF are rather conserved. RCN vaccine-laden baits increased antibodies against plague in both antigens.

In contrast to known members of the poxvirus group, RCN is serologically (diagnostic identification of antibodies in serum) unique in its ability to cross-react with a monkeypox agent.

== Structure ==
RCN is an orthopoxvirus. It is an enveloped virus with brick-shaped virion geometries. It has a linear genomic arrangement and monopartite genomic segmentation. It is a large virus particle with a genome of 150 to 300 kbp of dsDNA (Ropp). A hairpin loop exists at either end of the genome. The Guanine/Cytosine (G-C) content of the genome is 35%. There are large regions within the RCN virus genome that cross hybridize between members of the genus.

Differences between terminal region patterns of DNA restriction enzyme digests of different RCN isolates suggest that varied passaging has promoted the advancement of polymorphisms since the virus was first isolated in 1961. RCN tandem repeat sequences found on the terminal Sal1 restriction fragment were found to be distinct from varicella and cowpox virus, lending further support to the claim that RCN is a distinct virus within the orthopoxviruses. In order to distinguish between the orthopoxvirus species and strains of RCN, PCR is used. The distinction is drawn based on the sequences encoding the hemagglutinin (HA) protein.

== Genome replication cycle ==
Entry into Cell: The virion attaches to the cell surface as the viral proteins come into contact with host cell glycosaminoglycan receptors and is taken into the cell through endocytosis. From here it must enter into the cytoplasm. The replication of RCN occurs in the cytoplasm- never in the nucleus.

Replication and Transcription: The replication and transcription of the viral genome occur in the cytoplasm. Genome replication begins with the uncoating of the virus core as it comes into contact with the plasma membrane. Once uncoated, the viral DNA is expressed and replication follows. Replication of the RCN genome occurs through the strand displacement method.

Assembly and Release: Viral assembly occurs in the cytoplasm. The release of the mature virus particle always results in lysing of the host cell.

== Modulation of host processes ==
RCN has a negative effect on the mRNA synthesis of the host cell.

== Identification ==
RCN isolated from 2 of 92 raccoons in Maryland, proposed to be an orthopoxvirus when it was noted that a RCN hemagglutinin preparation reacted with VV (vaccinia virus) hyperimmune rabbit serum. However, it was later reported that sera from 22 of the raccoons reacted highly with a RCN hemagglutinin preparation, but hemagglutinin preparations of VV or monkeypox virus (MPV) showed little or no cross-reactivity.

Identification can be performed via agglutination with cardiolipin sensitive chicken erythrocytes.

== Associated disease ==
RCN infected Strain 143 human osteosarcoma cells produce cytoplasmic A-type inclusions (ATIs) where a number of mature virions are lodged to maintain viral infectivity even if the cell lyses.

== Pathogenesis ==
Cell lines infected with RCN, volepox virus (VPX), or skunk poxvirus (SKP), and other orthopoxviruses that are all HAD+ (hemagglutinating viruses based on adherence to erythrocytes to infected cells), form large syncytia (multinucleated cells that can result from the fusion of uninuclear cells), suggest that, conformationally, distinct functional HA's influence polykaryocytosis (process of fusion).

RCN has cytopathic effects (CPE) in monkey kidney tissue cultures (MKTC). Seen on 11h day of incubation, characterized by rounding and granular appearance of cells. When inoculated on the chorioallantoic membrane (CAM) of 12-day embryonated hens’ eggs, the RCN produced many small discrete embedded poxes.

== Tropism ==
Raccoon poxvirus has been shown to infect Strain 143 human osteosarcoma cells grown in monolayer culture, producing A-type inclusions in the cytoplasm as is typical of poxviruses in later multiplication cycles.

To date, most oral vaccines cannot withstand the alimentary tract or do not elicit strong mucosal immune response. Poxviruses are good candidates for the development of wildlife vaccines. They infect mucosal tissue and retain stability when disrupted by the environment.

== Use ==
RCN has been developed as a recombinant for the delivery of vaccines against the plague (caused by bacterium Yersinia pestis), feline panleukopenia virus, rabies virus and other pathogens in wildlife and domestic animals. Controlling diseases such as the plague in wildlife and domestic animals is important to reducing its transmission to humans.

RCN is favored as a vector for wildlife and veterinary management over other potential poxvirus vectors because it triggers an immune response when it is taken in through mucosal routes, which is important for the widespread immunization of wildlife. Recombinant RCN (rRCN) vaccines been given to a number of mammalian species such as mice, raccoons, cats and sheep without side effects. The rRCN rabies virus glycoprotein recombinant vaccine was effective when given to sheep both intradermally and intramuscularly. Fortunately, the rRCN vaccine did relatively little harm to sheep when ingested orally, suggesting that rRCN vaccines used for wildlife management delivered as oral baits would be safe if accidentally ingested by sheep. Further studies are needed to determine the effect of ingestion of oral bait rRCN vaccines by non-target farm and domestic animals. Particular rRCN vaccines have been designed to effectively confer protective immunity against multiple pathogens. rRCN vaccines have been successful too in treating rabies virus in mice. These vaccines functioned by either expressing the rabies virus internal structural nucleoprotein (RCN-N) or by expressing the rabies virus glycoprotein (RCN-G).

RCN, and all poxviridae viruses, are especially useful in creating vaccines because they create cost-effective, stable, multivalent vaccines that are easy to manufacture, and can be administered through multiple routes. It is believed that RCN vaccination triggers action from both the humoral and cell mediated immune responses and that this immunity is long term after only one vaccination.

Poxvirus recombinant vectors have been implemented to successfully vaccinate against heterologous bacterial, viral, and parasitic pathogens upon use in animals (e.g. raccoons) and humans.

Uses in veterinary medicine: have potential use for this treatment technique in infectious disease, ex vivo therapies, and cancer immunotherapy. *Under clinical trials as well as some licensed commercialization at time of publication.

RCN viral vectors have the potential to replace expensive and labor-intensive pesticide applications in disease prevention.

Recombinant RCN vaccine promote effective immunity against plague (Y. pestis) via the oral route, could provide a practical, alternative approach, although more work is needed to determine the timing of vaccine, the duration of immunity provided, and the effects on nontarget animals.

RCN recombinants expressing rabies virus glycoprotein or nucleoprotein were created. Promoting rabies virus neutralizing antibodies in raccoons, dogs, cotton rats, rabbits, bobcats, and foxes; sometimes at lethal doses.

RCN is used as an oral delivery system for fraction 1 (F1) capsular antigen of Y. pestis. (replacement of thymidine kinase (TK)). RCN was successful in 50% of voluntary participants allowing them to survive subsequent challenges. RCN-vectored vaccine with the LcrV (V) gene, which can also provide protection against Y. pestis.
