= Orthopoxvirus =

Virus classification
- (unranked): Virus
- Realm: Varidnaviria
- Kingdom: Bamfordvirae
- Phylum: Nucleocytoviricota
- Class: Pokkesviricetes
- Order: Chitovirales
- Family: Poxviridae
- Subfamily: Chordopoxvirinae
- Genus: Orthopoxvirus

Species
- See text

Genus of viruses (poxes)

Orthopoxvirus is a genus of viruses in the family Poxviridae and subfamily Chordopoxvirinae. Vertebrates, including mammals and reptiles, and arthropods serve as natural hosts. There are 12 known species in this genus. Diseases associated with this genus include smallpox, cowpox, horsepox, camelpox, and mpox (monkeypox). The most widely known member of the genus is Variola virus, which causes smallpox. It was eradicated globally by 1977, through the use of Vaccinia virus as a vaccine. The most recently described species of orthopoxvirus is the Borealpox virus, first isolated in 2015.

== Microbiology ==
=== Structure ===
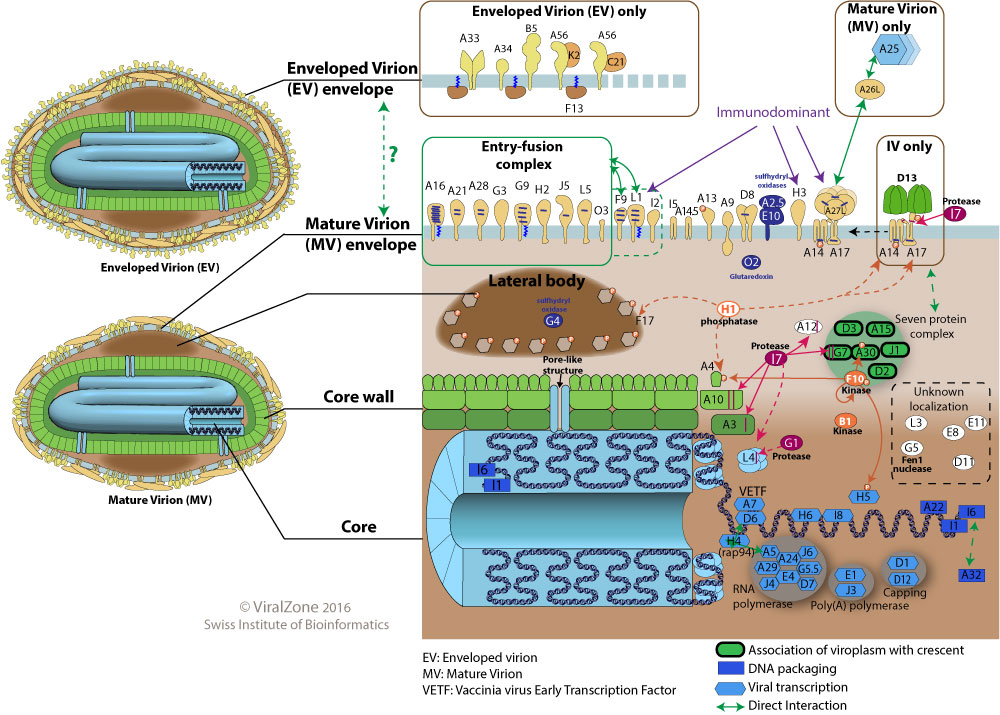
Schematic drawing of (cross section) of Orthopoxvirus virions (one enveloped, one not) and structural proteins

Orthopoxviruses are enveloped with brick-shaped geometries and virion dimensions around 200 nm wide and 250 nm long.

=== Genome ===
Member viruses have linear double-stranded DNA genomes around 170–250 kb in length.

=== Lifecycle ===
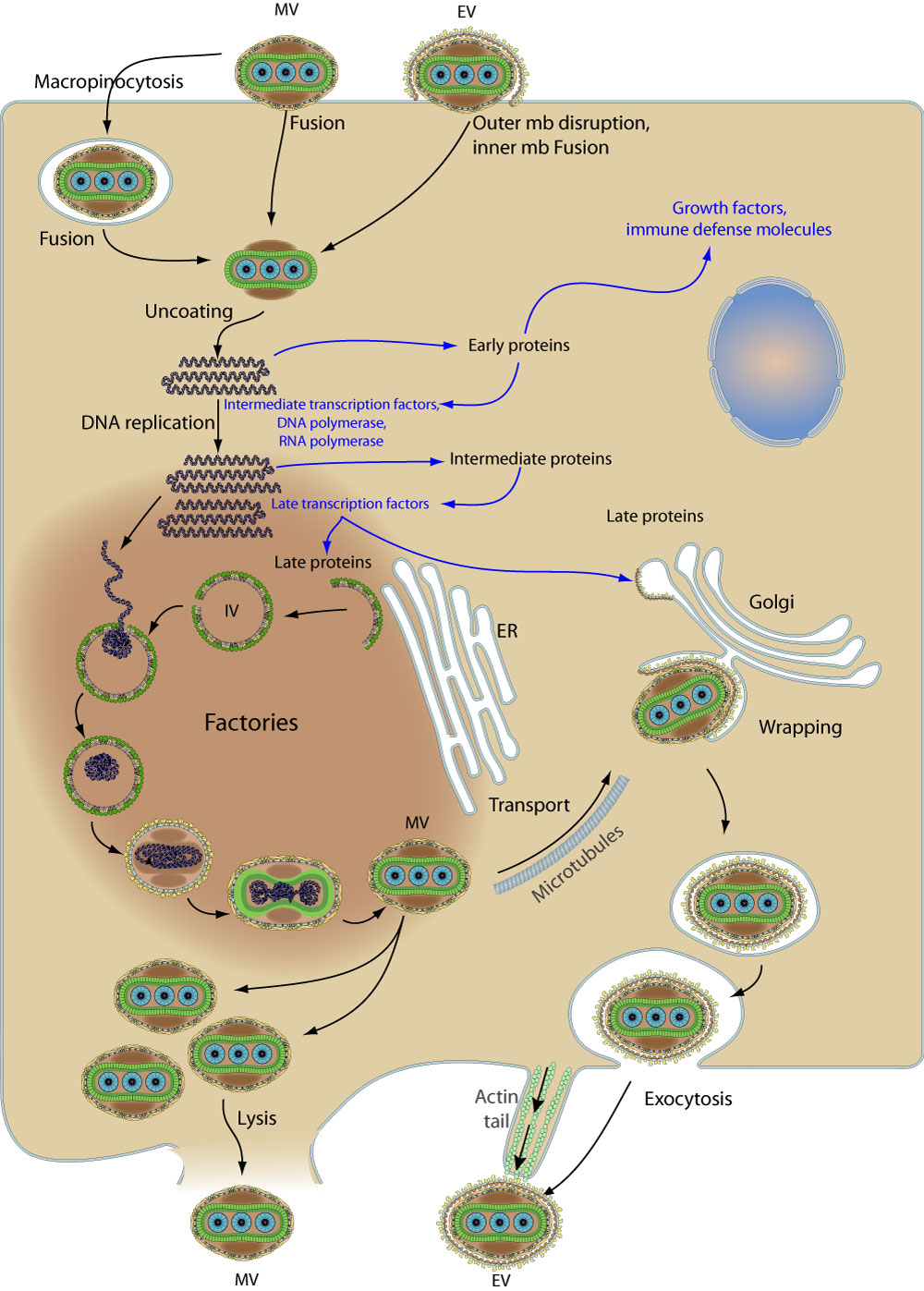
Orthopoxvirus replication cycle

Viral replication is cytoplasmic. Entry into the host cell is achieved by attachment of the viral proteins to host glycosaminoglycans (GAGs), which mediate cellular endocytosis of the virus. Fusion of the viral envelope with the plasma membrane releases the viral core into the host cytoplasm. Expression of early-phase genes by viral RNA polymerase begins at 30 minutes after infection. The viral core is completely uncoated as early expression ends, releasing the viral genome into the cytoplasm. At this point, intermediate genes are expressed, triggering genomic DNA replication by the viral DNA polymerase about 100 minutes post-infection. Replication follows the DNA strand displacement model. Late genes are expressed from 140 min to 48 hours postinfection, producing all viral structural proteins. Assembly of progeny virions begins in cytoplasmic viral factories, producing a spherical immature particle. This virus particle matures into the brick-shaped intracellular mature virion, which can be released upon cell lysis, or can acquire a second membrane from the Golgi apparatus and bud as extracellular enveloped virions. In this latter case, the virion is transported to the plasma membrane via microtubules.

=== Transmission ===
Natural hosts of orthopoxviruses are mammals and arthropods. Member viruses are transmitted by respiratory droplets, contact, and zoonosis.

== Distribution ==
Some orthopoxviruses, including the mpox, cowpox, and buffalopox viruses, have the ability to infect non-reservoir species. Others, such as ectromelia and camelpox viruses, are highly host-specific. Vaccinia virus, maintained in vaccine institutes and research laboratories, has a very wide host range. Vaccine-derived vaccinia has been found replicating in the wild in Brazil, where it has caused infections in rodents, cattle, and even humans. Following the eradication of variola virus, camelpox has become one of the most economically important Orthopoxvirus infections, because many subsistence-level nomadic communities depend heavily on camels.

== Taxonomy ==
The genus contains the following species, listed by scientific name and followed by the exemplar virus of the species:

- Orthopoxvirus abatinomacacapox, Orthopoxvirus Abatino
- Orthopoxvirus akhmetapox, Akhmeta virus
- Orthopoxvirus camelpox, Camelpox virus
- Orthopoxvirus cowpox, Cowpox virus
- Orthopoxvirus ectromelia, Ectromelia virus
- Orthopoxvirus monkeypox, Monkeypox virus
- Orthopoxvirus raccoonpox, Raccoonpox virus
- Orthopoxvirus skunkpox, Skunkpox virus
- Orthopoxvirus taterapox, Taterapox virus
- Orthopoxvirus vaccinia, Vaccinia virus
- Orthopoxvirus variola, Variola virus
- Orthopoxvirus volepox, Volepox virus

The related Borealpox virus, also known as Alaskapox virus, has not been classified as of 2024. It is phylogenetically nested into the Old World clade of Orthopoxvirus (see below).

=== Evolution ===
Among the path of evolution of the Orthopoxvirus species, many genes are truncated (but still functional), fragmented, or lost. Cowpox strains tend to have the most intact genes. Predicting the phylogeny by sequence or by gene content produces somewhat different results:

Orthopoxvirus phylogeny
By sequence

- Orthopoxvirus ectromelia
- - Orthopoxvirus cowpox, Germany and Brighton
  - - Orthopoxvirus taterapox, Orthopoxvirus camelpox, Orthopoxvirus variola
    - - Orthopoxvirus monkeypox
      - - Orthopoxvirus cowpox, GRI strain
        - Orthopoxvirus vaccinia, including rabbitpox and horsepox

By gene content

- Orthopoxvirus ectromelia
- - Orthopoxvirus cowpox
  - - Horsepox
    - - Orthopoxvirus vaccinia, including rabbitpox
      - - Orthopoxvirus variola
        - Orthopoxvirus taterapox, Orthopoxvirus camelpox, Orthopoxvirus monkeypox

Some of the differences in the two trees are attributed to the procedure of passage in producing vaccinia strains. The Modified vaccinia Ankara strain in this regard has much gene loss related to in vitro passage, and horsepox being a vaccinia strain found in a natural outbreak has less.

Newer phylogenies are:

Orthopoxvirus phylogeny
Babkin et al. (2022)
Molteni et al. (2023)
To be transcribed (Figure 3).

- - New World
    - O. racoonpox, RPXV
    - - O. volepox, VPXV
      - O. skunkpox, SPXV
  - Old World
    - "O. borealpox", AKPV
    - - O. akhmetapox, AKMV
      - - - O. ectromelia, ECTV
          - O. abatinomacacapox, OPVA
        - - O. cowpox CPXV, Germany
          - - - O. monkeypox, MPXV
              - - Vaccinia-like "Cowpox"
                - O. vaccinia, VACV (including rabbitpox and horsepox)
            - - Smallpox-like "Cowpox"
              - - O. variola, VARV (India 1964)
                - - O. camelpox, CMLV
                  - O. taterapox, TATV

Bayesian maximum clade credibility tree for the highly conserved central genome region, with molecular clock. Good agreement with the ML tree of the same region from the study.
Maximum likelihood estimation using whole genomes.

== Infection in humans ==
=== Zoonoses ===
Following the eradication of the human-specific variola virus (smallpox), all human Orthopoxvirus infections are zoonoses. Mpox occurs naturally only in Africa, particularly in the Democratic Republic of the Congo. However, human and prairie dog cases have occurred in the US due to contact with animals imported from Ghana, while in May 2022 an outbreak of mpox began spreading globally. Cowpox only occurs in Europe and adjacent Russian states, and despite its name, occurs only rarely in cattle. One common host is the domestic cat, from which human infections are most often acquired. Cowpox virus has also infected a variety of animals in European zoos, such as elephants, resulting in human infection.

=== Laboratory transmission ===
Aerosols of concentrated virus may result in Orthopoxvirus infection, especially in unimmunized individuals. In addition, needle sticks with concentrated virus or scratches from infected animals may result in local infection of the skin even in immunized individuals. Cowpox infection in Europe is an occupational hazard for veterinary workers, and to a lesser extent, farm workers.

=== Signs and symptoms ===
The initial symptoms of Orthopoxvirus infection include fever, malaise, head and body aches, and occasionally vomiting. With the exception of mpox infection, one lesion is the norm, although satellite lesions may be produced by accidental autoinoculation. Individual lesions, surrounded by inflammatory tissue, develop and progress through macules, papules, vesicles, and pustules, and eventually become dry crusts. (Lesions alone are not diagnostic for Orthopoxvirus infection and may be mistaken for zoonotic Parapoxvirus infections, anthrax or Herpesvirus infections.) With severe infections, severe edema and erythema may affect large areas of the body. Encephalitis (alteration of mental status and focal neurologic deficits), myelitis (upper- and lower-motor neuron dysfunction, sensory level, and bowel and bladder dysfunction), or both may result from Orthopoxvirus infection. Rarely, orthopoxviruses may be detected in cerebrospinal fluid.

Regarding specific Orthopoxvirus infections, human mpox most resembles mild smallpox. Human cowpox is a relatively severe localized infection. A survey of 54 cases reported three cases of generalized infection, including one death.

=== Treatment ===
Vaccinia-specific immunoglobulins may be administered to infected individuals. The only product currently available for treatment of complications of Orthopoxvirus infection is vaccinia immunoglobulin (VIG), which is an isotonic sterile solution of the immunoglobulin fraction of plasma from persons vaccinated with vaccinia virus. It is effective for treatment of eczema vaccinatum and certain cases of progressive vaccinia. However, VIG is contraindicated for the treatment of vaccinial keratitis. VIG is recommended for severe generalized vaccinia if the patient is extremely ill or has a serious underlying disease. VIG provides no benefit in the treatment of postvaccinal encephalitis and has no role in the treatment of smallpox. Current supplies of VIG are limited, and its use is reserved for treatment of vaccine complications with serious clinical manifestations. The recommended dosage of the currently available VIG is 0.6 ml/kg of body weight. VIG must be administered intramuscularly and is ideally administered as early as possible after the onset of symptoms. Because therapeutic doses of VIG might be substantial (e.g., 42 ml for a person weighing 70 kg), the product may be administered in divided doses over a 24- to 36-hour period. Doses can be repeated, usually at intervals of 2–3 days, until recovery begins (i.e., no new lesions appear). The CDC is currently the only source of VIG for civilians.

Certain antiviral compounds such as tecovirimat (ST-246) have been reported to be 100% active against vaccinia virus or other orthopoxviruses in vitro and among test animals. Tecovirimat has been granted orphan drug status by the Food and Drug Administration (FDA) and is currently under study to determine its safety and effectiveness in humans. Another example is brincidofovir. In June 2021, the FDA approved this drug for the treatment of smallpox in humans, making it the first drug approved for an effectively extinct mechanism of action. The decision followed a priority review by the agency, motivated by growing concern of potential bioweapon development. Since the target virus is eradicated the efficacy could not be directly verified but was inferred via proxy, animal survival following infection by related species of Orthopoxvirus. In contrast, safety data was available from trials of the drug in treating Cytomegalovirus infections in humans.

Imatinib, a compound approved by the FDA for cancer treatment, has been shown to limit the release of extracellular enveloped virions and to protect mice from a lethal challenge with vaccinia. Currently, imatinib and related compounds are being evaluated by the CDC for their efficacy against variola virus and mpox virus.

== Lab synthesis ==
In the summer of 2017, researchers at the University of Alberta recreated the extinct horsepox virus (HPXV) via lab synthesis to conduct research into using viruses to treat cancer. A commercial gene synthesis service was used to synthesize the horsepox genome in 8 overlapping pieces with a fluorescent tag. Two more pieces of synthesized DNA containing the missing terminal hairpin sequence was then added to the start and end pieces using the version found in vaccinia virus (VACV). The DNA was then introduced int monkey kidney cells already infected by Shope fibroma virus (Leporipoxvirus rabbitfibroma, SFV) to use SFV's replication mechanism to piece together the horsepox genome by homologous recombination. The resulting virions was purified by infecting cells with them and looking for fluorescence; sequencing confirmed no SFV contamination. Unlike the closely related VACV, the recreated HPXV does not cause a lethal infection (or any detectable illness) in mice, and in fact protected them from death by VACV. It has the potential to serve as an alternative source of smallpox vaccine with fewer side effects.
