= Iraqi biological weapons program =

Research and development of biological weapons in Iraq

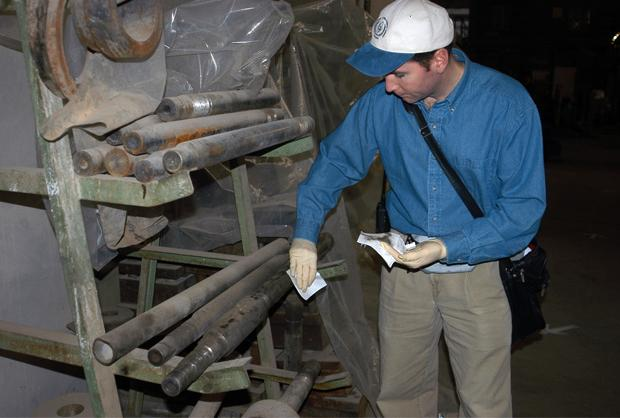
A UN weapons inspector in Iraq in 2002.

Saddam Hussein (1937–2006) began an extensive biological weapons (BW) program in Iraq in the early 1980s, despite having signed (but not ratified until 1991) the Biological Weapons Convention (BWC) of 1972. Details of the BW program and a chemical weapons program surfaced after the Gulf War (1990–91) during the disarmament of Iraq under the United Nations Special Commission (UNSCOM). By the end of the war, program scientists had investigated the BW potential of five bacterial strains, one fungal strain, five types of virus, and four toxins. Of these, three—anthrax, botulinum and aflatoxin—had proceeded to weaponization for deployment. Because of the UN disarmament program that followed the war, more is known today about the once-secret bioweapons program in Iraq than that of any other nation.

The program no longer existed when the George W. Bush administration cited it as justification for its 2003 invasion of Iraq and the subsequent Iraq War.

== The program ==
=== Startup and foreign suppliers ===
In the early 1980s, five German firms supplied equipment to manufacture botulin toxin and mycotoxin to Iraq. Iraq's State Establishment for Pesticide Production (SEPP) also ordered culture media and incubators from Germany's Water Engineering Trading. Strains of dual-use biological material from France also helped advance Iraq's biological warfare program. From the United States, the non-profit American Type Culture Collection and the U.S. Centers for Disease Control sold or sent biological samples to Iraq up until 1989, which Iraq claimed to need for medical research. These materials included anthrax, West Nile virus and botulism, as well as Brucella melitensis, and Clostridium perfringens. Some of these materials were used for Iraq's biological weapons research program, while others were used for vaccine development. In delivering these materials "The CDC was abiding by World Health Organization guidelines that encouraged the free exchange of biological samples among medical researchers..." according to Thomas Monath, CDC lab director. It was a request "which we were obligated to fulfill," as described in WHO and UN treaties.

=== Facilities, agents and production ===
Iraq's BW facilities included its main biowarfare research center at Salman Pak (just south of Baghdad), the main bioweapons production facility at Al Hakum (the "Single-Cell Protein Production Plant") and the viral biowarfare research site at Al Manal (the "Foot and Mouth Disease Center").

The Al Hakum facility began mass production of weapons-grade anthrax in 1989, eventually producing 8,000 liters or more (the 8,000 liter figure is based on declared amounts). Iraq officially acknowledged that it had worked with several species of bacterial pathogen, including Bacillus anthracis, Clostridium botulinum and Clostridium perfringens (gas gangrene) and several viruses (including enterovirus 17 [human conjunctivitis], rotavirus and camelpox). The program also purified biological toxins, such as botulinum toxin, ricin and aflatoxin. After 1995, it was learned that, in all, Iraq had produced 19,000 liters of concentrated botulinum toxin (nearly 10,000 liters filled into munitions), 8,500 liters of concentrated anthrax (6,500 liters filled into munitions) and 2,200 liters of aflatoxin (1,580 liters filled into munitions). In total, the program grew a half million liters of biological agents.

=== Human experimentation ===
During UN inspections in 1998, it emerged that Hussein had prisoners tied to stakes and bombarded with anthrax and chemical weapons for experimental purposes. These experiments began in the 1980s during the Iran–Iraq War after initial experiments on sheep and camels. Dozens of prisoners are believed to have died in agony during the program. According to an article in the London Sunday Times:

In one incident, Iranian prisoners of war are said to have been tied up and killed by bacteria from a shell detonated nearby. Others were exposed to an aerosol of anthrax sprayed into a chamber while doctors watched behind a glass screen. Two British-trained scientists have been identified as leading figures in the programme. … According to Israeli military intelligence sources, 10 Iranian prisoners of war were taken to a location near Iraq's border with Saudi Arabia. They were lashed to posts and left helpless as an anthrax bomb was exploded by remote control 15 yards away. All died painfully from internal haemorrhaging. In another experiment, 15 Kurdish prisoners were tied up in a field while shells containing camel pox, a mild virus, were dropped from a light aircraft. The results were slower but the test was judged a success; the prisoners fell ill within a week. Iraqi sources say some of the cruellest research has been conducted at an underground facility near Salman Pak, southwest of Baghdad. Here, the sources say, experiments with biological and chemical agents were carried out first on dogs and cats, then on Iranian prisoners. The prisoners were secured to a bed in a purpose-built chamber, into which lethal agents, including anthrax, were sprayed from a high-velocity device mounted in the ceiling. Medical researchers viewed the results through fortified glass. Details of the experiments were known only to Saddam and an inner circle of senior government officials and Iraqi scientists educated in the West. … The facility, which is understood to have been built by German engineers in the 1980s, has been at the centre of Iraq's experiments on "human guinea pigs" for more than 10 years, according to Israeli military sources.

=== Bioweaponeers ===
Iraqi scientist Nassir al-Hindawi was described by United Nations inspectors as the "father of Iraq's biological weapons program". Two of the leading researchers in the program studied in Britain. Rihab al-Taha ("Dr. Germ"), educated at the University of East Anglia, was head of Iraq's military research and development institute. Another scientist received a doctorate in molecular biology from the University of Edinburgh. U.S. officials alleged that a third scientist — Huda Salih Mahdi Ammash ("Mrs. Anthrax", "Chemical Sally"), who was trained at the University of Missouri — helped to rebuild Iraq's BW program in the mid-1990s after the Gulf War. Both al-Taha and Ammash were captured by U.S. forces after the 2003 invasion of Iraq, but both were released in 2005 after they were among those an American-Iraqi board found to be no longer security threats. They had no charges filed against them.

== Consequences of the program ==
=== 1991 US response ===
During the Gulf War, US and other intelligence reports had suggested that Iraq was operating a BW program. Coalition troops trained with protective gear and stockpiled the antibiotic ciprofloxacin for use as post-exposure prophylaxis against anthrax. Approximately 150,000 US troops received the U.S. Food and Drug Administration–licensed anthrax vaccine (BioThrax), and 8,000 received a botulinum toxoid vaccine also approved by the FDA as an investigational new drug. Although Iraq had loaded anthrax, botulinum, and aflatoxin bio-agent into missiles and artillery shells in preparing for the war, and although these munitions were deployed to four locations in Iraq, they were never used.

=== Post-war inspections ===
In August 1991, the UN carried out its first inspection of Iraq's BW capabilities in the aftermath of the Gulf War. On 2 August 1991, representatives of the Iraqi government announced to leaders of UNSCOM's "Team 7" that they had conducted research into the offensive use of B. anthracis, botulinum toxins, and Clostridium perfringens toxins. Post-war inspections by UNSCOM, however, were confounded by misinformation and obfuscation. After Iraqi General Hussein Kamel al-Majid defected to Jordan in August 1995, the Iraqi government further disclosed that it had operated a robust BW program at six major sites since the 1980s. It was revealed that the Iraqi program conducted basic research on B. anthracis, rotavirus, camelpox virus, aflatoxin, botulinum toxins, mycotoxins, and an anticrop agent (wheat cover smut). It tested several delivery systems including aerial spray tanks and drone aircraft. The Iraqi government had weaponized 6,000 liters of B. anthracis spores and 12,000 liters of botulinum toxin in aerial bombs, rockets, and missile warheads before the outbreak of war in 1991. These bio-weapons were deployed but never used.

=== Non-use by Saddam ===
After Kamel's defection, it became known that in December 1990 the Iraqis had filled 100 R-400 bombs with botulinum toxin, 50 with anthrax, and 16 with aflatoxin. In addition, 13 Al Hussein (SCUD) warheads were filled with botulinum toxin, 10 with anthrax, and 2 with aflatoxin. These weapons were deployed in January 1991 to four locations for use against Coalition forces.

Why Saddam Hussein did not use these biological weapons in 1991 is unclear, but the presumption has been that he was concerned about provoking massive retaliation. Other plausible factors include the perceived ineffectiveness of the untested delivery and dispersal systems, the probable ineffectiveness of liquid slurries resulting from poor aerosolization, and the potential hazards to the Iraqi troops themselves, as they lacked the protective equipment and training available to Coalition forces.

Several defectors (see Khidir Hamza) have claimed that these weapons were intended only as "weapons of last resort" in case the Coalition stormed the gates of Baghdad. Since this never happened, Saddam found their use unnecessary.

=== 2003 invasion of Iraq ===
The Iraqis claimed to have destroyed their biological arsenal immediately after the 1991 war, but they did not provide confirmatory evidence. A covert military research and development program continued for another four years, with the intent of resuming agent production and weapons manufacture after the end of UN sanctions. Basic infrastructure was preserved, and research on producing dried agent was conducted under the guise of biopesticide production at Al Hakum until its destruction by UNSCOM inspectors in 1996. The same year, operational portions of the facilities at Salman Pak and Al Manal were also supposedly destroyed, either by the Iraqis themselves or under direct UNSCOM supervision. But UNSCOM inspectors never received full cooperation from the Hussein regime and they were finally expelled from Iraq in 1998. International concerns led to renewed inspections in 2002 under UN Security Council Resolution 1441 and these facilities were again targets for the U.S. military during the 2003 invasion of Iraq as potentially still being operational. President Bush cited the non-cooperation with inspectors as a major justification for military action.

The extent of Iraq's BW program between 1998 when UNSCOM left Iraq and the U.S. Coalition invasion in March 2003 remains unknown. Current information indicates the discovery of a clandestine network of biological laboratories operated by the Iraqi Intelligence Service (Mukhabarat), a prison laboratory complex possibly used for human experimentation, an Iraqi scientist's private culture collection with a strain of possible BW interest, and new research activities involving Brucella and Crimean-Congo hemorrhagic fever virus. Despite diligent investigations since 2003, evidence for the existence of additional BW stockpiles in Iraq has not been documented.

=== 2005 Iraq Survey Group report ===
In 2005, the Iraq Survey Group — an international group composed of civilian and military experts — concluded that the Iraqi military BW program had been abandoned during 1995 and 1996 because of fear that discovery of continued activity would result in severe political repercussions including the extension of UN sanctions. However, they concluded, Hussein had perpetuated ambiguity regarding a possible program as a strategic deterrent against Iran. Other conclusions were that the Mukhabarat continued to investigate toxins as tools of assassination, concealed its program from UNSCOM inspectors after the 1991 war, and reportedly conducted lethal human experimentation until 1994. Small-scale covert laboratories were maintained until 2003.

== See also ==
- Iraq and weapons of mass destruction
- Iraqi chemical weapons program
- History of biological warfare
