= Ectromelia virus =

Virus classification
- (unranked): Virus
- Realm: Varidnaviria
- Kingdom: Bamfordvirae
- Phylum: Nucleocytoviricota
- Class: Pokkesviricetes
- Order: Chitovirales
- Family: Poxviridae
- Genus: Orthopoxvirus
- Species: Orthopoxvirus ectromelia

Species of virus

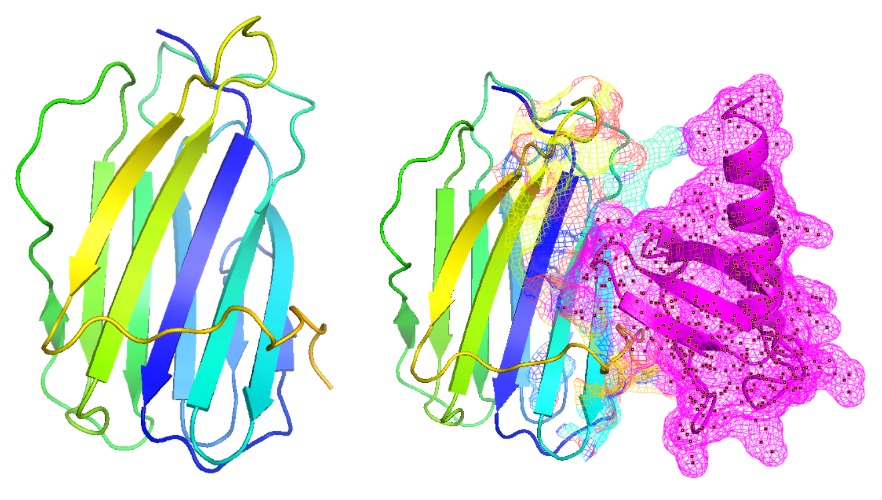
Structure of SECRET protein from Ectromelia virus. The SECRET protein (left) and the SECRET protein bound to CX3CL1 (Right). The chemokine is shown in magenta.

Ectromelia virus (ECTV) is a virus of the family Poxviridae and the genus Orthopoxvirus that causes mousepox, a disease of mice. It has only been seen in mouse colonies kept for research purposes but believed that wild populations of mice and other rodents in Europe are naturally infected with ECTV. Mousepox causes skin lesions, a purulent rash on the body of mice, and generalized disease, which can be fatal. It is the only poxvirus to cause disease naturally in mice.

== History ==
Ectromelia was first discovered in 1930 when scientists started to use mice as a model for examinations and experiments, and was first observed in a colony of laboratory mice in England.

The original Hampstead strain of ECTV was discovered in 1930 in a laboratory-mouse colony. Since then, other ECTV strains and outbreaks have been seen in Europe and the USA with differences in the severity of the disease.

== Properties ==
The Ectromelia virus belongs to the genus Orthopoxvirus of the family Poxviridae. It is a large virus with a complex structure. It has a block shape, with a size of 250-300 150-200 nm. The virus is covered by an outer shell with the villi. The virion contains a two-chain DNA and protein checks. The virus is resistant to ether and phenol, and can be preserved in glycerin. It is temperature-sensitive; even a relatively low temperature (55 °C) inactivates the virus after 30 minutes.

== Value in virology ==
The study of poxviruses is of great interest due to the proteins that they encode to formulate the response of the host, this makes it possible to more deeply study the relationship of the virus-host. The genomic sequence of ECTV in mice allows us to understand the mechanisms of the disease and the interaction of cells and mediators that represent host protection. The similarity of the ECTV genome with the genome of other pox viruses, of which there are 40 genomes of various genera, species and strains of poxviruses, was determined by determining their amino acid or nucleotide sequence. A study of the influence of poxviruses on human and animal health underlines the value of the ECTV mouse model.

== Strain ==
There are several different types of viruses, such as NIH-79, Wash-U, Moscow, Hampstead, St. Louis-69, Beijing-70, and Ishibashi I-III.

ECTV strain Moscow (Mos) - the most virulent, it was isolated by V. Sololiev and first described by Andrewes & Elford.

ECTV strain Naval (Nav) - isolated from an outbreak in a US naval research facility, which manifested as a lethal disease in BALB/c mice and a mild disease with low morbidity and mortality in CD-1 mice.

== Signs and symptoms ==
The severity of the disease and the outcome are determined by factors such as the strain of the virus, the genotype, as well as the dose and route of infection of the virus. Animals of all ages are sensitive to the disease, however, all sensitivities of different mouse lines are different.

Existing resistant strains of mice, such as C57BL/6, C57BL/10 and AKR, may not have clinical signs that viruses can cause for other animals.

The genetic background of the mouse can affect the infection, which means that host factors are involved in the regulation of susceptibility and resistance to the virus. For example, wild mice exhibit variable susceptibility, while laboratory strains were useful for determining host resistance factors.

It is believed that the natural route of infection occurs through abrasions on the skin, which means that the transmission of the virus occurs from animal to animal or through fomites, such as infected bedding in the place for keeping mice.

Infection transmitted alimentary, aerogenic, contact ways.

The disease can occur latent, acute and subacute. Animals with a latent form of the virus do not show any signs of disease. In this case, infection can be activated by various factors, for example, during irradiation, transportation, infection with other pathogens, and experimental load.

With a fulminant form, clinical symptoms do not have time to manifest, and the death of mice occurs unexpectedly and fast. The subacute form represents the classical form of ectromelia: in such cases in animals, mainly on the head, tail and legs develop skin lesions. The skin is edematous, hyperemic, with small focal hemorrhages, which are covered with dry crusts. Subsequently, on the fingers, ears and tail, foci of necrosis are formed, covered with dark brown crusts, which then disappear. Sometimes amputation of limbs or phalanges of the fingers and tail occurs, thus the name ectromelia given to this virus.

== Prevention and treatment ==
To avoid infection of the colony with the ectromelia virus, it is necessary to regularly test the colony and monitor the health of mice. To eradicate the virus in the colony, quarantine must be established and reproduction stopped. Vaccination also helps eliminate the problem of virus infection.

The animal house must be thoroughly cleaned and disinfected, preferably with gaseous formalin or vaporized hydrogen peroxide. Ectromelia virus can survive for 11 days at room temperature in blood. All other animal house materials should be discarded as hazardous waste (incinerated) or autoclaved. Autoclaving, formalin treatment, and common disinfectants will inactivate the ectromelia virus, as will desiccation or detergents.

== Epidemiology ==
The disease has spread throughout the world, but its occurrence is sporadic and rare.

There are several named strains of ectromelia virus that vary in virulence, including NIH-79, Wash-U, Moscow, Hampstead, St. Louis-69, Beijing-70, and Ishibashi I–III.

The mousepox model presents an opportunity to study the components of the immune system that are required for an efficient immunological response to a natural poxvirus infection in a well-understood animal model that can be further manipulated by targeted inactivation or expression of genes.
