= North-methanocarbathymidine =

Chemical compound

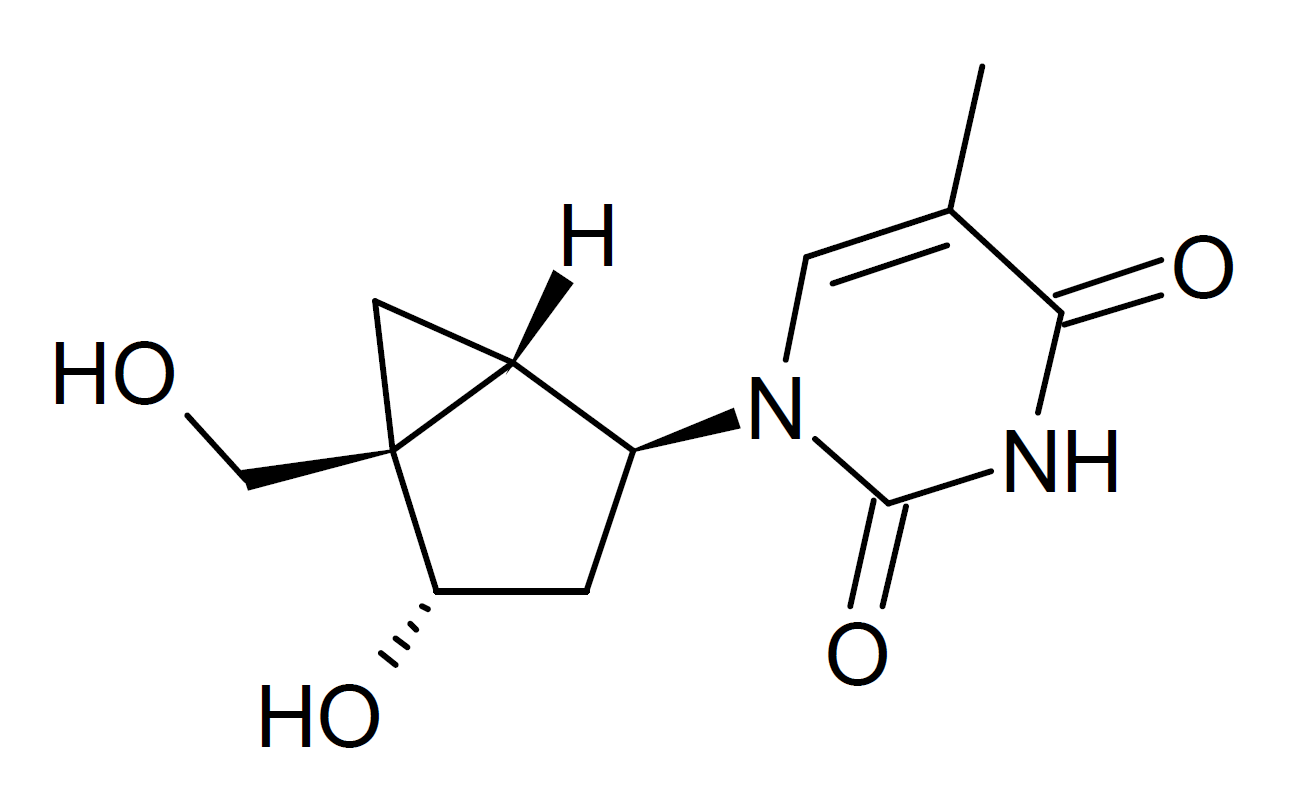

Clinical data
- Trade names: N-MCT

Legal status
- Legal status: US: Investigational drug

Identifiers
- IUPAC name: 1-[(1S,2S,4S,5R)-4-hydroxy-5-(hydroxymethyl)-2-bicyclo[3.1.0]hexanyl]-5-methylpyrimidine-2,4-dione
- CAS Number: 156126-12-4
- PubChem CID: 445212
- UNII: LTM5S02010

Chemical and physical data
- Formula: C_{12}H_{16}N_{2}O_{4}
- Molar mass: 252.270 g·mol^{−1}
- 3D model (JSmol): Interactive image
- SMILES: CC1=CN(C(=O)NC1=O)[C@H]2C[C@@H]([C@]3([C@@H]2C3)CO)O
- InChI: InChI=1S/C12H16N2O4/c1-6-4-14(11(18)13-10(6)17)8-2-9(16)12(5-15)3-7(8)12/h4,7-9,15-16H,2-3,5H2,1H3,(H,13,17,18)/t7-,8+,9+,12+/m1/s1; Key:NOWRLNPOENZFHP-ARHDFHRDSA-N

North-Methanocarbathymidine (N-MCT) is an antiviral drug which is an analogue of thymidine, and shows activity against herpesviruses, orthopoxviruses and HIV, though it has not been introduced into clinical use.
