= Al Hakum (Iraq) =

Iraqi biological weapon production plant

Coordinates: 33°02′42″N 44°03′15″E

Al Hakum, also romanized Al Hakam, was at one time Iraq's most sophisticated and largest biological weapons (BW) production factory. The facility was part of a large military complex at Jurf Al Sakhar (Jur al-Sahkar), about 60–70 kilometers southwest of Baghdad, near al-Musayyib. It produced large quantities of botulinum toxin and anthrax from 1989 to 1996. The name derives from the common Arabic name or title Al Hakam ("The Judge"), one of the Names of God in the Qur'an.

== History ==
In the early 1980s, Iraq (under Saddam Hussein) violated the Biological Weapons Convention (BWC) by establishing extensive programs for the development of both chemical and biological weapons. Detailed confirmation of these programs only surfaced in the wake of the Gulf War (1990–91), following investigations conducted by the United Nations Special Commission (UNSCOM) in charge of the disarmament of Saddam's Iraq. One of several BW facilities in Iraq, the "Single-Cell Protein Production Plant" at Al Hakum was the main bioweapons production facility, built under the cover of an animal feed facility.

The Al Hakum facility began mass production of weapons-grade anthrax in 1989 and ultimately produced 8,000 liters or more. (The 8,000 liter figure is according to a declaration by the Iraqi government itself.) In the aftermath of the Gulf War, Iraq officially acknowledged that it had worked with several species of bacterial pathogen, including Bacillus anthracis, Clostridium botulinum and Clostridium perfringens (which causes gas gangrene) and several viruses (including enterovirus 17 [i.e., human conjunctivitis], rotavirus and camel pox). The program also purified biological toxins, including botulinum toxin, ricin and aflatoxin. In total, a half million liters of biological agents were grown.

Among the products created by Iraqi bioweaponeers at the Al Hakum facility was an anthrax surrogate utilizing Bacillus thuringiensis, which is essentially the anthrax agent affecting insects. B. thuringiensis is often used by gardeners to control grubs, thus the Iraqis at one time also used the cover story that the Al Hakum facility was created to deal with the Iraqi grub problem.

== See also ==
- Iraqi biological weapons program
