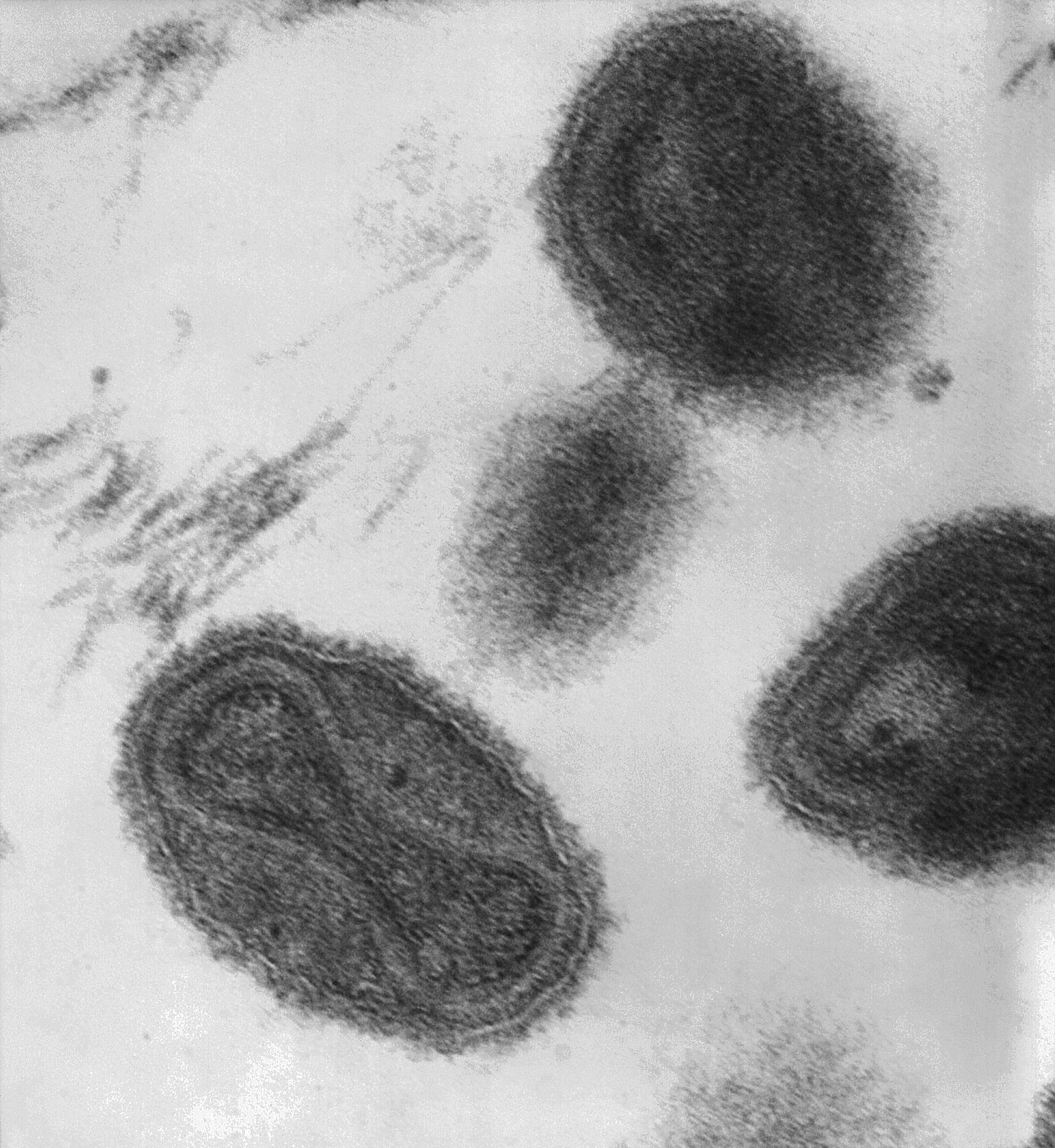
- This transmission electron micrograph depicts a number of smallpox virions. The "dumbbell-shaped" structure inside the virion is the viral core, which contains the viral DNA; Mag.=~370,000×

Virus classification
- (unranked): Virus
- Realm: Varidnaviria
- Kingdom: Bamfordvirae
- Phylum: Nucleocytoviricota
- Class: Pokkesviricetes
- Order: Chitovirales
- Family: Poxviridae
- Genus: Orthopoxvirus
- Species: Orthopoxvirus variola

= Variola virus =

Orthopoxvirus variola

Species of virus

Variola virus is the causative agent of smallpox, a formerly widespread and dangerous disease in humans. The virus is large and brick-shaped and is approximately 330 by 260 nm, with a single linear double-stranded DNA genome 186 kilobase pairs (kbp) in size and containing a hairpin loop at each end. It infects only humans in nature. Both enveloped and unenveloped virions are infectious. Infection with either the major or minor strain confers immunity against the other. Variola major, the more common of the two strains, caused the more clinically severe illness and accounted for the great majority of smallpox's historical mortality. The genome of variola major virus is about 186,000 base pairs in length. It is made from linear double-stranded DNA and contains the coding sequence for about 200 genes. The center of the genome contains the majority of the essential viral genes, including for structural proteins, DNA replication, transcription, and mRNA synthesis. The ends of the genome vary more across strains and species of orthopoxviruses. These regions contain proteins that modulate the hosts' immune systems, and are primarily responsible for the variability in virulence across the orthopoxvirus family. Gene expression occurs entirely within the cytoplasm of the host cell, and follows a distinct progression during infection. About half of the viral genome is transcribed prior to the replication of viral DNA. The first set of expressed genes are transcribed by pre-existing viral machinery packaged within the infecting virion. These genes encode the factors necessary for viral DNA synthesis and for transcription of the next set of expressed genes. DNA replication in variola virus takes place within the cytoplasm of the infected cell. Recombination of the genome occurs within actively infected cells. The products include transcription factors for transcribing genes for new virions, as well as viral RNA polymerase and other essential enzymes for new viral particles. These proteins are packaged into new infectious virions.

== Virus ==
Variola virus is large and brick-shaped and is approximately 302 to 350 nanometers by 244 to 270 nm, with a single linear double stranded DNA genome 186 kilobase pairs (kbp) in size and containing a hairpin loop at each end.

Four orthopoxviruses cause infection in humans: variola, vaccinia, cowpox, and monkeypox. Variola virus infects only humans in nature, although primates and other animals have been infected in an experimental setting. Vaccinia, cowpox, and monkeypox viruses can infect both humans and other animals in nature.

The life cycle of poxviruses is complicated by having multiple infectious forms, with differing mechanisms of cell entry. Poxviruses are unique among human DNA viruses in that they replicate in the cytoplasm of the cell rather than in the nucleus. To replicate, poxviruses produce a variety of specialized proteins not produced by other DNA viruses, the most important of which is a viral-associated DNA-dependent RNA polymerase.

Both enveloped and unenveloped virions are infectious. The viral envelope is made of modified Golgi membranes containing viral-specific polypeptides, including hemagglutinin. Infection with either variola major virus or variola minor virus confers immunity against the other.

== Strains ==
=== Variola major ===
Variola major, the more common of the two strains, caused the more clinically severe illness and accounted for the great majority of smallpox's historical mortality, while variola minor caused comparatively mild disease with a case-fatality rate of 1% or less. Survivors of ordinary smallpox commonly bore permanent scarring, and a minority were left blind.

In the first half of the 20th century, variola major was the primary cause of smallpox outbreaks across Asia and most of Africa. Meanwhile, variola minor was more commonly found in regions of Europe, North America, South America, and certain parts of Africa.

=== Variola minor ===
Variola minor virus, also called alastrim, was a less common form of the virus, and much less deadly. Although variola minor had the same incubation period and pathogenetic stages as smallpox, it is believed to have had a mortality rate of less than 1%, as compared to variola major's 30%. Like variola major, variola minor was spread through inhalation of the virus in the air, which could occur through face-to-face contact or through fomites. Infection with variola minor virus conferred immunity against the more dangerous variola major virus.

Because variola minor was a less debilitating disease than smallpox, people were more frequently ambulant and thus able to infect others more rapidly. As such, variola minor swept through the United States, Great Britain, and South Africa in the early 20th century, becoming the dominant form of the disease in those areas and thus rapidly decreasing mortality rates. Along with variola major, the minor form has now been totally eradicated from the globe. The last case of indigenous variola minor was reported in a Somali cook, Ali Maow Maalin, in October 1977, and smallpox was officially declared eradicated worldwide in May 1980. Variola minor was also called white pox, kaffir pox, Cuban itch, West Indian pox, milk pox, and pseudovariola.

== Genome composition ==
The genome of variola major virus is about 186,000 base pairs in length. It is made from linear double stranded DNA and contains the coding sequence for about 200 genes. The genes are usually not overlapping and typically occur in blocks that point towards the closer terminal region of the genome. The coding sequence of the central region of the genome is highly consistent across orthopoxviruses, and the arrangement of genes is consistent across chordopoxviruses.

The center of the variola virus genome contains the majority of the essential viral genes, including the genes for structural proteins, DNA replication, transcription, and mRNA synthesis. The ends of the genome vary more across strains and species of orthopoxviruses. These regions contain proteins that modulate the hosts' immune systems, and are primarily responsible for the variability in virulence across the orthopoxvirus family. These terminal regions in poxviruses are inverted terminal repetitions (ITR) sequences. These sequences are identical but oppositely oriented on either end of the genome, leading to the genome being a continuous loop of DNA. Components of the ITR sequences include an incompletely base paired A/T rich hairpin loop, a region of roughly 100 base pairs necessary for resolving concatomeric DNA (a stretch of DNA containing multiple copies of the same sequence), a few open reading frames, and short tandemly repeating sequences of varying number and length. The ITRs of poxviridae vary in length across strains and species. The coding sequence for most of the viral proteins in variola major virus have at least 90% similarity with the genome of vaccinia, a related virus used for vaccination against smallpox.

== Gene expression ==
Gene expression of variola virus occurs entirely within the cytoplasm of the host cell, and follows a distinct progression during infection. After entry of an infectious virion into a host cell, synthesis of viral mRNA can be detected within 20 minutes. About half of the viral genome is transcribed prior to the replication of viral DNA. The first set of expressed genes are transcribed by pre-existing viral machinery packaged within the infecting virion. These genes encode the factors necessary for viral DNA synthesis and for transcription of the next set of expressed genes. Unlike most DNA viruses, DNA replication in variola virus and other poxviruses takes place within the cytoplasm of the infected cell. The exact timing of DNA replication after infection of a host cell varies across the poxviridae. Recombination of the genome occurs within actively infected cells. Following the onset of viral DNA replication, an intermediate set of genes codes for transcription factors of late gene expression. The products of the later genes include transcription factors necessary for transcribing the early genes for new virions, as well as viral RNA polymerase and other essential enzymes for new viral particles. These proteins are then packaged into new infectious virions capable of infecting other cells.
