= Salman Pak facility =

Iraqi military facility

The Salman Pak, or al-Salman, facility is an Iraqi military facility near Baghdad. It was assessed by United States military intelligence to be a key center of Iraq's biological and chemical weapons programs. The facility came under American control in early April 2003 when it was captured by U.S. Marines. The facility was then referred to as Forward Operating Base (FOB) Carpenter.

== Background ==
The Salman Pak facility is located approximately 15 miles (24 km) south of Baghdad on a peninsula formed by a broad eastward meander of the Tigris River, near a town also called Salman Pak. The facility grounds comprise approximately 20 square kilometres. According to the Federation of American Scientists, the installation was a key center of Iraq's biological and chemical weapon programs. In 1989 and 1990, the laboratories in the complex researched anthrax, botulinum, clostridium, perfringens, mycotoxins, aflatoxins, and ricin. A special forces training camp at the southernmost point of the shifting land form was also used by the Mukhabarat (Iraqi Intelligence) as the headquarters for its Special Operations [14th] Directorate.

== False claims of connections to terrorism ==
The facility was discussed in the lead-up to the 2003 U.S. invasion of Iraq as a result of a campaign by Iraqi defectors associated with the Iraqi National Congress (INC) to assert that the complex incorporated a purpose-built terrorist training camp; a narrative first promoted by western journalists David Rose and Judith Miller. Internally, both the Central Intelligence Agency (CIA) and the Defense Intelligence Agency (DIA) concluded that there was no evidence to support these claims. A DIA analyst told the Senate Select Committee on Intelligence that the INC "has been pushing information for a long time about Salman Pak and training of al-Qa'ida." Reporters Jonathan Landay and Warren Strobel noted in November 2005 that "After the war, U.S. officials determined that a facility in Salman Pak was used to train Iraqi anti-terrorist commandos."

Iraqi defectors associated with the INC said that the camp was used by the Mukhabarat to train Iraqi militia groups such as the Fedayeen in use of military small arms, RPGs, assassination, espionage, and counterinsurgency techniques. Shortly after the September 11, 2001 attacks, members of the INC asserted that the facility was used to train the hijackers involved. Sabah Khodada, a former captain in the Iraqi Army, claimed that the attacks had been carried out by people who had been trained in Iraq. In a PBS Frontline special on US television, a man identified only "an Iraqi Lieutenant General", claimed that in 2000 he had been "the security officer in charge of the unit" at Salman Pak and had seen Arab students being taught how to hijack airliners using a Boeing 707 fuselage at Salman Pak. The independent Iraqi weekly Al-Yawm Al-Aakher interviewed a former Iraqi officer who also claimed that Salman Pak was being used to train foreign terrorists.

Seymour Hersh notes that "Salman Pak was overrun by American troops on April 6. Apparently, neither the camp nor the former biological facility has yielded evidence to substantiate the claims made before the war." A mass grave containing 150 bodies was found in June 2003. The bodies were apparently executed prisoners who were killed three days before US troops entered Baghdad in April 2003. Douglas MacCollam wrote in the July/August 2004 issue of the Columbia Journalism Review that "There still remain claims and counterclaims about what was going on at Salman Pak. But the consensus view now is that the camp was what Iraq told UN weapons inspectors it was — a counterterrorism training camp for army commandos."

== Credibility of defectors ==
Inconsistencies in the stories of the defectors led some U.S. officials, journalists, and investigators to conclude that the Salman Pak story was inaccurate. One senior U.S. official said that they had found "nothing to substantiate" the claim that al-Qaeda trained at Salman Pak. The credibility of the defectors has been questioned due to their association with the Iraqi National Congress, an organization that has been accused of deliberately supplying false information to the US government in order to build support for an invasion of Iraq. "The INC's agenda was to get us into a war", said Helen Kennedy of the New York Daily News.

The DIA told the Senate Select Committee on Intelligence in 2006 that after Operation Desert Storm, "fabricators and unestablished sources who reported hearsay or thirdhand information created a large volume of human intelligence reporting. This type of reporting surged after September 2001 and continued well after the capture of Salman Pak." Yet the DIA's postwar exploitation of the facility found "no information from Salman Pak that links al-Qa'ida with the former regime." (p. 84)

=== Sabah Khodada ===
One of the sources for the claims of terrorist training at Salman Pak was Iraqi defector Sabah Khodada, a former captain in the Iraqi Republican Guard. Khodada was interviewed by PBS's Frontline, reporting that he had witnessed foreign fighters training to hijack airplanes. Khodada reported, "They would be trained on assassinations, kidnapping, hijacking of airplanes, hijacking of buses, public buses, hijacking of trains and all other kinds of operations related to terrorism." He further stated, "Non-Iraqis were trained separately from us. There were strict orders not to meet with them and not to talk to them. ... They look like they're mostly from the Gulf, sometimes from areas close to Yemen, from their dark skin and short bodies. And they also are Muslims." The Executive Editor of Frontline, Louis Wiley Jr., later acknowledged that its reporting on Salman Pak was inaccurate, but defended the report: "Your readers should know that checking inside Saddam's Iraq at the time of the broadcast on the bona fides of Iraqis who had fled the country was virtually impossible. FRONTLINE did its best to vet the interviews with American officials and hired our own translators. In the broadcast we noted that these two defectors had come to us through the INC, a group whose bias we identified. We quoted an American official who cast doubt on the defectors' claims: 'It is unlikely the training on the 707 is linked to the hijackings of September 11.' We also interviewed the Iraqi Ambassador to the U.N., who told us: 'I know the area, this Salman Pak. . . . It is not possible to do such a program there, because there's no place for planes, for airplanes there.'... The Salman Pak story is a cautionary tale for all of us who are committed to tough investigative reporting." In November 2005, the Editor added the following note to the report on Khodada:

More than two years after the U.S.-led invasion of Iraq, there has been no verification of Khodada's account of the activities at Salman Pak. In fact, U.S. officials have now concluded that Salman Pak was most likely used to train Iraqi counter-terrorism units in anti-hijacking techniques. He and other defectors interviewed for this report were brought to FRONTLINE's attention by the Iraqi National Congress (INC), a dissident organization that was working to overthrow Saddam Hussein. Since the original broadcast, Khodada has not publicly addressed questions that have been raised about his account of activities at Salman Pak.

=== Abu Zeinab al-Ghurairy ===
Another key source for the claims was Iraqi defector "Abu Zeinab" al-Ghurairy. A man claiming to be al-Ghurairy gave interviews to the New York Times and Frontline, claiming (like Khodada) that he had witnessed foreign fighters training to hijack airplanes. Ghurairy told the New York Times "We were training these people to attack installations important to the United States. The Gulf War never ended for Saddam Hussein. He is at war with the United States." In 2006, however, Jack Fairweather reported in Mother Jones that "the Ghurairy who met with the Times and PBS was actually a former Iraqi sergeant, then living in Turkey and known by the code name Abu Zainab. The real Lt. General Ghurairy, it seems, had never left Iraq." Fairweather tracked down Ghurairy in Iraq:

During the 20-minute interview, in which he grew increasingly angry and suspicious, Ghurairy said he had been the commandant of the Suwara military base from 1993 to 2000 and had never worked at the Salman Pak military facility. He also said he had never spoken to U.S. intelligence agents or Western journalists: "I have never met these people. I have not left Iraq," Ghurairy told Mother Jones, adding that he had not been aware that a man claiming to be him had been quoted in U.S. newspapers and on television...."I have never met these people!" he repeated with considerable agitation. "I have not left Iraq. The people who say this were trying to use my name to make war!"

== True purpose of the camp ==
=== Special Operations Forces ===
Former UN inspector Scott Ritter believes that based on his experience with the facility, it was constructed primarily for counter terrorism training and later to train Iraqi special forces to fight the Islamic Kurdish party. He wrote:

Iraqi defectors have been talking lately about the training camp at Salman Pak, south of Baghdad. They say there's a Boeing aircraft there. That's not true. There's an Antonov aircraft of Russian manufacture. They say there are railroad mock-ups, bus mock-ups, buildings, and so on. These are all things you'd find in a hostage rescue training camp, which is what this camp was when it was built in the mid-1980s with British intelligence supervision. In fact, British SAS special operations forces were sent to help train the Iraqis in hostage rescue techniques. Any nation with a national airline and that is under attack from terrorists — and Iraq was, from Iran and Syria at the time — would need this capability. Iraq operated Salman Pak as a hostage rescue training facility up until 1992. In 1992, because Iraq no longer had a functioning airline, and because their railroad system was inoperative, Iraq turned the facility over to the Iraqi Intelligence service, particularly the Department of External Threats. These are documented facts coming out of multiple sources from a variety of different countries. The Department of External Threats was created to deal with Kurdistan, in particular, the infusion of Islamic fundamentalist elements from Iran into Kurdistan. So, rather than being a camp dedicated to train Islamic fundamentalist terrorists, it was a camp dedicated to train Iraq to deal with Islamic fundamentalist terrorists. And they did so. Their number one target was the Islamic Kurdish party, which later grew into Al Ansar. ... Ansar comes out of Iran and is supported by Iranians. Iraq, as part of their ongoing war against Islamic fundamentalism, created a unit specifically designed to destroy these people.

Similarly, Seymour Hersh notes that "Salman Pak was overrun by American troops on April 6. Apparently, neither the camp nor the former biological facility has yielded evidence to substantiate the claims made before the war."

[A] former C.I.A. station chief and a former military intelligence analyst said that the camp near Salman Pak had been built not for terrorism training but for counter-terrorism training. In the mid-eighties, Islamic terrorists were routinely hijacking aircraft. In 1986, an Iraqi airliner was seized by pro-Iranian extremists and crashed, after a hand grenade was triggered, killing at least sixty- five people. ... Iraq then sought assistance from the West, and got what it wanted from Britain's MI6.

Writing under the penname Gayle Rivers, former Special Air Service (SAS) reservist Raymond Brooks described his experiences of training Iraqi commandos on the oxbow island during the early 1980s.

The Special Forces base in the Tigris grouped together some of the best trained and motivated officers and men that Iraq possessed. ... The current in the Tigris is extremely fast there... The main part of the island [has] training camps everywhere, with assault courses, ranges and roofless buildings for teaching assault techniques. There is also one tall structure which is used for teaching abseiling or rappelling, for use in attacking from a rope descent.

Jack Fairweather reported senior Iraqi military officers having indicated that the facility was used both for counter terrorism operations and, later, the training of foreign fighters: "while Iraq's special forces did train to retake hijacked airplanes at the Salman Pak facility, such training was routine for any elite combat unit. Foreign fighters were housed with the Fedayeen Saddam—whose main headquarters were at the Suwara facility—but only in the run-up to the 2003 invasion of Iraq, not back in 2001."

=== Iraq Survey Group ===
On September 30, 2004, Charles Duelfer released his findings of the Special Advisor to the Director of Central Intelligence on Iraq's Weapons of Mass Destruction. In a section of the report titled "Regime Strategic Intent Annex B", the report states the following:

M14, Directorate of Special Operations: M14, directed by Muhammad Khudayr Sabah Al Dulaymi, was responsible for training and conducting special operations missions. It trained Iraqis, Palestinians, Syrians, Yemeni, Lebanese, Egyptian, and Sudanese operatives in counterterrorism, explosives, marksmanship, and foreign operations at its facilities at Salman Pak. Additionally, M14 oversaw the 'Challenge Project,' a highly secretive project regarding explosives. Sources to date have not been able to provide sufficient details regarding the 'Challenge Project.'

Structure of M14: Special Operations Department, composed of a foreign and a domestic section, performed government-sanctioned assassinations inside or outside of Iraq.

The 'Tiger Group' was similar to Special Operations, except that it was primarily suicide bombers.

The Training Department provided training for all IIS officers going abroad.

The Counterterrorism Department handled counterterrorism activities in Iraq and at embassies; reportedly, it disarmed terrorists hijacking a Sudanese airliner from Saddam International Airport.

The Administrative Department provided support services such as administration, finances, communications, and logistics.

The Anti-Iranian Department infiltrated operatives into Iran for intelligence collection and operated against Iranian groups attempting to enter Iraq.

Duelfer's report also suggests that Salman Pak may have been used by Saddam to train loyalists and foreign fighters for the planned Iraq insurgency.

=== United States Senate Select Committee on Intelligence ===
On September 8, 2006, "Phase II" of the Senate Report of Pre-war Intelligence on Iraq was released. On page 83 of the report, the following is stated under the heading "Postwar Information on Salman Pak":

In a response to questions from Committee staff asking if DIA recovered or received information or intelligence, after the raid on Salman Pak in April 2003 that indicated non-Iraqis received terrorist training at the Salman Pak facility, DIA said it has "no credible reports that non-Iraqis were trained to conduct or support transnational terrorist operations at Salman Pak after 1991." DIA assessed that the foreigners were likely volunteers who traveled to Iraq in the months before Operation Iraqi Freedom began to fight overtly alongside Iraqi military forces...DIA said it has "no information from Salman Pak that links al-Qa'ida with the former regime."

In June 2006, CIA told the Committee that: There was information developed after OIF (Operation Iraqi Freedom) that indicated terrorists were trained at Salman Pak; there was an apparent surge of such reporting. As with past information, however, the reporting is vague and difficult to substantiate. As was the case with the prewar reporting, the postwar sources provided few details, and it is difficult to conclude from their second-hand accounts whether Iraq was training al-Qa'ida members, as opposed to other foreign nationals. Postwar exploitation of Salman Pak has yielded no indications that training of al-Qa'ida linked individuals took place there, and we have no information from detainees on this issue

A November 2003 assessment from DIA noted that postwar exploitation of the facility found it "devoid of valuable intelligence." The assessment added that CIA exploitation "found nothing of intelligence value remained and assessed that Iraqi Intelligence Service (IIS) cleaned it out." The DIA assessment concluded that "we do not know whether [the] ex-regime trained terrorists on the aircraft at Salman Pak". Intelligence in late April 2003 indicated the plane had been dismantled and sold for scrap.

The Senate Select Committee on Intelligence concluded that "Postwar findings support the April 2002 Defense Intelligence Agency (DIA) assessment that there was no credible reporting on al-Qa'ida training at Salman Pak or anywhere else in Iraq. There have been no credible reports since the war that Iraq trained al-Qa'ida operatives at Salman Pak to conduct or support transnational terrorist operations." The CIA and DIA both told the Committee that their postwar exploration of the facility "has yielded no indications that training of al-Qa'ida linked individuals took place there. In June 2006, the DIA told the Committee that it has 'no credible reports that non-Iraqis were trained to conduct or support transnational terrorist operations at Salman Pak after 1991."
