= Borealpox virus =

Virus classification
- (unranked): Virus
- Realm: Varidnaviria
- Kingdom: Bamfordvirae
- Phylum: Nucleocytoviricota
- Class: Pokkesviricetes
- Order: Chitovirales
- Family: Poxviridae
- Genus: Orthopoxvirus
- Virus: Borealpox virus

Species of virus

Borealpox virus (BRPV) (formerly Alaskapox virus; AKPV) is a species of the Orthopoxvirus genus first documented in 2015 in Alaska, United States. As of February 2024, there are seven reported cases of illness, one of which became fatal due to a weakened immune system. The first six cases occurred in Fairbanks North Star Borough and the first fatality occurred in Kenai Peninsula Borough.

== Discovery ==
In July 2015, a woman visited a clinic in Fairbanks, Alaska, with lesions that were confirmed to contain an orthopoxvirus but did not match any known members of the genus. Subsequent genetic analysis established that the woman, who recovered, had been infected with a novel orthopoxvirus. The name Alaskapox virus was proposed after a full analysis of its genome was published in 2019. The name Alaskapox virus was changed to borealpox virus on March 27, 2024.

== Subsequent cases ==
In 2020, the Alaska Department of Health and Social Services (ADHSS) announced the second known infection of AKPV in another Fairbanks woman. Two additional cases were identified in the Fairbanks area in the summer of 2021, and by February 2024, seven cases total had been reported to the Alaska Section of Epidemiology. Until December 2023, all known cases had been mild, not requiring hospitalization.

In late January 2024, a Kenai man with an immunocompromising condition diagnosed with AKPV died, becoming the first death and first reported case outside of the Fairbanks North Star Borough. The patient had stated that a stray cat had scratched him near the site the lesion appeared and that he sought medical attention due to a tender red bump in his armpit in September 2023. Despite some sources claiming that the man died directly as a result of AKPV, his death has instead been attributed to kidney failure, although it has been said that there may have been some connection between his immunocompromised status and the lesion on his arm that resulted in his death.

== Signs and symptoms ==
In the identified cases, AKPV causes small lesions on the skin that heal after a few weeks, according to the ADHSS, but the first known patient indicated the lesion took six months to fully resolve. Other reported symptoms include joint or muscle pain and swollen lymph nodes.

== Transmission ==
Transmission of the virus to humans is hypothesized to be via small animals, though it is not yet clear specifically how this occurs. As of 2021, there was not established evidence of transmission among humans.
