= Lateral body =

Lateral bodies are structures that sit on the concave sides of the viral core of a poxvirus and is surrounded by a membrane. They serve as immunomodulatory delivery packets, and membrane cloaking to spread poxviruses. They were first visualized using electron microscopy in 1956 and shortly after, it was shown that they detach from the viral core upon membrane fusion.

== Lateral body proteins ==
Lateral bodies are made up of at least three proteins, phosphoprotein F17, dual-specificity phosphatase H1 and the viral oxidoreductase G4. F17 is the main structural protein and may play a role in modulating cellular immune response through MAPK signaling pathways. H1 dephosphorylates STAT1 to prevent nuclear transcription and block IFNy-induced immune signaling. Finally, G4 is essential for viral morphogenesis. Additionally, the proteins packed in lateral bodies are redox proteins, which modulates the host oxidative response impacting early gene expression and virion production.
