= Postvaccinal encephalitis =

Complication of smallpox vaccines

Postvaccinal encephalitis (PVE) is a rare complication which was associated with vaccination with vaccinia virus during the worldwide smallpox eradication campaign. With mortality ranging between 25 – 30% it is the most severe adverse event associated with this vaccination. The mechanism of how it happens is unknown.

== Symptoms and signs ==
PVE symptoms start to appear between 8th and 14th day after vaccination. Amongst the first are fever, headache, confusion and nausea. With passing time lethargy, seizures, short and long term memory dysfunctions, localized paralysis, hemiplegia, polyneuritis and convulsions. In extreme cases PVE can lead to coma and death.

== Histology ==
Inflammatory extra-adventitial lesions are found not only in the brain but in the spinal cord as well. Lesions might be uniform in acute phase or disseminated in subacute phase. Unlike in cases of encephalitis lethargica the main damage is found in white brain matter. Meninges are infiltrated with T cells, plasmatic cells and phagocytic cells. Polymorfonuclear cells were found only in severe lesions. Apart from cellular infiltrate in perivascular space there is a tissue rarefication in spaces close to damaged blood vessels. Accumulated small nuclei are found in places of such rarefication. Strong demyelination with rapid clearance of degraded myelin is also observed in cases of PVE. Tissue damage leads to necrosis in the end.

== Treatment ==
Vaccinia immunoglobulin was given to patients with PVE. But some significant effects of this treatment were observed only if given before PVE developed. That is why only supportive treatment was given to patients with PVE to attenuate symptoms.

== Incidence ==
Vaccination with vaccinia virus was accompanied with a spectrum of adverse events. Some of them lethal. Generally accepted number of deaths after vaccination with live vaccine is one per one million vaccinations. But during the eradication campaign, more than one vaccination strain was used and these strains differed significantly in causing adverse events.

The incidence of PVE was between 44.9 cases per one million vaccinations with Bern strain used in western Europe to 2.9 cases per one million vaccinations with NYCBH strain used in the US. Number of deaths directly connected to PVE also differed from strain to strain. With 11 deaths per one million vaccinations with the Bern strain to 1.2 deaths per one million vaccinations with the NYCBH strain. PVE incidence also depended on the age of the vaccinated person. That is why in the US children up to one year of age and in Europe children up to three years of age were excluded from vaccination.

== History ==
Complications with the central neural system after smallpox vaccination were observed for the first time right after the vaccination begun. The first diagnosed case of PVE was in 1905.

In times of the smallpox eradication campaign, when PVE was a serious problem, there were no tools for identification of the immune mechanism behind PVE available. Considering the fact that modern smallpox vaccines are much safer and only chosen personnel are vaccinated, PVE is no longer in the centre of attention. Nevertheless, for its similarity with acute disseminated encephalomyelitis (ADEM), which is also postvaccinal adverse reaction (observed for example after anti hepatitis A or B virus vaccination), PVE is considered to be of autoimmune nature. There is no final proof of PVE being caused directly by vaccine virus replication in neural tissues.
