= Pokkesviricetes =

Virus classification
- (unranked): Virus
- Realm: Varidnaviria
- Kingdom: Bamfordvirae
- Phylum: Nucleocytoviricota
- Class: Pokkesviricetes

Orders
- See text

Class of viruses

Pokkesviricetes is a class of viruses.

== Nomenclature ==
The class, Pokkesviricetes, is derived from pockes, the Middle English word for pox as in referring to the disease associated to certain members of Poxviridae.

== Orders ==
The following orders are recognized:

- Asfuvirales
- Chitovirales
