= Permissiveness =

Permissiveness may refer to:

- Permissiveness (endocrinology), between hormones and cells.
- Permissiveness (virology), between viruses and cells.

Permissive may refer to:

- Permissive society, a liberalization of social norms in a society.
- Permissive software license, a free-software license.
- Permissive cell or permissive host, a cell which allows a virus to circumvent its defenses and replicate.
- Permissive mood, a grammatical mood found in some languages.
- Permissive (film), a 1970 British exploitation drama film.
