= Paul-Félix Armand-Delille =

French physician and bacteriologist

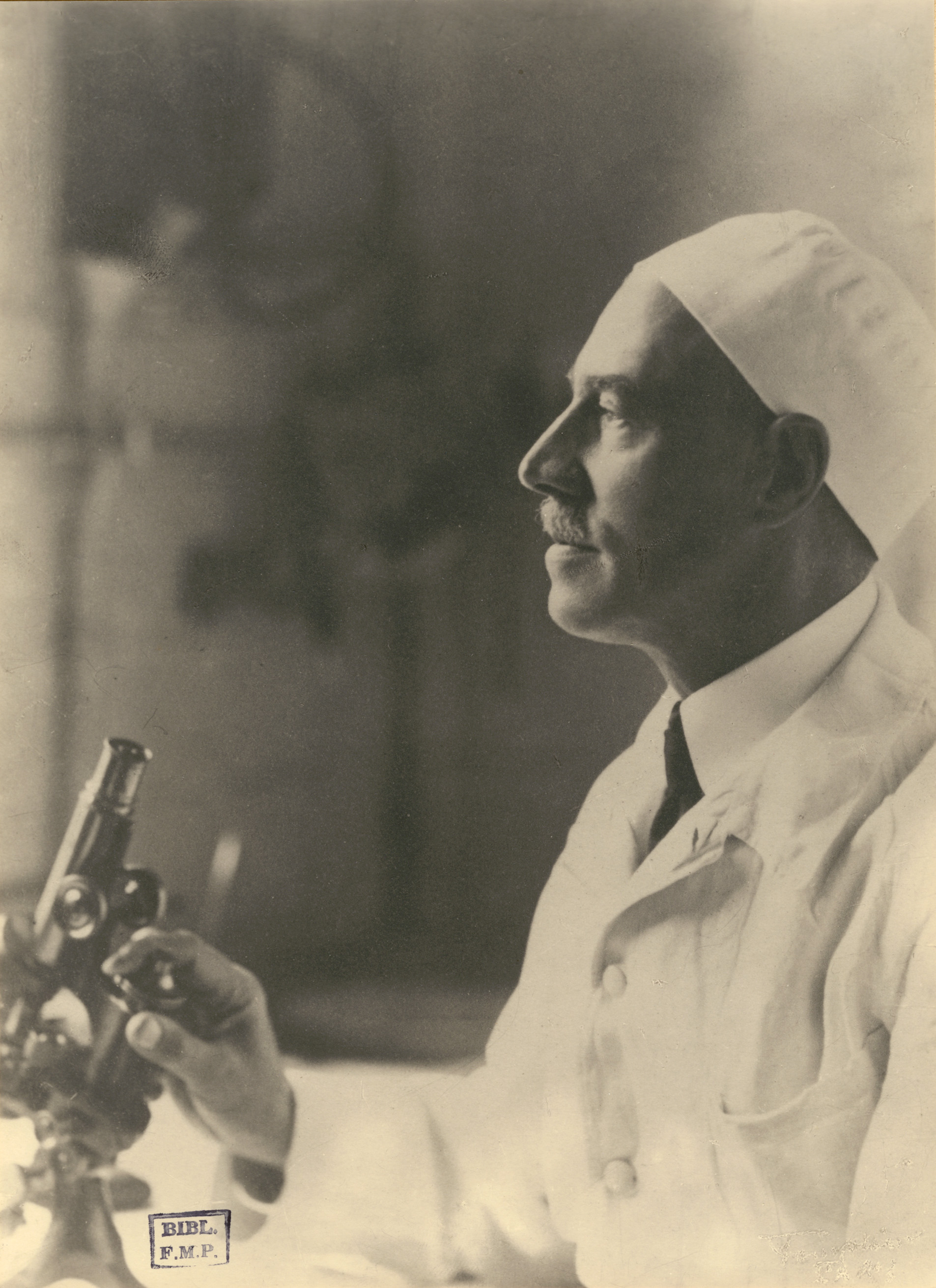
- Born: 3 July 1874; Fourchambault, Nièvre, France
- Died: 4 September 1963 (aged 89)
- Known for: plague of myxomatosis that caused the collapse of European Rabbit populations
- Awards: Commander of the Legion of Honour; Fabien Prize

Academic work
- Discipline: medicine bacteriology
- Main interests: infectious diseases in children malaria
- Notable works: Treatise on Social Service

Paul-Félix Armand-Delille (3 July 1874 – 4 September 1963) was a French physician, bacteriologist, professor, and member of the French Academy of Medicine. He is best known for attempting to protect his crop from rabbits by releasing a pair of rabbits infected with Myxoma virus on to his farm in northern France. The spread of the vira lead to a plague of myxomatosis that caused the collapse of rabbit populations throughout much of Europe and beyond in the 1950s.

== Biography ==
Born in Fourchambault, Nièvre, in central France, Armand-Delille studied medicine and became a professor at the Paris School of Medicine, specialising in infectious diseases in children. During the First World War he carried out important work on malaria, for which he was made a Commander of the Legion of Honour.

Winner of the Fabien Prize in 1943 for his Treatise on Social Service written in 1939, he was then elected a member of the National Academy of Medicine in 1944, where he later retired from the study of medicine.

== Myxomatosis release ==
During his retirement, after having read of the effectiveness of the myxomatosis virus in dealing with rabbit plagues in Australia, in 1952 Armand-Delille decided to intentionally introduce the virus onto his 3-square-kilometre (740-acre) private estate of Chateau Maillebois in Eure-et-Loir, not far from Paris. He used a strain of the virus, which had been isolated in 1949 and believed that the enclosed nature of the estate would prevent its spread into other rabbit populations. Inoculating two rabbits with Myxoma virus acquired from a laboratory in Lausanne, Armand-Delille succeeded in rapidly eradicating the population on his estate and town, with 98% of the rabbits being dead within six weeks. However, within four months it became clear that the virus had escaped from his estate, the corpse of an infected rabbit having been found 50 km (30 miles) away.

Within a year of the initial release, an estimated 45% of the wild rabbits in France had died of the disease, along with 35% of domestic rabbits, and the disease subsequently spread to the rest of western Europe, destroying rabbit populations in the Netherlands, Belgium, Italy, Spain, Germany, Britain, and beyond. The effect on the rabbit population of France was dramatic. In the hunting season covering the year of the release of the virus, 1952–1953, the total number of rabbits killed in 25 hunts exceeded 55 million; the figure for 1956–1957 was just 1.3 million, a 98% reduction.

Armand-Delille found himself both condemned by rabbit hunters and showered with praise by farmers and foresters. He was prosecuted, and in January 1955 he was convicted and fined 5,000 francs. However, he was later honored; in June 1956 he was awarded a gold medal to commemorate his achievement by Bernard Dufay, honorary director-general of the French Department of Rivers and Forests. The medal depicts Armand-Delille on one side, and a dead rabbit on the other.

The disease has in turn affected predators dependent on rabbits as a food source, in particular the Iberian lynx, a rabbit specialist which is unable to significantly adapt its diet. It is not uncommon for shooters to specifically target infected rabbits, viewing the act as being merciful. However, in 2005 the UK Land Registry conducted a survey of 16,000 hectares (62 sq mi) of its land and reported that the rabbit population had increased three-fold every two years, likely a product of increasing genetic resistance to the virus.

== Bibliography ==
- The Private Life of the Rabbit by R. M. Lockley (Andre Deutsch, London 1964)
- International Herald Tribune, Wednesday, June 7, 2006, page 2.
