= Viral life cycle =

Set of processes all viruses follow to ensure survival

Viruses are only able to replicate themselves by commandeering the reproductive apparatus of cells and making them reproduce the virus's genetic structure and particles instead. How viruses do this depends mainly on the type of nucleic acid DNA or RNA they contain, which is either one or the other but never both. Viruses cannot function or reproduce outside a cell, and are totally dependent on a host cell to survive. Most viruses are species specific, and related viruses typically only infect a narrow range of plants, animals, bacteria, or fungi.

== Life cycle process ==
=== Viral entry ===
For the virus to reproduce and thereby establish infection, it must enter cells of the host organism and use those cells' materials. To enter the cells, proteins on the surface of the virus interact with proteins of the cell. Attachment, or adsorption, occurs between the viral particle and the host cell membrane. A hole forms in the cell membrane, then the virus particle or its genetic contents are released into the host cell, where replication of the viral genome may commence.

=== Viral replication ===
Next, a virus must take control of the host cell's replication mechanisms. It is at this stage a distinction between susceptibility and permissibility of a host cell is made. Permissibility determines the outcome of the infection. After control is established and the environment is set for the virus to begin making copies of itself, replication occurs quickly by the millions.

=== Viral shedding ===
After a virus has made many copies of itself, the progeny may begin to leave the cell by several methods. This is called shedding and is the final stage in the viral life cycle.

=== Viral latency ===
Some viruses can "hide" within a cell, which may mean that they evade the host cell defenses or immune system and may increase the long-term "success" of the virus. This hiding is deemed latency. During this time, the virus does not produce any progeny, it remains inactive until external stimuli—such as light or stress—prompts it to activate.

== See also ==
- Kinetic class (virology)
- Viral phenomena, which get their name from the way in which their propagation is analogous to the propagation of viruses among hosts
