= San José Island kangaroo rat =

Conservation status
- Critically Endangered (IUCN 3.1)

Scientific classification
- Kingdom: Animalia
- Phylum: Chordata
- Class: Mammalia
- Order: Rodentia
- Family: Heteromyidae
- Genus: Dipodomys
- Species: D. merriami
- Subspecies: D. m. insularis

Trinomial name
- Dipodomys merriami insularis Merriam, 1907

Subspecies of rodent

The San José Island kangaroo rat (Dipodomys merriami insularis) is a subspecies of rodent in the family Heteromyidae. It is endemic to Mexico, where it is found only on San José Island off the east coast of Baja California Sur. (Dipodomys merriami insularis) is restricted to an area of only 30 km2 in the southwestern coast of San José Island, Lower California, with the population having been drastically reduced in size and being close to extinction No other species of Dipodomys occur in sympatry with D. insularis.

== General characteristics ==
Dipodomys insularis is among the smallest of the kangaroo rats. Compared to other Dipodomys merriami, Dipodomys insularis has larger ears, a grayer coloration, and a more robust appearance. It has a lower bullar index and a lower cranial index of any of the Dipodomys merriami sub-species. D. insularis also differs from its closest geographic relatives D. m. brunensis and D. m. melanurus by being larger in most respects, by being paler in coloration, and having considerably larger ears. This nocturnal Kangaroo Rat is a granivore, feeding on seeds and shrubs.

== Habitat ==
Its natural habitat is hot deserts. It is threatened by habitat degradation by feral goats, and predation by feral cats. Adults are solitary and each maintain their own personal burrow.

Its micro-habitat includes areas of low vegetation cover and small-grain soil. The Dipodomys insularis will not inhabit areas where the soil is smooth, such as areas near riverbeds, or if vegetation cover is too low.

=== Burrows ===
San José Island Kangaroo Rats utilize burrows for food storage, protection from the sun and predators, breeding, and shelter. Dipodomys insularis creates burrows that are tunnels networked together with one or more entrance points. They each use 1 or 2 burrows and no more than 2 rodents inhabit each burrow. Burrows containing the opposite sex are usually found closer in distance than those that contain D. insularis of same sex. Most often, during breeding season, a male and female share a burrow. After giving birth the females were found sharing their burrows with their offspring as well. Adult San José Island Kangaroo Rats seem less prone to sharing burrows than do subadults, unless it is with the opposite sex during mating season.

== Ontogeny and reproduction ==
The American Society of Mammalogists estimates that young may be born in late February or March based on samples collected, however nothing is known about the ontogeny of D. insularis. The breeding season is from December to August with a gestational period of 32 days. The infants are born without fully developed teeth but a developed body with the eyes opening 10 to 11 days from their birth. There have been studies conducted on the mating strategies for these animals. It has been found that D.insulais males have a larger home ranges that can overlap with the home ranges of other males. On the other hand, females have smaller home ranges that don't overlap, showing the strategy of mating and breeding in an area with little resources. This a pattern found in mammals that have limited resources and are then required to expand their territory.

== Conservation ==
A group of researchers led by Sergio Ticul Álvarez-Castañeda and Alfredo Ortega-Rubio have gone onto San José Island to try and collect samples of the Dipodomys insularis. But since 1993, and after planting at times over 4000 traps, there has been very little success. In an area of many mountains without flat areas, there may not be a suitable habitat for the species. However, Álvarez-Castañeda and Ortega-Rubio believe that a small colony may exist on the northern side of the island, where they have not surveyed yet. Dipodomys insularis is found in a protected area and is protected under Mexican law, with the status of in danger of extinction, "en peligro de extinción".

Dipodomys insularis is listed as critically endangered on the IUCN's Red List. This is due to the shrinking, limited range of the mammal's habitat, steady decline in population of adult D. insularis, and steady degradation of their habitat. San José Island, like all islands found in the Gulf of California, is part of a biosphere reserve known as the "Islands of the Sea of Cortez". The small ratio between size of the island and body size of the endangered rodent species is believed to be a cause of endangerment. Human activities have brought in many non-native species, of goats and cats specifically, which pose a great threat to the Dipodomys insularis. These islands have rules and regulations established which protect many endangered species that are endemic to these areas, including Dipodomys insularis. The only activities permitted are believed to have very little ecological impact. Lack of disturbance possibly will assist in preserving the island along with its endemic plant and animal species.
