= Odostomia navarettei =

Scientific classification
- Kingdom: Animalia
- Phylum: Mollusca
- Class: Gastropoda
- Family: Pyramidellidae
- Genus: Odostomia
- Species: O. navarettei

Binomial name
- Odostomia navarettei Baker, Hanna & Strong, 1928

Species of gastropod

Odostomia navarettei is a species of sea snail, a marine gastropod mollusc in the family Pyramidellidae, the pyrams and their allies.

== Distribution ==
This species occurs in the Pacific Ocean off San José Island, Gulf of California.
