= Maillebois =

- Commune
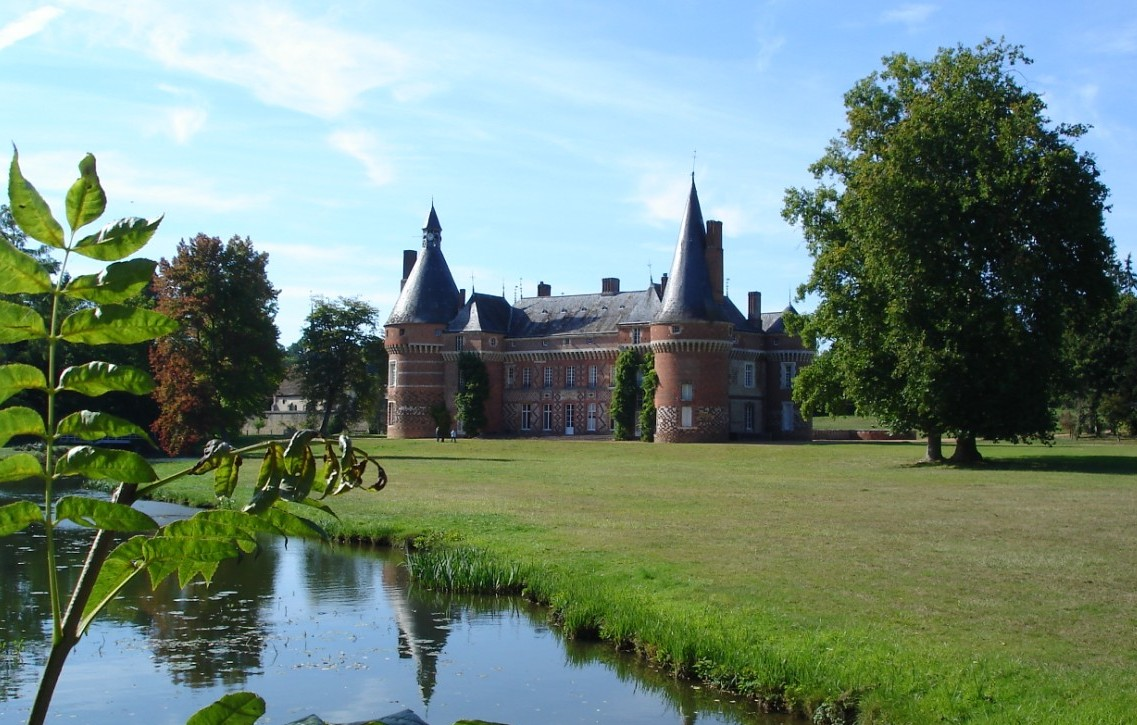
- The chateau in Maillebois

- Coat of arms
- Location of Maillebois
- Location within France Location within Centre-Val de Loire
- Coordinates: 48°37′48″N 1°08′57″E
- Country: France
- Region: Centre-Val de Loire
- Department: Eure-et-Loir
- Arrondissement: Dreux
- Canton: Saint-Lubin-des-Joncherets
- Intercommunality: CA Pays de Dreux

Government
  - Mayor (2020–2026): Arnaud de Boisanger
- Area^{1}: 41 km^{2} (16 sq mi)
- Elevation: 165 m (541 ft)
- Highest elevation: 191 m (627 ft)
- Lowest elevation: 137 m (449 ft)
- Population (2023): 941
  - Density: 23/km^{2} (59/sq mi)
- Time zone: UTC+01:00 (CET)
  - Summer (DST): UTC+02:00 (CEST)
- INSEE/Postal code: 28226 /28170
- ^{1} French Land Register data, which excludes lakes, ponds, glaciers > 1 km^{2} (0.386 sq mi or 247 acres) and river estuaries.

Maillebois (French pronunciation: [majbwa]) is a commune in the Eure-et-Loir department in northern France. The Blaise, a tributary of the Eure, runs through the town. In 1973 it absorbed three former communes: Blévy, Saint-Maixme-Hauterive and Dampierre-sur-Blévy.

== Geography ==
Maillebois along with another 70 communes shares part of a 47,681 hectare, Natura 2000 conservation area, called the Forêts et étangs du Perche.

== Population ==
Historical population
Year	Pop.	±% p.a.
1968	770	—
1975	843	+1.30%
1982	828	−0.26%
1990	821	−0.11%
1999	917	+1.24%
2007	988	+0.94%
2012	956	−0.66%
2017	922	−0.72%
2023	941	+0.34%
Source: INSEE

== Places of interest ==
- Chateau de Maillebois, a registered monument
- Rouvray farm, a former Chateau Fort (which is a fortified building, like a fortress, but often also a practical building) and registered monument. It was a fort during the Hundred Years' War.
- Les Forges de Dampierre-sur-Blévy, a former foundry and a registered monument
- Dreux-Louvilliers Air Base is a former United States Air Force base near Maillebois

== Famous residents ==
- Jean-Baptiste Francois des Marets, marquis of Maillebois, was a Marshal of France.
- Paul-Félix Armand-Delille, bacteriologist who introduced the myxomatosis virus in his estate of the château.
- Hubert Latham lived in the Chateau de Maillebois (the family home)

== See also ==
- Communes of the Eure-et-Loir department

== Gallery ==
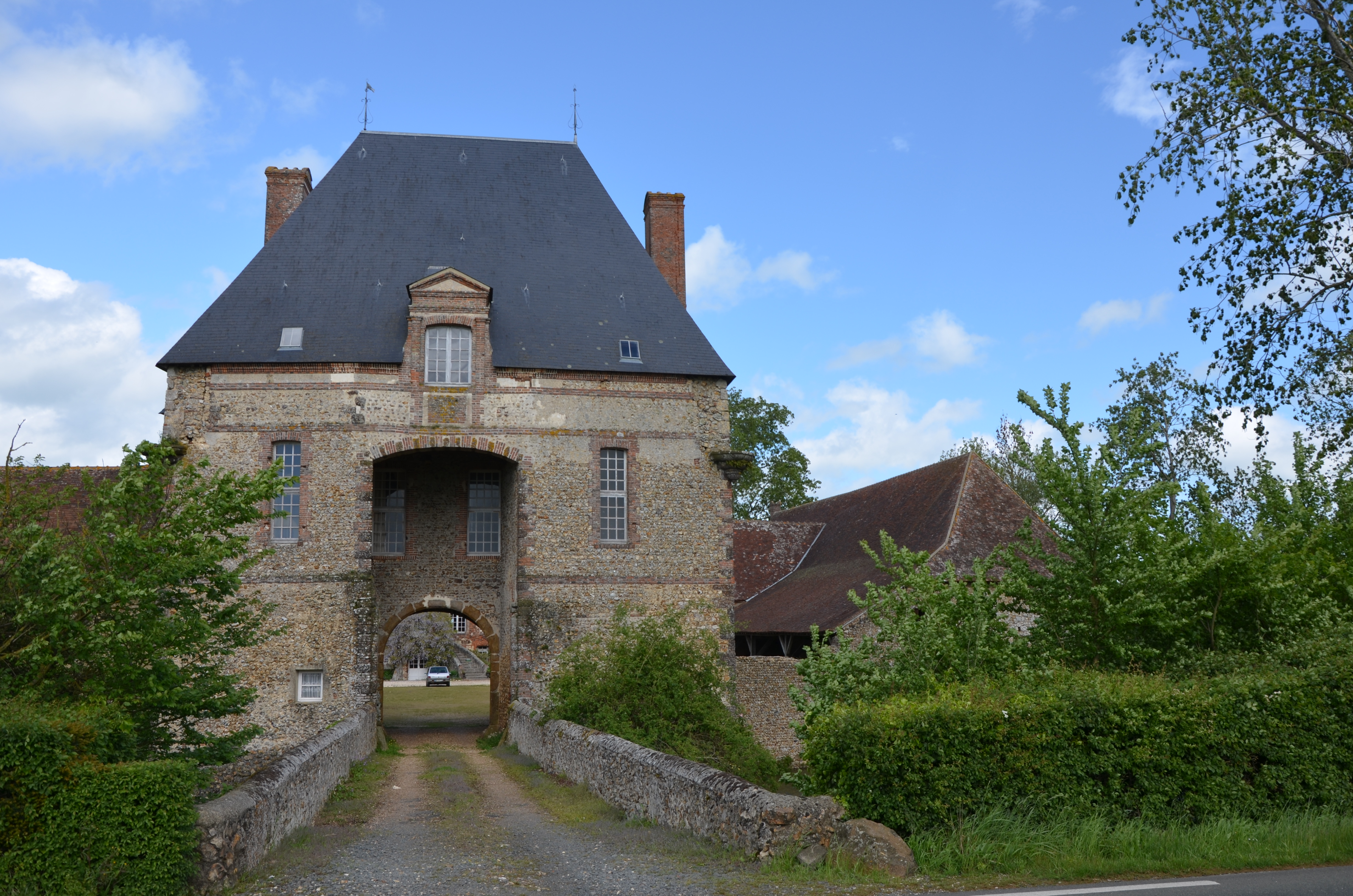
Rouvray farm

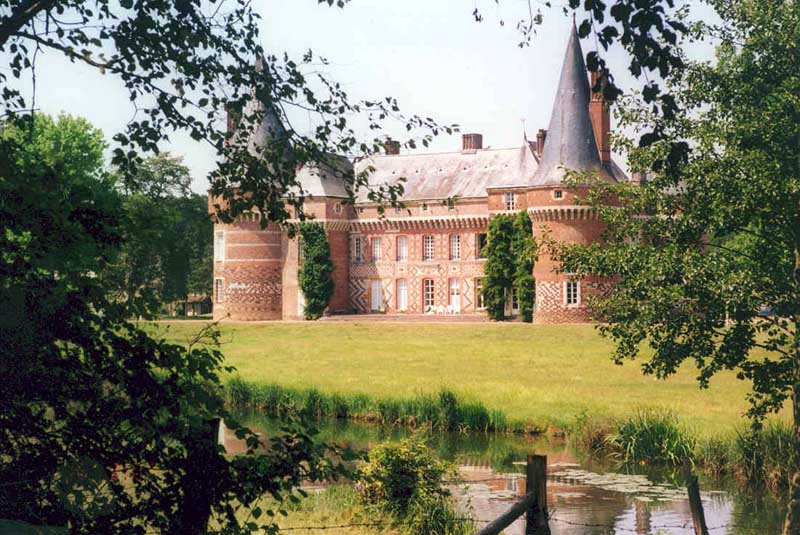
Chateau de Maillebois

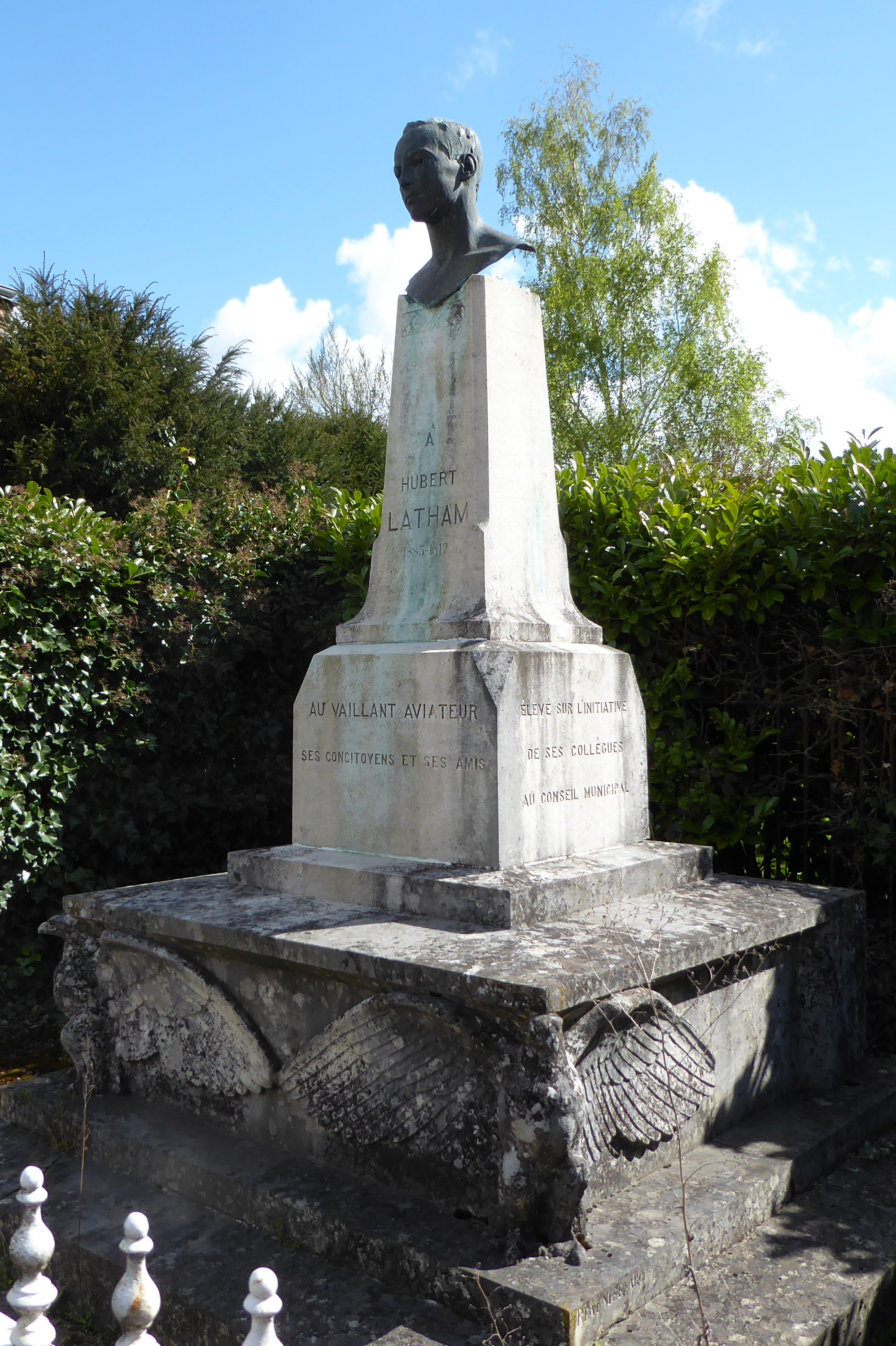
Bust of Hubert Latham in the town centre.

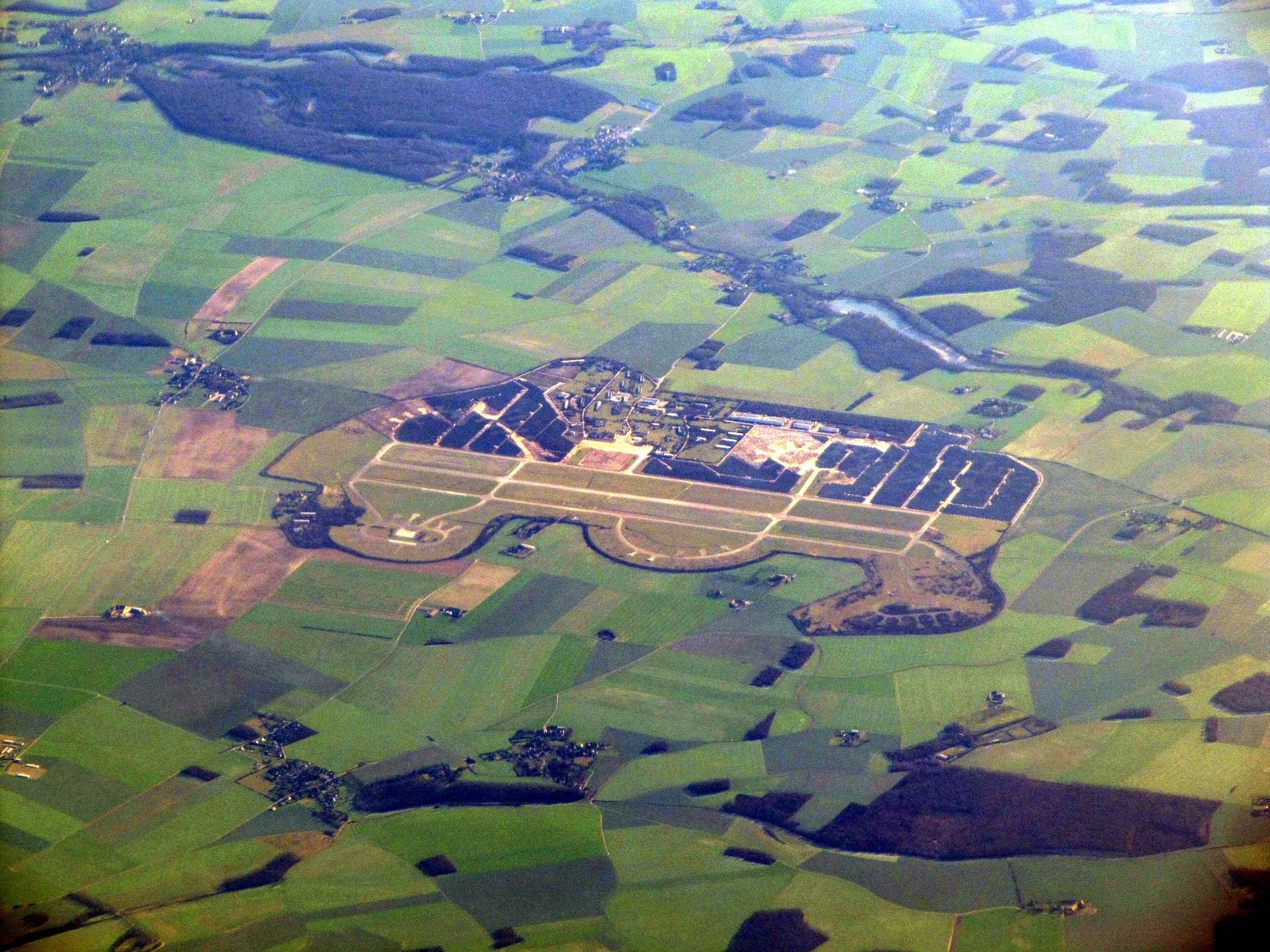
Aerial photograph of Dreux-Louvilliers Air Base

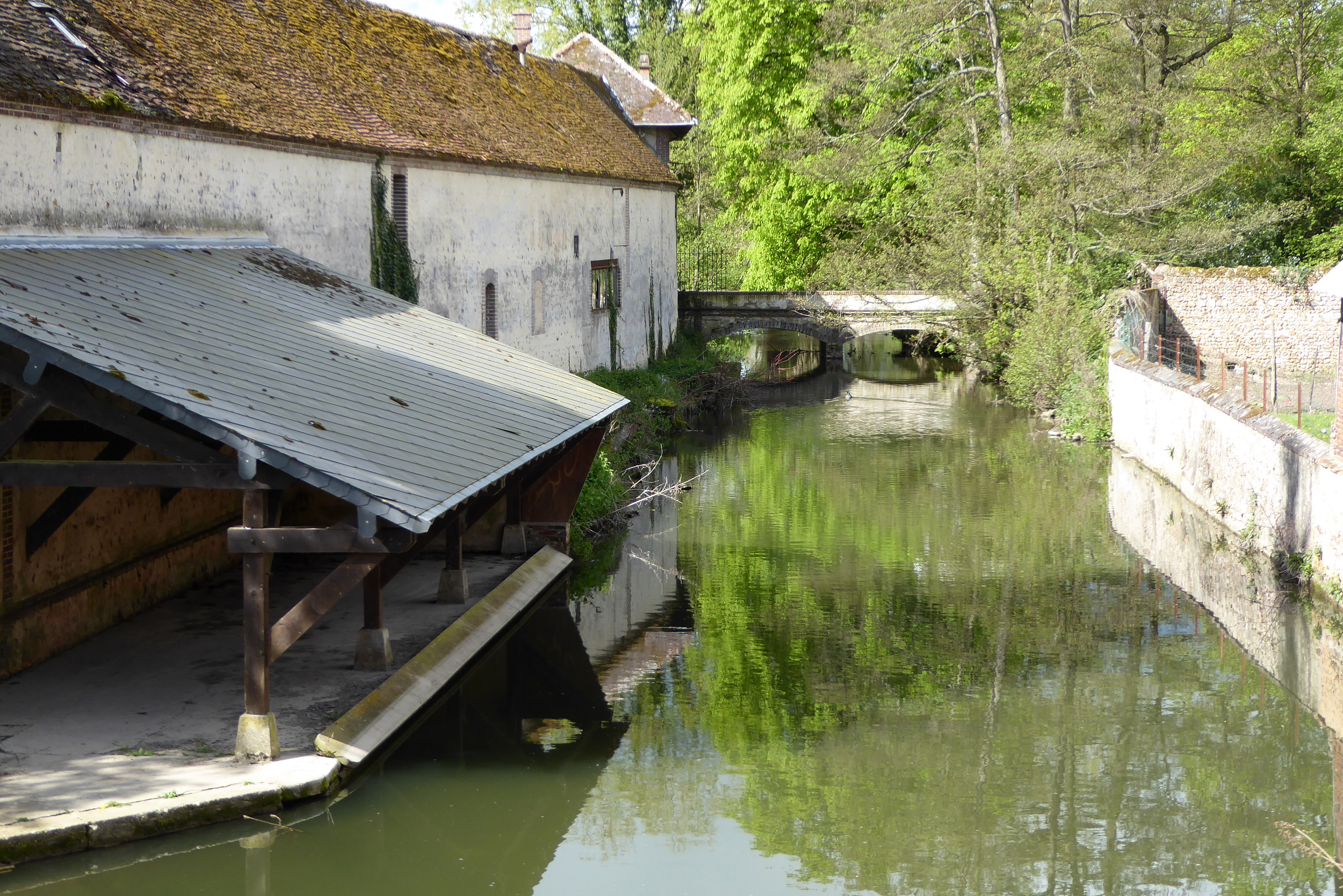
The Blaise in Maillebois
