= Margarita Island kangaroo rat =

Conservation status
- Critically Endangered (IUCN 2.3)

Scientific classification
- Kingdom: Animalia
- Phylum: Chordata
- Class: Mammalia
- Order: Rodentia
- Family: Heteromyidae
- Genus: Dipodomys
- Species: D. merriami
- Subspecies: D. m. margaritae

Trinomial name
- Dipodomys merriami margaritae Merriam, 1907

Subspecies of rodent

The Margarita Island kangaroo rat (Dipodomys merriami margaritae) is a subspecies of rodent in the family Heteromyidae.

It is endemic to Mexico, where it is found only on Isla Santa Margarita of Magdalena Bay, Baja California Sur. The natural habitat of the species is hot deserts. It is threatened by predation by feral cats and dogs.
