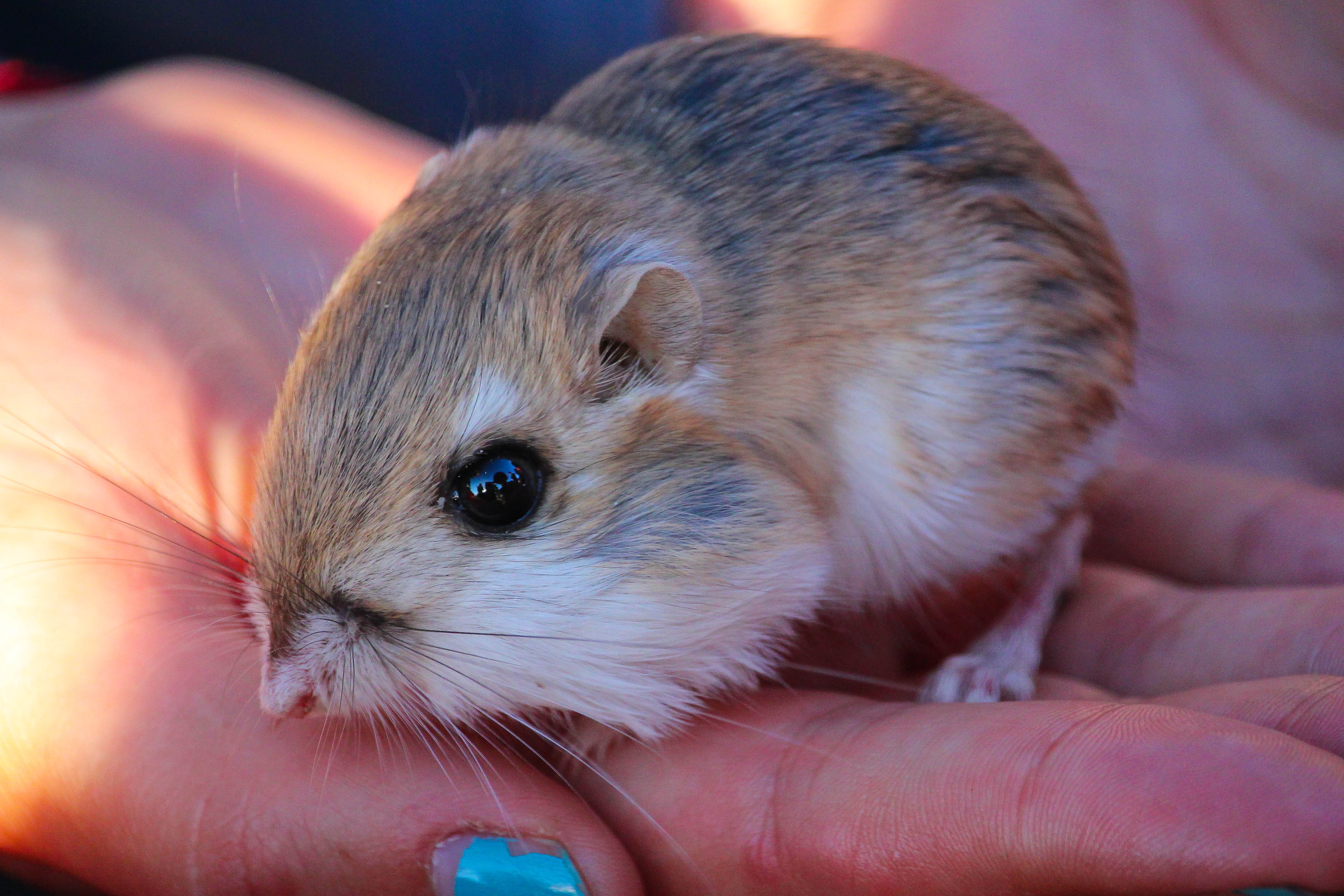

Conservation status
- Least Concern (IUCN 3.1)

Scientific classification
- Kingdom: Animalia
- Phylum: Chordata
- Class: Mammalia
- Order: Rodentia
- Family: Heteromyidae
- Genus: Dipodomys
- Species: D. merriami

Binomial name
- Dipodomys merriami Mearns, 1890

Subspecies
- Dipodomys merriami ambiguus Dipodomys merriami annulus Dipodomys merriami arenivagus Dipodomys merriami atronasus Dipodomys merriami brunensis Dipodomys merriami collinus Dipodomys merriami frenatus Dipodomys merriami insularis Dipodomys merriami margaritae Dipodomys merriami mayensis Dipodomys merriami melanurus Dipodomys merriami mitchelli Dipodomys merriami olivaceus Dipodomys merriami parvus Dipodomys merriami platycephalus Dipodomys merriami quintinensis Dipodomys merriami trinidadensis Dipodomys merriami vulcani
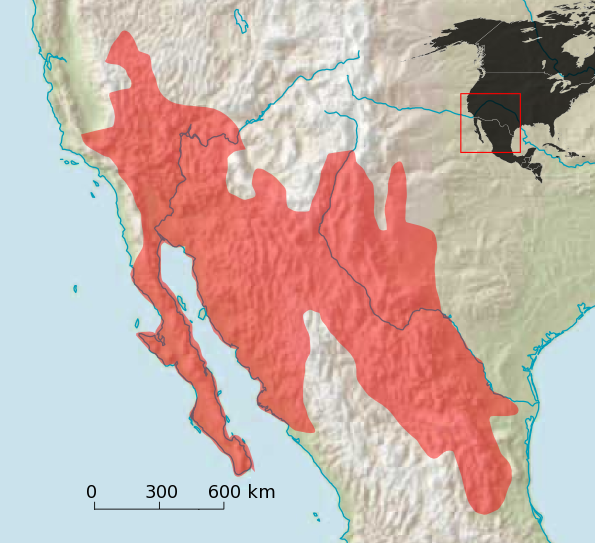

= Merriam's kangaroo rat =

Merriam's Kangaroo Rat

Species of rodent

Merriam's kangaroo rat (Dipodomys merriami) is a species of rodent in the family Heteromyidae. The species name commemorates Clinton Hart Merriam. It is found in the Upper and Lower Sonoran life zones of the southwestern United States, Baja California, and northern Mexico.

== Description ==
Merriam's kangaroo rats, like other kangaroo rats and pocket mice, are members of the family Heteromyidae. Each species within this family has fur-lined food storage pouches. The cheek pouch is utilized as a portable cache for food while foraging. Kangaroo rats are named for their extremely long, kangaroo-like hind feet and they are almost completely bipedal. They hop or jump rather than scurry or run. Because of this, most heteromyid rodents also have a relatively long tail that acts to counterbalance the hopping/jumping form of locomotion.

Fur color varies between populations within the species' range, but the back color is generally light brown or tan. The merriami species is smaller than most of the other kangaroo rats in the southwest. Adults average about 14 inches in length. The tail is relatively long with a large tuft of hair at the tip. The tuft is thought to act like fletching on an arrow, providing drag to keep the animal stable during locomotion. merriami have four toes on each hind foot in contrast to the pacific kangaroo rat, Dipodomys simulans and the Stephens' kangaroo rat, Dipodomys stephensi (both kangaroo rat species also found in San Diego County), which have five toes.

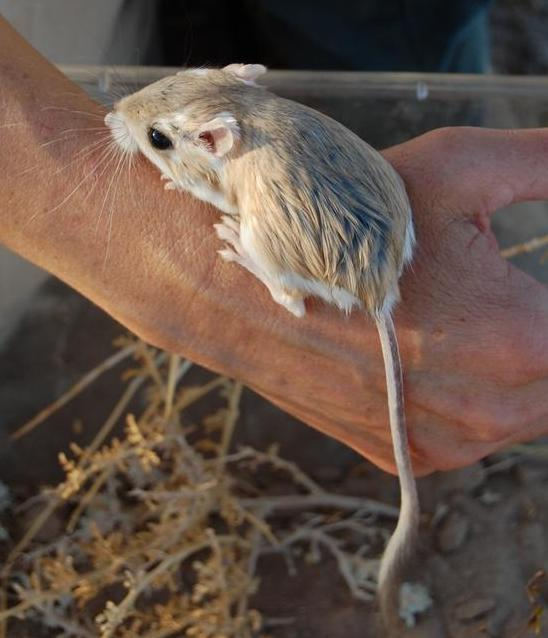
Merriam's kangaroo rat (Dipodomys merriami)

== Habitat ==
Merriam's kangaroo rat can be found in desert scrub, alkali scrub, sagebrush steppe, pinyon-juniper woodland, and Joshua tree habitat throughout the southwestern United States and Mexico.

== Behavior ==
Merriam's kangaroo rats live individually within a maze of burrows. Males and females each establish individual territories. They defend their territories against other male and female merriami, primarily to protect often scarce food resources. It is typical that they locate multiple entrances to their burrow complex at the base of shrubs near the middle of their territory. This allows more opportunities for them to escape from predators.

Most kangaroo rats are exclusively nocturnal. Even so, they tend to avoid being outside their burrows when the moon is full. The greater the amounts of moonlight the less time they spend collecting food, defending their territory, or searching for mates. When the amount of moonlight is great they retreat underground in order to avoid predation. In some areas, above ground activity is limited to two hours or less. During the day, they remain in their cool burrows. They often seal entrances to their burrows with soil to prevent exposure to heat. When they are active above ground they move about within their territory and attempt to fill their cheek pouches with seeds and plant material. When their cheek pouches are full they retreat to their burrows where they disgorge the seeds they have collected. Some of the food is eaten immediately while the remainder is stored (often building a seed cache of considerable size) in several chambers within the burrow system.

Kangaroo rats lose water mainly by evaporation during gas exchange, and so have developed a behavioural adaptation to prevent this loss. As they spend a lot of time within their burrows to escape the heat of the day, the burrows become much more humid than the air outside (due to evaporative loss). When collecting seeds, they store them in the burrows rather than eating them straight away. This causes the moisture in the air to be absorbed by the seeds, and the kangaroo rat regains the water it has previously lost when it then consumes them.

== Reproduction ==
Merriam's kangaroo rats produce up to three litters per year, with an average of four pups in each litter. Weaning of young occurs 24–33 days after birth.

== Diet ==
The diet of Merriam's kangaroo rat is almost exclusively plant seeds (they are granivorous). The bulk of their diet consists of the seeds of desert and grassland plants. They rarely drink water. Rather, they obtain water through metabolic processes augmented by the moisture content of their food.

== Predators ==
A kangaroo rat narrowly escaping an attack by a Mohave rattlesnake

Kangaroo rats are a common prey items for many other desert animals. Typical predators of the Merriam's kangaroo rat include barn owls, great horned owls, coyotes, foxes, badgers, bobcats, and several snake species including sidewinders and glossy snakes. Cougars and American black bears are known to prey on kangaroo rats when they encounter them, although both predators typically prefer larger prey to sustain themselves.

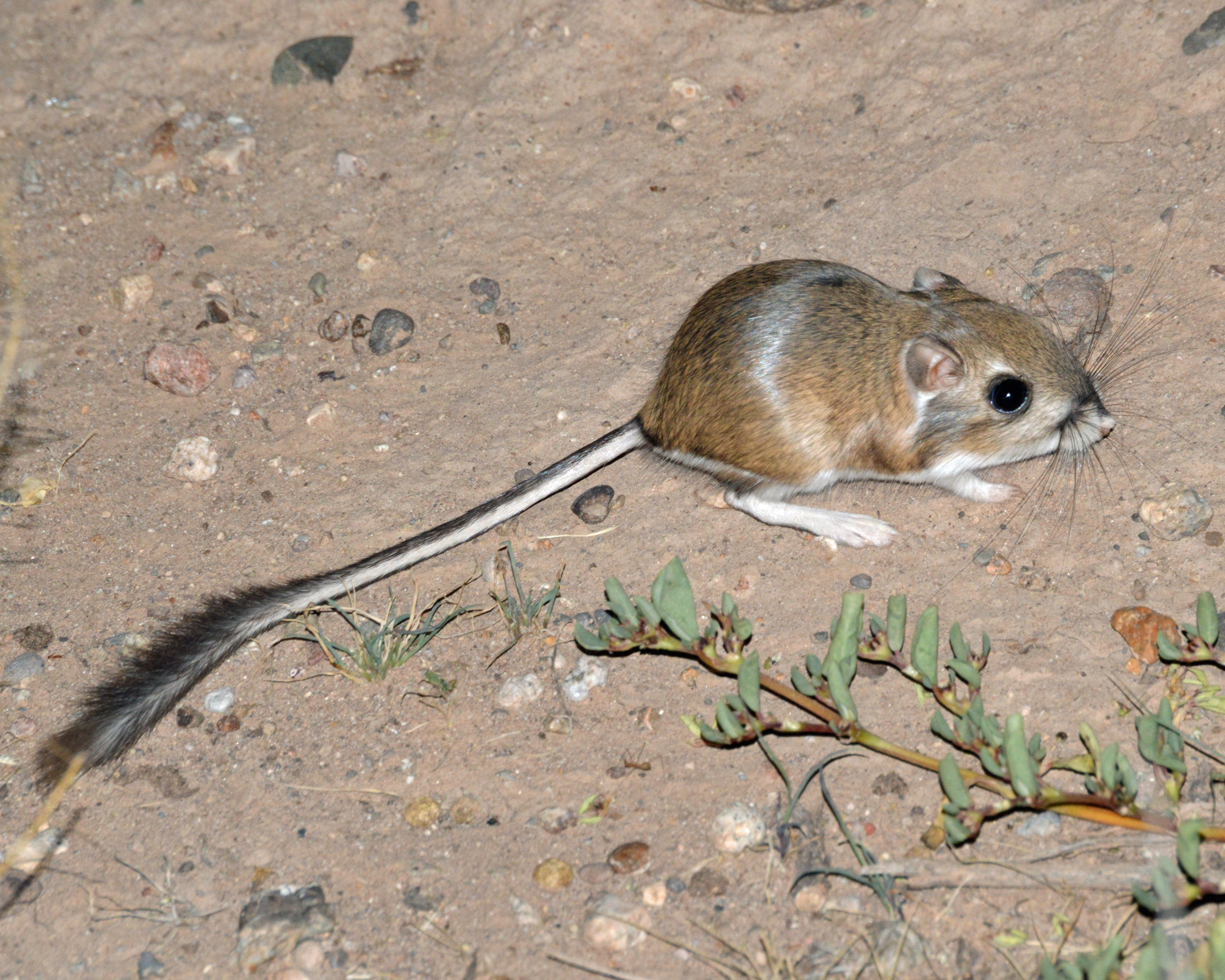
Merriam's kangaroo rat in the wild, Luna County, New Mexico

== Conservation status ==
In general humans have not caused adverse impact to the Merriam's kangaroo rat through most of its range. However, in southern California one subspecies, the San Bernardino kangaroo rat, Dipodomys merriami parvus, is at risk due primarily to urban development including construction of dams and alteration of hydrologic regimes throughout its range. Once common on alluvial plains in the washes of San Bernardino and Riverside counties, the United States Fish and Wildlife Service listed the San Bernardino kangaroo rat as endangered in 1998.
