= Spilopsyllus cuniculi =

Rabbit flea

Scientific classification
- Kingdom: Animalia
- Phylum: Arthropoda
- Clade: Pancrustacea
- Class: Insecta
- Order: Siphonaptera
- Family: Pulicidae
- Genus: Spilopsyllus
- Species: S. cuniculi

Binomial name
- Spilopsyllus cuniculi (Dale, 1878)

Species of flea

Spilopsyllus cuniculi, the rabbit flea, is a species of flea in the family Pulicidae. It is an external parasite of rabbits and hares and is occasionally found on cats and dogs and also certain seabirds that nest in burrows. It can act as a vector for the virus that causes the rabbit disease myxomatosis.

== Description ==
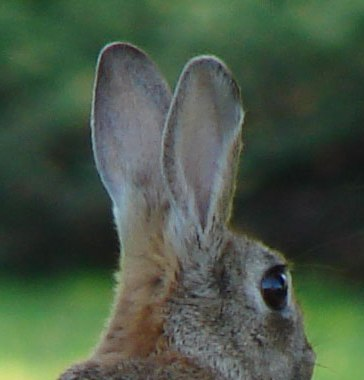
Fleas may cluster round the base of a rabbit's ears

The rabbit flea is about 1 mm (0.04 in) long and a dark brown colour. It is laterally compressed, has three pairs of legs and no wings. Its head is held at an angle to its body and its mouthparts are adapted for piercing the skin of its host and sucking its blood. It has a pronotal comb or row of spines just behind the head and a genal comb of spines below the head and these help to distinguish it from other species of flea. It is a sedentary flea that stays feeds of a single location for a long period of time. S. cuniculi have adapted to feed on the ears of rabbits, which are in rich in blood supply.

== Host species ==
S. cuniculi originated in Europe with the definitive host being the European rabbit, as the rabbit was brought overseas the flea was inadvertently brought with it and is now found in most places where the European rabbit is found. It is usually as an external parasite found on rabbits and hares but occasionally also on cats and dogs. It can work its way through the animal's fur but is usually found in clusters around the bases of the host's ears. On some of the islands off the coasts of the United Kingdom it can be found on Manx shearwaters and Atlantic puffins, presumably because the birds nest in burrows and often take over holes previously occupied by rabbits.

== Life cycle ==
Adult female rabbit fleas can detect the changing levels of certain hormones in a female rabbit's blood that show that she is near to parturition. This triggers sexual maturity in the fleas and they mate and start producing eggs. As soon as the young rabbits are born, the fleas move onto them and start feeding, mating and laying eggs. About twelve days later, they return to the mother rabbit. They complete this migration every time she produces a litter of young. The larvae are legless grubs, creamy-white with a brown head. After three larval stages they pupate. Fleas newly emerged from the pupa need to have a blood meal within a week, otherwise they will die. After that they can survive for many months without feeding. The optimum temperature for the flea's life cycle is 70 to 85 °F (21 to 29 °C).

== Disease transmission ==
Myxomatosis is a virus disease of rabbits which can be fatal. The symptoms are swelling of the eyelids and lips, conjunctivitis and the formation of skin tumours on the face, ears and limbs. The rabbit flea acts as a vector for the disease and the virus has been shown to remain viable in the flea's mouthparts for at least one hundred days. The rabbit flea has also been implicated in the transmission of the Bartonella alsatica bacterium, an opportunistic pathogen that causes disease in animals and man.
