= Kinetic class (virology) =

A kinetic class, also known as a temporal class, is a grouping of genes in a viral genome that are expressed at the same time during the viral replication cycle. Five of the human DNA viral families have multiple kinetic classes: Poxviridae, Herpesviridae, Adenoviridae, Papillomaviridae, and Polyomaviridae. All of the genes in a particular kinetic class are activated by the same mechanism: either by the process of the virus entering the cell and uncoating, or by the products of an earlier kinetic class in what is known as a transcriptional cascade. Generally speaking, earlier kinetic classes code for enzymes that direct the viral replication process, and later kinetic classes code for structural proteins to be packaged into virions

== Viruses with three kinetic classes: Poxviridae, Herpesviridae, and Adenoviridae ==
Multiple naming schemes exist in virus families that have three kinetic classes; some refer to the three classes as 1) immediate-early 2) early and 3) late, and some refer to these same classes as 1) early 2) intermediate and 3) late. The former naming scheme is adopted below because it emphasizes the relative similarity in function of the first two classes compared to the third.

=== Immediate-early class ===
The first genes expressed, in the immediate-early class, prepare the virus for replication and protect it from host defenses. These genes are activated in Poxviruses by enzymes packaged in the virion itself. They are responsible for dissolving the virion capsid, directing DNA replication (in Poxviruses), protecting the virus from the host's interferon and complement defenses (in Poxviruses), and activating the early class of genes.

=== Early class ===
The second class of genes continues to combat host defenses, stimulates DNA replication (in Herpesviruses), and activates the late class. In Herpesviruses, the early class is known as the beta class and replicates the DNA genome starting from three different origins of replication. In Adenoviruses, it consists of two transcription units, IVa2 and IX.

=== Late class ===
The late class consists primarily of structural proteins and assembly enzymes, and is dependent in all three families on the prior synthesis of viral DNA copies. In Herpesviruses, for example, the late class consists of gamma-1 and gamma-2 genes. After the late class is expressed, the virions can assemble and exit the cell.

== Viruses with two kinetic classes: Papillomaviridae and Polyomaviridae ==
=== Early class ===
The early proteins produced in Papillomaviruses and Polyomaviruses regulate the cell cycle and activate DNA replication. In Papillomaviruses, they are called E1 through E7 and also stimulate cellular replication. In Polyomavirus, the early proteins are T antigens.

=== Late class ===
The late proteins make up the virus capsid. In Polyomaviruses, they are known as VP1, VP2, and VP3; in Papillomaviruses they are called L1 and L2 (for “late”).
