= San José Island =

San José Island could refer to:

- San José Island (Colombia), a river island in the Rio Negro
- San José Island (Texas), United States
- Isla San José (Baja California Sur), Mexico
- Isla San José (Panama), Pearl Islands, Panama
- Weddell Island, Falkland Islands (claimed as "Isla San José" by Argentina)

== See also ==
- Saint Joseph Island (disambiguation)
