= San José brush rabbit =

Conservation status
- Critically Endangered (IUCN 3.1)

Scientific classification
- Kingdom: Animalia
- Phylum: Chordata
- Class: Mammalia
- Order: Lagomorpha
- Family: Leporidae
- Genus: Sylvilagus
- Species: S. bachmani
- Subspecies: S. b. mansuetus

Trinomial name
- Sylvilagus bachmani mansuetus Nelson, 1907
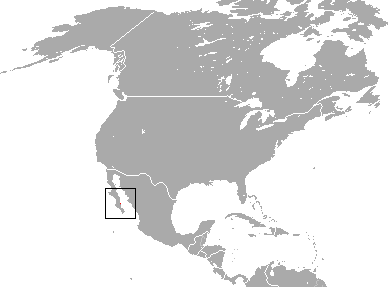
- San Jose brush rabbit range

Species of mammal

The San José brush rabbit (Sylvilagus bachmani mansuetus) is a critically endangered subspecies of the brush rabbit, in the family Leporidae.

== Taxonomy ==
It was formerly thought to be its own species, but more recent studies indicate that it is a subspecies of S. bachmani.

== Distribution ==
It is endemic to the 170 km^{2} (66 sq mi) San José Island in the Gulf of California, a desert habitat island in the state of Baja California Sur in Mexico. The island is only separated from the mainland by a 5–8 km (3.1–5.0 mi) channel. The rabbit only occurs on roughly 20 km^{2} (8 sq mi) with a population density estimated at 25-35 individuals per km^{2}.

== Conservation ==
The subspecies is listed as critically endangered on the IUCN Red List, which was last updated on May 31, 2016. This is due primarily to predation by feral cats, and are also effected by habitat loss, human developments and rats and hunting which have all led to population declines since 1995/1996. To preserve the species it has been recommended that the feral cats be removed and further research be conducted. Although protected under Mexican law they are commonly poached by hunters legally hunting invasive goat species.

== Description ==
The San José brush rabbit is distinguishable from its relatives by its palеr pelage, larger ears and longer and more narrow skull. The winter pelage bull yellow or yellow-grey with short black tips. The sided are pale and grey compared to its top pelage.

== Behavior ==
S. b. mansuetus has been seen resting in the shade of trees on the island such as the Palo Verde. The rabbit becomes reproductively active in November. Being crepuscular the rabbit is most active from sunset till 2am, and 6am to 10am. San José Island is home to one of the most diverse mammalian populations of the islands in Baja California. Areas on the island rich in the plants; Fouquieria digueti, Jatropha cinerea, Pachicerus pringley, Opuntia cholla, B. microphylla, Simmondsia chinensis, Cercidium peninsulare, Stenocerus gummosus, Cyrtocarpa edulis, Esenbeckia flava, Lycium and Olneya tesota usually have the highest abundance of S. b. mansuetus. The name mansuetus is derived from Latin and means tame, regarding how close S. b. mansuetus can be approached.

== See also ==
- Fauna of Gulf of California islands
- Endemic fauna of Mexico
