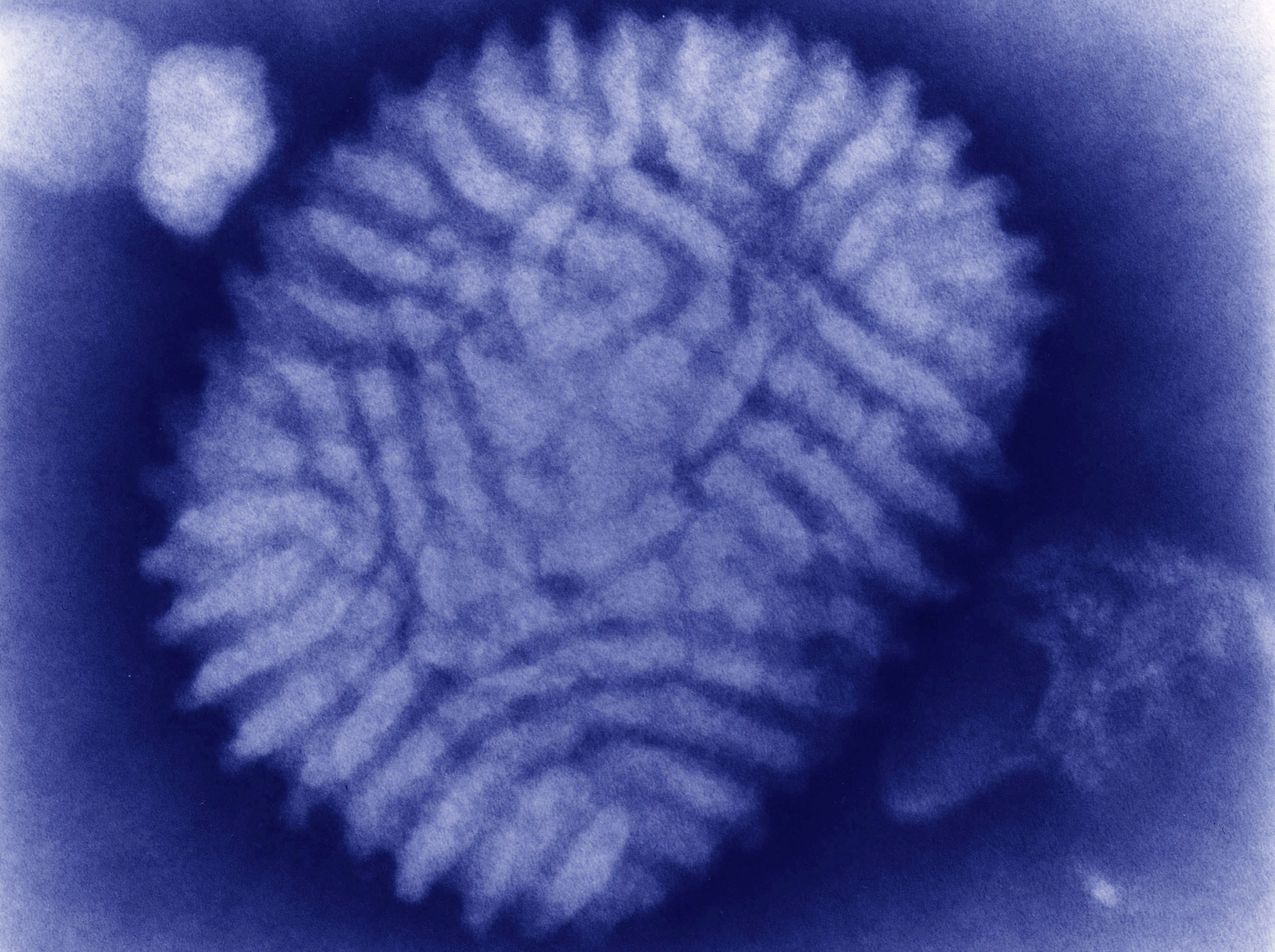
- Myxoma virus (transmission electron microscope)

Virus classification
- (unranked): Virus
- Realm: Varidnaviria
- Kingdom: Bamfordvirae
- Phylum: Nucleocytoviricota
- Class: Pokkesviricetes
- Order: Chitovirales
- Family: Poxviridae
- Genus: Leporipoxvirus
- Species: Myxoma virus

= Myxomatosis =

Myxoma virus

Rabbit disease caused by Myxoma virus

Myxomatosis is a disease caused by Myxoma virus, a rabbit poxvirus in the genus Leporipoxvirus. The natural hosts are tapeti (forest cottontail, Sylvilagus brasiliensis) in South and Central America, and brush rabbits (Sylvilagus bachmani) in North America. The myxoma virus causes only a mild disease in these species, but causes a severe and usually fatal disease in European rabbits (Oryctolagus cuniculus), the species of rabbit commonly raised for companionship and as a food source.

Myxomatosis is an example of what occurs when a virus jumps from a species adapted to the virus to a naive host, and has been extensively studied for this reason. The virus was intentionally introduced in Australia, France, and Chile in the 1950s to control wild European rabbit populations.

== Cause ==
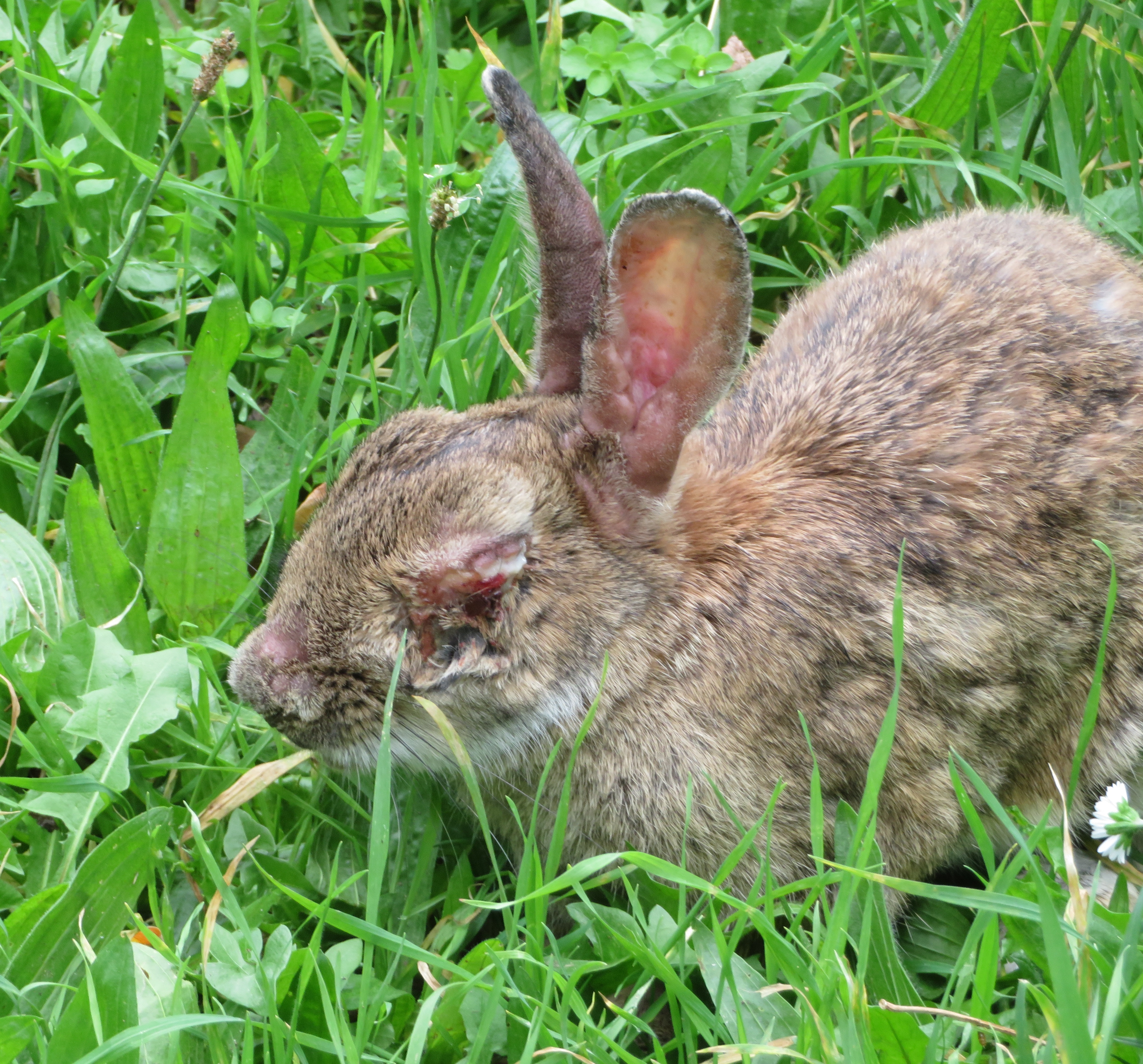
Wild rabbit with inflammation of eyes and nose caused by myxomatosis (Germany).

Myxoma virus is in the genus Leporipoxvirus of subfamily Chordopoxvirinae. Like other poxviruses, myxoma viruses are large DNA viruses with linear double-stranded DNA. Viral replication occurs in the cytoplasm of the cell. The natural hosts are tapeti (Sylvilagus brasiliensis) in South and Central America, and brush rabbits (Sylvilagus bachmani) in North America. The myxoma virus causes only a mild disease in these species, with signs limited to the formation of skin nodules.

Myxomatosis is the name of the severe and often fatal disease in European rabbits caused by the myxoma virus. Different strains exist which vary in their virulence. The Californian strain, which is endemic to the West Coast of the United States and Baja in Mexico, is the most virulent, with reported case fatality rates approaching 100%. The South American strain, present in South America and Central America, is slightly less virulent, with reported case fatality rates of 99.8%. Strains present in Europe and Australia were originally introduced from South America but have become attenuated, with reported case fatality rates of 50–95%. While wild rabbits in Europe and Australia have developed some immunity to the virus, this is not generally true of pet rabbits.

== Transmission ==
Myxomatosis is transmitted primarily by hematophagic arthropods. The myxoma virus does not replicate in these arthropod hosts, but is physically carried by biting arthropods from one rabbit to another. In North America mosquitoes are the primary mode of pathogen transmission, and multiple species of mosquito can carry the virus. In Europe and Australia the rabbit flea is the primary means of transmission, with the virus able to survive 3–4 months in the flea. Transmission via the bites of flies, lice, and mites have also been documented. Outbreaks have a seasonal nature and are most likely to occur between August and November, but cases can occur year round. Seasonality is driven by the availability of arthropod vectors and the proximity of infected wild rabbits.

The myxoma virus can also be transmitted by direct contact. Infected rabbits shed the virus in ocular and nasal secretions and from areas of eroded skin. The virus may also be present in semen and genital secretions. Poxviruses are fairly stable in the environment and can be spread by contaminated objects such as water bottles, feeders, caging, or people's hands. They are resistant to drying but are sensitive to some disinfectants.

== Pathophysiology ==
A laboratory study in which European rabbits received intradermal injections of a South American strain of the myxoma virus demonstrated the following progression of disease. Initially the virus multiplied in the skin at the site of inoculation. Approximately two days following inoculation the virus was found in nearby lymph nodes, and at three days it was found in the bloodstream and abdominal organs. At approximately four days the virus was isolated from non-inoculated skin as well as from the testes. Slight thickening of the eyelids and the presence of virus in conjunctival fluid was detectable on day five. Testicular engorgement was noticed on day six.

== Clinical presentation: South American strains ==
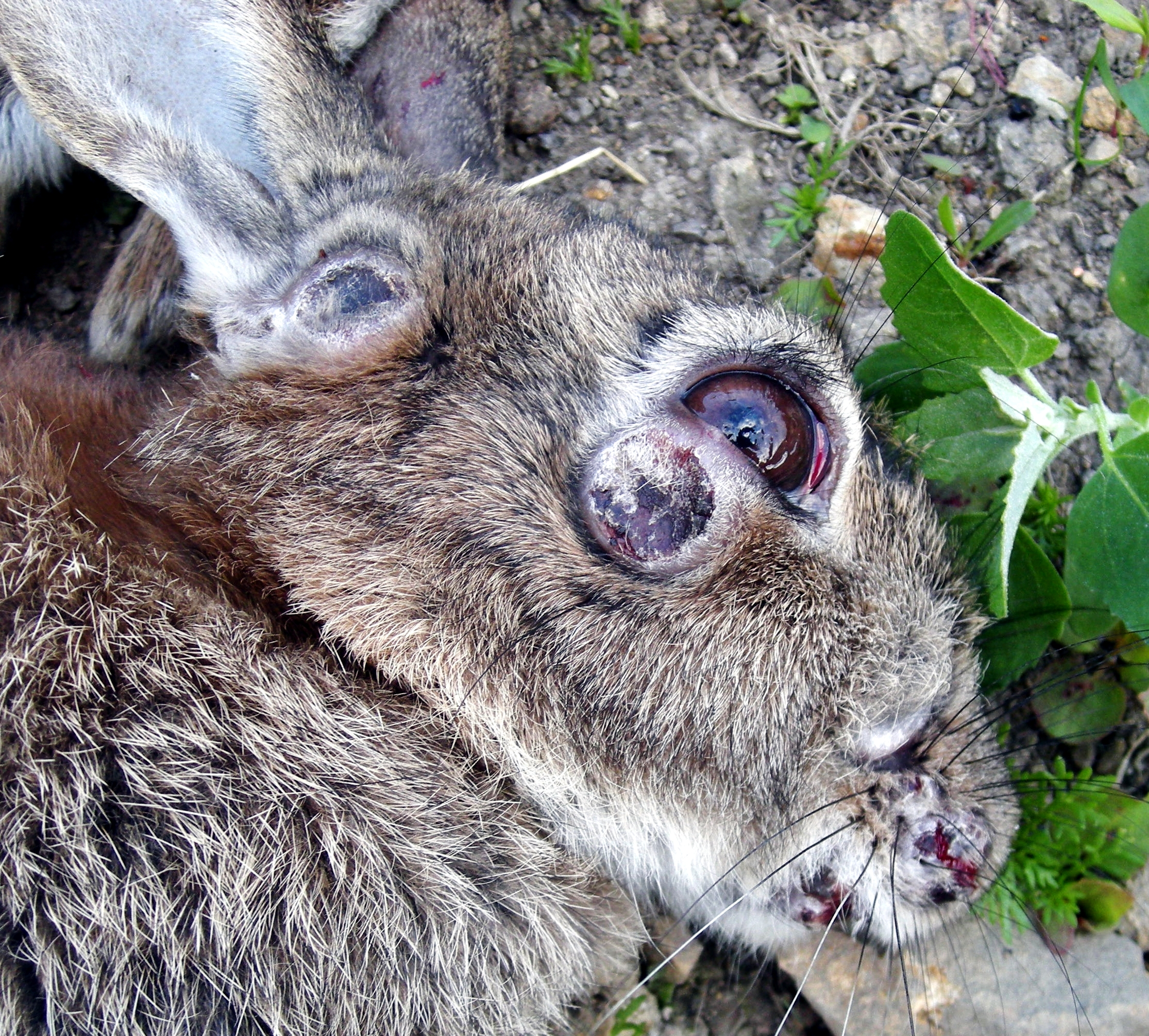
European rabbit with skin nodules caused by myxomatosis (West Yorkshire, UK)

The clinical signs of myxomatosis depend on the strain of virus, the route of inoculation, and the immune status of the host. Signs of the classic nodular form of the disease include a subcutaneous mass at the site of inoculation, multiple cutaneous nodules, swelling and edema of the eyelids and genitals, a milky or purulent ocular discharge, fever, lethargy, depression, and anorexia. The Lausanne strain causes the formation of large purple nodules, a sign not seen in other strains. According to Meredith (2013), the typical time course of the disease is as follows:

Days after infection	Clinical signs
2–4	Swelling at site of infection
4	Fever
6	Swelling of eyelids, face, base of ears, and anogenital area
6	Secondary skin lesions, including red pinpoint lesions on eyelids and raised masses on body
6–8	Clear ocular and nasal discharge that becomes mucopurulent and crusting
7–8	Respiratory distress
8–9	Hypothermia
10	Complete closure of eyelids due to swelling
10–12	Death

In peracute disease with a highly virulent strain, death may occur within 5 to 6 days of infection with minimal clinical signs other than conjunctivitis. Death usually occurs between days 10 and 12. In rabbits infected with attenuated, less virulent strains of the virus, the lesions seen are more variable and generally milder, and the time course is delayed and prolonged. Many rabbits will survive and the cutaneous lesions gradually scab and fall off, leaving scarring. A milder form of the disease is also seen in previously vaccinated domestic rabbits that have partial immunity. Vaccinated rabbits often present with localized scabbed lesions, frequently on the bridge of the nose and around the eyes, or multiple cutaneous masses over the body. The rabbits are often still bright and alert, and survive with nursing care.

Respiratory signs are a common finding in rabbits that survive the first stages of myxomatosis. Mucopurulent nasal discharge occurs, leading to gasping and stertorous respiration with extension of the head and neck. Secondary bacterial pneumonia occurs in many cases. Chronic respiratory disease, such as nasal discharge, is common in surviving rabbits. Even in apparently recovered rabbits, it is not unusual to find lung lobes filled with fluid rather than air at necropsy.

Since the 1970s an "amyxomatous" form of the disease has been reported in Europe which lacks the cutaneous nodules typical of myxomatosis. This form is clinically milder and generally nonlethal. Respiratory signs, including clear or purulent nasal discharge, predominate. Perineal edema, swollen eyelids, and purulent blepharoconjunctivitis are generally still present. This form has been observed in wild rabbits, but is significant mainly in farmed rabbits.

== Clinical presentation: North American strains of myxomatosis ==
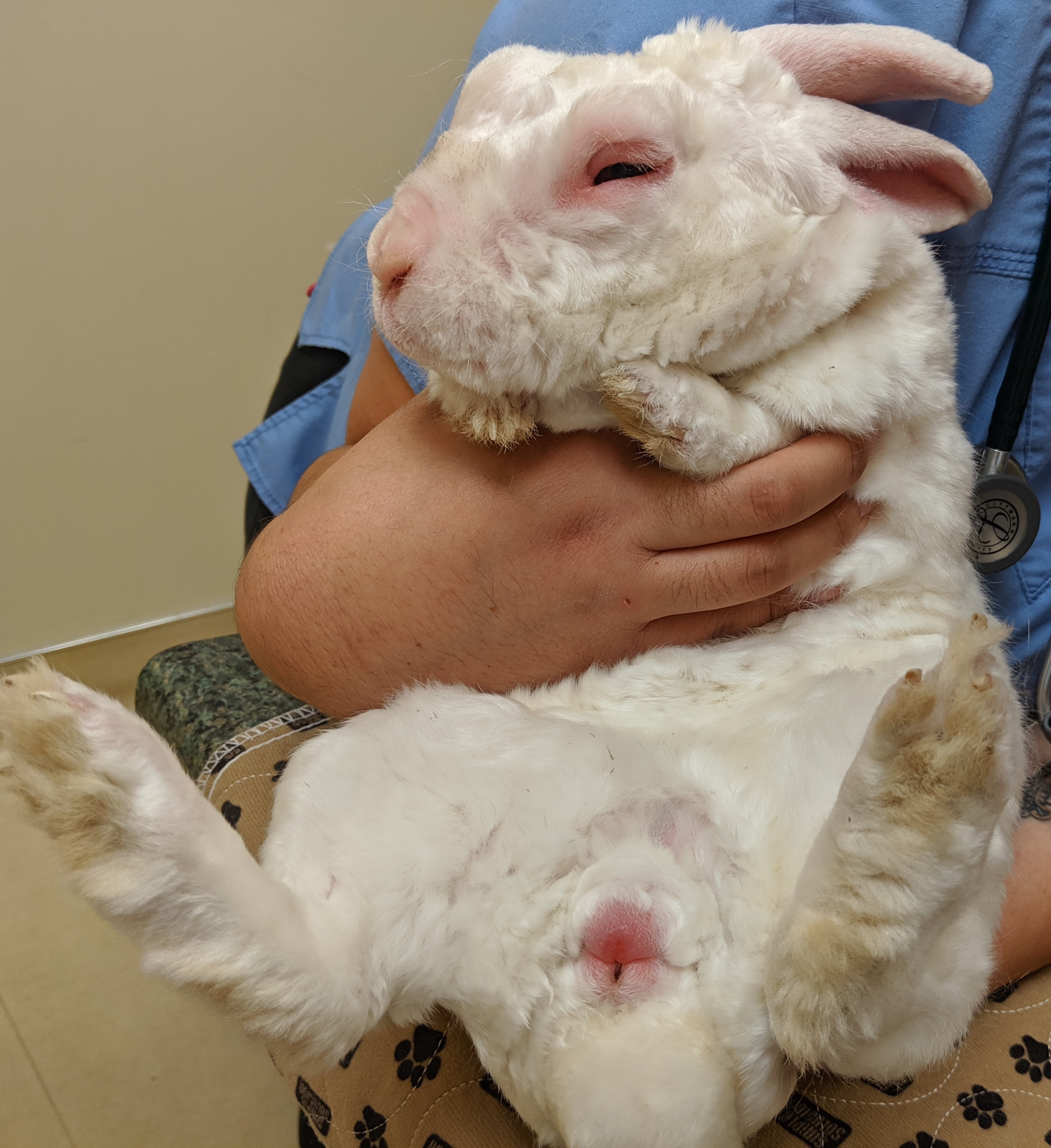
Pet rabbit with myxomatosis caused by the MSW strain of myxoma virus (Santa Cruz, CA), showing swollen eyelids and genitals

The distribution of myxomatosis in North America is restricted to the native habitat of the brush rabbit, which extends from western Oregon and California to Baja California in Mexico. This is because the brush rabbit is the only carrier of myxoma virus in North America. Other native cottontail rabbits and hares are incapable of transmitting the disease.

=== California ===
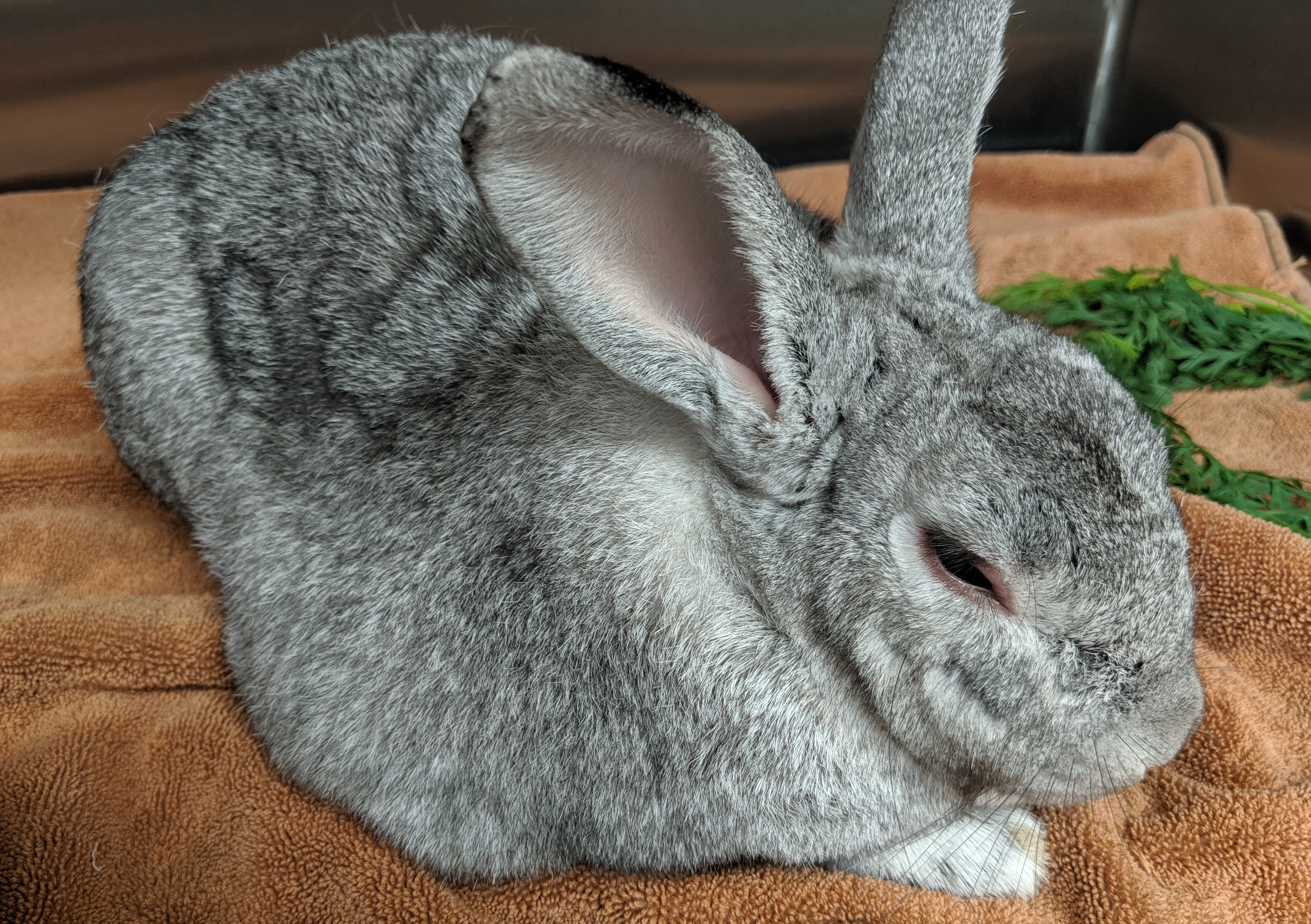
Pet rabbit with myxomatosis caused by the MSW strain of myxoma virus (Santa Cruz, CA), showing facial swelling and subcutaneous edema

A 1931 paper reported twelve cases of myxomatosis from Santa Barbara, Ventura, and San Diego counties of California. Affected rabbits developed mucopurulent conjunctivitis and swelling of the nose, lips, ears, and external genitalia. Rabbits that survived for over a week developed cutaneous nodules on the face.

A 2024 study found that myxomatosis caused by the MSW strain (California/San Francisco 1950) of the myxoma virus occurs regularly in the greater San Jose and Santa Cruz regions of California. Common physical examination findings included swollen eyelids, swollen genitals, fever, and lethargy. Swollen lips and ears and subcutaneous edema also occurred in some rabbits. Domesticated rabbits that spent time outdoors were at greater risk of acquiring the disease, and most of the cases occurred between August and October. It was postulated that the number of cases brought to veterinarians underestimated the total number of cases, as sudden death can be the first sign noted.

=== Oregon ===
A 1977 report from western Oregon described several cases of myxomatosis. The most common clinical signs observed were inflammation and swelling of the eyelids, conjunctiva, and anogenital region. Lethargy, fever, and anorexia were also observed. A single rabbit with confirmed myxomatosis eventually recovered.

A 2003 report of a myxomatosis outbreak in western Oregon reported sudden death as a common finding. Also noted were lethargy, swollen eyelids, and swollen genital regions.

=== Baja California ===
A 2000 report from the Baja Peninsula in Mexico described two outbreaks of myxomatosis in 1993. Affected domestic rabbits developed skin nodules and respiratory symptoms.

== Diagnosis ==
Because the clinical signs of myxomatosis are distinctive and nearly pathognomonic, initial diagnosis is largely based on physical exam findings. If a rabbit dies without exhibiting the classic signs of myxomatosis, or if further confirmation is desired, a number of laboratory tests are available.

=== Histopathology ===
Tissues from rabbits suffering from myxomatosis show a number of changes on histopathology. Affected skin and mucous membranes typically show undifferentiated mesenchymal cells within a matrix of mucin, inflammatory cells, and edema. Scattered intracytoplasmic viral inclusion bodies are present in epithelial cells. Spleen and lymph nodes are often affected by lymphoid depletion. Necrotizing appendicitis and secondary infections with gram-negative bacteria have also been described.

=== Polymerase chain reaction ===
The development of molecular methods such as polymerase chain reaction (PCR) and real-time polymerase chain reaction assays has created faster and more accurate methods of myxoma virus identification. PCR can be used on swabs, fresh tissue samples, and on paraffin-embedded tissue samples to confirm the presence of the myxoma virus and as well as to identify the viral strain.

=== Other testing ===
Other means of diagnosing myxomatosis include immunohistochemistry, electron microscopy, and virus isolation. Immunohistochemistry can demonstrate the presence of myxoma virus particles in different cells and tissues of the body. Negative-stain electron microscopic examination can be used to identify the presence of a poxvirus, although it does not allow specific verification of virus species or variants. Virus isolation remains the "gold standard" against which other methods of virus detection are compared. Theoretically at least, a single viable virus present in a specimen can be grown in cultured cells, thus expanding it to produce enough material to permit further detailed characterization.

== Treatment ==
At present, no specific treatment exists for myxomatosis. Given that the mortality rate of North American strains of myxomatosis nears 100%, euthanasia is often recommended in the United States. In other countries where less virulent strains are present and vaccines against the disease are available, supportive care may help rabbits to survive the infection. Careful monitoring is necessary to avoid prolonging suffering if treatment is attempted. Cessation of food and water intake, ongoing severe weight loss, or rectal temperatures below 37 °C (98.6 °F) are reasons to consider euthanasia.

== Prevention ==
=== Vaccination ===
Vaccines against myxomatosis are available in some countries. All are modified live vaccines based either on attenuated myxoma virus strains or on the closely related Shope fibroma virus, which provides cross-immunity. It is recommended that all rabbits in areas of the world where myxomatosis is endemic be routinely vaccinated, even if kept indoors, because of the ability of the virus to be carried inside by vectors or fomites. In group situations where rabbits are not routinely vaccinated, vaccination in the face of an outbreak is beneficial in limiting morbidity and mortality. As the vaccine does not provide 100% protection, it is still important to prevent contact with wild rabbits and insect vectors. Myxomatosis vaccines must be boostered regularly to remain effective, and annual vaccinations are usually recommended.

In Europe and the United Kingdom, a bivalent vectored vaccine called Nobivac Myxo-RHD is available that protects against both myxomatosis and rabbit hemorrhagic disease. This vaccine is licensed for immunization of rabbits 5 weeks of age or older, with onset of immunity taking approximately 3 weeks. Protection against myxomatosis and rabbit hemorrhagic disease lasts for approximately 12 months, and annual vaccination is recommended to ensure continued protection. The vaccine has been shown to reduce mortality and clinical signs of myxomatosis.

Vaccination against myxomatosis is currently prohibited in Australia due to concerns that the vaccine virus could spread to wild rabbits and increase their immunity to myxomatosis. As feral rabbits in Australia already cause a great deal of environmental damage, this concern is taken seriously by the government. Many pet rabbits in Australia continue to die from myxomatosis due to their lack of immunity. There is at least one campaign to allow the vaccine for domestic pets. The Australian Veterinary Association supports the introduction of a safe and effective myxomatosis vaccine for pet rabbits, and RSPCA Australia has repeatedly called for a review of available myxoma virus vaccines and a scientific assessment of their likely impacts in the Australian setting.

=== Other preventative measures ===
In locations where myxomatosis is endemic but no vaccine is available, preventing exposure to the myxoma virus is of vital importance. The risk of a pet contracting myxomatosis can be reduced by preventing contact with wild rabbits, and by keeping rabbits indoors (preferred) or behind screens to prevent mosquito exposure. Using rabbit-safe medications to treat and prevent fleas, lice, and mites is warranted. New rabbits that could have been exposed to the virus can be quarantined for 14 days before being introduced to current pets. Any rabbit suspected of having myxomatosis can be immediately isolated, and all rabbits in the area moved indoors. To prevent the virus from spreading further any cages and cage furnishings that have come into contact with infected rabbits can be disinfected, and owners can disinfect their hands between rabbits. Poxviruses are stable in the environment and can be spread by fomites but are highly sensitive to chemical disinfection; bleach, ammonia, and alcohol can all be used to deactivate myxoma virus.

== Reporting ==
Myxomatosis is a reportable disease in California, the United States, and Mexico. Veterinarians and pet owners who see this disease are encouraged to report all cases to the relevant agencies. Without accurate data on myxomatosis in North America, vaccine manufacturers will underestimate the need for a vaccine and be reluctant to produce one.

== Use as a population control agent ==
Rabbit and myxomatosis introductions around the world with dates

Myxoma virus was the first virus intentionally introduced into the wild with the purpose of eradicating a vertebrate pest, namely the European rabbit in Australia and Europe. The long-term failure of this strategy has been due to natural selective pressures on both the rabbit and virus populations, which has resulted in the emergence of myxomatosis-resistant animals and attenuated virus variants. This process is regarded as a classical example of host–pathogen coevolution following cross-species transmission of a pathogen.

=== Australia ===
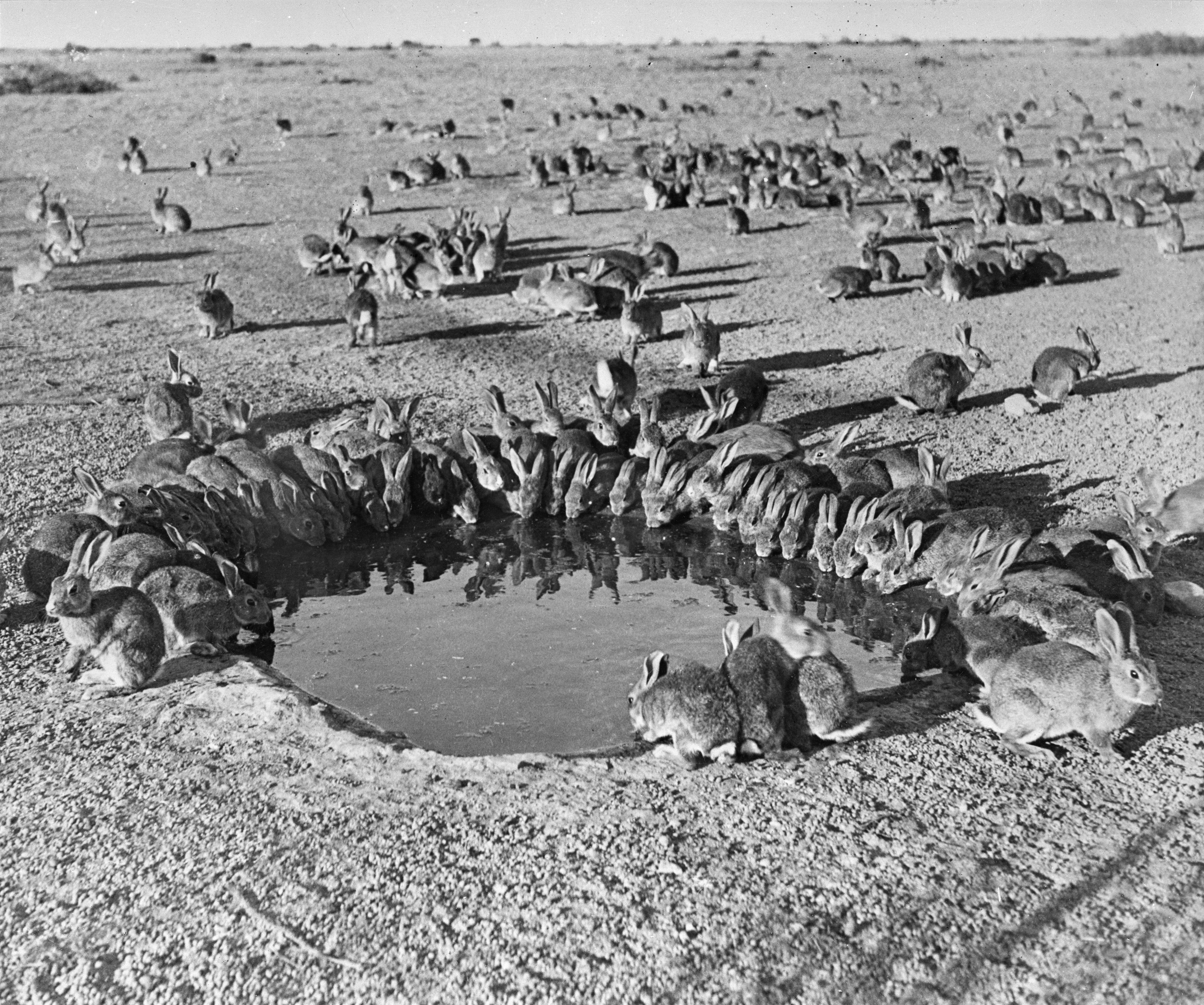
Rabbits around a waterhole in the myxomatosis trial site on Wardang Island, Australia in 1938

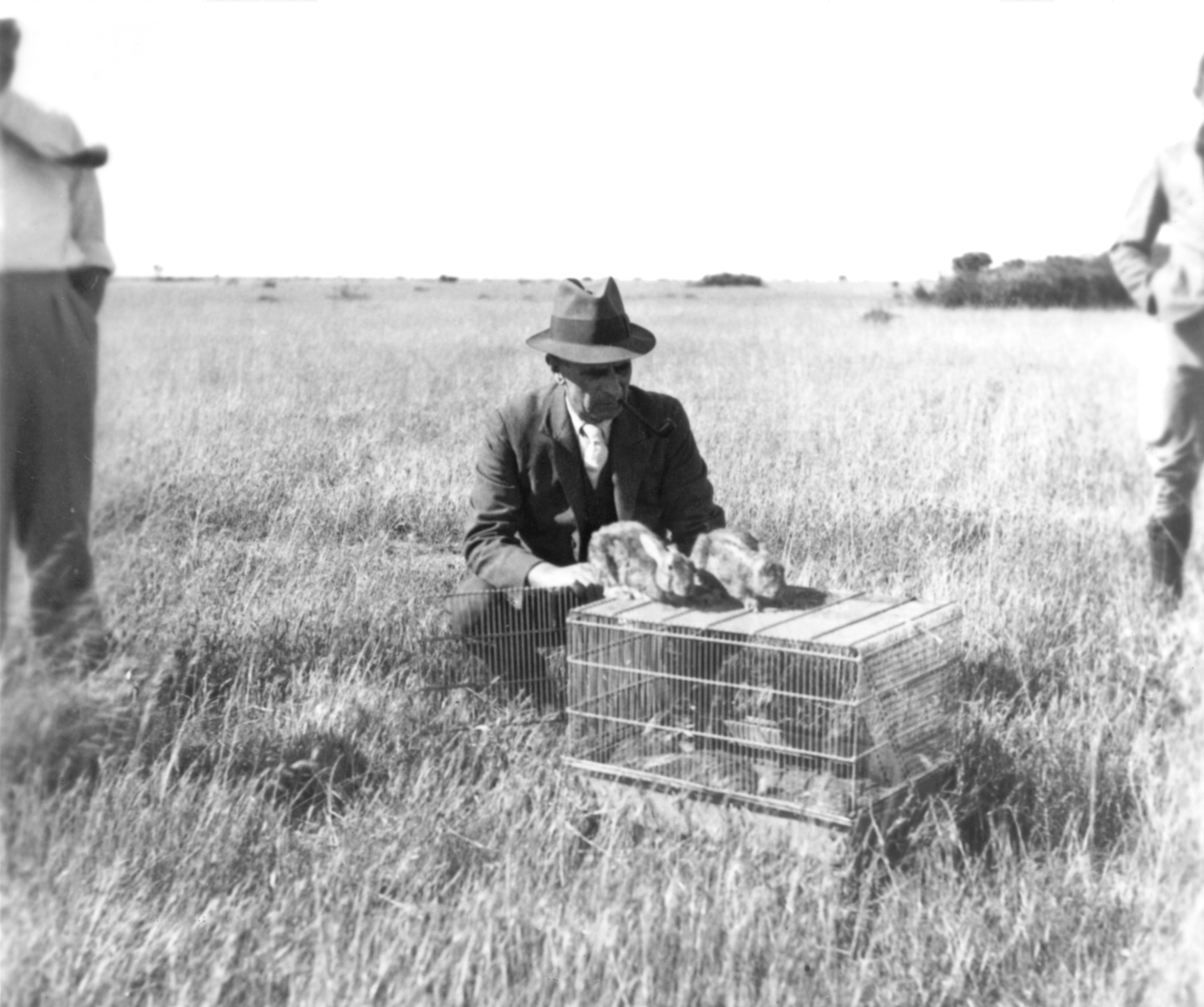
Releasing the myxoma virus in Australia

European rabbits were brought to Australia in 1788 by early English settlers. Initially used as a food source, they later became feral and their numbers soared. In November 1937, the Australian Council for Scientific and Industrial Research used Wardang Island to conduct its first field trials of myxomatosis, which established the methodology for the successful release of myxoma virus throughout the country.

In 1950, the SLS strain of myxoma virus from the South American tapeti (Sylvilagus brasiliensis) was released in Australia as a biological control agent against feral rabbits. The virus was at first highly lethal, with an estimated case fatality rate of close to 99.8%. Within a few years, however, this strain was replaced by less virulent ones, which permitted longer survival of infected rabbits and enhanced disease transmission. The virus created strong selection pressure for the evolution of rabbits resistant to myxomatosis. As rabbits became more resistant the viral strains responded by becoming less virulent. Rabbit hemorrhagic disease virus has also been used to control wild rabbit populations in Australia since 1995.

=== Europe ===
In June 1952, Paul-Félix Armand-Delille, the owner of an estate in northwestern France, inoculated two wild rabbits with the Lausanne strain of myxoma virus. His intention was only to eradicate rabbits on his property, but the disease quickly spread through Western Europe, Ireland, and the United Kingdom. Some dissemination of the virus appeared deliberate, such as its introduction into the islands of Great Britain in 1953 and Ireland in 1954. Unlike in Australia, however, strenuous efforts were made to stop the spread in Europe. These efforts were in vain. According to estimates, the wild rabbit population in the United Kingdom fell by 99%, in France by 90% to 95%, and in Spain by 95%. This in turn drove specialized rabbit predators, such as the Iberian lynx and the Spanish imperial eagle, to the brink of extinction.

Myxomatosis not only decreased the wild rabbit population and the population of its natural predators, but also had significant impact on the large rabbit farming industry, which produced domestic rabbits for meat and fur. As happened in Australia, the virus has generally become less virulent and the wild rabbit populations more resistant.

=== New Zealand ===
The introduction of myxomatosis into New Zealand in 1952 to control a burgeoning rabbit problem failed for lack of an arthropod vector. The common vector Spilopsyllus cuniculi is not present in New Zealand.

=== South America ===
Two pairs of European rabbits set free in 1936 at Punta Santa Maria resulted in an infestation that spread over the northern half of Tierra del Fuego. More rabbits were introduced in 1950 near Ushuaia by the Argentine Navy and a private rabbit farmer. The rabbits quickly became pests, riddling the ground with holes and leaving it bare of grass. By 1953 the rabbit population numbered about 30 million. In 1954 Chilean authorities introduced a Brazilian strain of myxoma virus to Tierra del Fuego, which succeeded in bringing rabbits to very low population levels.

== Use as an evolutionary model ==
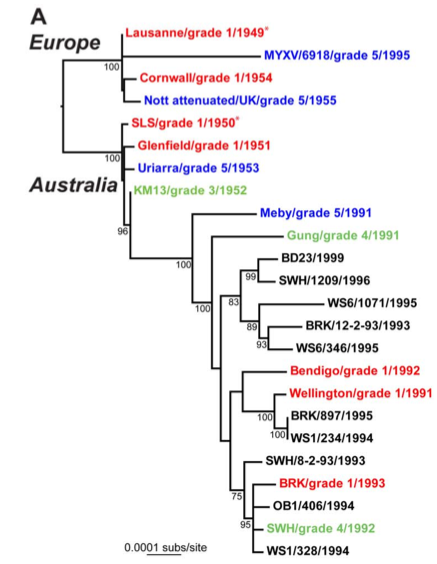
Evolutionary history of the myxoma virus in Europe and Australia

Given the importance of viral evolution to disease emergence, pathogenesis, drug resistance, and vaccine efficacy, the myxoma virus has been well studied by theoreticians and experimentalists. The introductions of myxoma virus into European rabbit populations in Australia and France created natural experiments in virulence evolution. While initial viral strains were highly virulent, attenuated strains were soon recovered from the field. These attenuated strains, which allowed rabbits to survive longer, came to dominate because they were more readily transmitted. As the complete genome sequences of multiple myxoma strains have been published, scientists have been able to pinpoint exactly which genes are responsible for the changes in the myxoma virus's virulence and behavior.

The evolution of myxomatosis has proved to be increasingly complex and unpredictable as both the virus and the host species change over time. In countries in which the virus has been introduced for control of feral rabbits, the hosts and the pathogens have continually adapted in various ways. While current strains of the myxoma virus in Australia are reduced in virulence, myxomatosis still provides significant rabbit control. For some recent strains of the virus, the reduction of inflammation in the host has resulted in prolonged viral replication and enhanced disease transmission. In turn, reduced suppression of the virus by the host's fever has led to immunosuppression and increased virulence.

== In culture ==
Myxomatosis is referred to as "the white blindness" in the novel Watership Down (1972) by Richard Adams. In this story a rabbit chief drives out all rabbits who seemed to be afflicted. In one of the novel's folk tales about the rabbit hero El-ahrairah, the transmission of the disease is explained to him by the lord of the rabbit underworld, the Black Rabbit of Inlé ("it is carried by the fleas in rabbits' ears; they pass from the ears of a sick rabbit to those of his companions").

In 2003, British rock band Radiohead released a song titled "Myxomatosis" as part of their sixth studio album, Hail to the Thief.
