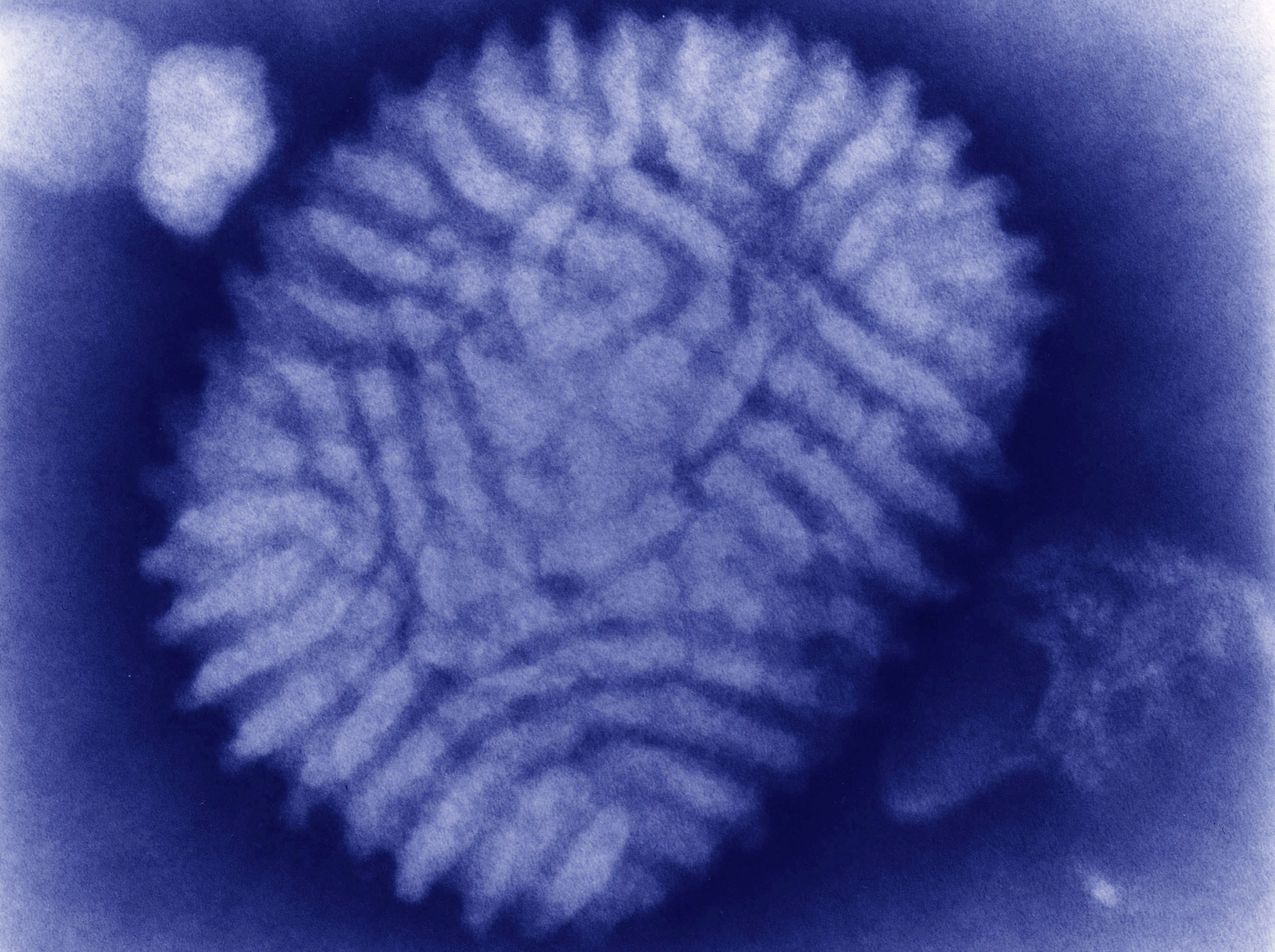
- Electron micrograph of Myxoma virus virion

Virus classification
- (unranked): Virus
- Realm: Varidnaviria
- Kingdom: Bamfordvirae
- Phylum: Nucleocytoviricota
- Class: Pokkesviricetes
- Order: Chitovirales
- Family: Poxviridae
- Genus: Leporipoxvirus
- Species: Leporipoxvirus myxoma

= Myxoma virus =

Species of virus

Myxoma virus is a poxvirus in the genus Leporipoxvirus. The two broad geographic types of Myxoma virus are Californian and South American. Californian myxoma virus is found on the West Coast of the United States, the Baja Peninsula of Mexico, and the southwest coast of Canada. South American or Brazilian myxoma virus is found in South and Central America. South American myxoma virus circulates in the jungle rabbit or tapeti (Sylvilagus brasiliensis), whereas Californian myxoma virus circulates in the brush rabbit (Sylvilagus bachmani). In their native hosts, the viruses cause the formation of benign cutaneous fibromas rather than systemic disease.

== Transmission ==
Myxoma virus is passively transmitted on the mouth parts of mosquitoes (such as Aedes aegypti) or fleas, and presumably other biting arthropods. It can also be spread through direct contact and contaminated fomites.

== Myxomatosis ==
Myxomatosis is the name of the lethal disseminated disease that occurs when European rabbits (Oryctolagus cuniculus) are infected with Myxoma virus; both the South and North American types are capable of causing this disease. Californian myxoma virus is particularly virulent, causing 100% mortality.

== Structure and genome ==
Virions are enveloped, and have a surface membrane with lateral bodies. The envelope contains host-derived lipids and self-synthesized glycolipids. They are brick-shaped and about 250 nanometers in diameter, 300 nm in length, and 200 nm in height. The middle contains a biconcave core that appears to be characteristic to many poxviruses.

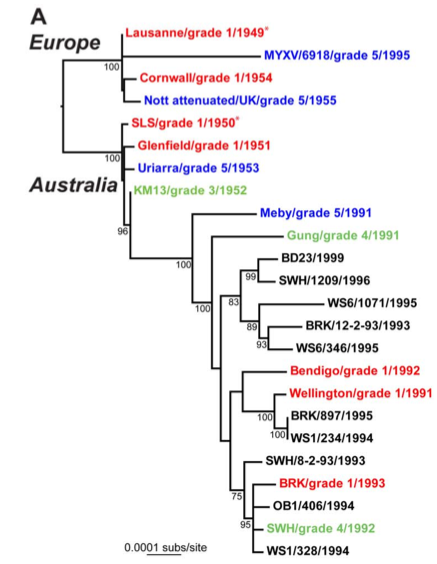
Evolution history of Myxoma virus

The genome is nonsegmented and contains a single molecule of linear, double-stranded DNA, 160,000 nucleotides in length. The genome has a G–C content around 40%, with terminally redundant sequences, which are repeated at both ends.

The genome encodes 170 open reading frames, 12 of which are duplicated in the terminal inverted repetitions.

== Infection and pathology ==
During their normal lifecycles, virions produce extracellular and intracellular proteins. The extracellular proteins are used primarily for suppressing or circumventing the host immune responses, hence are nonessential. Infection is also initiated by extracellular virions. Myxoma virus matures naturally by budding through the surface membrane of the host cell.

Myxoma virus has multiple methods that it uses to evade the immune system. One route of protection involves blocking the caspase activity within the host cells. The E13L viral protein is able to inhibit the caspases by binding to the CARD protein, which is part of the caspase-1-activating inflammasome complex. By binding, it is able to inhibit apoptosis, which is normally induced by the CARD protein. In addition, Myxoma virus uses the Serp-2 viral gene to inhibit a variety of other caspases. The Serp-2 gene is also capable of inhibiting granzyme B, a cysteine protease.

Myxoma virus is also capable of producing tumor necrosis factor receptor mimics to reduce the host's natural response to TNF. The M-T2 protein is a soluble receptor that mimics the TNF receptors within rabbits.

Most rabbit and hare hosts are susceptible to the virus, which means the virus can effectively evade the host immunity, but susceptibility is not the primary indicator for symptomatic infection or pathology. A distinction must be made between susceptibility and permissibility, in which only the latter must be true before the virus is able to replicate in the cell and cause pathologies. This is the reason Myxoma virus is very species-specific; it is able to circumvent a certain species of rabbit's immune response, but is unable to do so for any other species. The virus is able to get into the cells of many different species, though, including human, mouse, and monkey, which is generally useless if it is unable to replicate and avoid the immune system.

In 1993, the Australian government approved a modification of Myxoma virus that would introduce genetic code into rabbit sperm and egg proteins. This mutation would induce an autoimmune response and inhibit fertility. This immunocontraceptive vaccine was under research in the 2000s as a way to control wild rabbit populations through fertility instead of mortality.

== Research ==
Myxoma virus has become of interest in human medicine because some of its proteins have strong immunosuppressive effects, and several of its virus-encoded immunomodulators are being developed to treat systemic inflammatory syndromes in people such as cardiovascular disease. Myxoma virus also can infect many types of human cancer cells, which is being used to develop it as a virotherapeutic agent for virotherapy.
