= Isla San José (Baja California Sur) =

Island off the coast of the Baja California Peninsula

Coordinates: 24°58′27″N 110°36′52″W

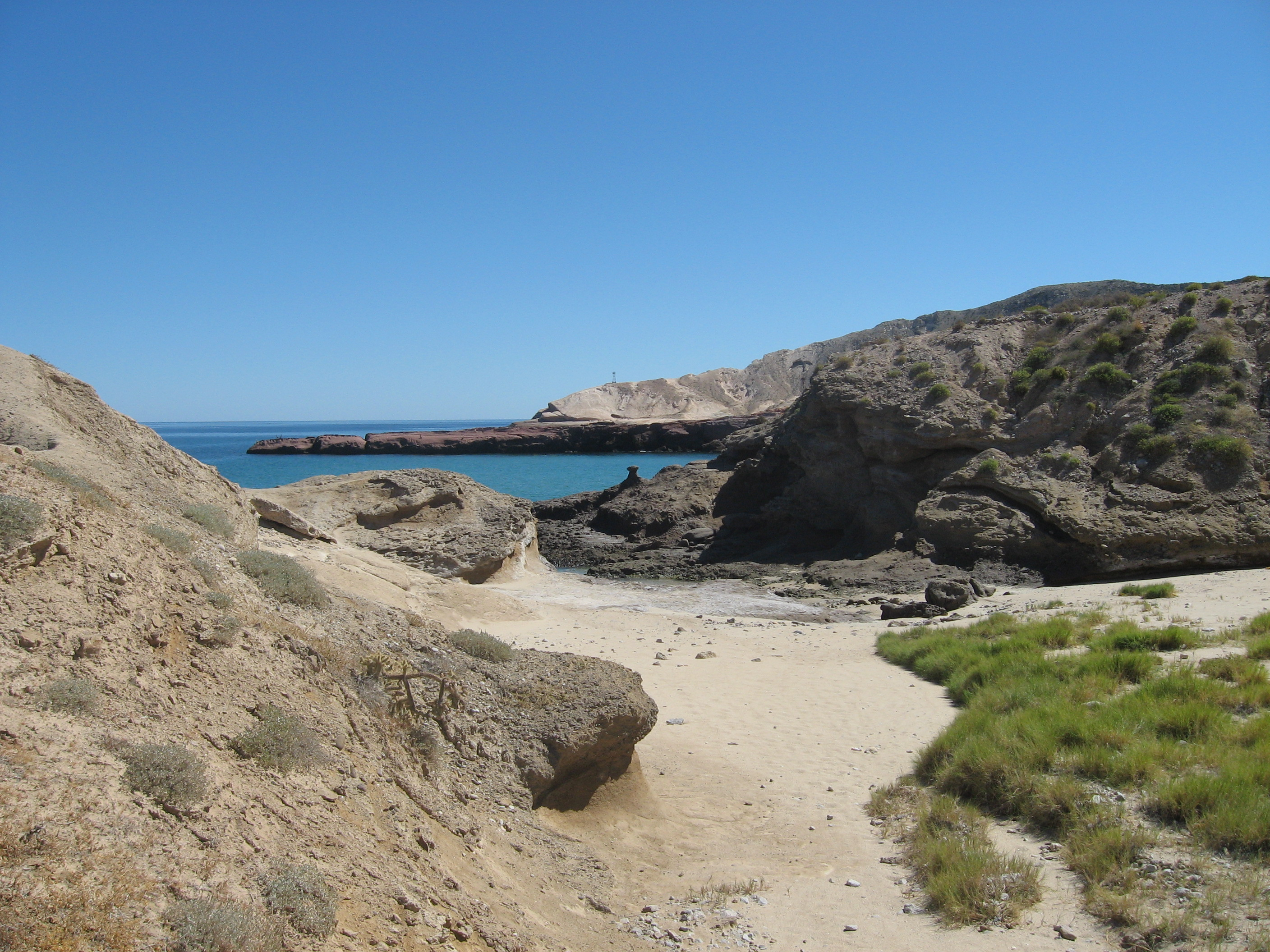
Isla San José

Isla San José is a semi-arid island in the Gulf of California, off the east coast of the Baja California peninsula. Located some 60 km (37 mi) north of the city of La Paz, it belongs politically to the Mexican state of Baja California Sur and is part of the Municipality of La Paz. Its surface area is 182.962 km^{2} (70.642 sq mi), the sixth-largest island in Mexico. The island is also referred to as San José Island in English, though there are other islands by this name.

It is the type locality for the yellow-footed gull and the San José brush rabbit.
