= Lumpi-ProVacInd =

Cattle vaccine

Lumpi-ProVacInd is a live attenuated vaccine for cattle. It was developed by a team of scientists led by Dr. Naveen Kumar, principal scientist at National Centre for Veterinary Type Cultures (NCVTC) National Research Centre on Equines (NRCE), Hisar, in collaboration with Indian Veterinary Research Institute, Izzatnagar, both under the Indian Council of Agricultural Research for prevention of Lumpy skin disease outbreak in India. It was launched by Prime Minister Narendra Modi and Agriculture Minister Narendra Singh Tomar.

According to Press Information Bureau, studies have shown the vaccine to be 100% effective in preventing LSD infection, which complies with all government vaccine standards. It was developed by using a local (Indian) LSD virus strain isolated by Dr Naveen in 2019 from outbreak in Ranchi, Jharkhand. The Neethling strain based LSD vaccines which is used in most part of the world has some side effects which include local inflammation at the site of injection, fever and a temporary reduction in milk yield in up to 15% animals. In contrast, the Ranchi strain based vaccine (Lumpi-ProVac^{Ind}) has no side effects; thereby it has high export potential-aiding to the make-in-India campaign. This vaccine has been commercialized and the technology has been transferred to at least 4 vaccine manufacturers in India which include, Biovet Pvt Ltd , Bengaluru, Hester Biosciences, Ahmedabad, Indian Immunological Ltd , Hyderabad and Institute of Veterinary Biological Products, Pune.

In 2024, the Central Drugs Standard Control Organization (CDSCO), Govt. of India, has approved the commercial production of Lumpi-ProVacInd by Biovet Pvt Ltd, Bengaluru.

Previously, in 2021, India authorized a goatpox (heterologous) vaccine against LSDV in cattle. However, later, experimental trials and several pieces of evidence from the field suggested that the goatpox vaccine (Uttarkashi strain) does not provide any significant protection against LSD in cattle.
