= Naira (disambiguation) =

The naira is the currency of Nigeria.

Naira may also refer to:

- eNaira, a digital currency issued by the Central Bank of Nigeria
- Naira (fly), a genus of flies
- Naira (given name), a feminine given name
- Naira, Srikakulam district, a village in Andhra Pradesh, India

== See also ==
- NYRA (disambiguation)
- Naira Power, a 1982 novel by Buchi Emecheta
- Paraid Naira, a mountain of the Silvretta Alps
