= LSDV =

LSDV may refer to:

- League of Social Democrats of Vojvodina, in Serbia
- Lumpy skin disease virus
