= Acharya N. G. Ranga Agricultural University =

Agricultural university in Andhra Pradesh, India

- Type: Public
- Established: 12 June 1964; 62 years ago
- Affiliations: UGC
- Chancellor: Governor of Andhra Pradesh
- Vice-Chancellor: Dr. P. V. Satyanarayana
- Location: Guntur, Andhra Pradesh, India; 16.3610668°N 80.4347525°E
- Campus: Urban
- Former name: Andhra Pradesh Agricultural University
- Website: angrau.ac.in

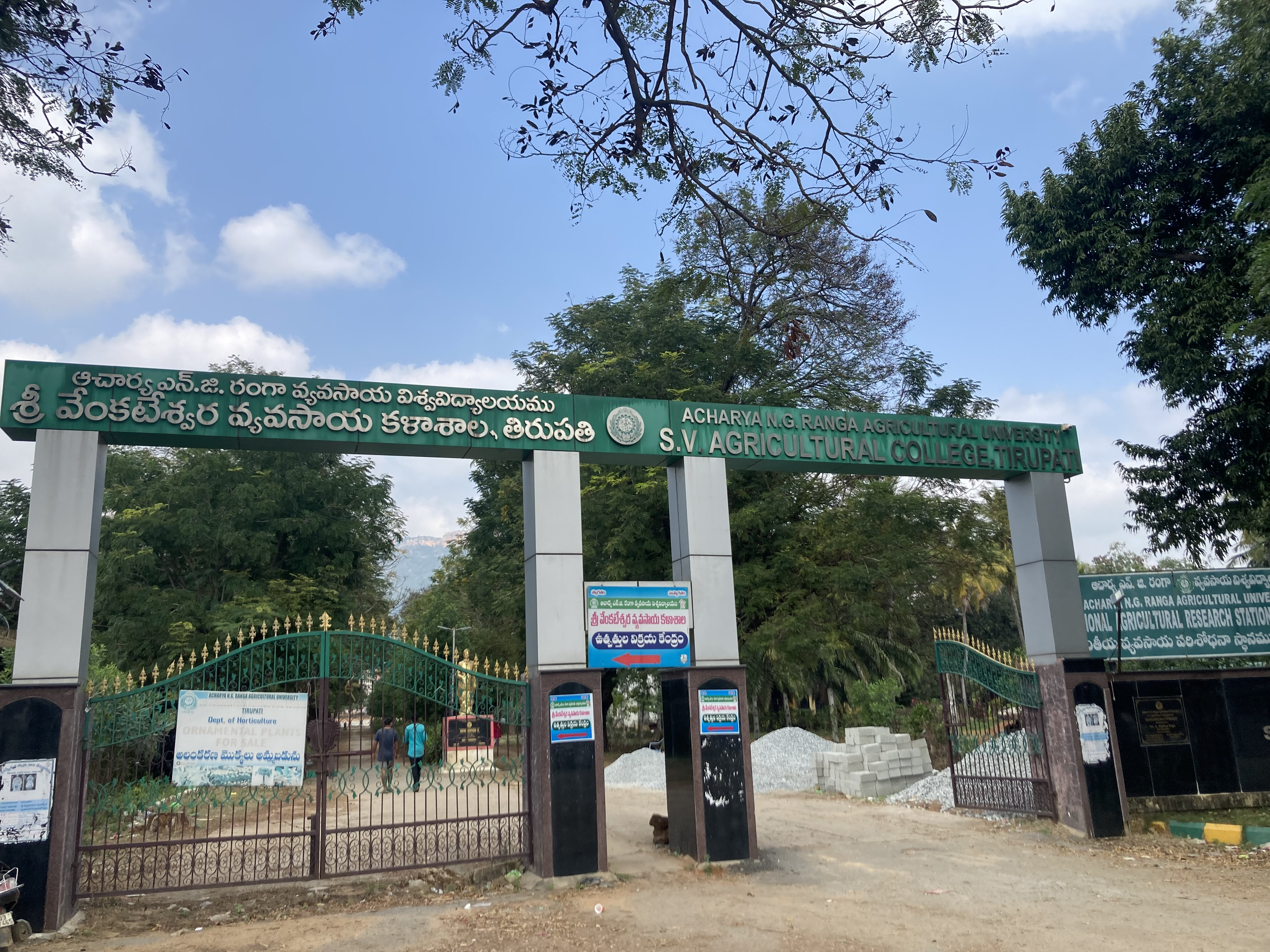
Acharya N. G. Ranga Agricultural University

Acharya N. G. Ranga Agricultural University (ANGRAU) is a public agricultural university with its headquarters at the village Lam, Guntur, Andhra Pradesh, India.

== History ==
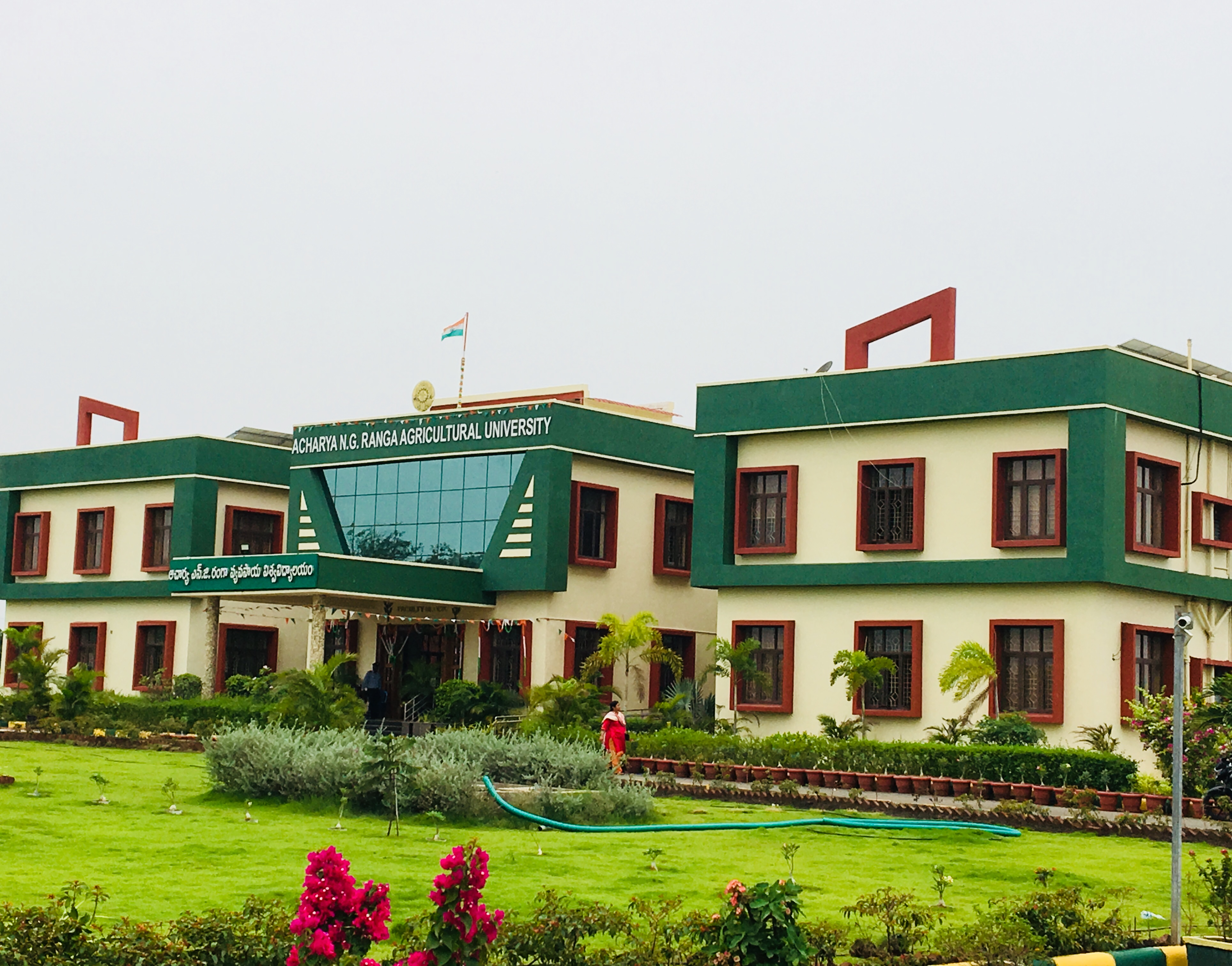
University Campus at Guntur district

The original Andhra Pradesh Agricultural University was established on 12 June 1964 through the APAU Act 1963 with O. Pulla Reddy as the first vice-chancellor. It was formally inaugurated on 20 March 1965, by Lal Bahadur Shastri, the then Prime Minister of India in Hyderabad. On 23 June 1966, another milestone was the inauguration of the building program of the university by Indira Gandhi, the then Prime Minister of India. Later, it was renamed as Acharya N. G. Ranga Agricultural University on 7 November 1996. Those institutions that were located in the residuary state of Andhra Pradesh were then grouped under a new university with the same name as Acharya N G Ranga Agricultural University was established in Guntur.

Based on the recommendation of the committee and approval by the Competent Authority of ICAR (Indian Council of Agricultural Research), the ranking Status of Acharya N G Ranga Agricultural University for the year 2017-18 is 27 while the Acharya Jai Shankar Agricultural University is ranked at 12.

According to the Andhra Pradesh Agricultural University Act, 1963, Colleges of Agriculture and Veterinary Science, Hyderabad (affiliated to Osmania University), Agricultural College, Bapatla (affiliated with Andhra University), Sri Venkateswara Agricultural College and Andhra Veterinary College, Tirupati (affiliated to Sri Venkateswara University) were transferred to the new university in June 1964. About 41 agricultural research stations and four research stations were transferred to the university in July 1966 and May 1967, respectively.

== Colleges ==
The university has 11 colleges:

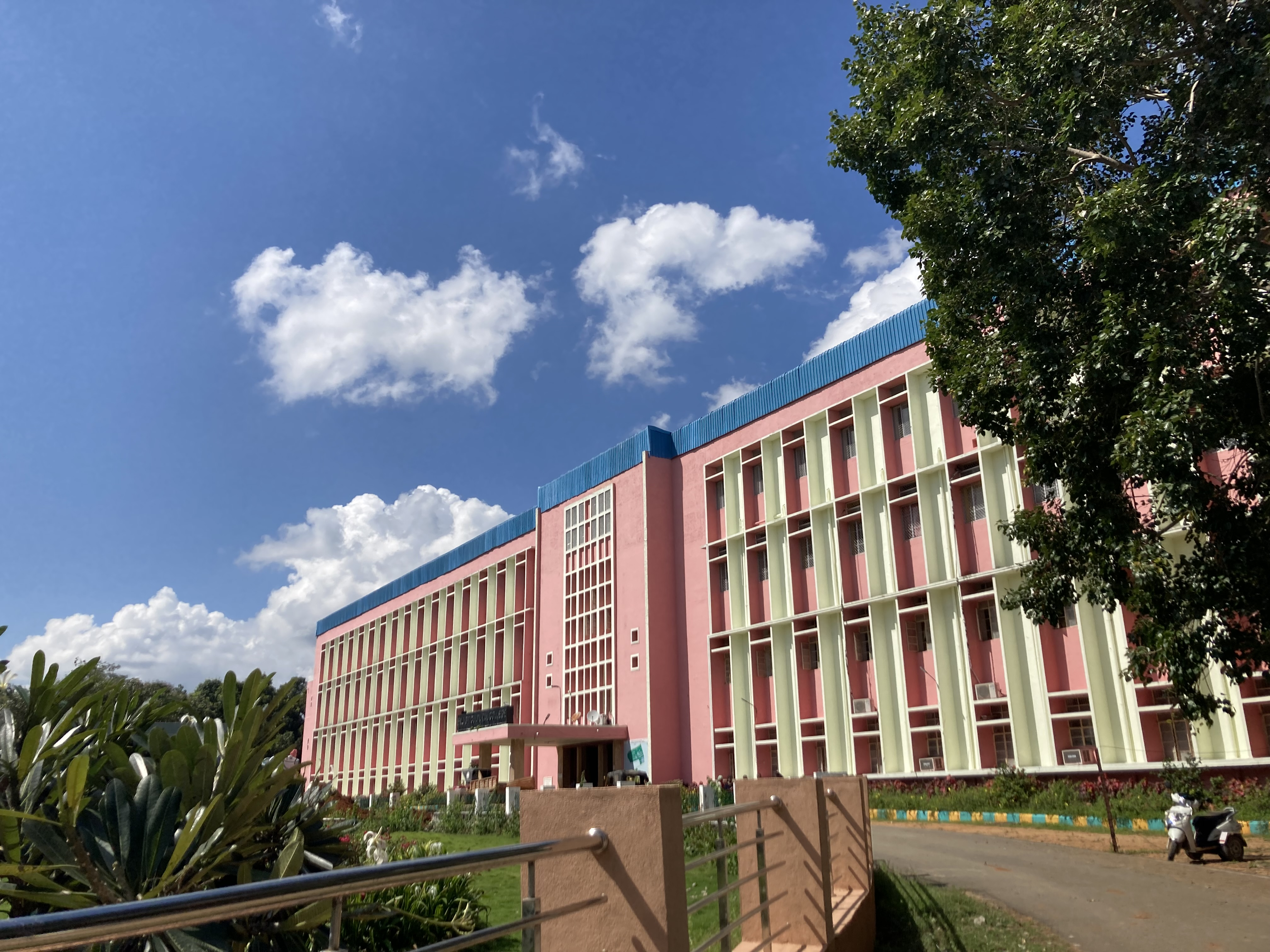
S. V. Agricultural College, Tirupati

- Faculty of Agriculture
  - Agricultural College, Bapatla, Guntur district, established 1945
  - S.V. Agricultural College, Tirupati, Chittoor district, established 1961
  - Agricultural College, Naira, Srikakulam district, established 1989
  - Agricultural College, Mahanandi, Nandyal district, established 1991
  - College of Agriculture, Rajahmundry, East Godavari district, established 2008
- Faculty of Community Science
  - College of Community Science, Lam, Guntur district, established 2013
- Faculty of Agricultural Engineering & Technology
  - Dr. NTR College of Agricultural Engineering, Bapatla, Guntur district, established 1983
  - College of Agricultural Engineering, Madakasira, Anantapur district, established 2008
  - Dr. NTR College of Food Science & Technology, Bapatla, Guntur district, established 2003
  - College of Food Science & Technology, Pulivendula, Kadapa district, established 2008
- Advanced Post Graduate Centre
  - Advance Post Graduate Centre, Lam, Guntur, established 2013,
- Faculty of Diploma in Agricultural Engineering
  - Polytechnic of Agricultural Engineering, Kalikiri, Chittoor district 2013
  - Polytechnic of Agricultural Engineering, Anakapalle, Vishakapatnam district 2013

== Rankings ==
The university was ranked 26th in India by the NIRF (National Institutional Ranking Framework) in the Agriculture ranking and 151-200 overall in 2024.

== Vice Chancellors ==
1. A. Padma Raju (2016)
2. T. Vijay Kumar (i/c)
3. B. Rajsekhar (i/c)
4. A. Akshay Kumar (i/c)
5. V. Damodara Naidu
6. Y. Madhusudhan Reddy (i/c)
7. A. Vishnu Vardhana Reddy
8. R. Sarada Jayalakshmi
9. P.V. Sathyanarayana (2026- Till date)

== Publications ==
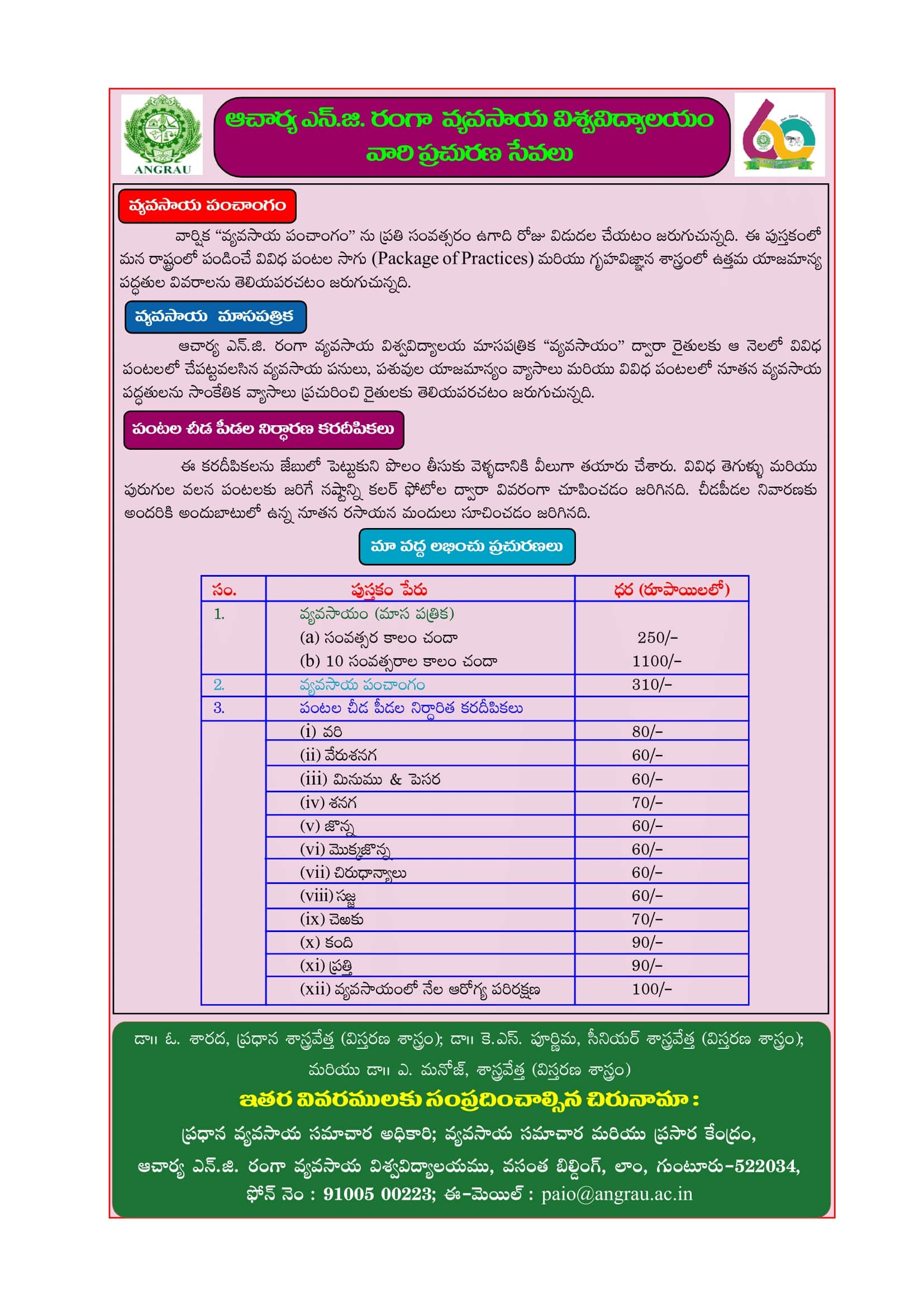
University Publications

The university publishes The Journal of Research ANGRAU, a quarterly journal.

SUBSCRIPTIONS TARIFF PLAN FOR THE JOURNAL OF RESEARCH ANGRAU

INDIVIDUAL(ANNUAL) : Rs.750/-

INSTITUTE (ANNUAL) : Rs.3000/-

INDIVIDUAL (LIFE) for 10 years : Rs.3000/-

PRINTING CHARGES : Rs. 150/- per page

The university publishes Vyavasaya Panchangam, a yearly Book. SALE FOR FARMES & OTHERS

INDIVIDUAL (BOOK) : Rs.310/- (OFFLINE)

The university publishes Vyavasayam, a Monthly Magazine .

SUBSCRIPTIONS TARIFF PLAN FOR THE VYAVASAYAM MONTHLY MAGAZINE

INDIVIDUAL(ANNUAL) : Rs.250/-

INDIVIDUAL (LIFE) for the 10 Year : Rs. 1100/-

The university publishes Crop Diagnostics Bulletins , a Books .

SALE TARIFF FOR THE CROP DIAGNOSTICS BULLETINS

PADDY (వరి) : Rs.80/-

Ground Nut (వేరుశనగ) : Rs.60/-

Black & Green Gram (మినుము & పెసర) : Rs. 60/-

Bengal Gram (శెనగ) : Rs. 70/-

Jawar (జొన్న) : Rs.60/-

Maize (మొక్కజొన్న) : Rs.60/-

Millets (చిరుధాన్యాలు) : Rs.60/-

Bajra (సజ్జ) : Rs.60/-

Sugarcane (చెరకు) : Rs.70/-

Red Gram (కంది) : Rs.90/-

Cotton (ప్రత్తి) : Rs.90/-

Soil Health Management in Agriculture (వ్యవసాయంలో నేల ఆరోగ్య పరిరక్షణ) : Rs.100/-

== Notable alumni ==
- Challa Sreenivasulu Setty, chairman of the State Bank of India
- Kanneboyina Nagaraju, Professor, Binghamton University, USA (graduate from College of Veterinary Sciences, Tirupati, 1986)
- Marri Shashidhar Reddy, former MLA (Telangana)
- Jetti A. Oliver, Chancellor of Sam Higginbottom University of Agriculture, Technology and Sciences
