= B Dayakar Rao =

Indian Agricultural Economics scientist (born 1963)

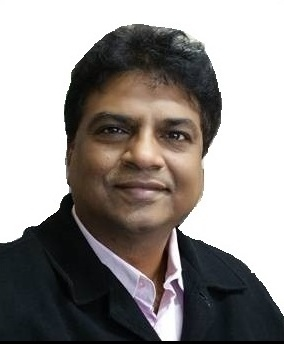
- Born: 15 May 1963 (age 63); Warangal District, Telangana, India
- Occupations: Principal Scientist, Indian Institute of Millets Research
- Years active: Since 1992
- Known for: Millets research, Economics & Value Addition
- Website: http://www.millets.res.in/sstaff/DrDayakarRaoB.php

B Dayakar Rao is an Indian Agricultural Economics scientist, who works as Principal Scientist at the Indian Institute of Millets Research.

== Biography ==
Rao was born in Warangal. He obtained both his Bachelors and master's degree (Agri. Economics) from PJTSAU, Hyderabad and obtained a PhD (1991) from NDRI, Karnal. He worked briefly at the Indian Institute of Horticultural Research Institute (IIHR), Bangalore, where he worked on Betel vine, before he joined IIMR, Rajendranagar, Hyderabad in 1993.

== Awards and honours ==
Rao is a Fellow of National fellow of Dairy sciences. He has received the Innovative Scientist National Award under SIRIDHANYA: Millets Awards 2018 at the International Trade Fair on Organics and Millets He was honoured for his contributions towards the development of millet value chains, value added products and entrepreneurship development and Best Food Processor Award by FICCI, Hyderabad in 2014. He is known for his value added aspects for creation of Ready to eat/cook (RTE/C) products from millets so as to transform the idea of millets being a poor man's crop in the consumer's mind. He has more than 50 publications in national and international journals and author of 12 book/book chapters. He holds the position as PI of NAIF-ABI project and PI of Centre of Excellence on Sorghum processing and Value addition under NFSM sponsored by DAC, GoI.

== See also ==
- Acharya N. G. Ranga Agricultural University
- Indian Council of Agricultural Research
