= G. Taru Sharma =

Indian biologist (born 1965)

- Born: 4 August 1965 (age 61); Mathura, Uttar Pradesh, India
- Education: St. Mary's Convent School, Mhow; Kishori Raman Girls College, Mathura; Agra College; Indian Veterinary Research Institute; University of Louisiana
- Known for: Studies on germ cell marker genes
- Awards: 1993 SAPI Young Scientist Gold Medal; 1994 ISCA Young Scientists Merit Certificate; 2001 ISSAR Prof. Nils Lagerlof Memorial Award; 2002 IVRI Award; 2003 ISIWCD WEAL Award (WEAL) 2004 ICAR Panjab Rao Deshmukh Award; 2006 N-BIOS Prize; 2011 GoUP Award of Honor; 2011 IVRI Best Teacher Award; 2012 SAPI Dr. A. Roy Memorial Award; 2013 IGO Research Excellence Award; 2016 ISSRF Labhsetwar Award; 2016 ICAR Bharat Ratna Dr. C. Subramaniam Award; 2019-ICAR-Rafi A.Kidwai Award for her outstanding research Contributions.
- Scientific career
- Fields: Molecular reproductive physiology; Stem cell biology
- Workplaces: National Dairy Development Board; Indian Veterinary Research Institute

G. Taru Sharma (born 4 August 1965) is an Indian biologist and the head of the physiology and climatology division at the Indian Veterinary Research Institute of the Indian Council of Agricultural Research. Known for her studies on germ cell marker genes, Sharma is an elected fellow of the National Academy of Agricultural Sciences and National Academy of Sciences (NASI). The Department of Biotechnology of the Government of India awarded her the National Bioscience Award for Career Development, one of the highest Indian science awards, for her contributions to biosciences in 2006.

== Biography ==
G. Taru Sharma, born on 4 August 1965 at the heritage city of Mathura in the Indian state of Uttar Pradesh, did her early schooling at the St. Mary's Convent School, Mhow and her college studies at the Kishori Raman Girls College in Mathura and Agra College in Agra. Her doctoral research was at the Indian Veterinary Research Institute (IVRI) and after securing a PhD in 1990, she did her post-doctoral work as a research scientist at the Centre for Biotechnology of the National Dairy Development Board. In 1991, she joined the Central Institute for Research on Goats of the Indian Council of Agricultural Research (ICAR) but moved to the IVRI, another ICAR institution, in 2000. She has been with the institute since then, serving as a senior scientist or a principal scientist and holds the position of the director and head of CAFT in Veterinary Physiology since 2009. She also heads the physiology and climatology division of the institute. In between, she had a short stint in the US at the Reproductive Biotechnology Laboratory of the University of Louisiana as a fellow of the Food and Agriculture Organization and a visiting scientist in 1999.

== Legacy ==
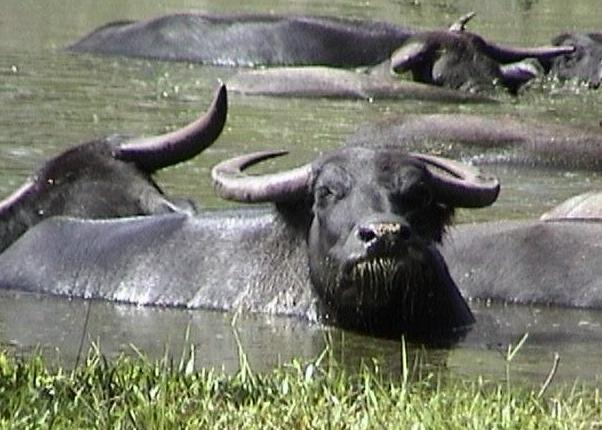
Water buffalo

Sharma's core areas of research have been in the fields of molecular reproductive physiology, oocyte and embryo genomics as well as stem cell biology. She has undertaken and led several projects including the project on Stem cells: its biology and therapeutic application in livestock and pets, a flagship program of IVRI. She is known to have done extended studies on early pregnancy detection in water buffaloes, and has developed various techniques for oocyte recovery, somatic cell development and immuno-histochemical localization of the proteins. Some of the research findings were later brought out as a book, Nitric oxide and ovarian folliculogenesis: A study of follicular development in water buffalo (Bubalis bubalus). Her studies have been documented by way of a number of articles (Note: Please see Selected bibliography section) and ResearchGate, an online repository of scientific articles has listed 130 of them. Besides, she is the author of twenty manuals as well as three books and has contributed chapters to books published by others. She also holds two patents for processes developed by her and has guided several post-graduate and doctoral scholars in their studies.

Sharma has been a member of the editorial board of the Reproductive Health and Medicine of the ISSRF and presides the Animal Physiologists Association (APA). She is a life member of organizations such as the Society of Animal Physiologists of India, the Physiological Society of India, the Society of Veterinary Physiologists, and Biochemists of India and the Indian Science Congress Association. Life member of ISSRF, Indian Society of Veterinary Immunologists and Biotechnologists.

== Awards and honors ==
Taru Sharma received two young scientist honors early in her career; the Young Scientist Gold Medal of the Society of Animal Physiologists of India in 1993 and the Young Scientists Merit Certificate of the Indian Science Congress Association in 1994. The Indian Society for the Study of Animal Reproduction chose her for the Prof. Nils Lagerlof Memorial Award in 2001 and she received the Award of Honor of the IVRI in 2002. The Indian Society for Integrated Women and Child Development (ISIWCD) selected her for the Livelihood Award (WEAL) at the World Women Summit of 2003 and the Indian Council of Agricultural Research honored her with the Panjab Rao Deshmukh Women Agricultural Scientist Award in 2004.The Department of Biotechnology of the Government of India awarded her the National Bioscience Award for Career Development, one of the highest Indian science awards in 2006 and the Government of Uttar Pradesh honored her services in the therapeutics of canine clinical cases with an Award of Honor in 2011; the same year as she received the Best Teacher Award of the IVRI. The Society of Animal Physiologists of India honored her again in 2012 with the Dr. A. Roy Memorial Award and she was selected for the Research Excellence Award of the Indus Global Organization the next year. In 2016, she received two awards, the Labhsetwar Award of the Indian Society for the study of Reproduction and Fertility and the Bharat Ratna Dr. C. Subramaniam Award for Outstanding Teachers of the ICAR. Became NAAS fellow from 1.1.2017. Became SAPI fellow during the year 2018. G.P.Talwar gold medal award for 2019. Rafi Ahmed Kidwai award for outstanding research by Indian Council of Agriculture Research in 2019.Elected as Fellow NASI in 2019. Executive member of NAAS from 2021.

== Selected bibliography ==
=== Books ===
- Dubey, Pawan K.; Tripathi, Anima; Sharma, G. Taru (2013). Nitric oxide and ovarian folliculogenesis: A study of follicular development in water buffalo (Bubalis bubalus). LAP LAMBERT Academic Publishing. ISBN 978-3659333187.

=== Articles ===
- Nath, Amar; Sharma, Veena; Dubey, Pawan K.; D, Pratheesh M.; Gade, Nitin E.; Saikumar, G.; Sharma, G. Taru (1 January 2013). "Impact of gonadotropin supplementation on the expression of germ cell marker genes (MATER, ZAR1, GDF9, and BMP15) during in vitro maturation of buffalo (Bubalus bubalis) oocyte". In Vitro Cellular & Developmental Biology - Animal. 49 (1): 34–41. doi:10.1007/s11626-012-9561-5. ISSN 1071-2690. PMID 23263936. S2CID 17225376.
- Udehiya, Rahul Kumar; Amarpal; Aithal, H.P.; Kinjavdekar, P.; Pawde, A.M.; Singh, Rajendra; Sharma, G. Taru (2013). "Comparison of autogenic and allogenic bone marrow derived mesenchymal stem cells for repair of segmental bone defects in rabbits". Research in Veterinary Science. 94 (3): 743–752. doi:10.1016/j.rvsc.2013.01.011. PMID 23414969.

== See also ==
- Folliculogenesis
- Mesenchymal stem cell
- Animal physiology
