= Goat pox =

Goatpox virus

Virus classification
- (unranked): Virus
- Realm: Varidnaviria
- Kingdom: Bamfordvirae
- Phylum: Nucleocytoviricota
- Class: Pokkesviricetes
- Order: Chitovirales
- Family: Poxviridae
- Genus: Capripoxvirus
- Species: Capripoxvirus goatpox

Synonyms
- Variola caprina

Infectious disease caused by the goatpox virus

Goat pox or goatpox is a contagious viral disease caused by Goatpox virus, a pox virus that affects goats. The virus usually spreads via the respiratory system, and sometimes spreads through abraded skin. It is most likely to occur in crowded stock. Sources of the virus include cutaneous lesions, saliva, nasal secretions and faeces. There are two types of the disease: the papulo-vesicular form and the nodular form (stone pox). The incubation period is usually 8–13 days, but it may be as short as four days.

It is thought the same virus spreads sheep pox, to which European sheep breeds are highly susceptible. The virus may be present in dried scabs for up to six months.

In endemic areas the morbidity rate is 70–90% and the mortality rate is 5–10%. The mortality rate may reach nearly 100% in imported animals. Resistant animals may show only a mild form of the disease, which may be missed as only a few lesions are present, usually around the ears or the tail.

== Spread ==
Goat pox is found in the part of Africa north of the equator, the Middle East, Central Asia and India. It may be spread between animals by:

- Direct contact
- Indirect transmission by contaminated implements, vehicles or products such as litter or fodder
- Indirect transmission by insects (mechanical vectors).
- Contamination by inhalation, intradermal or subcutaneous inoculation, or by respiratory, transcutaneous and transmucosal routes

== Clinical signs ==
- Initial rapid onset of fever, salivation, nasal discharge and conjunctivitis
- Eruption of skin lesions after a few days. These lesions first develop into vesicles, pustules and then hairy and dark-colored scabs. They may take up to 6 weeks to heal. Scabs are often found in hair-free or wool-free areas such as the udders, perineum, inguinal area, scrotum, muzzle, eyelids and axillae.
- Appearance on udders and teats of small, red spotty areas which may form scabs. The orifices of the teats may become infected and cause mastitis.
- Sensitivity in affected skin
- Internal lesions in the lungs causing respiratory distress
- Depression
- Polypnoea
- Oedema of eyelids, photophobia, Rhinitis and lacrimation
- Development of nodules in the lungs causing bronchopneumonia
- Anorexia

=== Papulo-vesicular form ===
- Papules become a white-grey colour, desiccate and form crusts that are easy to remove
- Papules are 0.5–1.5 cm in diameter and are hard to the touch. The papules become depressed, gray and necrotic, and may be surrounded by an area of hyperemia.
- Rarely, papules may transform into large, fluid-filled vesicles. After the vesicles rupture, a thick crust covers the lesions

=== Nodular form ===
- Papules give rise to nodules involving all the layers of the skin and the subcutaneous tissue.
- Necrosis and sloughing of the nodules leaves a hairless scar.

=== Secondary problems ===
- Septicaemia
- Abortion (rare)
- Infections
- Fly strike
- Digestive localisation
