= Sri Venkateswara Veterinary University =

State university in Andhra Pradesh, India

- Former names: College of Veterinary Sciences, Bapatla; College of Veterinary Sciences, Tirupati
- Type: Public
- Established: 2005; 21 years ago
- Affiliations: UGC
- Chancellor: Governor of Andhra Pradesh
- Vice-Chancellor: Dr. J. V. Ramana (I/C)
- Location: Tirupati, Andhra Pradesh, India; 13°37′42″N 79°23′16″E
- Website: svvu.edu.in

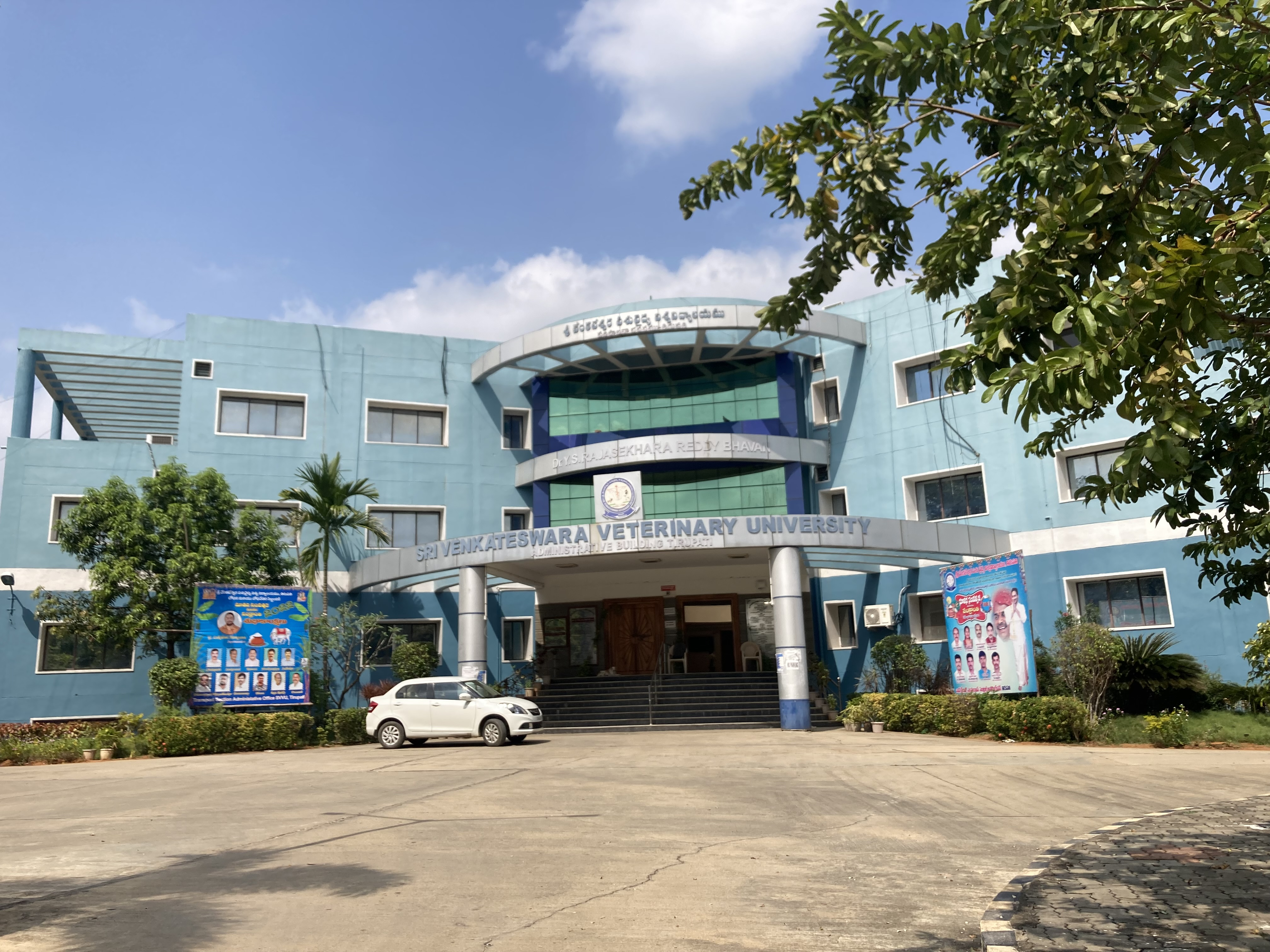
S V Veterinary University Admin Building

Sri Venkateswara Veterinary University (SVVU) is a state university located at Tirupati, Tirupati district, Andhra Pradesh, India. It was established in 2005 by the Government of Andhra Pradesh and focuses on veterinary studies.

== History ==
Sri Venkateswara Veterinary University marks its beginning with the establishment of the College of Veterinary Science in Bapatla in 1955, which was shifted to Tirupati in 1957.

During the golden jubilee celebrations of the college in September 2004, the then Chief Minister of Andhra Pradesh announced the establishment of the university. This took form with the Sri Venkateswara Veterinary University Act, 2005, which was passed on 30 March 2005. The university was officially inaugurated by Y. S. Rajasekhar Reddy in the premises of the college on 15 July 2005. The university took control of the operations of the faculty of Veterinary Science from Acharya N.G. Ranga Agricultural University.

=== Vice-chancellor ===
Former vice-chancellors (VC) of the university, with the day they assumed charge:

- Priyadarshi Dash: 5 August 2005 (special officer)
- Manmohan Singh: 25 May 2006 as special officer, 15 September 2006 as VC, 12 November 2007 as VC in-charge.
- D.V.G. Krishna Mohan: 14 April 2008
- Md. Hafeez: 12 January 2010 (in-charge)
- V. Prabhakar Rao: 27 October 2010
- Manmohan Singh: 31 October 2013
- Y. Hari Babu: 17 April 2017
- Poonam Malakondaiah: 17 April 2017 (in-charge)
- Velugoti Padmanabha Reddy: 5 August 2020

== Notable alumni ==
- Kanneboyina Nagaraju, Professor, Binghamton University

== Rankings ==
The university was ranked 33rd in India by the NIRF (National Institutional Ranking Framework) in the agriculture ranking in 2024.
