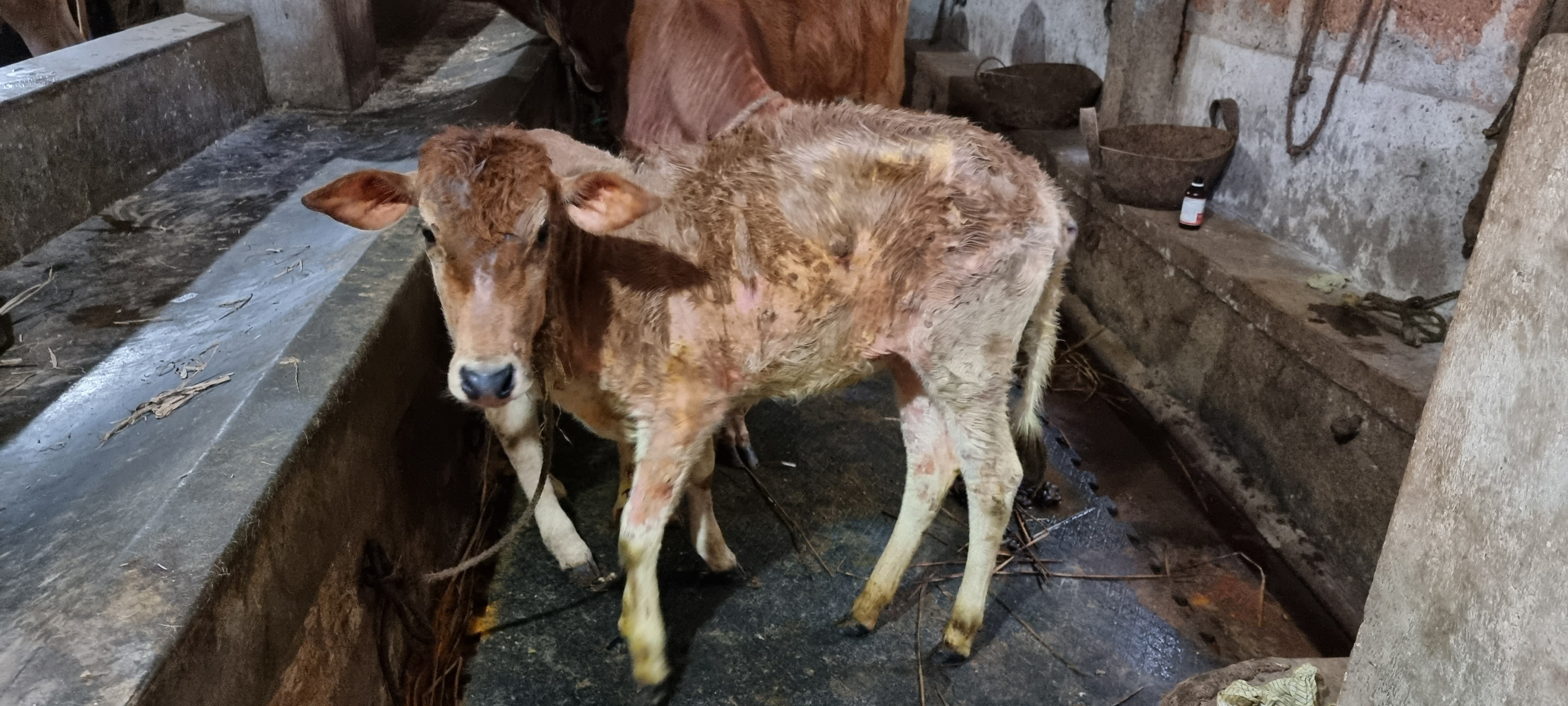
- Cattle affected by lumpy skin disease

Virus classification
- (unranked): Virus
- Realm: Varidnaviria
- Kingdom: Bamfordvirae
- Phylum: Nucleocytoviricota
- Class: Pokkesviricetes
- Order: Chitovirales
- Family: Poxviridae
- Genus: Capripoxvirus
- Species: Capripoxvirus lumpyskinpox

= Lumpy skin disease =

Lumpy skin disease virus

Viral disease affecting cows

Lumpy skin disease (LSD) is an infectious disease in cattle caused by Lumpy skin disease virus of the family Poxviridae, also known as Neethling virus. The disease is characterized by fever, enlarged superficial lymph nodes, and multiple nodules (measuring 2–5 centimetres (1–2 in) in diameter) on the skin and mucous membranes, including those of the respiratory and gastrointestinal tracts. Infected cattle may also develop edematous swelling in their limbs and exhibit lameness. The virus has important economic implications since affected animals tend to have permanent damage to their skin, lowering the commercial value of their hide. Additionally, the disease often results in chronic debility, reduced milk production, poor growth, infertility, abortion, and sometimes death.

Onset of fever occurs almost a week after infection by the virus. This initial fever may exceed 41 °C (106 °F) and persist for a week. At this time all of the superficial lymph nodes become enlarged. The nodules, which characterize the disease, appear seven to nineteen days after virus inoculation. Coinciding with the appearance of the nodules, discharge from the eyes and nose becomes mucopurulent.

The nodular lesions involve the dermis and the epidermis, but may extend to the underlying subcutis or even to the muscle. These lesions, occurring all over the body (but particularly on the head, neck, udder, scrotum, vulva, and perineum), may be either well-circumscribed or they may coalesce. Cutaneous lesions may be resolved rapidly or may persist as hard lumps. The lesions may also become sequestrated, leaving deep ulcers filled with granulation tissue and often suppurating (forming pus). At the initial onset of the nodules, they have a creamy grey to white color upon cut section and may exude serum. After about two weeks a cone-shaped central core of necrotic material may appear within the nodules. In addition the nodules on the mucous membranes of the eyes, nose, mouth, rectum, udder and genitalia quickly ulcerate, aiding transmission of the virus.

In mild cases of LSD the clinical symptoms and lesions are often confused with Bovine Herpesvirus 2 (BHV-2), which is referred to as pseudo-lumpy skin disease. However the lesions associated with BHV-2 infections are more superficial. BHV-2 also has a shorter course and is milder than LSD. Electron microscopy can be used to differentiate between the two infections. BHV-2 is characterized by intranuclear inclusion bodies as opposed to the intracytoplasmic inclusions characteristic of LSD. Isolation of BHV-2, or its detection in negatively stained biopsy specimens, is not possible until approximately a week after the development of skin lesions.

== Lumpy skin disease virus ==
=== Classification ===
Lumpy skin disease virus (LSDV) is double-stranded DNA virus. It is a member of the capripoxvirus genus of Poxviridae. Capripoxviruses (CaPVs) represent one of eight genera within the Chordopoxvirus (ChPV) subfamily. The capripoxvirus genus consists of LSDV, as well as sheeppox virus, and goatpox virus. CaPV infections are usually host-specific within specific geographic distributions even though they are serologically indistinguishable from one another.

=== Structure ===
Brick-like structure typical of Poxviridae viruses

Like other viruses in the Poxviridae family, capripoxviruses are brick-shaped. Capripoxvirus virions are different than orthopoxvirus virions in that they have a more oval profile, as well as larger lateral bodies. The average size of capripoxvirions is 320 nm by 260 nm.

=== Genome ===
The virus has a 151-kbp genome, consisting of a central coding region which is bounded by identical 2.4 kbp-inverted terminal repeats and contains 156 genes. There are 146 conserved genes when comparing LSDV with chordopoxviruses of other genera. These genes encode proteins which are involved in transcription and mRNA biogenesis, nucleotide metabolism, DNA replication, protein processing, virion structure and assembly, and viral virulence and host range. Within the central genomic region, LSDV genes share a high degree of collinearity and amino acid identity with the genes of other mammalian poxviruses. Examples of viruses with similar amino acid identity include suipoxvirus, yatapoxvirus, and leporipoxvirus. In terminal regions, however, collinearity is interrupted. In these regions, poxvirus homologues are either absent or share a lower percentage of amino acid identity. Most of these differences involve genes that are likely associated with viral virulence and host range. Unique to Chordopoxviridae, LSDV contains homologues of interleukin-10 (IL-10), IL-1 binding proteins, G protein-coupled CC chemokine receptor, and epidermal growth factor-like protein, which are found in other poxvirus genera.

== Epidemiology ==
LSDV mainly affects cattle and zebus, but has also been seen in giraffes, water buffalo, and impalas. Fine-skinned Bos taurus cattle breeds such as Holstein-Friesian and Jersey are the most susceptible to the disease. Thick-skinned Bos indicus breeds including the Afrikaner and Afrikaner cross-breeds show less severe signs of the disease. This is probably due to the decreased susceptibility to ectoparasites that Bos indicus breeds exhibit relative to Bos taurus breeds. Young calves and cows at peak lactation show more severe clinical symptoms, but all age-groups are susceptible to the disease.

=== Transmission ===
Outbreaks of LSDV are associated with high temperature and high humidity. It is usually more prevalent during wet summer and autumn months, especially in low-lying areas or near bodies of water; however, outbreaks can also occur during the dry season. Blood-feeding insects such as mosquitos and flies act as mechanical vectors to spread the disease. A single species vector has not been identified. Instead, the virus has been isolated from Stomoxys, Biomyia fasciata, Tabanidae, Glossina, and Culicoides species. The particular role of each of these insects in the transmission of LSDV continues to be evaluated. Outbreaks of lumpy skin disease tend to be sporadic since they are dependent upon animal movements, immune status and wind and rainfall patterns, which affect the vector populations.

The virus can be transmitted through blood, nasal discharge, lacrimal (tear duct) secretions, semen, and saliva. The disease can also be transmitted through infected milk to suckling calves. In experimentally infected cattle, LSDV was found in saliva 11 days after the development of fever, in semen after 22 days, and in skin nodules after 33 days. The virus is not found in urine or stool. Like other pox viruses, which are known to be highly resistant, LSDV can remain viable in infected tissue for more than 120 days.

== Immunity ==
=== Artificial immunity ===
There have been two different approaches to immunization against LSDV. In South Africa, the Neethling strain of the virus was first attenuated by 20 passages on the chorio-allantoic membranes of hens' eggs. Now the vaccine virus is propagated in cell culture. In Kenya, the vaccine produced from sheep or goatpox viruses has been shown to provide immunity in cattle. However, the level of attenuation required for safe use in sheep and goats is not sufficient for cattle. For this reason the sheeppox and goatpox vaccines are restricted to countries where sheeppox or goatpox is already endemic since the live vaccines could provide a source of infection for the susceptible sheep and goat populations.

In order to ensure adequate protection against LSDV, susceptible adult cattle should be vaccinated annually. Approximately 50% of cattle develop swelling (10–20 millimetres (1/2–3/4 in) in diameter) at the site of inoculation. This swelling disappears within a few weeks. Upon inoculation, dairy cows may also exhibit a temporary decrease in milk production.

=== Natural immunity ===
Most cattle develop lifelong immunity after recovery from a natural infection. Additionally, calves of immune cows acquire maternal antibodies and are resistant to clinical disease until about 6 months of age. To avoid interference with maternal antibodies, calves under 6 months of age whose dams were either naturally infected or were vaccinated should not be vaccinated. On the other hand, calves born from susceptible cows are also susceptible and should be vaccinated.

== History ==
Lumpy skin disease was first seen as an epidemic in Zambia in 1929. Initially, it was thought to be the result of either poisoning or a hypersensitivity to insect bites. Additional cases occurred between 1943 and 1945 in Botswana, Zimbabwe, and South Africa. Approximately, 8 million cattle were affected in a panzootic infection in South Africa in 1949, causing enormous economic losses. LSD spread throughout Africa between the 1950s and 1980s, affecting cattle in Kenya, Sudan, Tanzania, Somalia, and Cameroon.

In 1989 there was an LSD outbreak in Israel. This outbreak was the first instance of LSD north of the Sahara desert and outside of the African continent. This particular outbreak was thought to be the result of infected Stomoxys calcitrans being carried on wind from Ismailiya in Egypt. During a period of 37 days between August and September 1989, fourteen of the seventeen dairy herds in Peduyim became infected with LSD. All of the cattle as well as small flocks of sheep and goats in the village were slaughtered.

Throughout the past decade, LSD occurrences have been reported in Middle Eastern, European, and west Asian regions.

LSD was first reported to the Bangladesh livestock department in July 2019. Eventually 500,000 head were estimated to have been infected in this outbreak. The Food and Agriculture Organization (FAO) recommended mass vaccination. As a result of the introduction of fall armyworm and this cattle plague within a few months of each other, the FAO, the World Food Programme, Bangladesh Government officials, and others agreed to begin improving Bangladesh's livestock disease surveillance and emergency response capabilities. Method of entry of the virus into Bangladesh remains unknown.

In 2022 a lumpy skin disease outbreak in Pakistan killed over 7000 cattle. In India, between July and September 2022 the lumpy skin disease outbreak in India resulted in the death of over 184,447 cattle. The state of Rajasthan has seen a majority of the deaths. Inter-state and inter-district movement of cattle in a number of states has been restricted. Indian Council of Agricultural Research labs have undertaken creation of an indigenous vaccine. A goat pox vaccine is being used; 15 million doses had been administered by September 2022. There are at least three centres manufacturing the goat pox vaccine in India. Institutions with authority to test have been expanded.

In 2023, there was an outbreak of LSD in Nepal, during which more than 50,000 cattle and buffalo died from the disease.

On 29 June 2025 an outbreak was reported on a cattle farm in Chambéry, France.
