= Hartmann College =

Coordinates: 28.385076°N 79.410537°E

- School's main building
- Izzatnagar; Bareilly, Uttar Pradesh, 243001; India

Information
- Motto: He Who Loves Knowledge Loves Discipline
- Founder: Order of Friars Minor Capuchin
- Principal: Fr. Anil Kullu
- Gender: Co-ed, both boys and girls
- Classes: NC to 12th
- Average class size: Approximate of 70 students under class 5, and reduces gradually to 50 In Senior Classes
- Classes offered: English, Hindi, Physics, Chemistry, Biology, Computer Applications, Maths, Geography, History & Civics
- Language: English
- Hours in school day: 6
- Campus size: 90 acres (36 ha)
- Houses: Gandhi, Azad, Shastri, Subhash, Nehru, Tagore
- Sports: Basketball, football, cricket, volleyball, Taekwando, skating, music, table tennis, badminton, swimming
- Affiliation: ICSE and ISC
- Website: hartmanncollege.org.in

Hartmann College is a co-educational convent institution in Izzatnagar, Bareilly, India, run by the Catholic Minority and recognized by the Department of Education (U.P). It is affiliated to the Council for the Indian School Certificate Examinations, New Delhi.

The institution is managed and governed by the Order of Friars Minor Capuchin through a registered body, Hartmann Educational Society, Bareilly.

== History ==
Bishop Anastatius Hartmann (the Patron) was born in Atwis, in the Canton of Lucerne, Switzerland on 24 February 1803. He came to India as a missionary and worked in places like Gwalior, Patna and Mumbai. He founded schools and dispensaries and carried out charitable works for the poor and weaker sections of society.

Inspired by his life and to carry on his work of educational work the Capuchin fathers founded Hartmann College in 1967, and chose him to be the patron of the college. The motto is "He Who Loves Knowledge Loves Discipline" which was the guiding principle of Bishop Hartmann, the servant of God.

Hartmann College is located at Izzatnagar, Bareilly. Its sister institute, Bishop Hartmann Academy, is situated in Ara Gate, Mahilong, Ranchi – 835103 Jharkhand.

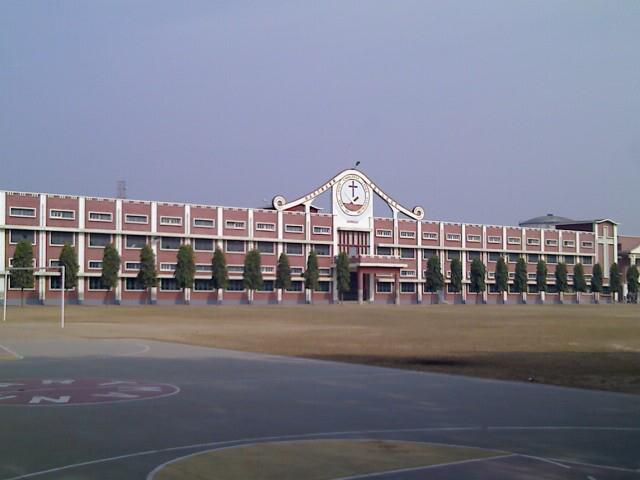
Hartmann College, Izzatnagar, Bareilly
