= Lumpy skin disease outbreak in India =

2022 cattle disease outbreak in India

2022 lumpy skin disease outbreak in India
- Date: July–September 2022
- Location: India, 15 states 251 districts (as on 23 Sept)
- Deaths: 184,447+ cattle (as on 23 Sept)
- Affected: 20,00,000 cattle (as on 23 Sept)
- Cattle vaccinated: 1.66 crore (by 23 Sept)
- Cattle population: 192.5 million (2019)

Five states with the most cattle deaths- Rajasthan, Punjab, Gujarat, Himachal Pradesh, Haryana. Other states such as Madhya Pradesh reported its first death in mid-September 2022; there have been 1436 deaths in Maharashtra. UP has seen at least 378 deaths.

The 2022 lumpy skin disease outbreak in India resulted in the death of over 97,000 cattle in three months between July and 23 September. Starting from outbreaks in Gujarat and Rajasthan, in three months cattle in 15 states across India were affected. On 21 September, out of 18,50,000 cases over 65% of cases were from Rajasthan. Over 50,000 deaths were reported from Rajasthan. India's cattle population according to the last livestock census was 192.5 million.

== Outbreak ==
In November 2019 lumpy skin disease in the country was confirmed in a lab. It was mainly restricted to sporadic cases in locations such as Odisha. The origin or source of the disease in India, as well as the outbreak in 2022 remained unknown. A comparison and analysis of the 2022 outbreak with the 2019 version found differences in the disease. States such as Kerala reported 30-40 cases each between December 2019 and January 2021. In August 2020 cases were reported from Assam.

Cases were first reported in April 2022 from Gujarat. In late July 2022 Gujarat introduced bans on cattle movement in select districts. Maharashtra's first case was reported on August 4 in Jalgaon district. On 6 August Rajasthan imposed restrictions on cattle fairs. On 20 August Panchkula district banned inter-district transport. On 24 August Uttar Pradesh started introducing restrictions. Affected districts in Madhya Pradesh saw movement bans. On 14 September cattle transport in Mumbai was banned; health certification is needed for movement. On 23 September Uttar Pradesh initiated more bans in movement of cattle. States such as Chhattisgarh initiated preventive measures even while it reported no cases of the disease. Delhi started free vaccinations on 26 September.

== Impact ==
The direct economic loss includes the value of the dead cattle, and associated losses such as decrease in the production of milk, including a decrease of yield in infected cattle. Movement restrictions add to the indirect losses. In August 2022 Gujarat reported a dip in milk collection amounting to approximately 1,00,000 liters per day in certain locations. Collection of milk in Rajasthan fell by over 20% in August 2022; by September collection had decreased by 500,000-600,000 litres per day. In some places collection has fallen to zero in Rajasthan. This has not impacted the price of milk. On 12 September Mother Dairy's managing director said the impact on production was minor.

== Scientific response ==
Indian laboratories have undertaken research on a domestic vaccine since 2019. A team led by Dr Naveen Kumar, principal scientist at ICAR-National Research Centre on Equines, developed India's first lumpy skin disease vaccine, named Lumpi-ProVacInd. The vaccine was launched on August 10, 2022.

In 2021, due to the unavailability of a proper (homologous) LSD vaccine, India authorized goatpox (heterologous) vaccine against LSDV in cattle. However, later, experimental trials and several evidences from field suggested that the goatpox vaccine (Uttarkashi strain) does not provide any significant protection against LSD in cattle (Biovet, 2023; Kumar, 2023). Therefore, India developed a homologous live-attenuated LSD vaccine (Lumpi-ProVacInd), which has been extensively tested in the field and has been found to be 100% safe and highly efficacious in cattle against LSD (Kumar et al., 2023a; Kumar and Tripathi, 2022). The vaccine has been commercialized and is likely to replace the existing practice of vaccinating cattle with goatpox vaccine (heterologous vaccine).

Public statements and explanations have been made related to the disease not impacting humans, and the impact of the disease on milk or meat. This includes statements by the Maharashtra animal husbandry commissioner, an Indian Council of Medical Research scientist, a joint director of the Indian Veterinary Research Institute, and head of department of veterinary medicine at a university in Punjab.
