= Lumpy skin disease outbreak in Pakistan =

Cattle disease outbreak in Pakistan

- Location: Pakistan
- Date: November 2021 – present
- Deaths: 7,000+

Lumpy skin disease was spotted in Pakistan in Jamshoro district, Sindh in November 2021. By 9 September 2022, over 7000 cattle had died. Pakistan has 93 million cattle and buffaloes.

In the beginning of March 2022, a representative of the Dairy and Cattle Farmers Association had requested government intervention in closing provincial borders for cattle. The association had also sent a letter to the Prime Minister in this regard. Samples from Karachi were sent to Islamabad for testing.

A goat pox vaccine has been found effective. Approval for imported vaccines was given in March 2022.
