= Capripoxvirus =

Virus classification
- (unranked): Virus
- Realm: Varidnaviria
- Kingdom: Bamfordvirae
- Phylum: Nucleocytoviricota
- Class: Pokkesviricetes
- Order: Chitovirales
- Family: Poxviridae
- Subfamily: Chordopoxvirinae
- Genus: Capripoxvirus

Species
- See text

Genus of viruses

Capripoxvirus is a genus of viruses in the subfamily Chordopoxvirinae and the family Poxviridae. Capripoxviruses are among the most serious of all animal poxviruses. All CaPV are notifiable diseases to the OIE (World Organisation for Animal Health). Sheep, goat, and cattle serve as natural hosts. These viruses cause negative economic consequences by damaging hides and wool and forcing the establishment of trade restrictions in response to an outbreak. The genus consists of three species: sheeppox virus (SPPV), goatpox virus (GTPV), and lumpy skin disease virus (LSDV). They share no serological relationship with camel pox, horse pox, or avian poxes. Capripoxviruses for sheeppox and goatpox infect only sheep and goat respectively. However, it is probable that North American relatives, the mountain goat and mountain sheep, may be susceptible to the strains but has not been experimentally proven. Lumpy skin disease virus affects primarily cattle, but studies have been shown that giraffes and impala are also susceptible to LSDV. Humans cannot be infected by Capripoxviruses.

== Geographic distribution and transmission ==
The geographic range of Capripoxviruses are bounded within Asia and Africa. SPPV and GTPV are limited to northern Africa, the Middle East, and continental Asia. In contrast, LSDV is only found in Sub-Saharan Africa. All Capripoxvirus species tend to be spread by means of insect vector. Sheeppox and goatpox are also transmissible by aerosol or by close contact with infected animals. Contamination of open cuts or wounds may also contribute to the spread of SPPV and GTPV. However, there is little to no susceptibility of lumpy skin disease when in close contact with an animal infected with LSDV. While sheeppox and goatpox viruses tend to enter animals through respiratory routes and abraded skin, biting insects are considered the major driving force for the spread and infection of LSDV.

== Genome ==
Capripoxviruses infect primarily sheep, goat, and cattle, but strains of capripoxviruses are difficult to distinguish between. Capripoxvirus strains are often recognized by how the main target host responds. They cannot be distinguished using routine laboratory tests such as virus neutralisation test, immunofluorescence test or agar gel immunodiffusion test. They, however, can be isolated by using the HinDill restriction enzymes to separate their DNA. Comparisons of fragmented DNA sequences from different strains showed that all capripoxviruses have a very similar nucleotide sequence homology. Strains were also proven to not all be host-specific. All Capripoxviruses DNA are double-stranded with lengths of around 150 kbp. Strains from goatpox and sheeppox share at least 147 genes; LSDV have an extra 9 genes that are non-functional in GTPV and SPPV. Strains of GTPV, SPPV, and LSDV generally have genome identities similar by at least 96%.

== Taxonomy ==
The genus contains the following species, listed by scientific name and followed by the exemplar virus of the species:

- Capripoxvirus goatpox, Goatpox virus
- Capripoxvirus lumpyskinpox, Lumpy skin disease virus
- Capripoxvirus sheeppox, Sheeppox virus

== Structure ==
Viruses in Capripoxvirus are enveloped, with brick-shaped geometries. Genomes are linear, around 154kb in length.

Genus	Structure	Symmetry	Capsid	Genomic arrangement	Genomic segmentation
Capripoxvirus	Brick-shaped		Enveloped	Linear	Monopartite

== Life cycle ==
Viral replication is cytoplasmic. Entry into the host cell is achieved by attachment of the viral proteins to host glycosaminoglycans (GAGs) mediates endocytosis of the virus into the host cell. Fusion with the plasma membrane to release the core into the host cytoplasm. Early phase: early genes are transcribed in the cytoplasm by viral RNA polymerase. Early expression begins at 30 minutes post-infection. Core is completely uncoated as early expression ends, viral genome is now free in the cytoplasm. Intermediate phase: Intermediate genes are expressed, triggering genomic DNA replication at approximately 100 minutes post-infection. Late phase: Late genes are expressed from 140 min to 48 hours post-infection, producing all structural proteins. Assembly of progeny virions starts in cytoplasmic viral factories, producing a spherical immature particle. This virus particle matures into brick-shaped intracellular mature virion (IMV). IMV virion can be released upon cell lysis, or can acquire a second double membrane from trans-Golgi and bud as external enveloped virion (EEV) host receptors, which mediates endocytosis. Replication follows the DNA strand displacement model. DNA-templated transcription is the method of transcription. The virus exits the host cell by existing in occlusion bodies after cell death and remaining infectious until finding another host. Sheep, goats, and cattle serve as the natural host. Transmission routes are fomite, mechanical, and contact.

Genus	Host details	Tissue tropism	Entry details	Release details	Replication site	Assembly site	Transmission
Capripoxvirus	Sheep; goat; cattle	None	Glycosaminoglycans	Lysis; budding	Cytoplasm	Cytoplasm	Arthropods; contact

== Diagnosis and symptoms ==
Capripoxviruses are characterized by the development of pox lesions on the skin. Sheeppox and goatpox infections may also result in the formation of lesions in internal organs such as the lungs. Lesions eventually become scabs on which the virus may still persist for months. The virus may also be found in the animal's saliva, nasal secretions, and milk. Other symptoms may include lymphadenitis, fever, excessive salivation, and conjunctivitis.

== Treatment and prevention ==
Animals produce a lifelong immunity to all Capripoxvirus strains if they recover from the viral infection. The Kenyan sheeppox and goatpox vaccines, produced by an intermediate strain, can also be used to generate immunity. The effects of the vaccine are generally long-lasting because Capripoxviruses have a single serotype. Prevention of an outbreak currently require the slaughter of infected and in-contact animals. However, eradication of Capripoxviruses can be achieved through vaccination and strict movement control of animal populations.
