= NYRA =

NYRA is an abbreviation for the following groups:

- National Youth Rights Association, a United States youth rights organization
- New York Racing Association, The NY State franchisee which runs racing operations at three New York State Thoroughbred racecourses; Aqueduct, Belmont Park and Saratoga Racecourse
- Nyra Banerjee (born 1987), Indian actress

== See also ==
- Naira (disambiguation)
