= Indian Institute of Millets Research =

Research institute in Telangana, India

ICAR-Indian Institute of Millets Research
- Type: Government
- Established: 1958; 68 years ago
- Affiliations: ICAR
- Director: Dr. C. Tara Satyavathi
- Location: Hyderabad, Telangana, India
- Website: millets.res.in

The Indian Institute of Millets Research (ICAR-IIMR) located at Rajendranagar (Hyderabad, Telangana, India) is an agricultural research institute engaged in basic and strategic research on sorghum and other millets. IIMR operates under the aegis of Indian Council of Agricultural Research (ICAR). It conducts agricultural research on Millets breeding, improvement, pathology and value addition. IIMR coordinates and facilitates sorghum research at national level through the All India Coordinated Research Projects on Sorghum (AICRP on Sorghum) and provides linkages with various national and international agencies.

It was founded in 1958 first established under the Project on Intensified Research on Cotton, Oilseeds and Millets (PIRCOM) and was engaged in research on important dryland crops such as sorghum, castor, groundnut, pigeon-pea and cotton as well as sorghum-based cropping systems. The institute paved way for agricultural research in India during that time. The institute has now been upgraded as ICAR - Indian institute of Millets Research in 2014.

== Mandate Crops ==
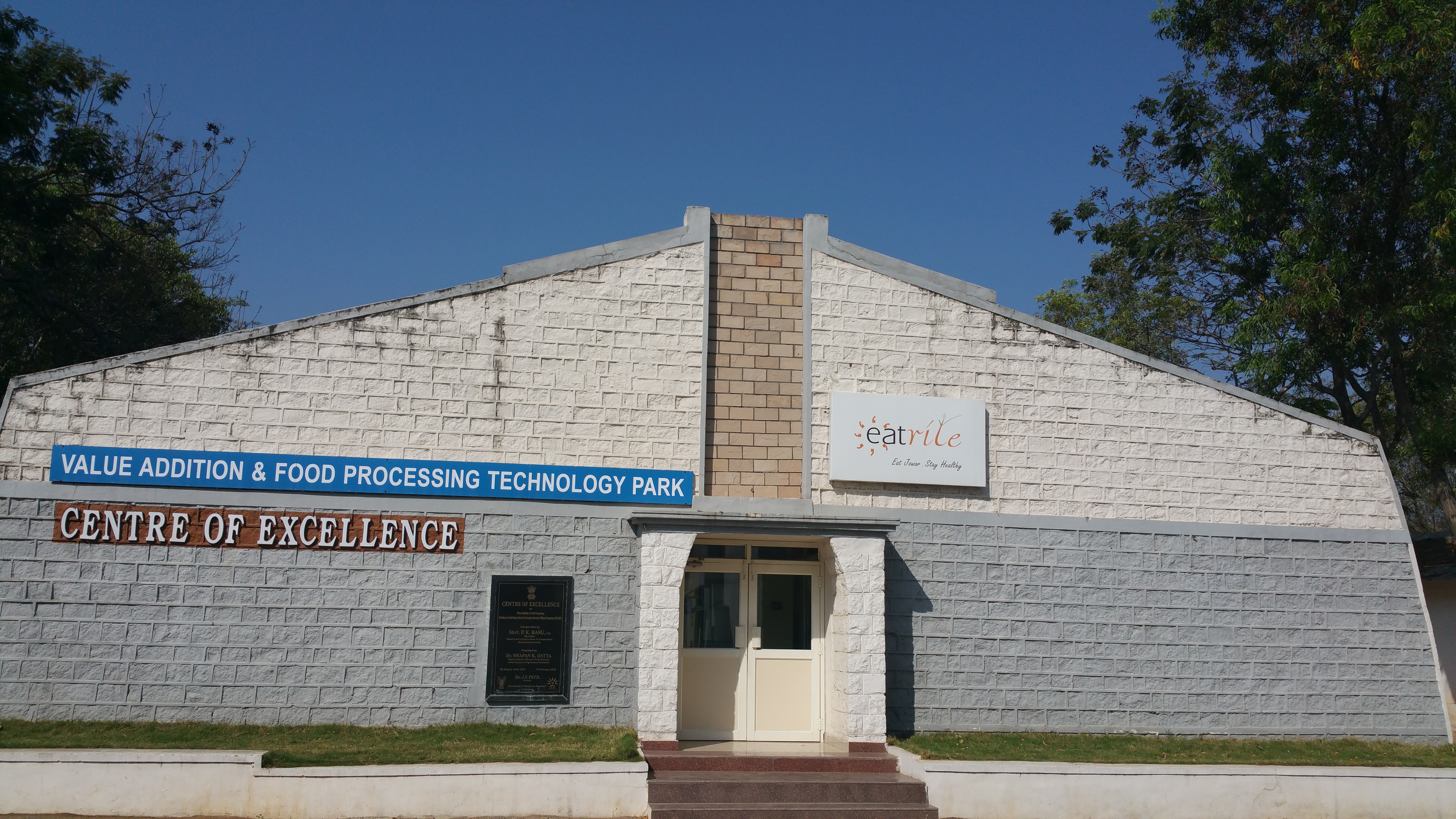
CoE Value addition Lab at ICAR-IIMR

ICAR - IIMR performs crop improvement research, using conventional as well as methods derived from biotechnology, on the following crops: sorghum, pearl millet, finger millet, foxtail millet, little millet, barnyard millet, proso millet and Kodo millet.

== ICAR-IIMR Scientists ==
- B Dayakar Rao

== See also ==
- International Crops Research Institute for the Semi-Arid Tropics
- Indian Institutes of Technology
