= Kanneboyina Nagaraju =

Indian medical scientist and immunologist

- Born: India
- Title: Dean and SUNY Distinguished Professor

Academic background
- Education: Sri Venkateswara Veterinary University Indian Veterinary Research Institute Sanjay Gandhi Postgraduate Institute of Medical Sciences

Kanneboyina Nagaraju is a medical scientist and immunologist who is credited with creating the MHC Class I transgenic mouse model for autoimmune myositis. Nagaraju is also credited with identifying novel glucocorticoid analogs with reduced side effect profiles in collaboration with Eric Hoffman and John McCall. He led international efforts to improve rigor and reproducibility of preclinical drug trials and phenotyping in neuromuscular disease models.

After receiving veterinary training at the Sri Venkateswara Veterinary University and the Indian Veterinary Research Institute, he attended the Sanjay Gandhi Postgraduate Institute of Medical Sciences where he received his PhD in Immunology and completed his post-doctoral training at NIH. Nagaraju was a tenure-track faculty member at the Johns Hopkins University School of Medicine and a tenured professor at Children's National Medical Center and George Washington University School of Medicine. He is a Professor, served as Founding Chair of the Department of Pharmaceutical Sciences, and currently serves as Dean at the School of Pharmacy and Pharmaceutical Sciences, SUNY-Binghamton University. He is Co-Founder of AGADA Biosciences and ReveraGen BioPharma.
