= Naira (given name) =

Naira is a feminine given name. Notable people with the name include:

- Naira Gelashvili (born 1947), Georgian writer
- Naira Hovakimyan (born 1966), Armenian game theorist
- Naira Melkumian (born 1953), Artsakhi politician
- Naira Beatriz Vier (born 1996), Brazilian badminton player
- Naira Zohrabyan (born 1965), Armenian politician

== See also ==
- Nigerian naira
