= Izzatnagar =

- Neighbourhood
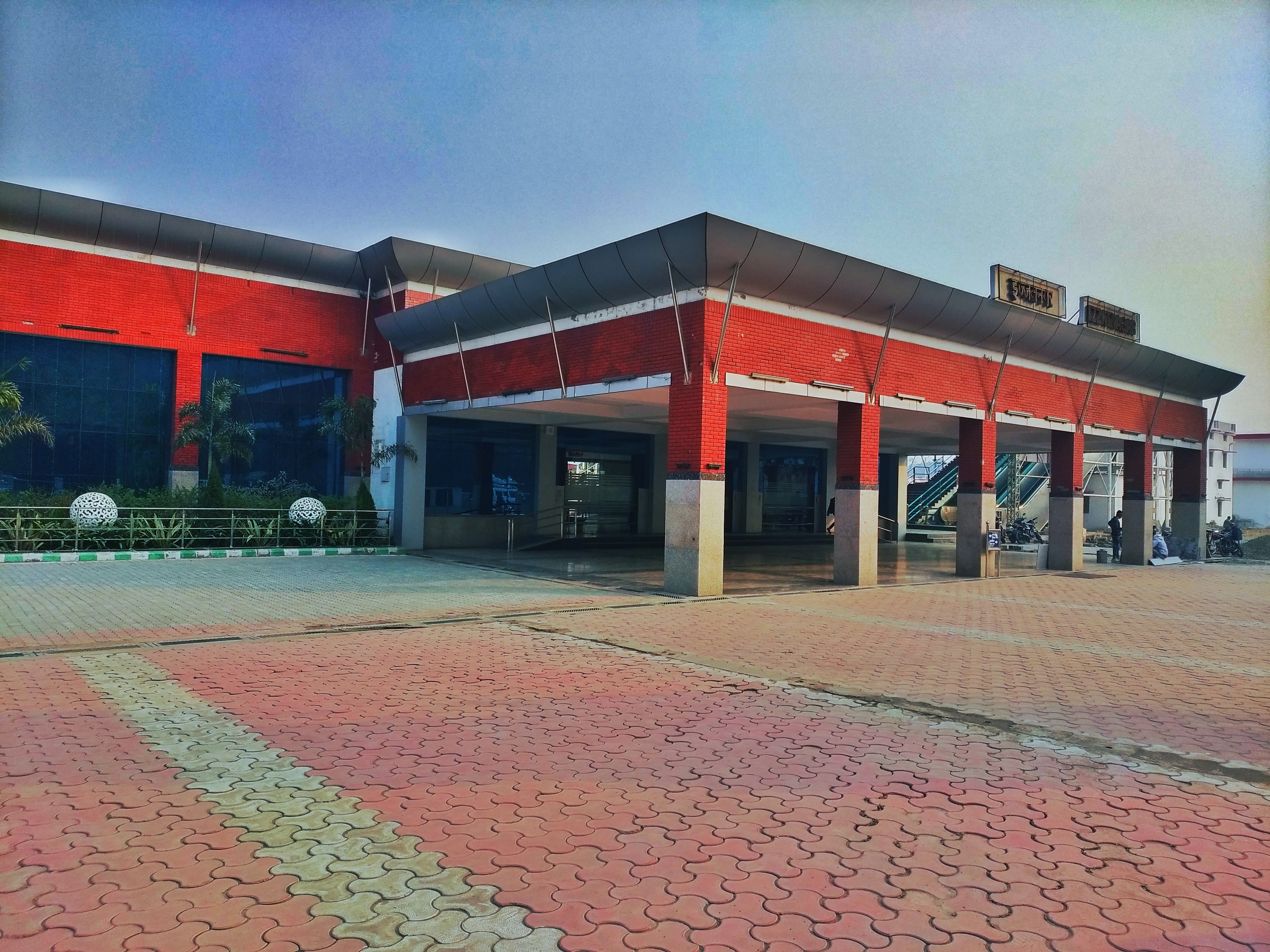
- Izzatnagar railway station

- Location in Uttar Pradesh, India
- Coordinates: 28.388607°N 79.421797°E
- Country: India
- State: Uttar Pradesh
- District: Bareilly district, Uttar Pradesh
- Metro: Bareilly, Uttar Pradesh

Government
  - Body: Bareilly Municipal Corporation
- Elevation: 240 m (790 ft)

Languages
  - Official: Hindi
- Time zone: UTC+5:30 (IST)
- PIN: 243 122
- Lok Sabha constituency: Bareilly (Lok Sabha constituency), Uttar Pradesh
- Vidhan Sabha constituency: Bareilly City, Bareilly division, Uttar Pradesh
- Civic agency: Bareilly Municipal Corporation

Izzatnagar is a locality in Bareilly in the Indian state of Uttar Pradesh. The railway station it houses is one of the three Divisional Headquarters of North Eastern Railways. Izzatnagar is also the location of the Indian Veterinary Research Institute (IVRI), Central Avian Research Institute (CARI), Railway Mechanical Workshop [Established in year 1913], Diesel Loco Shed and Hartmann College.

Izzatnagar also houses the famous Trishul Air-base of Indian Air Force.

== History ==
It is named after Sir Alexander Izat (1844–1920), a Scottish engineer and director of the Bengal and North Western Railway. He specialized in Bridge Engineering and came to Izzatnagar in 1896.

== Famous attractions ==
- Dhopeshwar Nath temple
- Trivti Nathan temple
- Railway Officers Colony – Road no. 2, Izzatnagar. (It contains 12 Bungalows, on a 1 Kilometre long road, that age back to 1900s and are still in use by current bureaucrats and highly reputed Indian government officers.)
- Indian Veterinary Research Institute, Izzatnagar.
- Izzatnagar Kalibari, Krishna Nagar (Established in 1970)
- Shiv Parvati Temple
- ST. PAUL Church
- St. Lawrence Church (Established in 1966)
- Masihi Kalisiya Church, Defence Colony, Izzatnagar
- Balaji (Vishnu) Temple, Rajendra-nagar, Izzatnagar.
- Funcity, Pilibhit bypass road.
- Sai Baba Mandir
- Bada Bagh Hanuman Mandir

== Education ==
Gulab Rai Montessori (GRM)Vidyalaya AFS, Bareilly, Kendriya Vidyalaya IVRI, Bareilly, Kendriya Vidyalaya NER, Bareilly Sacred hearts sr. Sec. Public school, Bareilly. Jai Narayan S V M Inter college, Bareilly.

== Nearby Places ==
- Nainital – 143 km
- Pilibhit – 51 km
- Pantnagar – 63 km
- Almora – 184 km
- Muradabad – 110 km
- Budaun – 55 km
- Faridpur – 23 km
- Ghunsi Aonla Uttar Pradesh – 50 km
