= Naira, Srikakulam district =

Naira
- village
- Interactive map of Naira
- Location in Andhra Pradesh, India
- Country: India
- State: Andhra Pradesh

Languages
  - Official: Telugu
- Time zone: UTC+5:30 (IST)
- Postal code: 532185

Naira is a village in Srikakulam mandal in Srikakulam district, Andhra Pradesh, India. It is situated at a distance of 15 km (9.3 mi) from the district headquarters and 5 km (3.1 mi) from Singupuram.

Agricultural College of Naira is located at village Naira and is affiliated to Acharya N. G. Ranga Agricultural University. Naira is located near the road that connects Amadalavalasa town to Bhyrisingupuram junction on National Highway-5.
