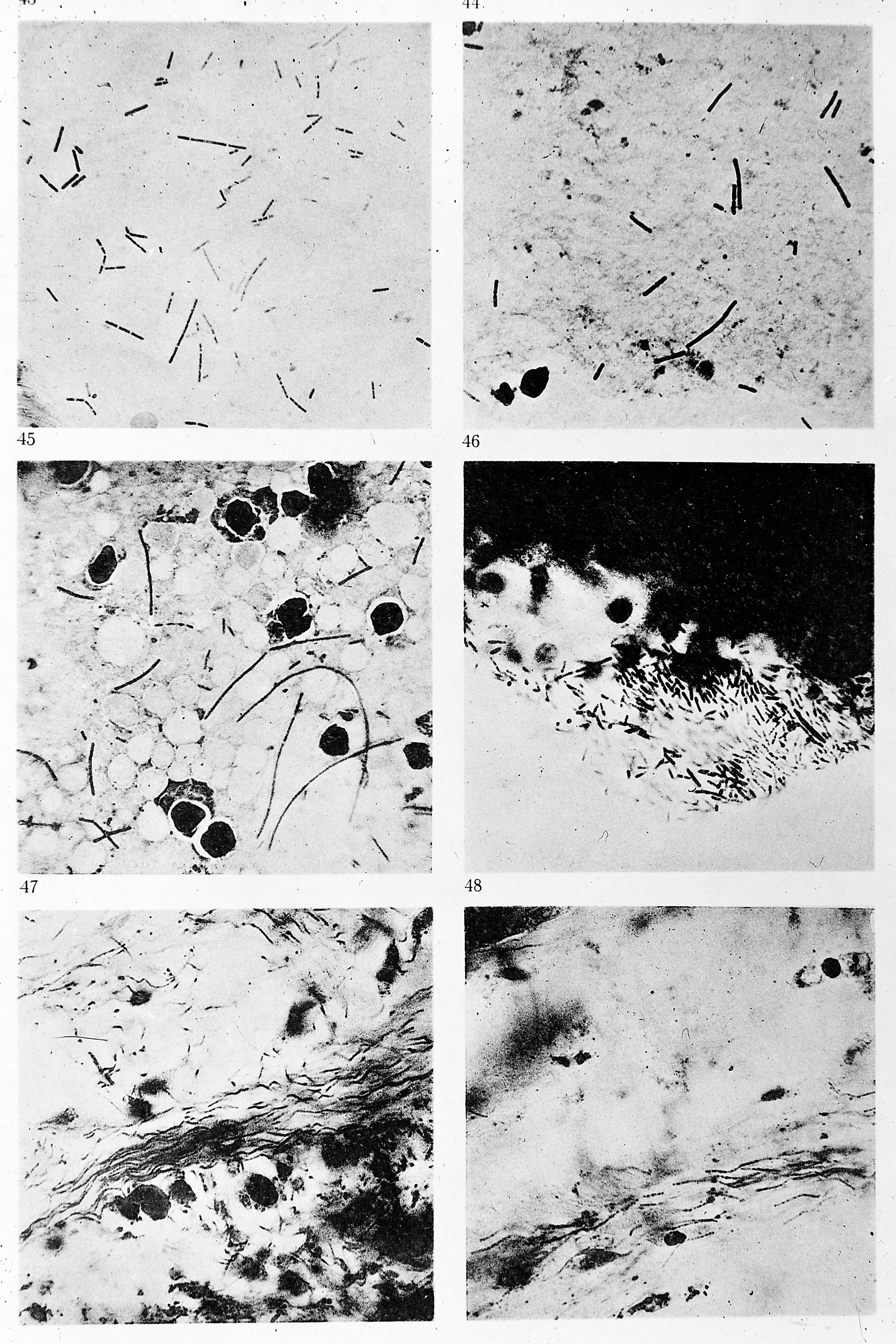
- Bacilli of malignant edema and in cornea of pox in sheep

Virus classification
- (unranked): Virus
- Realm: Varidnaviria
- Kingdom: Bamfordvirae
- Phylum: Nucleocytoviricota
- Class: Pokkesviricetes
- Order: Chitovirales
- Family: Poxviridae
- Genus: Capripoxvirus
- Species: Capripoxvirus sheeppox

Synonyms
- Sheep pox virus

= Sheeppox =

Sheeppox virus

Infectious disease of sheep caused by the sheeppox virus

Sheeppox (or sheep pox, known as variola ovina in Latin, clavelée in French, Pockenseuche in German) is a highly contagious disease of sheep caused by a poxvirus different from the benign orf (or contagious ecthyma). This virus is in the family Poxviridae and genus Capripoxvirus. Sheeppox virus (SPV) is the most severe of all the animal pox diseases and can result in some of the most significant economic consequences due to poor wool and leather quality.

Goatpox is a similar disease of goats, caused by a virus antigenically distinct from sheeppox virus.

== Virology ==
=== Structure ===
Sheeppox virus is approximately 150 kbp and shares 96% and 97% nucleotide identity with goatpox virus and lumpy skin disease virus, respectively. This virus has a linear, dsDNA genome and is thus a part of group I according to the Baltimore Classification System. The virus has a complex coat and capsid symmetry.

=== Host ===
The hosts for sheeppox virus are all breeds of wild and domesticated sheep. However, those animals native to the region where SPV is endemic, are far less susceptible. Young, lactating, and older animals are more susceptible to this viral infection though no viral preference has been found. This virus is endemic to Africa, Asia, India, and the Middle East.

=== Replication ===
The virus enters the host cell via endocytosis which is initiated by the attachment of viral proteins to host glycosaminoglycans. Then, SPV fuses with the plasma membrane which releases the viral core into the cytoplasm. Viral proteins help contribute to early gene transcription in the host cytoplasm and expression begins 30 minutes post infection. After early expression, the viral genome becomes free in the cytoplasm due to the core no longer being coated with the capsid.

The intermediate phase, approximately 100 minutes post infection, stimulates genomic replication as the intermediate genes are expressed. 140 minutes to 48 hours post infection is considered the late phase which is when all structural proteins are produced. Virion assembly begins in the cytoplasm with the formation of an immature spherical particle. Once maturation occurs, it is considered an intracellular mature virion. These are brick-shaped particles that can then be released from the cell either by budding or cell lysis.

=== Transmission ===
Sheeppox virus is an aerosol and can also be transmitted via contact with an infected animal. The saliva, secretions, feces, milk or scabs of those with SPV also cary the virus. Contaminated equipment is another major transmission factor and insect vectors play a minor role. SPV is mainly spread to new areas due to the movement of infected individuals. Immunity results after infection and there are vaccines available. The live, attenuated vaccines produce longer lasting and stronger immunity than the inactivated vaccine. It has been suggested that the lumpy skin disease virus vaccine is can also be used to prevent sheeppox.

== Symptoms and diagnosis ==
=== Symptoms ===
Symptoms can range from mild to severe depending on things such as age, breed, and immunity of the host. The virulence of the virus is also a contributing factor. The incubation period of the virus is 4–12 days.

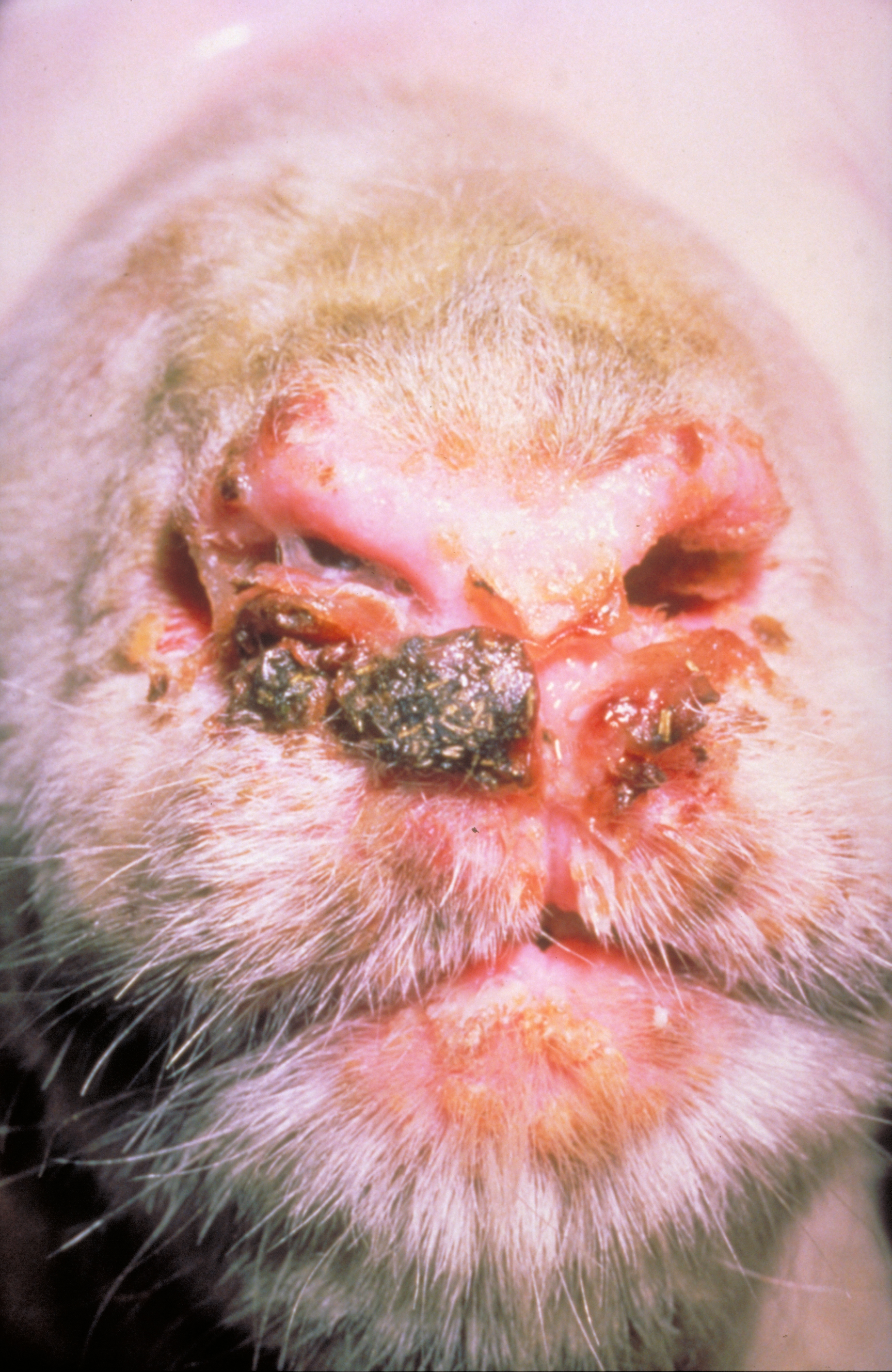
Lesions around lips (orf is on lips)

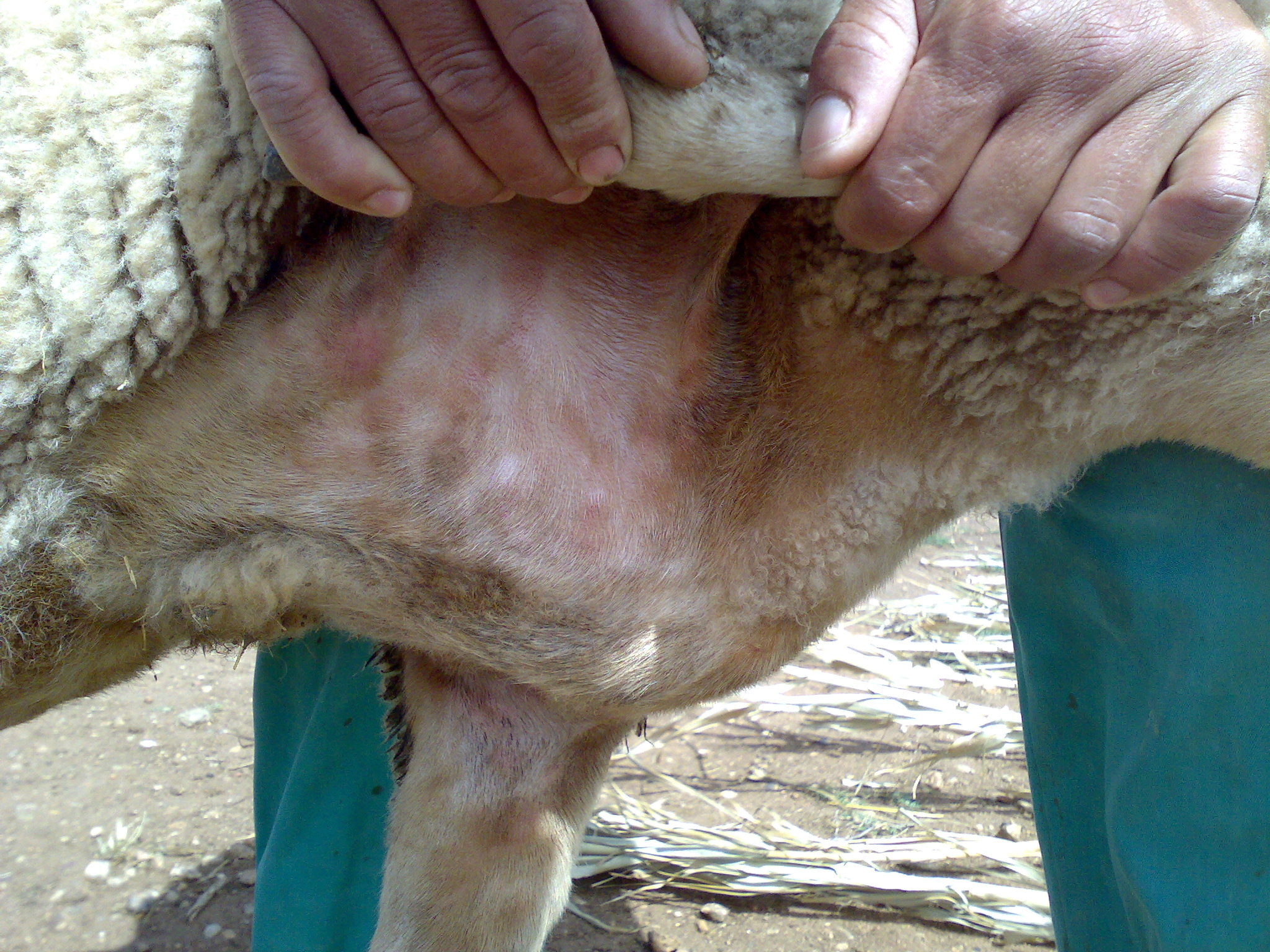
Starting lesions (reddening) in axilla

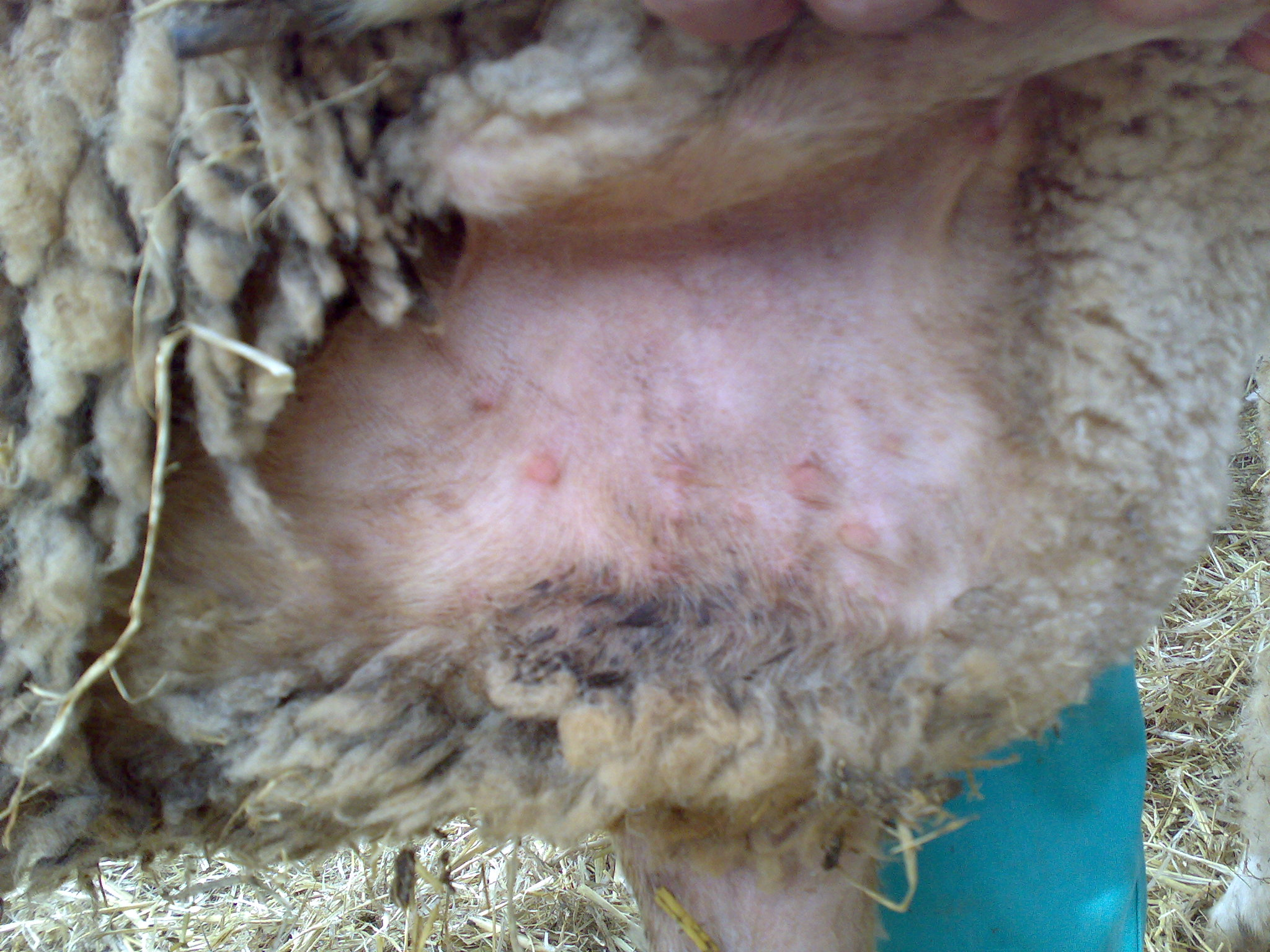
Crusty lesions in axilla

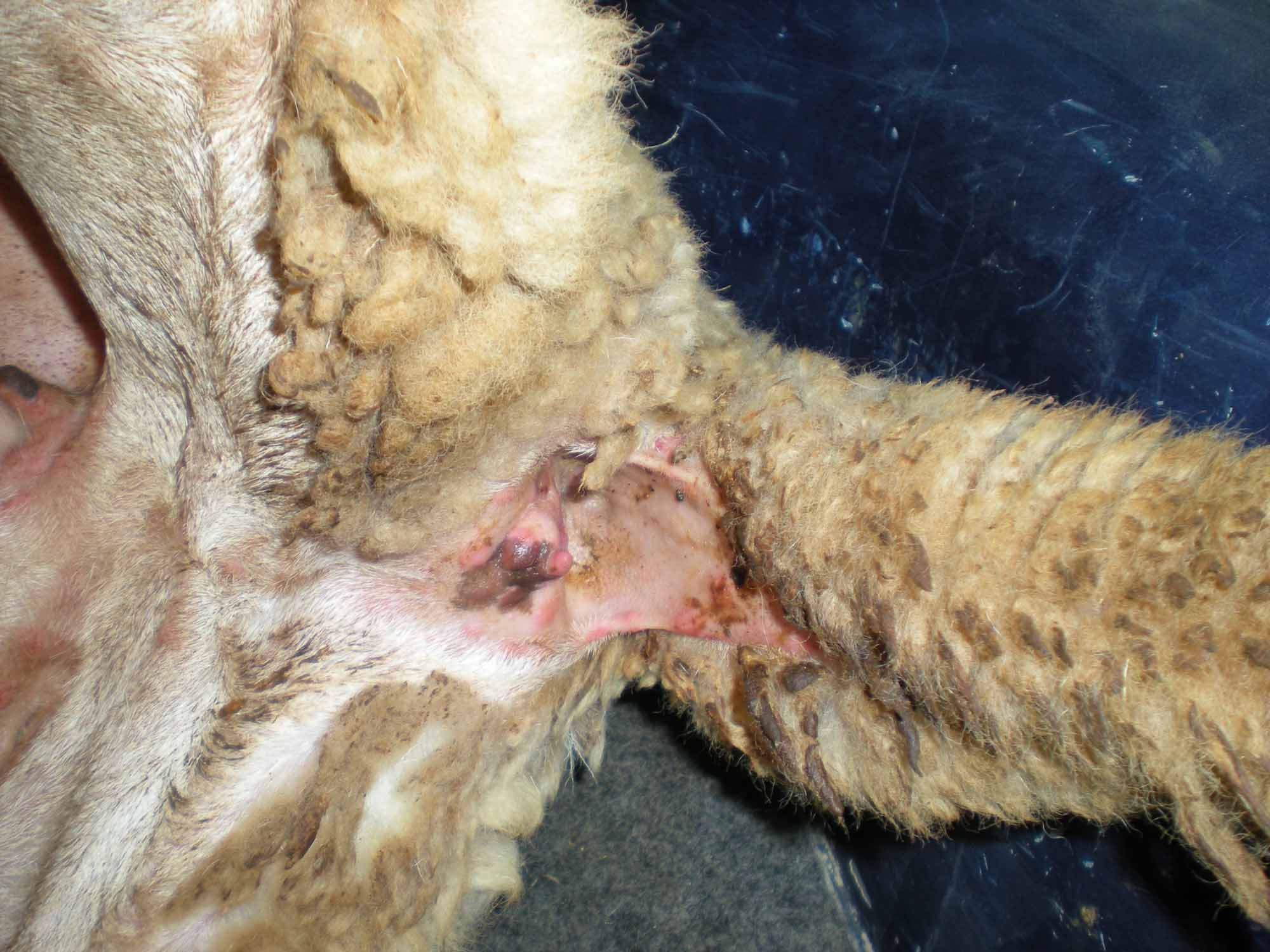
Crusty lesions on tail

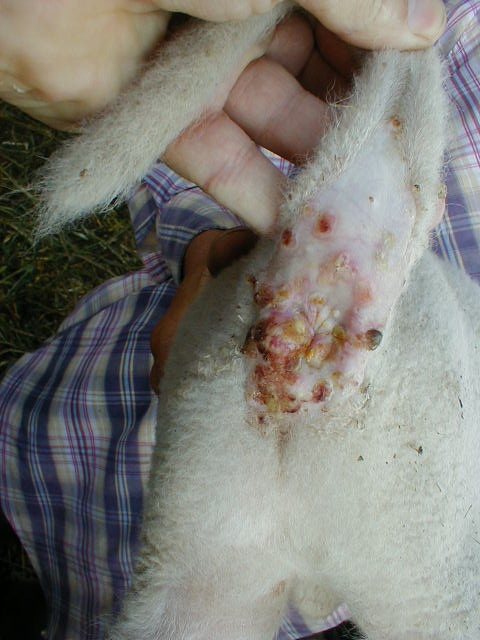
Crusty lesions on tail (lamb)

Early symptoms include increased temperature and macules. The skin lesions are most common on the muzzle, ears, and areas that are free of wool. Lesions on the skin quickly become raised due to local inflammation and edema. At this stage, the virus is extremely prevalent in the lesions.

The acute phase is characterized as 24 hours after papule appearance. In this phase the sheep may develop rhinitis, conjunctivitis, and swollen lymph nodes, up to eight times the normal size. Blepharitis can result from papules on the eyelids, mucosa becomes necrotic, and ulcers on the mucous membranes may create discharge. Due to lymph node swelling and developing lung lesions, breathing can become loud and labored.

The acute phase has passed when the papules become necrotic and scabs start to form. These scabs can last up to 6 weeks and typically leave a star-shaped scar. The presence of the skin lesions can lead to movement restriction of the animal, oropharynx lesions impact feeding and drinking ability, and lesions on the udder interfere with suckling. Secondary pneumonia is another common symptom, which is often fatal. In endemic areas morbidity is around 70-90% while SPV mortality is 5-10%, with its peak two weeks after the appearance of lesions. It is the cell mediated immune response which eliminates the infection.

There have only been two reported cases of zoonotic transmission which result in a mild localized reaction limited to the skin.

=== Diagnosis ===
==== Differential ====
Can include

- Contagious pustular dermatitis (scabby mouth)
- Blue tongue
- Mycotic dermatitis
- Sheep scab
- Mange
- Photosensitisation

==== Laboratory ====
Samples can include

- Full skin thickness biopsies
- Vesicular fluid if available
- Scabs
- Lymph node aspirates
- Lung and skin lesions

Techniques that can be used include

- Polymerase Chain Reaction (PCR)
- Agar gel immunodiffusion test (AGID)
- Enzyme-linked immunosorbent assay (ELISA)
- Transmission electron microscopy
- Virus isolation in cell culture

== History ==
In the 20th century, sheeppox virus was eradicated from continental Europe, but since then, there have been sporadic outbreaks, which are most likely due to imported animals. The countries with the highest number of cases are Ethiopia (223), Somalia (170), and Algeria (44). This resulted in a 16.3% case fatality rate out of the 9932 cases involved. From 2010 to 2011 there was a 46% decrease in the number of outbreaks with no specific explanation for this decrease. There has been no seasonal variability identified.

== Outbreaks ==
A relatively recent outbreak occurred in Russia in October 2016. This showed 25 cases, there were 5 deaths, and thus, puts the case fatality rate at 20. Responses included vaccinations, movement control within the country, and disinfection. The laboratory test to confirm this viral outbreak, was again PCR, with the results being positive.

There have been numerous outbreaks of sheeppox virus in Greece as of early September 2017 and anew during 2024 & 2025. This current location had 3 previous outbreaks in January 2017 with the origin of infection unknown. Real time PCR results tested positive for SPV and the infected were removed from the population either through death, destruction, or slaughter. Measures that were taken in response to these outbreaks were proper disposal of the carcasses, movement control within the country, and quarantine.

== Prevention ==
There is no treatment for sheeppox virus, thus efforts are directed towards prevention.

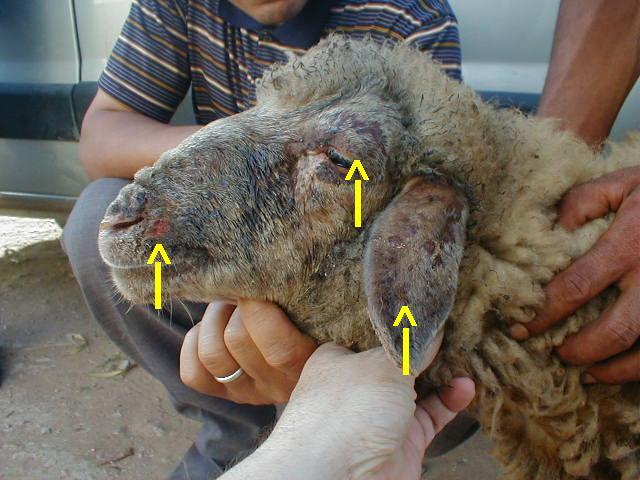
Vaccinal disease due to poorly inactivated vaccine

=== Vaccines ===
The most effective control over the disease has been the live, attenuated virus vaccine which have been shown to produce good immunity. There are inactivated vaccines, but they have shown to only provide around 5 months of immunity. In the case of an outbreak, it is suggested that the animals be euthanized and their carcasses burnt or buried. In most countries, large scale state vaccination programs are implemented against the disease. But, so far, few have succeeded in eradicating it.

=== Sanitation ===
Cleaning of farms and equipment is important in helping to prevent the spread of SPV. Infected animals may be quarantined and new animals should be isolated from the infected herds while transmission is still possible. If necessary, slaughtering or euthanasia of the herd can help prevent further disease transmission. Crucial is the proper disposal of the animals, either by burning or burying them.
