= Lam, Guntur district =

Lam
- Village
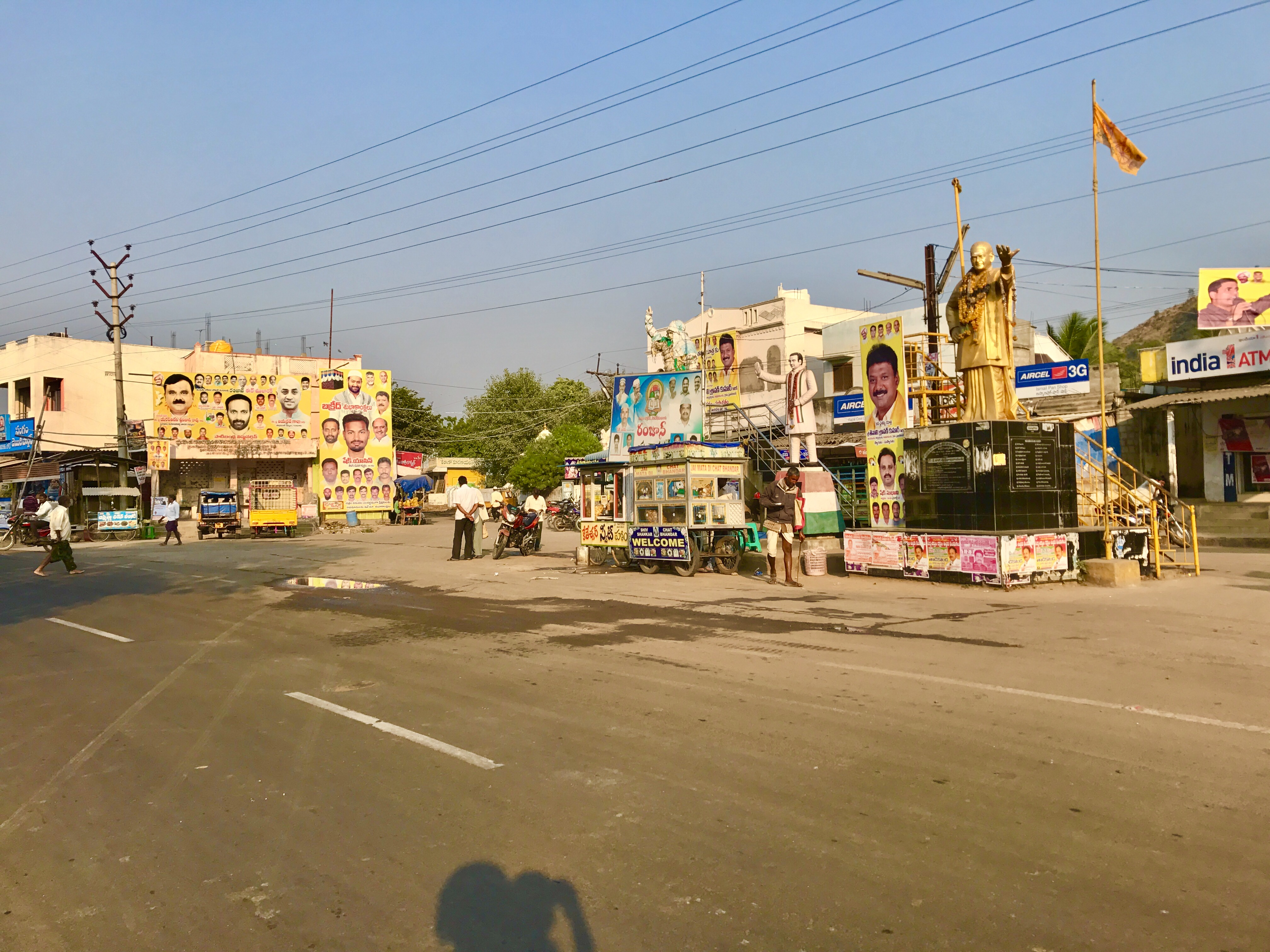
- Lam Village
- Interactive map of Lam
- Location in Andhra Pradesh, India
- Coordinates: 16°23′00″N 80°26′17″E
- Country: India
- State: Andhra Pradesh
- District: Guntur
- Mandal: Tadikonda

Government
  - Type: Panchayati raj
  - Body: Lam gram panchayat

Area
  - Total: 1,208 ha (2,990 acres)

Population (2011)
  - Total: 6,552
  - Density: 542.4/km^{2} (1,405/sq mi)

Languages
  - Official: Telugu
- Time zone: UTC+5:30 (IST)
- PIN: 522xxx
- Area code: +91–8663
- Vehicle registration: AP

Lam is a village in Guntur district of the Indian state of Andhra Pradesh. It is located in Tadikonda mandal of Guntur revenue division. It forms a part of Andhra Pradesh Capital Region.

== Etymology ==
The name originated from Lamas, a Buddhist monk.

== Demographics ==
As of 2011 census, Lam has a population of 6552, of which males are 3207 and females are 3345 with a sex ratio 1043, Child account a population of 762 with 11.63% of total population with a sex ratio of 1117. Literacy rate in Lam is 64.04%.

== Government and politics ==
Lam gram panchayat is the local self-government of the village. It is divided into wards and each ward is represented by a ward member. The ward members are headed by a Sarpanch.

== Education ==
Agricultural University and Regional Agricultural Research Station are the major educational and research establishments in the village. Regional Agricultural Research Station was set up in 1922.Home Science College (Acharya NG Ranga University). Private Institutions like Chalapathi Institute of Technology, Chalapathi Pharmaceutical sciences and Delhi Public School are located in the area.

== See also ==
- Villages in Tadikonda mandal
