= Indian Veterinary Research Institute =

Veterinary research facility in Uttar Pradesh, India

- Type: Research Institution
- Established: 1889; 137 years ago
- Director: Dr. Raghavendra Bhatta
- Total staff: 200+ Scientists
- Students: 750+ Students
- Location: Bareilly, Uttar Pradesh, 243122, India
- Campus: Urban
- Website: www.ivri.nic.in

The Indian Veterinary Research Institute (IVRI) is located in Izatnagar, Bareilly in the state of Uttar Pradesh. It is a premier institute of veterinary sciences, deemed university and an advanced research facility specializing in veterinary medicine and allied fields. It is generally regarded as "AIIMS of Veterinary Sciences" in India. The institute also has regional campuses in Mukteshwar, Bengaluru, Palampur, Pune, Kolkata, and Srinagar.

== History ==
Formerly known as the Imperial Bacteriological Laboratory, the institute was renamed the Imperial Veterinary Research Institute in 1925. After India gained independence, it was renamed the Indian Veterinary Research Institute. The institute is currently under the administrative control of the Indian Council of Agricultural Research (ICAR), New Delhi.

On the recommendation of the University Grants Commission, the Ministry of Education, Government of India, conferred the status of "Deemed to be University" on the institute on 16 November 1983, under Section 3 of the UGC Act of 1956. The institute began offering undergraduate education in 2015-16 with 20 seats. For the academic year 2023-24, the number of undergraduate seats increased to 55, including 45 regular seats, 7 payment seats, and 3 seats reserved for NRI students.

== Academics ==
UG Programme at IVRI Deemed University With its experience in providing education at the Master's and Doctoral levels, the Indian Veterinary Research Institute (Deemed University) was entrusted by the Indian Council of Agricultural Research and the Veterinary Council of India with the responsibility of starting undergraduate courses in Veterinary Sciences, specifically the BVSc & AH program. Accordingly, from the academic session 2015-16, the institute initiated an undergraduate program in Veterinary Sciences, leading to a BVSc & AH degree. Five batches of BVSc & AH students have completed their bachelor's degrees.

Furthermore ICAR - IVRI also provides UG courses for BTech. in Animal Biotechnology (Started in 2023) and BTech. in Dairy Technology (Started in 2025)

== Number of seats ==
The total number of seats for the BVSc & AH program is 60. The seat distribution is as follows:

Total Number of Seats = 60 Number of Seats to be filled by VCI = 15%

- Number of Seats to be filled by ICAR-IVRI Deemed University = 85%
- Regular/ Open Seats = 62.5%
- Payment Seats = 15%
- NRI seats = 7.5%

Note : The reservation policy of the Government of India will apply to the allocation of these seats

== Rankings ==
IVRI, Bareilly, has been ranked number 6 in the Agricultural and Allied University category in India by the National Institutional Ranking Framework (NIRF) University Rankings 2023.

== Notable alumni ==
- Kanneboyina Nagaraju, Professor and Founding Chair, School of Pharmacy and Pharmaceutical Sciences, Binghamton University

== See also ==
- Veterinary Council of India
- Indian Council of Agricultural Research
