= ATCvet code QI02 =

Veterinary medical products classification subgroup

ATCvet code QI02 Immunologicals for Bovidae (Note: This subgroup does not include immunologicals for goats and sheep although these species belong to the family Bovidae. Products for goats are in QI03 Immunologicals for Capridae, products for sheep in QI04 Immunologicals for Ovidae.) is a therapeutic subgroup of the Anatomical Therapeutic Chemical Classification System for veterinary medicinal products, a system of alphanumeric codes developed by the World Health Organization (WHO) for the classification of drugs and other medical products for veterinary use. Subgroup QI02 is part of the anatomical group QI Immunologicals.

National versions of the ATC classification may include additional codes not present in this list, which follows the WHO version.

== QI02A Cattle ==
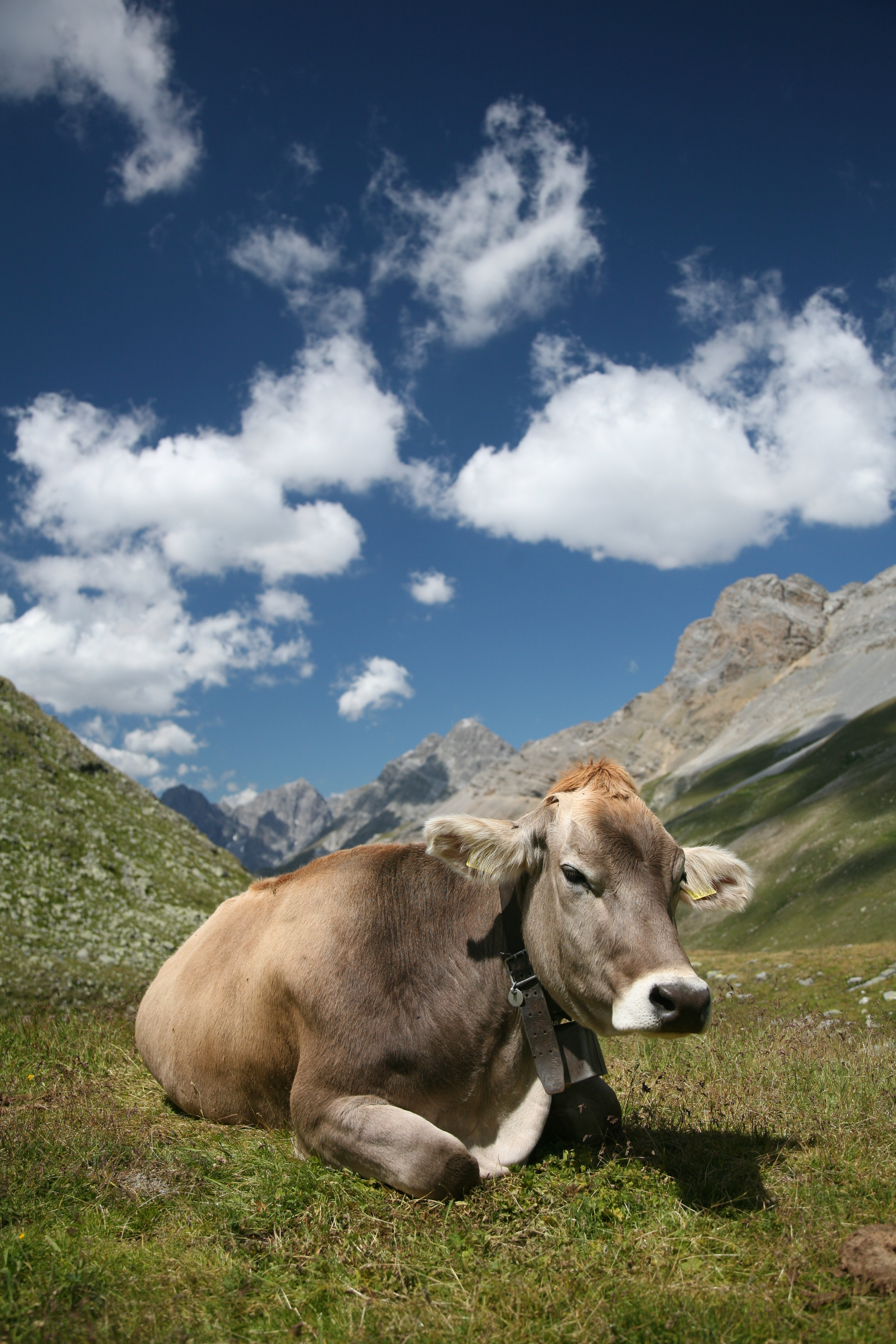

=== QI02AA Inactivated viral vaccines ===
QI02AA01 Bovine viral diarrhea (BVD)
QI02AA02 Bovine respiratory syncytial virus (BRSV)
QI02AA03 Bovine rhinotracheitis virus (IBR)
QI02AA04 Foot and mouth disease virus
QI02AA05 Bovine parainfluenza virus + bovine adenovirus + bovine reovirus
QI02AA06 Bovine parainfluenza virus + bovine adenovirus + bovine reovirus + bovine rhinotracheitis virus
QI02AA07 Bovine parainfluenza virus + bovine adenovirus + bovine reovirus + bovine respiratory syncytial virus
QI02AA08 Bluetongue virus

=== QI02AB Inactivated bacterial vaccines (including mycoplasma, toxoid and chlamydia) ===
QI02AB01 Clostridium
QI02AB02 Mycobacterium
QI02AB03 Leptospira
QI02AB04 Pasteurella
QI02AB05 Salmonella
QI02AB06 Escherichia
QI02AB07 Coxiella + chlamydia
QI02AB08 Escherichia + salmonella + pasteurella + streptococcus
QI02AB09 Escherichia + salmonella
QI02AB10 Escherichia + salmonella + pasteurella
QI02AB11 Clostridium + pasteurella
QI02AB12 Clostridium + salmonella
QI02AB13 Escherichia + streptococcus
QI02AB14 Pasteurella + streptococcus + corynebacterium
QI02AB15 Chlamydia
QI02AB16 Streptococcus + staphylococcus + pseudomonas + corynebacterium
QI02AB17 Escherichia + staphylococcus
QI02AB18 Streptococcus

=== QI02AC Inactivated bacterial vaccines and antisera ===
Empty group

=== QI02AD Live viral vaccines ===
QI02AD01 Bovine rhinotracheitis virus (IBR)
QI02AD02 Bovine viral diarrhea (BVD)
QI02AD03 Bovine viral diarrhea + bovine respiratory syncytial virus
QI02AD04 Bovine respiratory syncytial virus (BRSV)
QI02AD05 Bovine parainfluenza virus
QI02AD06 Bovine rhinotracheitis virus + bovine parainfluenza virus
QI02AD07 Bovine respiratory syncytial virus + bovine parainfluenza virus
QI02AD08 Bovine rotavirus + bovine coronavirus
QI02AD09 Bovine rotavirus
QI02AD10 Bovine coronavirus

=== QI02AE Live bacterial vaccines ===
QI02AE01 Mycobacterium
QI02AE02 Salmonella
QI02AE03 Escherichia
QI02AE04 Bacillus anthracis
QI02AE05 Mycoplasma

=== QI02AF Live bacterial and viral vaccines ===
Empty group

=== QI02AG Live and inactivated bacterial vaccines ===
Empty group

=== QI02AH Live and inactivated viral vaccines ===
QI02AH01 Live bovine rhinotracheitis virus (IBR) + live bovine respiratory syncytial virus (BRSV) + inactivated bovine viral diarrhea (BVD) + inactivated bovine parainfluenza virus

=== QI02AI Live viral and inactivated bacterial vaccines ===
QI02AI01 Live bovine rotavirus + live bovine coronavirus + inactivated escherichia

=== QI02AJ Live and inactivated viral and bacterial vaccines ===
Empty group

=== QI02AK Inactivated viral and live bacterial vaccines ===
Empty group

=== QI02AL Inactivated viral and inactivated bacterial vaccines ===
QI02AL01 Bovine rotavirus + bovine coronavirus + escherichia
QI02AL02 Bovine rotavirus + bovine coronavirus + parvovirus + escherichia
QI02AL03 Bovine rotavirus + escherichia
QI02AL04 Bovine parainfluenza virus + bovine respiratory syncytial virus + pasteurella
QI02AL05 Bovine rotavirus + bovine coronavirus + clostridium + escherichia

=== QI02AM Antisera, immunoglobulin preparations, and antitoxins ===
QI02AM01 Escherichia antiserum
QI02AM02 Salmonella antiserum
QI02AM03 Pasteurella antiserum + salmonella antiserum + streptococcus antiserum + escherichia antiserum
QI02AM04 Escherichia antiserum + pneumococci antiserum
QI02AM05 Bovine rotavirus antiserum + bovine coronavirus antiserum + escherichia antiserum
QI02AM06 Salmonella antiserum + pasteurella antiserum + escherichia antiserum
QI02AM07 Salmonella antiserum + escherichia antiserum
QI02AM08 Pasteurella antiserum

=== QI02AN Live parasitic vaccines ===
QI02AN01 Dictyocaulus

=== QI02AO Inactivated parasitic vaccines ===
QI02AO01 Dictyocaulus
QI02AO02 Cryptosporidium

=== QI02AP Live fungal vaccines ===
QI02AP01 Trichophyton

=== QI02AQ Inactivated fungal vaccines ===
QI02AQ01 Trichophyton

=== QI02AR In vivo diagnostic preparations ===
QI02AR01 Bovine tuberculin PPD
QI02AR02 Avian tuberculin PPD

=== QI02AS Allergens ===
Empty group

=== QI02AT Colostrum preparations and substitutes ===
QI02AT01 Escherichia

=== QI02AU Other live vaccines ===
Empty group

=== QI02AV Other inactivated vaccines ===
Empty group

=== QI02AX Other immunologicals ===
Empty group

== QI02B Buffalo ==
Empty group

== QI02X Bovidae, others ==
Empty group
