= Sealpox =

Sealpox virus

Virus classification
- (unranked): Virus
- Realm: Varidnaviria
- Kingdom: Bamfordvirae
- Phylum: Nucleocytoviricota
- Class: Pokkesviricetes
- Order: Chitovirales
- Family: Poxviridae
- Genus: Parapoxvirus
- Species: incertae sedis
- Virus: Sealpox virus

Sealpox
- Specialty: Dermatology

Sealpox is a cutaneous (skin) condition caused by a Parapoxvirus, usually affecting seal handlers who have been bitten by infected harbor or grey seals. First identified in 1969, it wasn't unequivocally proven to be transmissible to humans until 2005, though such transmission had been reported at least as early as 1987. It causes lesions that closely resemble those caused by orf. As many as 2% of seals in marine mammal rehabilitation facilities in North America may have it.

== See also ==
- Farmyard pox
- Tanapox
- Skin lesion
