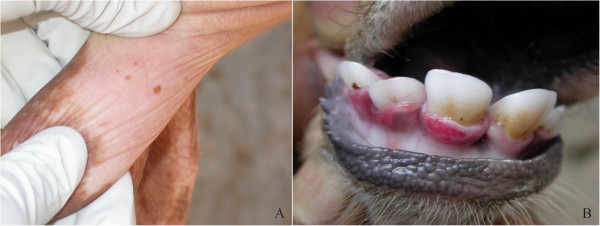
- Photograph of BPSV infection in dairy cattle from Siranjganj. Panel (A) shows parapoxvirus lesion on the teat of animal. Panel (B) shows erosions on the gingiva

Virus classification
- (unranked): Virus
- Realm: Varidnaviria
- Kingdom: Bamfordvirae
- Phylum: Nucleocytoviricota
- Class: Pokkesviricetes
- Order: Chitovirales
- Family: Poxviridae
- Genus: Parapoxvirus
- Species: Parapoxvirus bovinestomatitis

Synonyms
- Bovine papular dermatitis virus; Bovine pustular stomatitis virus; Stomatitis papulosa virus

= Bovine papular stomatitis =

Bovine papular stomatitis virus

Species of virus

Bovine papular stomatitis is a zoonotic farmyard pox caused by Bovine papular stomatitis virus (BPSV), which can spread from infected cattle to cause disease in milkers, farmers and veterinarians. Generally there are usually one or multiple skin lesions, typically on the hands or forearm. The disease is generally mild.

BPSV is a member of the family Poxviridae and the genus Parapoxvirus. Spread typically occurs by direct contact with the infected animal, but has been reported in people without direct contact. BPSV may appear similar to foot-and-mouth disease. It has been found to exhibit a size of around 320 nm by 190 nm, slightly larger than a typical parapoxvirus. BPSV exhibits an egg-like shape.

It occurs worldwide in cattle. Most notably in conditions where cattle are in close contact with one another and in high-stress environments, such as fattening facilities. In other animals the lesions are reddish, raised, sometimes ulcerative lesions on the lips, muzzle, and in the mouth. It usually occurs before the age of two years.

== Clinical signs and symptoms ==
=== In cattle ===
The most common signs of BPSV in cattle are raised, erosive lesions around the muzzle, lips, cheek linings, and udders. During post-mortem examinations, they have also been found further down the digestive tract (such as in the rumen, reticulum, and omasum).

Immunocompromised animals may exhibit a systemic version of the disease, displaying virus particles in their blood or lymphatic systems. These nodules exhibit thickening of the skin (hyperkeratosis). Inflammation and edema have also been observed.

Lesions can be found to be about the size of a soybean, though they often vary in size. Secondary bacterial infections and ulceration on or around these lesions can also be found.

BPSV likely causes some form of persistent infection or frequent reinfections. Studies show recurrence rates of up to 53% over several years in different cattle groups. One survey revealed that the majority of oral swabs from healthy calves indicated a positive result for BPSV DNA. Researchers suggest that many cattle are infected- though they may be asymptomatic and act as reservoirs for the virus.

=== In humans ===
The severity of BPSV in humans is understood to be minimal. Humans who frequently work in the dairy industry can come into contact with BPS lesions and sometimes develop lesions of their own, usually on the hands and fingers. These lesions are often referred to as "milker's nodules", "udder pox", or "milker's nodes" and appear similar to Orf virus lesions.

Frequency in humans is poorly understood. Overall, BPSV is reported to be a neglected zoonoses due to its lack of severity. It is often generalized among the other parapoxviruses in human medicine, therefore leading to a lack of specific evidence pertaining specifically to BPSV.

Students at the Auburn University College of Veterinary Medicine showed clinical signs of the virus in the late 1970s. Five individuals (students and faculty members) at the university were exposed to and possibly contracted BPSV- sparking the development a surveillance program to determine the frequency of the disease.

The surveillance program extended over a 12-month period, involving 115 students. The students were asked about their frequency of exposure to bovine mouths, where 59 out of the 115 students confirmed frequent exposure- most of the students who reported frequent exposure were involved in large animal anesthesiology, where intubation and other oral contact is commonplace. 2 of the 59 students with frequent exposure reported probable BPSV cases, with the lesions reported to be "uncomplicated" and "scarce". However, within the same group of 115 students, 2 were reported to have had brucellosis infections, and 5 had been exposed to rabies. Due to the infrequency and uncomplicated nature of BPSV in veterinary students, the occurrence of BPSV in humans was reported to be "low on the list of zoonoses in terms of public health importance."

== Host-cell and immune interactions ==
=== Cellular effects ===
Nuclei in the epithelial cells of BPSV nodules have shown pyknosis and karyorrhexis. BPSV affects keratinocytes of the stratum spinosum layer of the epidermis, causing ballooning, vacuolation, and erosive dermatitis. Infected cells often display cytoplasmic inclusion bodies when stained with hematoxylin-eosin stain. Cells in the spinosum layer can also display granular "eosinophilic" or "basophilic" characteristics.

The BPSV genome encodes for a viral vascular endothelial growth factor (vVEGF), which are unique to BPSV, Orf viruses, and pseudocowpoxvirus (PCPV). vVEGFs mimic host vascular factors that bind to receptor tyrosine kinase enzymes and include N- and O- linked glycosylation sites, unique cystine knot motifs, and aspartic acid residues that bind specifically to VEGF receptors. vVEGFs affect tumor development and embryogenesis.

=== Blocking of chemokine activity ===
BPSV-CBP interacts with inflammatory chemokines that attract monocytes and dendritic cells (DCs) to inflamed skin, as well as constitutive chemokines involved in the movement of antigen-presenting cells within lymphoid tissue. It also bound CXC chemokines (linked to neutrophil recruitment) and the lymphotactin chemokine XCL1, which draws T cells to the site of infection.

Compared to type II chemokine binding proteins (CBPs) from Orthopoxviruses and Leporipoxviruses, BPSV-CBP exhibits a broader binding spectrum, including CC, CXC, and XC chemokines. This divergence hints at an evolutionary path that has allowed Parapoxvirus-CBPs (PPV-CBPs) to develop this broader interaction capability, which is also seen in some herpesviruses.

The recruitment of various immune cells, such as monocytes, NK cells, mast cells, and neutrophils, is critical for immune defense against viral pathogens. It remains uncertain how effective BPSV-CBP is against neutrophil-mediated defense mechanisms.

BPSV-CBP likely inhibits cell trafficking in infected hosts, potentially delaying adaptive immune responses.

One study showed that BPSV-CBP significantly inhibited neutrophil infiltration in a skin inflammation model, although this effect was temporary. The study states that poxviruses utilize unique chemokine-binding strategies to evade the robust immune response of the skin, a primary barrier against infection. By dampening inflammation and shielding infected cells, BPSV-CBP may contribute to persistent infections. The ability of BPSV-CBP to modulate neutrophil responses indicates its potential as an anti-inflammatory agent, though it may need to be used alongside other treatments to effectively manage inflammation in skin disorders.

=== BPSV potential as a viral vector ===
BPSV has several advantageous features for use in a viral vector vaccine:

- It can carry large amounts of foreign DNA, is well-adapted to cattle with potential for persistent subclinical infection.
- It fields a relatively weak immune response that may reduce unwanted anti-vector responses.
- BPSV's preference for mucosal surfaces makes it promising for enhancing mucosal immunity, which is important for respiratory disease defense.
- BPSV's nature may also allow for extended immunization periods within cattle populations, minimizing the need for frequent vaccinations.

BPSV has been used in an experiment involving Bovine Herpesvirus 1 (BoHV-1) to observe the potential for BPSV as a viral vector. BoHV-1 has 3 main envelope glycoproteins (gB, gD, and gC) that, when reactivated after a latent period, induce a targeted immune response. Researchers in this study created a recombinant BPSV-C5 strain that contained a modified BoHV-1 gD gene and was able to inhibit the NF-κB pathway, a crucial process during viral infection. Researchers inserted a modified BoHV-1 gB gene into the BPSVgD virus. Genetic alterations were not indicated to hinder viral replication, as both BPSVgD and the BPSVgD/gB virus showed replication rates similar to wild-type BPSV in vitro.

In the same experiment, ovine fetal turbinate (OFTu) cells were either uninfected or infected with BPSVgD/gB and examined using antibody-flagged immunofluorescence. Western blot analysis confirmed that the BPSVgD/gB virus successfully expressed both BoHV-1 glycoproteins. Results indicated that the BPSVgD strain was non-virulent, but BoHV-1 antibody titers were elevated for weeks following inoculation. No adverse effects were recorded with the use of the BPSVgD or BPSVgD/gB strains.
