= ATCvet code QI08 =

Veterinary medical products classification subgroup

ATCvet code QI08 Immunologicals for Leporidae is a therapeutic subgroup of the Anatomical Therapeutic Chemical Classification System for veterinary medicinal products, a system of alphanumeric codes developed by the World Health Organization (WHO) for the classification of drugs and other medical products for veterinary use. Subgroup QI08 is part of the anatomical group QI Immunologicals.

National versions of the ATC classification may include additional codes not present in this list, which follows the WHO version.

== QI08A Rabbit ==
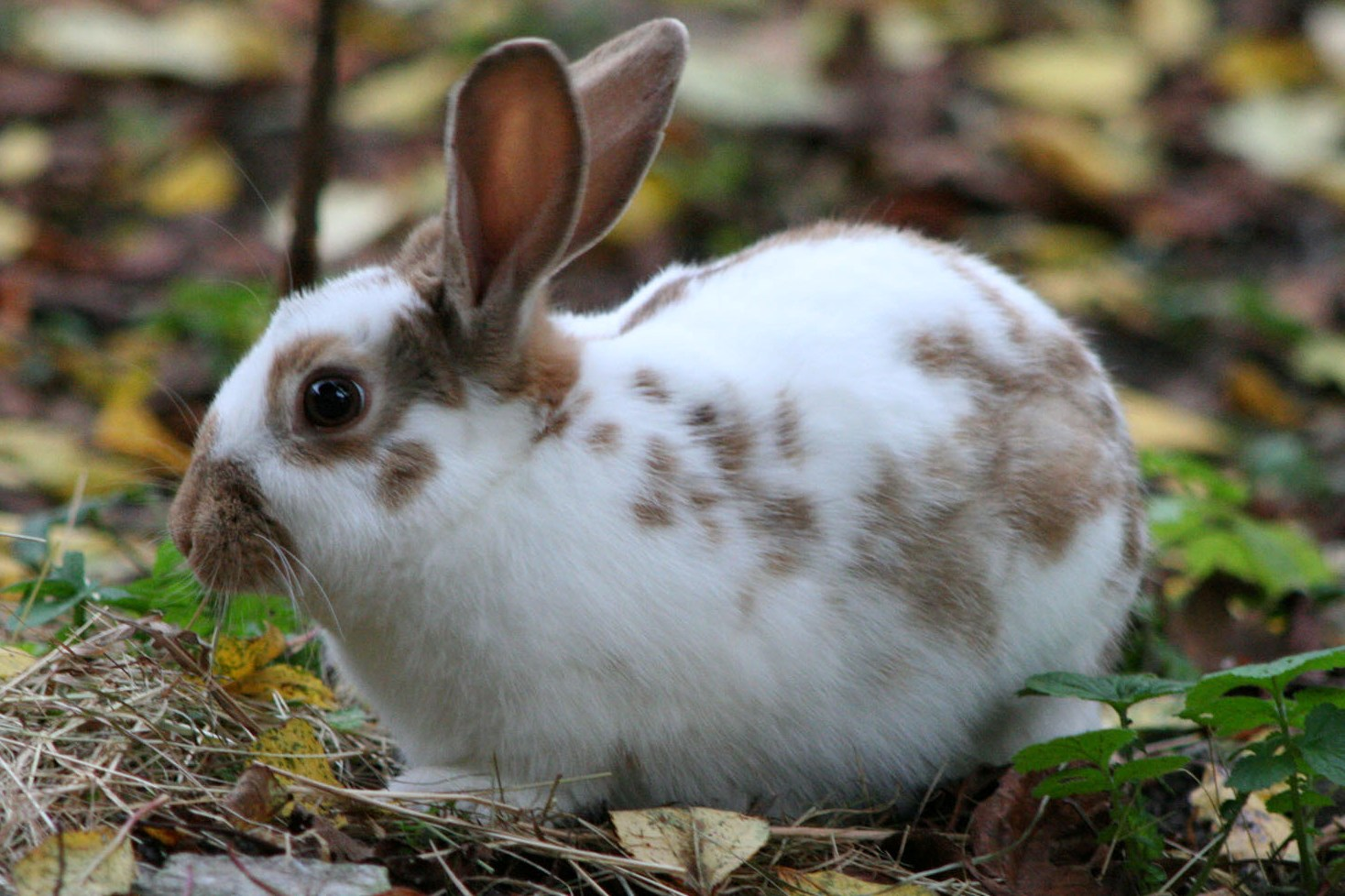

=== QI08AA Inactivated viral vaccines ===
QI08AA01 Rabbit haemorrhagic disease virus
QI08AA02 Rabbit distemper virus

=== QI08AB Inactivated bacterial vaccines (including mycoplasma, toxoid and chlamydia) ===
QI08AB01 Pasteurella + bordetella
QI08AB02 Pasteurella
QI08AB03 Clostridium

=== QI08AC Inactivated bacterial vaccines and antisera ===
Empty group

=== QI08AD Live viral vaccines ===
QI08AD01 Shope fibroma virus
QI08AD02 Myxomatosis virus

=== QI08AE Live bacterial vaccines ===
Empty group

=== QI08AF Live bacterial and viral vaccines ===
Empty group

=== QI08AG Live and inactivated bacterial vaccines ===
Empty group

=== QI08AH Live and inactivated viral vaccines ===
QI08AH01 Live myxomatosis virus + inactivated rabbit haemorrhagic disease virus

=== QI08AI Live viral and inactivated bacterial vaccines ===
Empty group

=== QI08AJ Live and inactivated viral and bacterial vaccines ===
Empty group

=== QI08AK Inactivated viral and live bacterial vaccines ===
Empty group

=== QI08AL Inactivated viral and inactivated bacterial vaccines ===
Empty group

=== QI08AM Antisera, immunoglobulin preparations, and antitoxins ===
Empty group

=== QI08AN Live parasitic vaccines ===
Empty group

=== QI08AO Inactivated parasitic vaccines ===
Empty group

=== QI08AP Live fungal vaccines ===
QI08AQ01 Trichophyton + microsporum

=== QI08AQ Inactivated fungal vaccines ===
Empty group

=== QI08AR In vivo diagnostic preparations ===
Empty group

=== QI08AS Allergens ===
Empty group

=== QI08AT Colostrum preparations and substitutes ===
Empty group

=== QI08AU Other live vaccines ===
Empty group

=== QI08AV Other inactivated vaccines ===
Empty group

=== QI08AX Other immunologicals ===
Empty group

== QI08B Hare ==
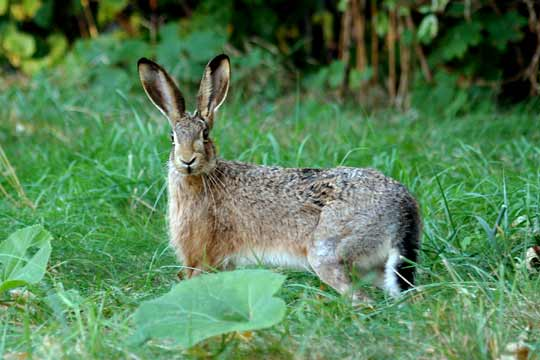

Empty group

== QI08X Leporidae, others ==
Empty group
