= ATCvet code QI11 =

Veterinary medical products classification subgroup

ATCvet code QI11 Immunologicals for rodents is a therapeutic subgroup of the Anatomical Therapeutic Chemical Classification System for veterinary medicinal products, a system of alphanumeric codes developed by the World Health Organization (WHO) for the classification of drugs and other medical products for veterinary use. Subgroup QI11 is part of the anatomical group QI Immunologicals.

National versions of the ATC classification may include additional codes not present in this list, which follows the WHO version.

== QI11A Rat ==
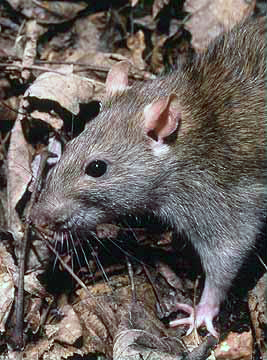

Empty group

== QI11B Mouse ==
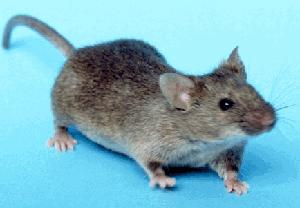

Empty group

== QI11C Guinea-pig ==
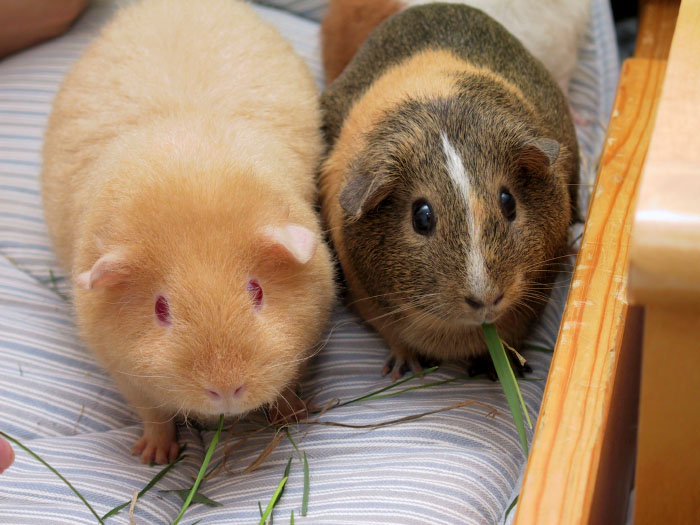

Empty group

== QI11X Rodents, others ==
Empty group
