= ATCvet code QI03 =

ATCvet code QI03 Immunologicals for Capridae (Note: The WHO named this subgroup "Immunologicals for Capridae" despite the fact that there is no zoological family of that name. Goats belong to the family Bovidae and the subfamily Caprinae.) is a therapeutic subgroup of the Anatomical Therapeutic Chemical Classification System for veterinary medicinal products, a system of alphanumeric codes developed by the World Health Organization (WHO) for the classification of drugs and other medical products for veterinary use. Subgroup QI03 is part of the anatomical group QI Immunologicals.

National versions of the ATC classification may include additional codes not present in this list, which follows the WHO version.

== QI03A Goat ==
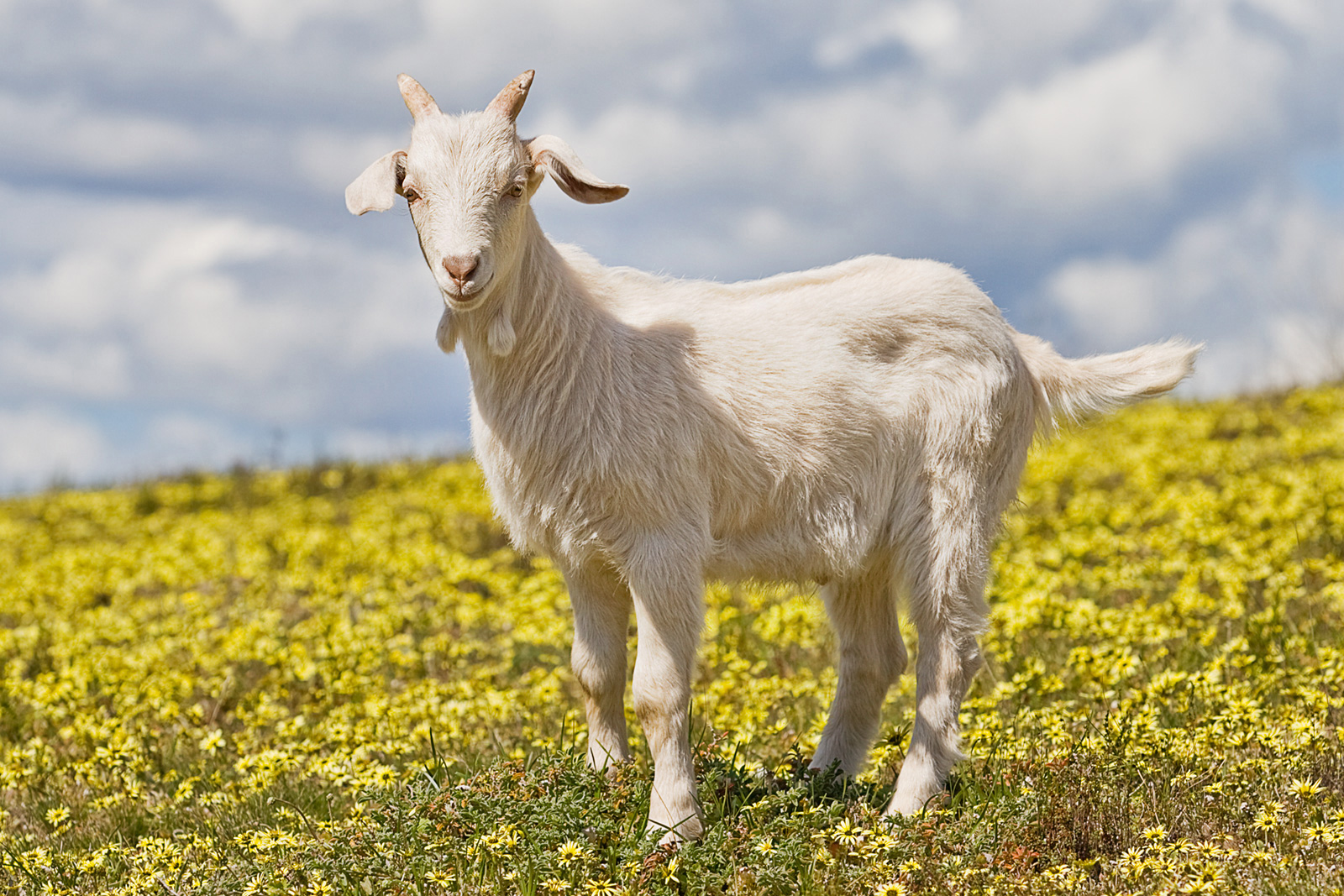

=== QI03AA Inactivated viral vaccines ===
Empty group

=== QI03AB Inactivated bacterial vaccines (including mycoplasma, toxoid and chlamydia) ===
QI03AB01 Mycobacterium

=== QI03AC Inactivated bacterial vaccines and antisera ===
Empty group

=== QI03AD Live viral vaccines ===
QI03AD01 Peste des petits ruminants (PPR)

=== QI03AE Live bacterial vaccines ===
QI03AE01 Mycobacterium

=== QI03AF Live bacterial and viral vaccines ===
Empty group

=== QI03AG Live and inactivated bacterial vaccines ===
Empty group

=== QI03AH Live and inactivated viral vaccines ===
Empty group

=== QI03AI Live viral and inactivated bacterial vaccines ===
Empty group

=== QI03AJ Live and inactivated viral and bacterial vaccines ===
Empty group

=== QI03AK Inactivated viral and live bacterial vaccines ===
Empty group

=== QI03AL Inactivated viral and inactivated bacterial vaccines ===
Empty group

=== QI03AM Antisera, immunoglobulin preparations, and antitoxins ===
Empty group

=== QI03AN Live parasitic vaccines ===
Empty group

=== QI03AO Inactivated parasitic vaccines ===
Empty group

=== QI03AP Live fungal vaccines ===
Empty group

=== QI03AQ Inactivated fungal vaccines ===
Empty group

=== QI03AR In vivo diagnostic preparations ===
Empty group

=== QI03AS Allergens ===
Empty group

=== QI03AT Colostrum preparations and substitutes ===
Empty group

=== QI03AU Other live vaccines ===
Empty group

=== QI03AV Other inactivated vaccines ===
Empty group

=== QI03AX Other immunologicals ===
Empty group

== QI03X Capridae, others ==
Empty group
