= Farmyard pox =

Viral disease transmitted from sheep and cattle

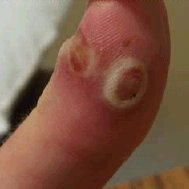
- Orf - a type of farmyard pox (thumb with two denuded orf lesions, following a bite by a sheep)
- Specialty: Infectious diseases
- Types: Bovine papular stomatitis, orf, milker's nodule

Farmyard pox is a group of closely related Parapoxviruses of sheep and cattle that can cause bovine papular stomatitis, orf and milker's nodule in humans.

== See also ==
- Skin lesion
