= ATCvet code QI04 =

Veterinary medical products classification subgroup

ATCvet code QI04 Immunologicals for Ovidae (Note: The WHO named this subgroup "Immunologicals for Ovidae" despite the fact that there is no zoological family of that name. Sheep belong to the family Bovidae, the subfamily Caprinae and the genus Ovis.) is a therapeutic subgroup of the Anatomical Therapeutic Chemical Classification System for veterinary medicinal products, a system of alphanumeric codes developed by the World Health Organization (WHO) for the classification of drugs and other medical products for veterinary use. Subgroup QI04 is part of the anatomical group QI Immunologicals.

National versions of the ATC classification may include additional codes not present in this list, which follows the WHO version.

== QI04A Sheep ==
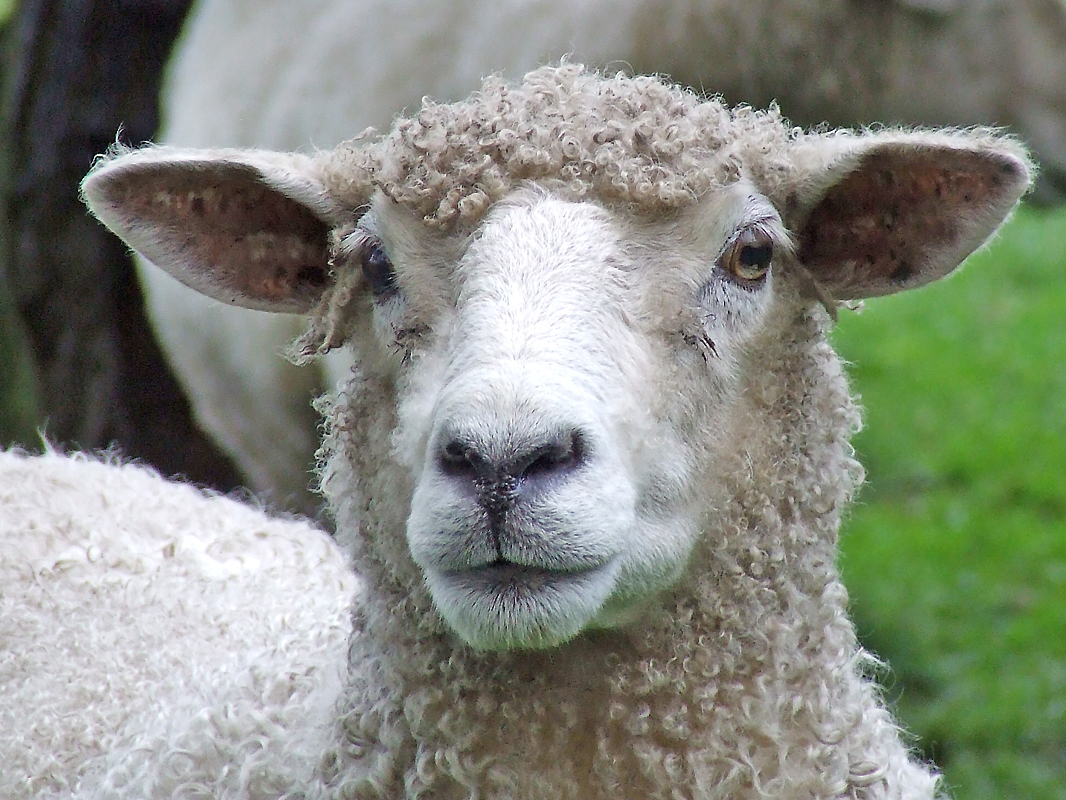

=== QI04AA Inactivated viral vaccines ===
QI04AA01 Louping ill virus
QI04AA02 Bluetongue virus

=== QI04AB Inactivated bacterial vaccines (including mycoplasma, toxoid and chlamydia) ===
QI04AB01 Clostridium
QI04AB02 Pasteurella
QI04AB03 Bacteroides
QI04AB04 Escherichia
QI04AB05 Clostridium + pasteurella
QI04AB06 Chlamydia
QI04AB08 Erysipelothrix
QI04AB09 Mycobacterium
QI04AB10 Staphylococcus

=== QI04AC Inactivated bacterial vaccines and antisera ===
Empty group

=== QI04AD Live viral vaccines ===
QI04AD01 Orf virus/contagious pustular dermatitis

=== QI04AE Live bacterial vaccines ===
QI04AE01 Chlamydia
QI04AE02 Listeria
QI04AE03 Mycobacterium

=== QI04AF Live bacterial and viral vaccines ===
Empty group

=== QI04AG Live and inactivated bacterial vaccines ===
Empty group

=== QI04AH Live and inactivated viral vaccines ===
Empty group

=== QI04AI Live viral and inactivated bacterial vaccines ===
Empty group

=== QI04AJ Live and inactivated viral and bacterial vaccines ===
Empty group

=== QI04AK Inactivated viral and live bacterial vaccines ===
Empty group

=== QI04AL Inactivated viral and inactivated bacterial vaccines ===
Empty group

=== QI04AM Antisera, immunoglobulin preparations, and antitoxins ===
QI04AM01 Pasteurella antiserum
QI04AM02 Clostridium antiserum

=== QI04AN Live parasitic vaccines ===
QI04AN01 Toxoplasma

=== QI04AO Inactivated parasitic vaccines ===
Empty group

=== QI04AP Live fungal vaccines ===
Empty group

=== QI04AQ Inactivated fungal vaccines ===
Empty group

=== QI04AR In vivo diagnostic preparations ===
Empty group

=== QI04AS Allergens ===
Empty group

=== QI04AT Colostrum preparations and substitutes ===
Empty group

=== QI04AU Other live vaccines ===
Empty group

=== QI04AV Other inactivated vaccines ===
Empty group

=== QI04AX Other immunologicals ===
Empty group

== QI04X Ovidae, others ==
Empty group
