= Milker's nodule =

Symptom of viral infection transmitted from cows

- Other names: Milkmaid blisters
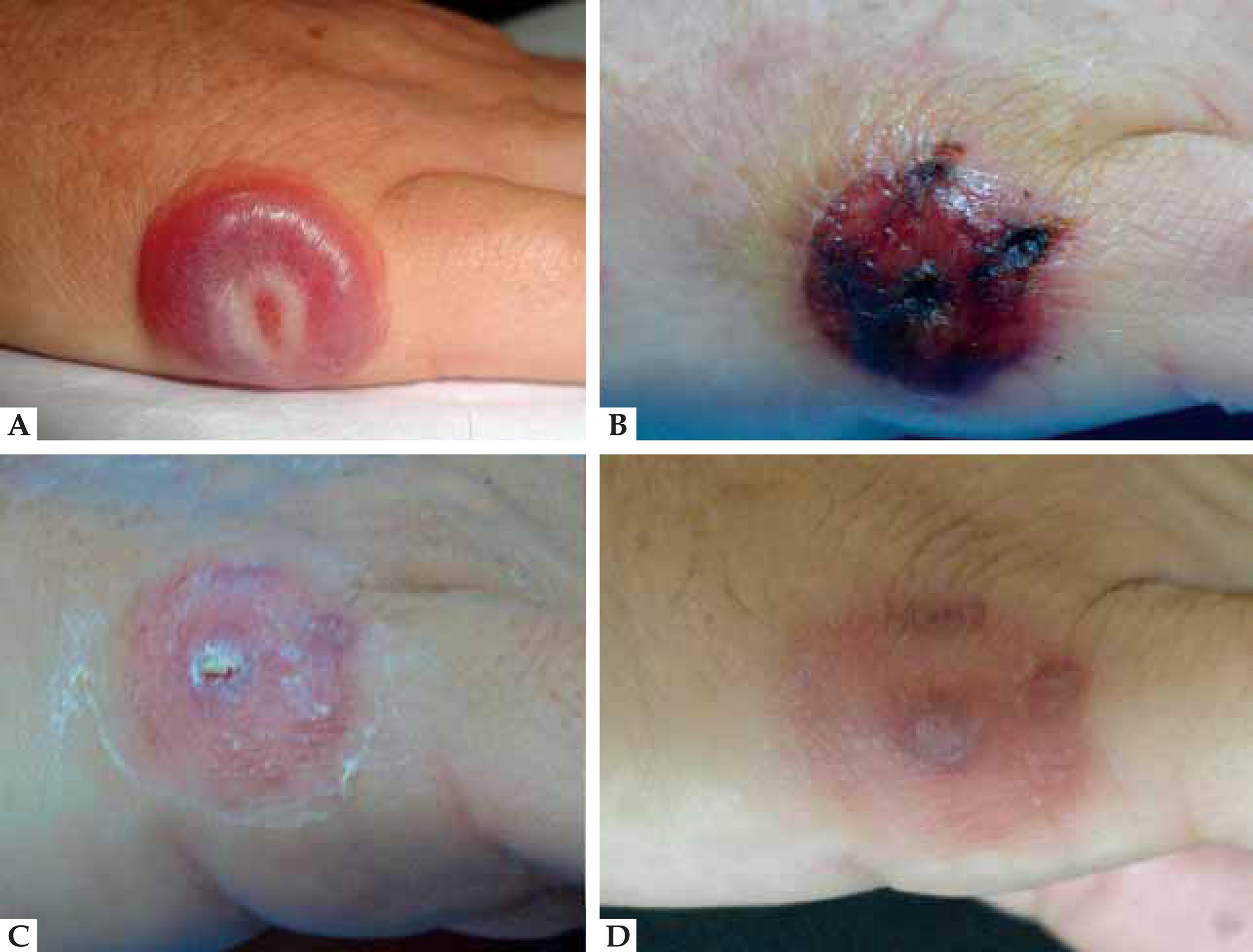
- Human skin infection of paravaccinia virus.
- Specialty: Infectious diseases

Milker's nodules are a cutaneous condition that is most commonly transmitted from the udders of infected cows. Milker's nodule is caused by Paravaccinia virus. The disease in humans is nearly identical to Orf.

== Pathogen ==
Milker's nodules is a zoonotic dermatosis. It was caused by double-stranded DNA virus of the Parapoxvirus genus. Parapoxvirus usually presents in the saliva, nasal secretions, and in lesions over the udder, trunk, and limbs of affected bovine cattle. It may transmitted by direct or indirect contact of lesion.

== See also ==
- Farmyard pox
- List of cutaneous conditions
