= Red deerpox virus =

Virus classification
- (unranked): Virus
- Realm: Varidnaviria
- Kingdom: Bamfordvirae
- Phylum: Nucleocytoviricota
- Class: Pokkesviricetes
- Order: Chitovirales
- Family: Poxviridae
- Genus: Parapoxvirus
- Species: Parapoxvirus reddeerpox

Synonyms
- Parapoxvirus of red deer in New Zealand

Species of virus

Red deerpox virus (RDPV) is a species of virus in the genus Parapoxvirus. It has been reported in deer in New Zealand, and in wild ruminants in Italy.

In 1987, deaths among infected deer occurred on two Red Deer farms in New Zealand where secondary bacterial infections were seen alongside the lesions. In these particular cases, morbidity rates reached 100%.

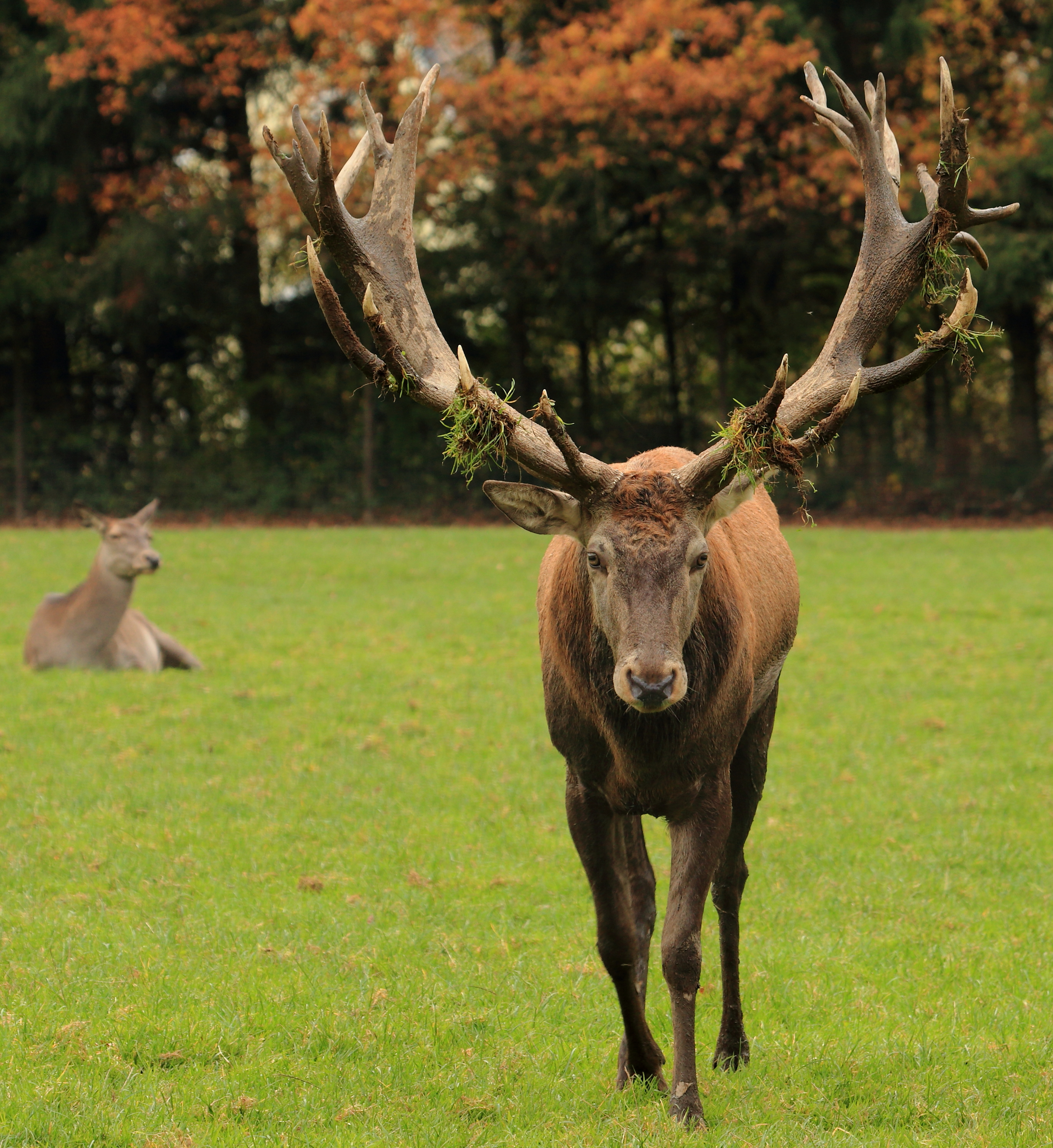
Red Deer of New Zealand

== Viral classification ==
RDPV was classified as a separate species due to its unique patterns of restriction enzymes.

Parapoxviruses belongs to the family of viruses named Poxviridae, family of double-stranded DNA viruses. Parapoxvirus is classified into the subfamily of Chordopoxvirinae.

=== Virion size ===
Generally, viruses within the Poxviridae family have brick or oval-shaped virions. Sizes range from between 140-260 nanometres in width and 220-450 nanometres in length. They are enveloped viruses with tubular, or globular, units on the surface of the envelope.

== Structure ==
Parapoxvirus virions are large in comparison to a majority of the other Poxviridae virions. Virions are the complete form of a virus outside of the host cell that is capable of infection. Virions contain a core of RNA or DNA within a capsid. A capsid is the protein shell of a virus. Parapoxvirus virions are typically 260 x 160 nanometers in size. They possess an enveloped capsid and a distinguishing spiral coat, which is composed of a crossing pattern of tubes. Dissecting a Parapoxvirus virion from the outside in, after passing through the either the EV envelope or the MV membrane (depending on the infectious virus particle, see bullets below) is the lateral body, its function is unknown. After this comes the core wall which is followed by the nucleocapsid. The nucleocapsid is simply the capsid of the Parapoxvirus that is enclosed in nucleic acid. Surprisingly, parapoxviruses have considerably smaller genomes that other genera of the family Poxviridae, (85 MDA).

Parapoxvirus Virus with scale

Parapoxviruses have two different infectious virus particles:

- the intracellular mature virus (IMV)
- the extracellular enveloped virus (EEV)

== Genome ==
RDPV has a linear, double-stranded DNA genome. The length of the genome ranges from 130 to 150 kilobases. The linear genome is flanked by inverted terminal repeat (ITR) sequences which are covalently-closed at their extremities.

=== Replication and transcription ===
- Viral proteins attach to the host glycosaminoglycans (GAGs). This brings about endocytosis which allows the virus penetration of the host cell.
- The virion then fuses with the plasma membrane of the host cell and releases its core into the cytoplasm of the host cell.
- Early Phase: In the cytoplasm, early genes are transcribed by viral RNA polymerase. This occurs half an hour after the initial infection.
- Intermediate Phase: Intermediate genes are expressed after the early genes. This triggers genomic DNA replication. This usually occurs 100 minutes post-infection.
- Late Phase: Between 140 minutes and 48 hours post-infection, late genes are expressed. All structural proteins have now been completed.
- An immature spherical particle is assembled in cytoplasmic viral factories.
- It then matures into the brick-shaped intracellulare mature virion (IMV)
- IMV virion is released upon cell lysis or it can bad after forming an external enveloped virion (EEV). To do this the IMV virion must receive a second double membrane from the Golgi apparatus.

=== Assembly and release ===
Assembly occurs within the cytoplasm of the host cell. Release occurs via budding of a membranous vesicle and ultimately results in lysis. The host cell is denigrated after the cell's membrane is ruptured upon virus' exit.

== Disease in deer ==
RDPV causes scabby lesions on the face, lips, ears and velvet of deer. Deer recover in two to three weeks. Animals under two years of age are more often affected than older deer.

== Transmission ==
RDPV can infect ungulates (hoofed animals) and humans, and can be transmitted sexually and non-sexually.

=== Outbreak in Italy ===
In order to characterize the strains of parapoxviruses causing severe disease in wild ruminants in Stelvio Park, Italy, sequencing and comparisons of isolated DNA were conducted. Results demonstrated that the red deer isolates are closely related to Red deerpox virus.
