= Paravaccinia virus =

Pseudocowpox virus

Virus classification
- (unranked): Virus
- Realm: Varidnaviria
- Kingdom: Bamfordvirae
- Phylum: Nucleocytoviricota
- Class: Pokkesviricetes
- Order: Chitovirales
- Family: Poxviridae
- Genus: Parapoxvirus
- Species: Parapoxvirus pseudocowpox

Synonyms
- Milker’s nodule virus; Paravaccinia virus

Virus that causes Pseudocowpox

Pseudocowpox is a disease caused by the Paravaccinia virus or Pseudocowpox virus, a virus of the family Poxviridae and the genus Parapoxvirus. Humans can contract the virus from contact with livestock infected with Bovine papular stomatitis and the disease is common among ranchers, milkers, and veterinarians. Infection in humans will present with fever, fatigue, and lesion on the skin.

== Signs and symptoms ==
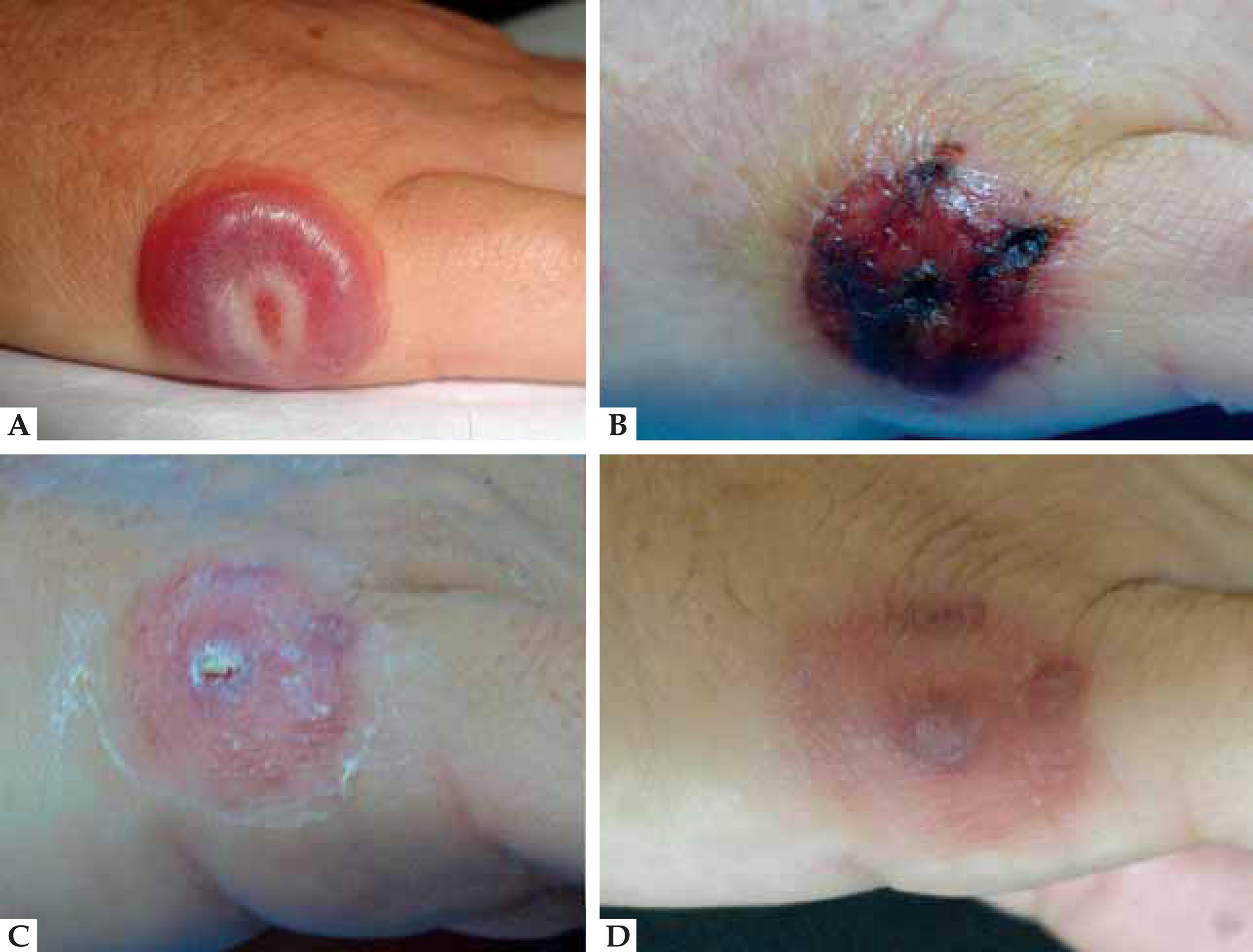
Human skin infected with paravaccinia virus.

Paravaccinia virus presents itself with blisters, nodules, or lesions about 4 mm in diameter, typically in the area that has made contact with livestock that is infected with bovine papular stomatitis. Lesions may begin forming as late as three weeks after contact has been made with an infected animal. In rare cases, lesions may be seen systemic. General signs of infection are also common, such as fever and fatigue.

Infected livestock may present with blisters or lesions on their udders or snout. Often, however, infected livestock show little to no symptoms.

== Mechanism ==
Paravaccinia is a member of the Parapoxvirus genus. It has a cylindrical body about 140 X 310 nm in size, with convex ends covered in a criss-cross pattern of rope like structures. The virus is resistant to cold, dehydration, and temperatures up to 56 °C. Upon injecting a cell with its genome, the virus begins transcription in the cytoplasm using viral RNA polymerase. As the virus progresses through the cell, the host begins to replicate the viral genome between 140 minutes and 48 hours.

== Diagnosis ==
Diagnosis of paravaccinia virus will often come from Polymerase chain reaction screening ordered by their physician. However, due to how common paravaccinia virus is in rural areas, individuals typically do not seek professional help in diagnosis. Instead individuals may refer to people with local knowledge of the cattle in their area such as ranchers, or veterinarians who have some familiarity with the infections in the region.

It may appear similar to cowpox and orf.

== Cause and prevention ==
Paravaccinia virus originates from livestock infected with bovine papular stomatitis. When a human makes physical contact with the livestock's muzzle, udders, or an infected area, the area of contact will become infected. Livestock may not show symptoms of bovine papular stomatitis and still be infected and contagious. Paravaccinia can enter the body though all pathways including: skin contact by mechanical means, through the respiratory tract, or orally. Oral or respiratory contraction may be more likely to cause systemic symptoms such as lesions across the whole body

A person who has not previously been infected with paravaccinia virus should avoid contact with infected livestock to prevent contraction of disease. There is no commercially available vaccination for cattle or humans against paravaccinia. However, following infection, immunization has been noted in humans, making re-infection difficult. Unlike other pox viruses, there is no record of contracting paravaccinia virus from another human. Further, cattle only show a short immunization after initial infection, providing opportunity to continue to infect more livestock and new human hosts.

== Treatment and prognosis ==
Lesions of paravaccinia virus will clear up with little to no scarring after 4 to 8 weeks. An antibiotic may be prescribed by a physician to help prevent bacterial infection of the lesion area. In rare cases, surgical removal of the lesions can be done to help increase rate of healing, and help minimize risk of bacterial or fungal infection. Upon healing, no long term side effects have been reported.

== History ==
Paravaccinia virus was first characterized in by Edward Jenner in 1799 with the presence of lesions on humans, later described as Milker's nodule. Jenner associated the lesions found on human who had contact with infected cattle. Since first being characterized in cows, bovine papular stomatitis has been isolated in sheep, goats, and red deer creating new potential sources for human infection. Bolvine papular stomatitis has been reported in the United States of America, Great Britain, Brazil, Switzerland, and Japan.

== Disease in animals ==
Pseudocowpox is a worldwide disease of cattle. Symptoms include ring or horseshoe shaped scabs on the teats, which usually heal within six weeks. Lesions may also develop on the muzzles and in the mouths of nursing calves. Spread is by fomites, including hands, calves' mouths, and milking machines.

Lesions may also appear on the hands of milkers, a clinical presentation known as milker's nodule. This disease in humans is nearly identical to orf.
