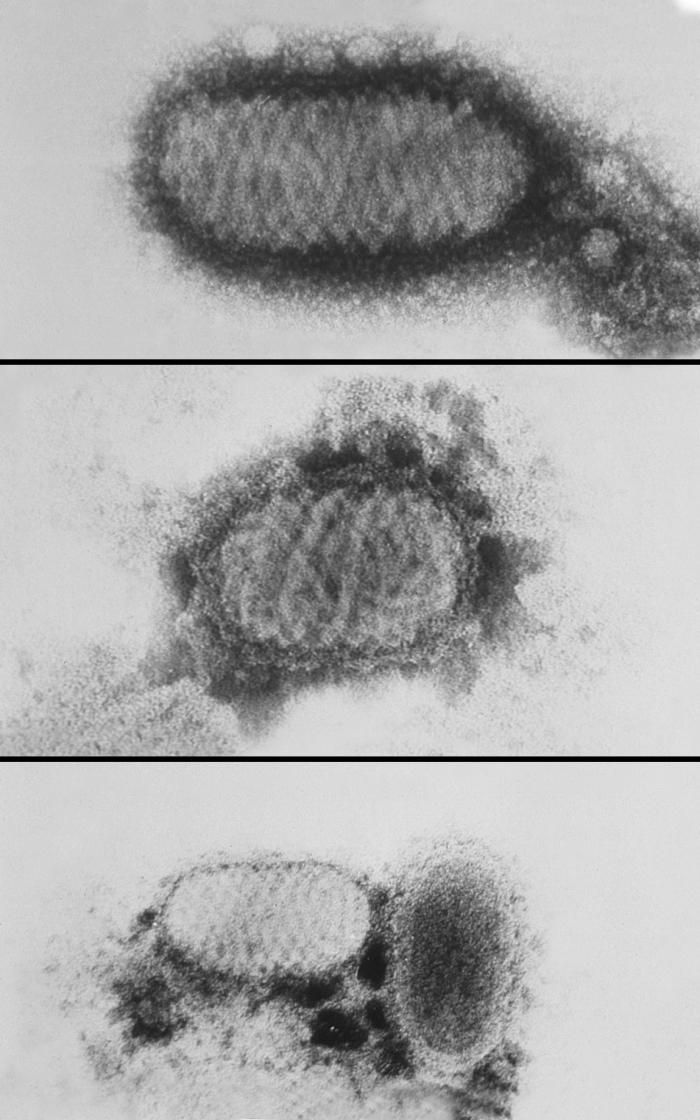
- electron micrograph depicting morphologic variants of Orf virus

Virus classification
- (unranked): Virus
- Realm: Varidnaviria
- Kingdom: Bamfordvirae
- Phylum: Nucleocytoviricota
- Class: Pokkesviricetes
- Order: Chitovirales
- Family: Poxviridae
- Subfamily: Chordopoxvirinae
- Genus: Parapoxvirus

Species
- See text

= Parapoxvirus =

Genus of viruses

Parapoxvirus is a genus of viruses, in the family Poxviridae, in the subfamily Chordopoxvirinae. Like all members of the family Poxviridae, they are oval, relatively large, double-stranded DNA viruses. Parapoxviruses have a unique spiral coat that distinguishes them from other poxviruses. Parapoxviruses infect vertebrates, including a wide selection of mammals, and humans.

Not all parapoxviruses are zoonotic. Notable zoonotic hosts of parapoxviruses include sheep, goats, and cattle.

The most recent species of parapoxviruses has been found in New Zealand red deer. There are also some tentative species in the genus, including Auzduk disease virus, Chamois contagious ecthyma virus, and sealpox virus.

== Structure ==
Viruses in Parapoxvirus are enveloped, with ovoid geometries. These viruses are about 140–170 nm wide and 220–300 nm long, and have a regular surface structure; tubules with a diameter of 10–20 nm form a criss-cross pattern. Genomes are linear, around 130–150kb in length.

Genus	Structure	Symmetry	Capsid	Genomic arrangement	Genomic segmentation
Parapoxvirus	Ovoid		Enveloped	Linear	Monopartite

== Life cycle ==
Viral replication is cytoplasmic. Entry into the host cell is achieved by attachment of the viral proteins to host glycosaminoglycans (GAGs) mediates endocytosis of the virus into the host cell. Fusion occurs with the plasma membrane to release the core into the host cytoplasm. Early phase: early genes are transcribed in the cytoplasm by viral RNA polymerase. Early expression begins at 30 minutes post-infection. The viral core is completely uncoated as early expression ends, and the viral genome is now free in the cytoplasm. Intermediate phase: Intermediate genes are expressed, triggering genomic DNA replication at approximately 100 minutes post-infection. Late phase: Late genes are expressed from 140 min to 48 hours post-infection, producing all structural proteins. Assembly of progeny virions starts in cytoplasmic viral factories, producing a spherical immature particle. This virus particle matures into brick-shaped intracellular mature virion (IMV). The IMV can be released upon cell lysis, or can acquire a second double membrane from trans-Golgi and bud as external enveloped virion (EEV) host receptors, which mediates endocytosis. Replication follows the DNA strand displacement model. DNA-templated transcription is the method of transcription. The virus exits the host cell by existing in occlusion bodies after cell death and remaining infectious until finding another host. Humans and mammals serve as the natural hosts. Transmission routes are zoonosis and contact.

Genus	Host details	Tissue tropism	Entry details	Release details	Replication site	Assembly site	Transmission
Parapoxvirus	Humans; mammals	None	Glycosaminoglycans	Lysis; budding	Cytoplasm	Cytoplasm	Zoonosis; contact

== Taxonomy ==
The genus contains the following species, listed by scientific name and followed by the exemplar virus of the species:

- Parapoxvirus bovinestomatitis, Bovine papular stomatitis virus
- Parapoxvirus orf, Orf virus
- Parapoxvirus pseudocowpox, Pseudocowpox virus
- Parapoxvirus reddeerpox, Parapoxvirus red deer
- Parapoxvirus sealpox, Seal parapoxvirus

== Impact ==
Parapoxviruses cause infection of cows, sheep, goats, and red squirrels worldwide. They tend to cause lesions that range in size depending on the case. Between 1990 and 1995, there was an average of 15 cases reported annually. This is a significant decline from the annual mean of 46 cases between 1968 and 1978.

Some authors believe that the infection is much more common than reported, as it may not appear to be a serious infection.

== Seasonal fluctuations ==
Most reports indicate a higher frequency of human infections during the spring and autumn, presumably due to the seasonal slaughtering of susceptible animals. However, others show a higher occurrence in winter. This may be attributed to the use of gorse, an animal feed that may cause trauma, thereby leading to infection.

== See also ==
- Sealpox virus
