= Orf (disease) =

Viral infection of sheep and goats

- Other names: Contagious pustular dermatitis, contagious ecthyma, infectious labial dermatitis, ecthyma contagiosum, thistle disease, scabby mouth
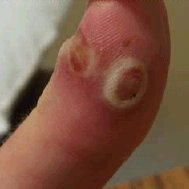
- A thumb with two denuded orf lesions, following a bite by a sheep
- Specialty: Infectious diseases, veterinary medicine

Orf is also called contagious ecthyma, sore mouth disease it is a farmyard pox, and a type of zoonosis. It is caused by a member of the genus Parapoxvirus in the family Poxviridae. Orf virus has an ovoid-shaped virions of ~ 260 by 160 nm and a linear double-stranded DNA genome of 134–139 kb. The Orf virus primarily affects sheep and goats worldwide. Infection can causes small pustules in the skin of primarily sheep and goats, but can also occur on the hands of humans. A pale halo forms around a red centre. It may persist for several weeks before crusting and then either resolves or leaves a granuloma. There is usually only one non-painful lesion, but there can be more. Lymph nodes may also become swollen. Transmission of Orf to humans typically occurs through direct contact with animals exhibiting active lesions. Activities such as feeding, petting and getting bitten by an infected animal increase the risk of infection One-third of cases may develop erythema multiforme. Once resolved, a person can still be infected again. Generally, once infected, treatment options are limited. Injecting the lesion with cidofovir or applying imiquimod has been studied. However, it is sometimes required to excise the pustules.

The vaccine used in sheep to prevent orf is live and has been known to cause disease in humans. Contagious ecthyma endemic in livestock herds worldwide and is more common in late summer, fall and winter on pasture and in feedlots . A recent outbreak emerged in southwest Ethiopia between October 2019 and May 2020. Orf is also being trialed as a potential and potent viral vector vaccine platform.

== Humans ==
Orf is a zoonotic disease, meaning humans can contract this disorder through direct contact with infected sheep and goats or with fomites carrying the orf virus. It was described in 1934 by Newson and Cross. Orf is recognized as an occupational zoonosis disease among individuals who work closely with sheep and goats, including shepherds, shearers, veterinarians, butchers, and cooks.It causes a purulent-appearing papule locally and generally no systemic symptoms. Infected locations can include the finger, hand, arm, and face. Consequently, good personal hygiene is essential when handling infected animals. Rubber or latex gloves should be worn, especially when cuts or open wounds are present on the hands or when handling the animal’s mouth or muzzle. Hands should be washed thoroughly with soap and warm water for at least 20 seconds, especially when visibly dirty. If soap and water are unavailable and the hands are not visibly dirty, an alcohol-based hand sanitizer should be used. It may appear similar to cowpox and pseudocowpox.

Orf virus
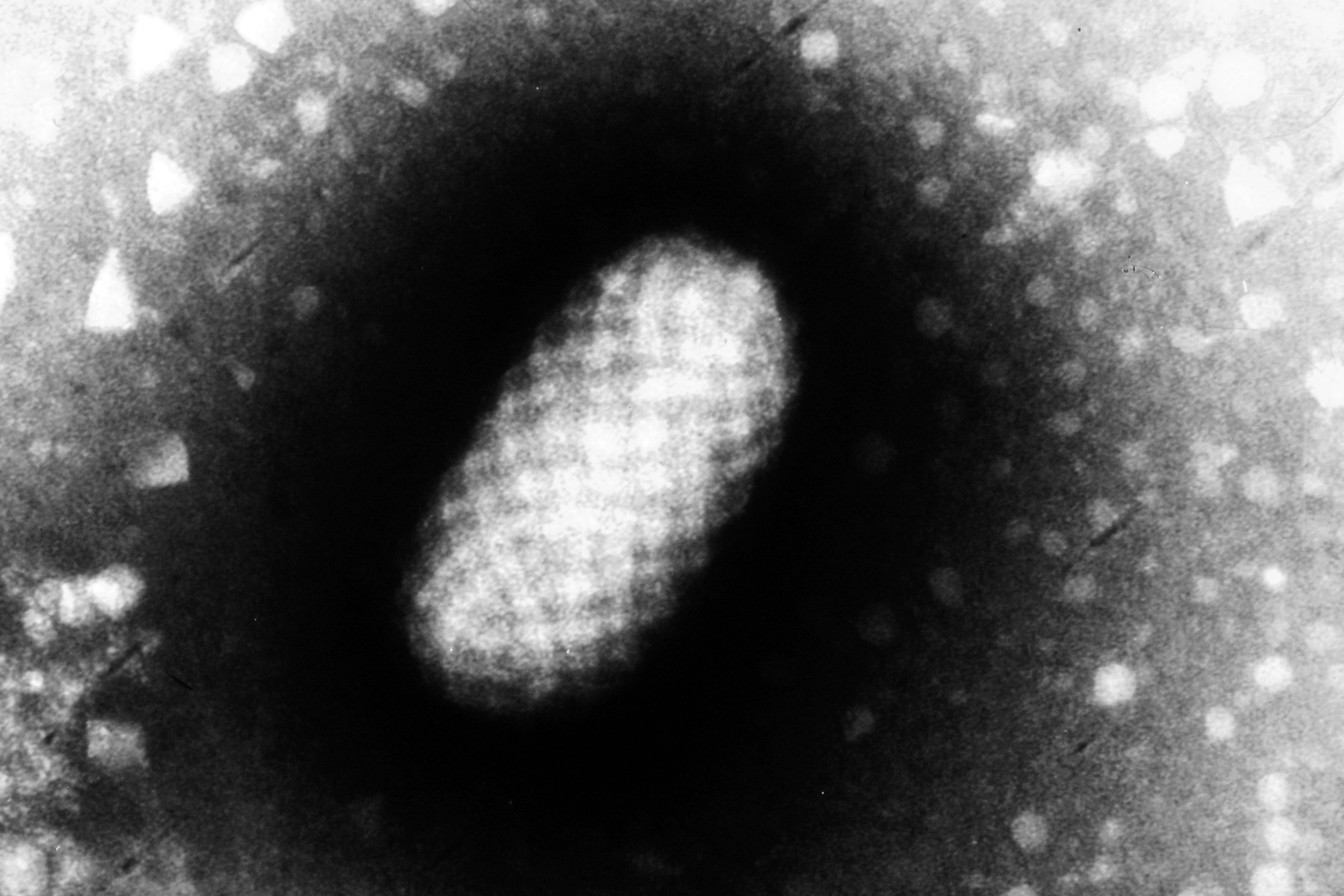

Virus classification
- (unranked): Virus
- Realm: Varidnaviria
- Kingdom: Bamfordvirae
- Phylum: Nucleocytoviricota
- Class: Pokkesviricetes
- Order: Chitovirales
- Family: Poxviridae
- Genus: Parapoxvirus
- Species: Parapoxvirus orf

While orf is usually a benign self-limiting illness which resolves in 3–6 weeks, in the immunocompromised it can be very progressive and even life-threatening. One percent topical cidofovir has been successfully used in a few patients with progressive disease. Serious damage may be inflicted on the eye if it is infected by orf, even among otherwise healthy patients. The virus can survive in the soil for at least six months.

== Other animals ==
Orf is primarily a disease of sheep and goats although it has been reported as a natural disease in humans, steenbok and alpacas, chamois and tahrs, reindeer, musk oxen, dogs, cats, mountain goats, bighorn sheep, dall sheep, and red squirrels.

== Sheep and goats ==
The Orf virus has been recorded since the late 19th century and has been reported from most sheep-or goat-raising areas, including those in Europe, the Middle East, the United States, Africa, Asia, South America, Canada, New Zealand and Australia. Orf is spread by fomites and direct contact. Infected animals shed Orf virus in fluid from skin lesions and scabs. The virus can enter the body of another animal through breaks in the skin, such as cuts, abrasions, or scratches. Nursing lambs or kids may also transmit the virus to the teats of their mothers. Direct contact between animals, including muzzle-to-muzzle or skin-to-skin contact, can facilitate transmission. In some environments, infection is injected by scratches from thistles of both growing and felled plants. Symptoms of orf viral infection includes the proliferation of cutaneous lesions in the oral mucosa including papules and pustules on the lips and muzzle, and less commonly in the mouth of young lambs and on the eyelids, feet, and teats of ewes. Infections that involve the oral cavity can lead to erosive to ulcerative stomatitis, affecting the gums, palate, and tongue. The lesions progress to thick crusts which may bleed. Orf in the mouths of lambs may prevent suckling and cause weight loss, and can infect the udder of the mother ewe, thus potentially leading to mastitis. Sheep are prone to reinfection.Boer goats may be more susceptible to infection and can develop more severe disease. Reinfection can occur throughout an animal’s life, typically after at least a year, with subsequent infections generally being milder Understanding the evolutionary origins and molecular epidemiology of Orf virus is essential for developing effective control and potential eradication strategies. Occasionally the infection can be extensive and persistent if the animal does not produce an immune response. Vaccination strategies against Orf virus vary by breed and geographical region. In some countries, such as Australia, vaccination has been used successfully to control the infection. Most animals recover from orf infection within a month.

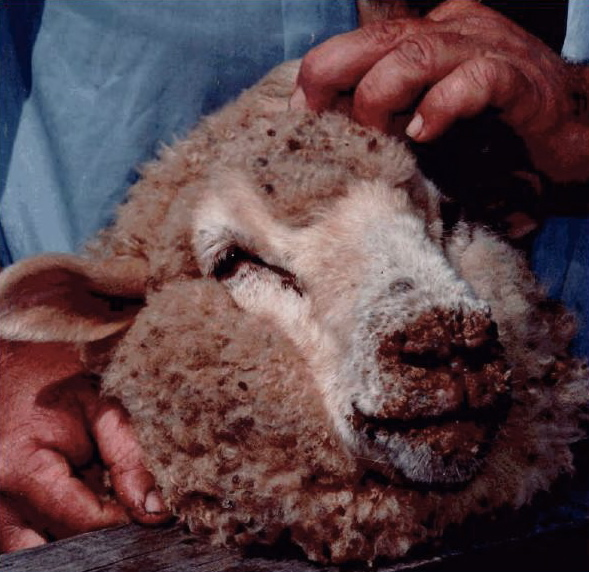
A sheep with signs of orf infection on nose and lips. Note the reddish discoloration.

A live virus vaccine (ATCvet code: QI04AD01 (WHO)) is made from scab material and usually given to ewes at the age of two months, but typically only given to lambs when there is a confirmed outbreak. The vaccine can cause minor cases of orf when used in humans. While vaccination is an effective strategy for preventing Orf viral infection; its efficacy may be limited by genetic variations in circulating strains, which can reduce protection against reinfection following the use of inactivated or attenuated vaccines under existing immune pressure.

In sheep and goats, the lesions mostly appear on or near the hairline and elsewhere on the lips and muzzle. In some cases the lesions appear on and in the nostrils, around the eyes, on the thigh, coronet, vulva, udder, and axilla. In rare cases, mostly involving young lambs, lesions are found on the tongue, gums, roof of the mouth and the esophagus. It has also been reported a number of times to cause lesions in the rumen. In one case it was shown that a severe form of orf virus caused an outbreak involving the gastrointestinal tract, lungs, heart, as well as the buccal cavity, cheeks, tongue and lips. Another severe case was reported pharyngitis, genital lesions and infection of the hooves which led to lameness and, in some cases, sloughing of the hoof.

Sheep custodians can assist by ensuring infected lambs receive sufficient milk and separating out the infected stock to slow down cross-transmission to healthy animals. It is advisable for those handling infected animals to wear disposable gloves to prevent cross infection and self-infection. A veterinarian must be contacted if there is a risk of misdiagnosis with other, more serious conditions. Orf viral disease can lead to welfare and significant economic impact to the livestock industry causing around $150 million in annual losses

== Differential diagnosis ==
Before clinically diagnosing orf virus infection, other diseases that produce similar visible lesions, including sheeppox, foot-and-mouth disease, bluetongue, peste des petits ruminants cutaneous anthrax and vesicular diseases, should be ruled out.

== One Health perspective ==
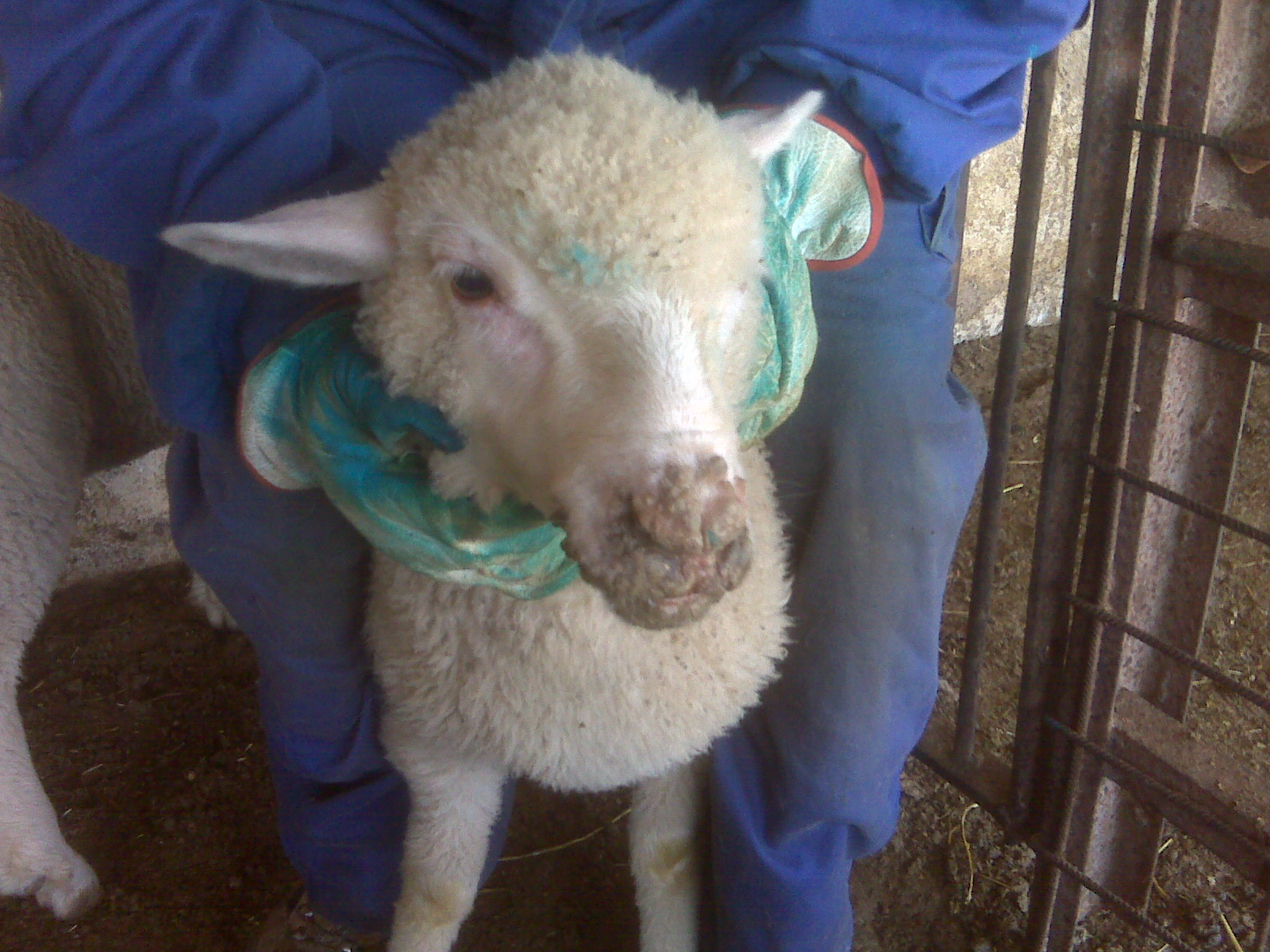
A sheep with signs of orf virus (contagious ecthyma). Monitoring livestock is a key part of the One Health approach to preventing zoonotic spread.

Orf is a classic One Health challenge involving interactions among the environment, livestock, and humans. The virus is highly resistant to physical factors; it can survive in dry soil or on farm equipment for several months to years, even after infected animals have been removed. This environmental persistence creates a reservoir for future outbreaks. Because the virus is zoonotic, protecting animal health through vaccination and biosecurity directly protects the health of the farming community and the local economy. The measures listed below are ways that can be employed for the management of this disease.

1. Pasture management: Remove thistles and thorny vegetation to minimize skin injuries that facilitate viral entry.

2. Feeding hygiene: Clean and disinfect shared feeding troughs on a regular basis.

3. Housing sanitation: Disinfect animal housing and livestock management facilities frequently.

4. Biosecurity practices: Wash hands thoroughly and disinfect equipment between handling infected and healthy animals.

5. Quarantine procedures: Isolate newly introduced animals until orf infection has been ruled out.

6. Event monitoring: Examine animals’ mouths for lesions during public events, livestock shows, or exhibitions to identify potentially infected animals

== Further studies to address the gaps ==
Despite its global prevalence in sheep and goats and its substantial economic and animal welfare impacts, contagious ecthyma remains relatively understudied. Future research on the Orf virus should focus on establishing standardized epidemiological surveillance systems, conducting genomic characterization of circulating strains, and assessing vaccine effectiveness across diverse sheep and goat populations. Additional studies are needed to develop accessible diagnostic tools, explore environmental persistence, and evaluate the impact of farm level biosecurity practices. Research should also aim to quantify the economic and animal welfare consequences of infection and enhance understanding of occupational exposure and zoonotic transmission pathways. Integrating veterinary, human health, and environmental surveillance within a One Health framework will strengthen disease monitoring, reveal critical knowledge gaps, and support more effective prevention and control strategies.

== See also ==
- Ecthyma
- List of cutaneous conditions
- List of immunofluorescence findings for autoimmune bullous conditions
- Imiquimod
- Cidofovir
