= ATCvet code QI =

ATCvet code QI Immunologicals is a section of the Anatomical Therapeutic Chemical Classification System for veterinary medicinal products, a system of alphanumeric codes developed by the World Health Organization (WHO) for the classification of drugs and other medical products for veterinary use.

National issues of the ATC classification may include additional codes not present in this list, which follows the WHO version.

== See also ==
- Immune sera and immunoglobulins for human use are in the ATC group J06.
- Vaccines for human use are in the ATC group J07.
