= 2026 in the United Kingdom =

Events from the year 2026 in the United Kingdom.

== Incumbents ==
- Monarch – Charles III
- Prime Minister
  - Keir Starmer (Labour) (until 20 July)
  - Andy Burnham (Labour) (starting 20 July)

== Events ==
=== January ===
- 1 January
  - Scotland's "Not Proven" verdict is abolished in all new trials with the jury majority required for a conviction also changing, moving from the current simple majority to at least two-thirds of the 15 jurors.
  - Figures indicate that 41,472 migrants crossed the English Channel during 2025, almost 5,000 more than 2024, and the highest annual number since 2022.
- 2 January
  - The FTSE 100 rises above 10,000 points for the first time in its history.
  - The MMRV vaccine, designed to protect children against measles, mumps, rubella (German measles), and varicella (chickenpox), is made available on the NHS throughout the UK.
  - An amber weather alert for snow, which came into force for Scotland from midday, is extended until Monday 5 January, while there are yellow warnings for snow and ice for parts of England and Wales.
- 3 January
  - Luke Littler wins the 2026 PDC World Darts Championship, his second consecutive PDC World Darts Championship victory, after defeating Gian van Veen 7-1.
  - The Ministry of Defence announces that RAF Typhoon jets took part in a joint airstrike with France on a suspected underground arms cache in Syria that was previously used by ISIS.
- 4 January – The Met Office issues fresh warnings for snow and ice across the UK on Monday 5 January as people return to work and school following the Christmas break. An amber weather alert for fresh snow is also issued for northern Scotland.
- 5 January
  - New powers come into force allowing mobile phones belonging to illegal migrants to be seized without their arrest.
  - A ban on junk food advertising comes into effect, as part of a drive to tackle childhood obesity. This affects TV adverts shown before 9pm and online adverts at any time.
- 6 January
  - The UK experiences its coldest night of the winter so far, with temperatures reaching as low as −12.5 °C (9.5 °F) in Marham, Norfolk. Snow and ice warnings continue to affect much of the country, closing more than 1,000 schools and causing widespread travel disruption.
  - The Met Office issues a fresh yellow warning for ice and snow for much of the UK ahead of the arrival of Storm Goretti. Snow is forecast for the UK for the 6 and 7 January, and for England and Wales for the 8 and 9 January.
  - Technology Secretary Liz Kendall demands that social media company X deals with deepfake nudes generated by its Grok AI model, and says that Ofcom is now "looking into this as a matter of urgency."
  - The UK and France sign a declaration of intent, during talks in Paris, to send peacekeeping troops to Ukraine if a peace agreement is signed with Russia.
- 7 January
  - The Ministry of Defence confirms that British armed forces supported the US seizure of a Russian-flagged oil tanker in the North Atlantic.
  - The UK government proposes that learner drivers wait six months between taking their theory test and their practical test as part of plans to improve road safety.
- 8 January
  - A red "danger to life" wind warning is issued by the Met Office for south-west England as Storm Goretti heads towards the UK, with gusts expected to surpass 100 mph in some areas.
  - Tougher rules for people applying to come to the UK on skilled worker or scale-up visas begin.
  - The UK government announces it will make changes to plans to increase business rates for pubs.
  - A review finds that two serial rapists were among 131 Metropolitan Police officers and staff who committed crimes or misconduct after they were not properly vetted.
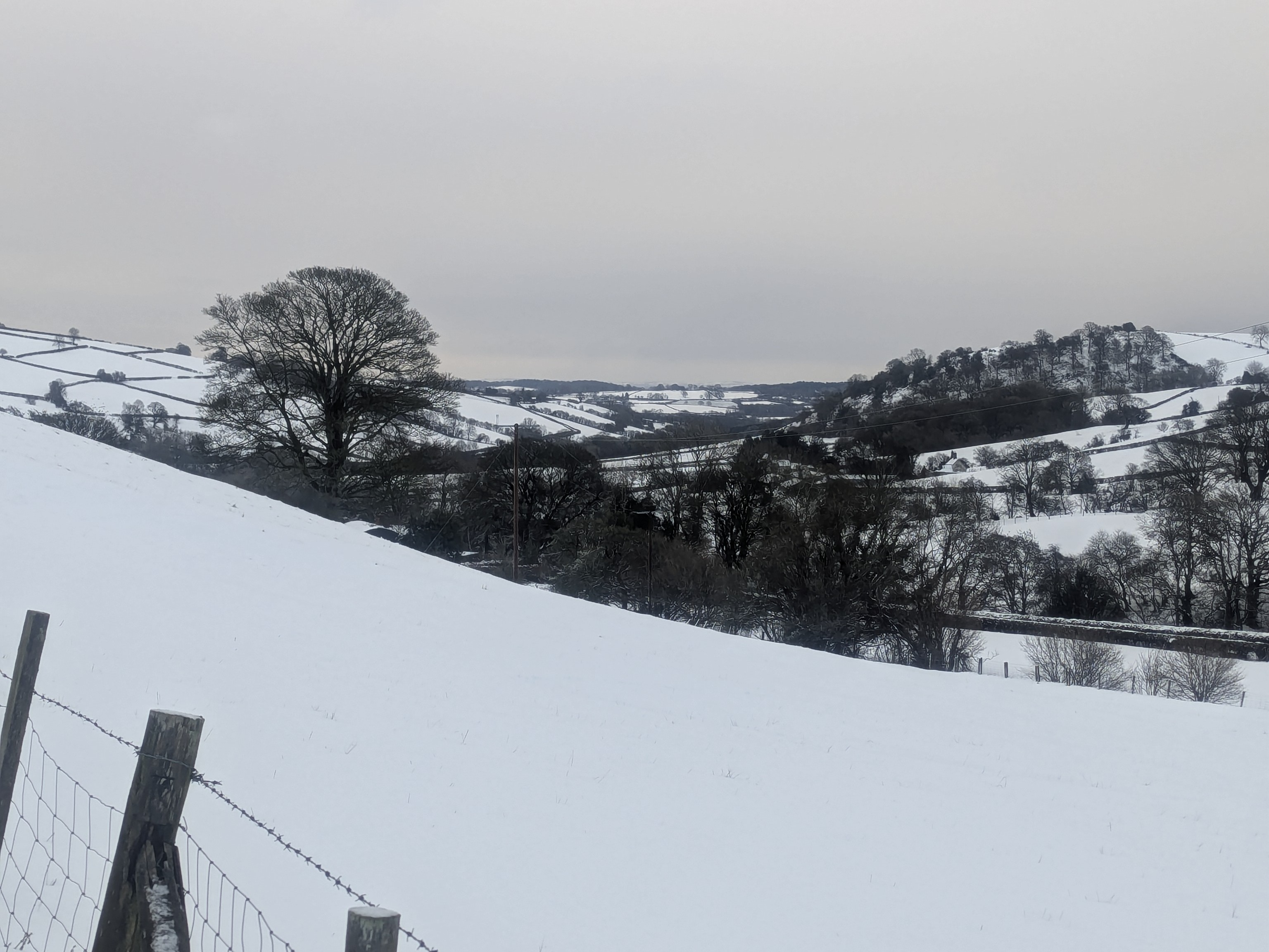
- Snow in Powys during Storm Goretti
  9 January
  - Storm Goretti brings heavy snow, ice and high winds to the UK, with further cold weather forecast. A yellow weather warning for ice is in force for much of the UK for Saturday 10 January, and a yellow warning for northern England and Scotland for Sunday 11 January.
  - Defence Secretary John Healey tells reporters that British bases, personnel or equipment will not be used to support US military action against Greenland, following recent remarks by Donald Trump about the need to acquire the semi-autonomous Danish territory.
- 10 January
  - Non-league football team Macclesfield F.C. defeat Crystal Palace 2–1 in the FA Cup third round, technically the biggest upset in the competition's history, with 177 league places separating both teams.
  - Two people are arrested following protests outside the Iranian embassy in London during which a demonstrator climbs on to a balcony of the building.
  - Weather warnings for snow, rain and wind are in place for Scotland, Northern Ireland and the north of England until Monday 12 January, before milder weather is forecast to end the cold snap.
- 11 January
  - Four people are killed and five others injured in a head-on car crash on Wigan Road, Bolton, Greater Manchester.
  - BBC News reports that the UK government has paid "substantial" compensation to Abu Zubaydah, who was tortured by the CIA and remains imprisoned without trial at Guantanamo Bay after almost 20 years.
  - BBC News reports that the UK government has identified a legal basis by which ships belonging to "shadow fleets" can be boarded and detained if they enter UK territorial waters.
  - The UK government releases a pothole map, showing how various local authorities are faring in fixing them. The map is accompanied by a new traffic light rating system, which evaluates local authorities' response.
- 12 January
  - A major incident is declared as tens of thousands of people across Kent and Sussex remain without water, have low pressure or intermittent supplies, caused by recent cold weather and a subsequent breakout of leaks and bursts.
  - Ofcom launches an investigation into X amid concerns that its Grok AI tool is being used to create sexualised images.
  - Technology Secretary Liz Kendall announces that the UK government will enforce legislation in the Data (Use and Access) Act 2025 (passed in June 2025) making it illegal to create non-consensual intimate images, and make it illegal for companies to supply the tools to create such images.
  - A shortfall in UK defence spending prompts Sir Richard Knighton, the Head of the Armed Forces, to warn that the UK is "not as ready as we need to be for the kind of full-scale conflict we might face".
  - Former Conservative Party Chancellor Nadhim Zahawi defects to Reform UK.
- 13 January
  - Wing Commander Sasha Nash is appointed to lead the Red Arrows, succeeding Wing Commander Adam Collins, and becoming the first woman to take on the role.
  - The UK government drops plans to require people to sign up to their digital ID card scheme in order to prove their eligibility to work in the UK.
  - The UK government outlines its plans for investment in Northern Powerhouse Rail.
- 14 January
  - Following his conviction on 5 September, actor John Alford is sentenced to eight and a half years in prison for sexually assaulting two girls aged 14 and 15.
  - Home Secretary Shabana Mahmood says she has lost confidence in West Midlands Police chief constable Craig Guildford after Israeli football supporters of Maccabi Tel Aviv were banned from a match against Aston Villa after police overstated the threat posed to Israeli fans. Mahmood says that she will reinstate legislative powers allowing chief constables to be dismissed by the Home Secretary.
  - Ofwat is to review the operating licence for South East Water following disruption to water supplies in Sussex and Kent.
  - Fast food outlet TGI Fridays closes 16 of its UK restaurants with the loss of 456 jobs.
- 15 January
  - Office for National Statistics data indicates the UK economy grew by 0.3% in November, faster than had been forecast, largely as a result of good performance in the automotive and service sectors.
  - Shadow Justice Secretary Robert Jenrick is sacked by Conservative leader Kemi Badenoch for "plotting to defect". He is later unveiled as Reform UK's latest Member of Parliament.
  - Downing Street announces it no longer has confidence in West Midlands Police chief constable Craig Guildford.
  - Ofwat launches its investigation into South East Water.
  - The Princess of Wales hosts the England women's national rugby union team at Windsor Castle to celebrate their 2025 Women's Rugby World Cup victory.
- 16 January
  - Hutchison and others v County Durham and Darlington NHS Trust, an employment tribunal case between a group of eight female nurses and the NHS Trust, rules that the NHS trust had harassed and discriminated against eight nurses by requiring them to share a changing room with a transgender women and by not taking the nurses concerns seriously.
  - Following his conviction on 12 December, Robert Rhodes is sentenced to at least 29 years and six months in prison for murdering his wife, after new evidence disclosed by their child led to a second trial.
  - Craig Guildford announces his retirement from the role of chief constable of West Midlands Police.
- 17 January
  - US President Trump announces that the UK, along with other European countries, will be hit with a 10% tariff on "all or any goods" exported to the US from 1 February, amid an ongoing dispute over the annexation of Greenland. Starmer describes the threat as "completely wrong".
  - Justice Secretary David Lammy blocks plans to move Jake Fahri, convicted of the murder of Jimmy Mizen in 2008, to an open prison.
- 18 January
  - The UK government withdraws an amendment to its Hillsborough Bill that would require MI5 and MI6 employees to only give evidence at the discretion of their boss.
  - South East Water apologises as 4,000 homes in Kent experience problems with their water supply.
- 19 January
  - During a speech about the Greenland crisis, Starmer says a trade war is "in no-one's interest" and that the "right approach" is "through calm discussion".
  - The Criminal Cases Review Commission confirms it is holding a review into the conviction of Michael Stone for the 1996 murders of Lin and Megan Russell following an application from his legal team.
  - The Independent Office for Police Conduct launches an investigation into West Midlands Police's decision to ban Maccabi Tel Aviv fans from an away match in Birmingham in November 2025.
  - The UK government is to launch a consultation on a potential social media ban for children under the age of 16.
  - Environment Secretary Emma Reynolds announces an overhaul of the water industry, including unannounced inspections, compulsory water efficiency labels and MOT-style checks on companies.
- 20 January
  - Plans for a controversial new Chinese "mega-embassy" in London are approved by the UK government, amid ongoing debate over the security risks. Downing Street hopes that the 20,000 square metre complex, set to become the largest embassy in Europe if built, will pave the way for trade deals with China.
  - The UK government announces its £15bn Warm Homes Plan, which will make households eligible for grants to install solar panels and other green energy saving technology in order to reduce household bills.
  - The Crown Prosecution Service announces that Lucy Letby will not face any further charges over baby deaths and collapses.
- 21 January
  - Inflation rose from 3.2% in November to 3.4% in December, the ONS reports, driven by higher air fares, tobacco, and food prices.
  - The Parliamentary Commissioner for Standards rules that Reform UK leader Nigel Farage breached MPs' rules 17 times by failing to register financial interests totalling £384,000 within the 28-day limit, but concludes that the breaches were "inadvertent" and do not require sanctions.
  - Chancellor Rachel Reeves says she "would never rule anything out" when asked if the UK would impose retaliatory tariffs on the US.
  - Data from the Driving and Vehicle Standards Agency indicates that instances of driving test cheating in England, Scotland and Wales rose by 50% during 2025, with bluetooth and imposters two common ways of cheating.
- 22 January
  - Foreign Secretary Yvette Cooper says that the UK is holding off joining Donald Trump's Board of Peace amid concerns about Vladimir Putin's involvement.
  - Storm Ingrid: Severe weather warnings are issued for heavy rain in large parts of the UK.
- 23 January – MPs from both sides of the House condemn remarks by US President Trump downplaying the involvement of NATO in the Afghanistan War, during which 457 British service personnel lost their lives.
- 24 January
  - Andy Burnham, the Mayor of Greater Manchester, announces he is seeking permission to represent the Labour Party at the forthcoming Gorton and Denton by-election.
  - Storm Ingrid causes overnight damage in Devon and Cornwall, with the partial collapse of a sea wall protecting railway lines at Dawlish, and damage to Teignmouth Grand Pier.
  - NHS England announces plans for a database of cancer genes that would allow people to check their potential risk against developing certain types of cancer.
- 25 January
  - Andy Burnham is blocked by Labour's National Executive Committee from standing as a candidate in the forthcoming Gorton and Denton by-election.
  - Storm Ingrid: A clean up operation begins following damage caused by the storm in Devon and Cornwall, with a limited service on the Great Western Main Line following the collapse of a sea wall at Dawlish.
  - A group of 86 protesters demonstrating in support of a Palestine Action prisoner on hunger strike are arrested after breaching the grounds of HMP Wormwood Scrubs.
- 26 January
  - UK Energy Secretary Ed Miliband signs the Hamburg Declaration, a joint effort by 10 European nations to establish 100 GW of offshore wind power in the North Sea.
  - Home Secretary Shabana Mahmood announces plans to restructure policing in England and Wales, with the creation of a National Police Service for the most complex crimes, and a reduction in the number of local police forces by two thirds from the current 43.
  - Former Home Secretary Suella Braverman becomes the latest Conservative MP to defect to Reform UK.
  - The Met Office issues a severe weather warning for wind and rain ahead of the arrival of Storm Chandra, the third major storm to make landfall in the UK during January.
  - The World Health Organization removes the UK's measles elimination status, based on 3,600 suspected cases of the illness reported in 2024.
  - Revel Collective, owners of Revolucion de Cuba and Peach Pubs, is to go into administration, with 2,200 jobs at risk.
  - A study by the Centre for Social Justice suggests there are 700,000 UK university graduates out of work and claiming benefits.
- 27 January
  - Storm Chandra hits the UK, bringing heavy rain and strong winds. Weather warnings and flood alerts are in place for many areas, causing travel disruption and closing hundreds of schools.
  - A plan to cap ground rents at £250 a year in England and Wales is announced, along with proposals to ban the sale of new leasehold flats and give homeowners greater control over how their buildings are managed.
  - 50 Labour MPs have signed a letter objecting to the decision to block Greater Manchester Mayor Andy Burnham from standing in a forthcoming parliamentary by-election.
  - Carol Kirkwood announces that she will step down as BBC Weather presenter after 28 years.
  - US Coast Guards abduct the captain and first officer of a Russian-flagged oil tanker and remove them from UK territory. The US force sailed the vessel, the Marinera, into UK waters after seizing it south of Iceland on 7 January.
- 28 January
  - Starmer travels to China for talks with Chinese leaders Xi Jinping, Li Qiang and Zhao Leji. The three-day trip, which includes around 60 British business and cultural leaders, is the first time a UK prime minister has visited the country since 2018.
  - Sarah Mullally is confirmed as the 106th Archbishop of Canterbury in a ceremony at St Paul's Cathedral.
- 29 January
  - The ONS reports that homicides in England and Wales have reached their lowest level in almost 50 years, largely due to a 23% drop in knife murders.
  - Downing Street announces that China has agreed to relax travel restrictions for UK citizens, allowing them to visit the country for up to 30 days without a visa.
  - A Great Ormond Street Hospital review into limb reconstruction surgeon Yaser Jabbar finds that more than 100 children were harmed as a result of operations performed by him.
  - The UK government rejects a compensation claim by the group Women Against State Pension Inequality for those affected by the raising of the state pension age during the 2010s.
  - The UK government announces the continuation of the Warm Home Discount for a further five years, giving around six million low-income households a £150 discount on their annual energy bills.
- 30 January
  - Asylum seeker Deng Majek is sentenced to a minimum term of 29 years in prison for stabbing to death Rhiannon Whyte, a hotel worker in Walsall.
  - Train services on the West Coast Main Line face major disruption following a large fire at a commercial property in Chalk Farm, London.
  - Seven new shops selling Labubu dolls will open in the UK following Starmer's trip to China.
- 31 January
  - The Epstein files:
    - Andrew Mountbatten-Windsor appears in the latest batch of Epstein files released by the US Department of Justice. Photographs appear to show him kneeling on all fours over a female lying on the ground.
    - A second woman alleges that she was sent to the UK by Jeffrey Epstein for a sexual encounter with Mountbatten-Windsor.
    - The files also reveal that Epstein sent £10,000 to Peter Mandelson's partner in 2009.

=== February ===
- 1 February
  - Peter Mandelson resigns his membership of the Labour Party saying he does not want to "cause further embarrassment" after documents released as part of the Epstein files suggest Jeffrey Epstein paid him $75,000 over three separate payments during 2003 and 2004.
  - Train operator West Midlands Trains is taken into public ownership as part of DFT Operators Ltd.
- 2 February
  - The Epstein files:
    - Conservative party leader Kemi Badenoch calls for a "full Cabinet Office investigation" into whether Mandelson and his husband accepted money from Epstein during his time as a minister, while Lib Dem leader Ed Davey says Mandelson should be stripped of his peerage.
    - The SNP and Reform UK report Peter Mandelson to the Metropolitan Police after emails suggest he forwarded internal government information to Jeffrey Epstein when he was business secretary in 2009.
  - Former Labour MP Dan Norris, 66, is arrested for a second time on suspicion of a string of sexual offences between the 2000s and 2020s.
  - During a hearing at the Old Bailey, serial killer Steve Wright pleads guilty to the September 1999 murder of Victoria Hall, as well as the attempted kidnap of another woman.
  - Data released by the Met Office confirms that January 2026 has been the wettest for a number of years for many parts of the UK.
  - Adult website Pornhub will restrict access to its content from the UK.
- 3 February
  - The Epstein files:
    - A police investigation is launched into whether Peter Mandelson committed misconduct in office over allegations he leaked government information to Jeffrey Epstein.
    - Mandelson resigns from the House of Lords following the allegations.
    - Andrew Mountbatten-Windsor moves out of Royal Lodge at Windsor to relocate to the Sandringham estate in Norfolk.
    - Sarah's Trust, a charity founded by Sarah Ferguson, announces its closure "for the foreseeable future" following fresh details of her friendship with Epstein.
  - Two men are killed after a light plane crashes near Manchester.
  - The UK government publishes its ten year cancer strategy for England, which aims to ensure that three quarters of cancer patients are surviving for at least five years by 2035.
- 4 February
  - MPs approve the release of government documents relating to Peter Mandelson's appointment as the British Ambassador to the United States.
  - An 18-year-old man is arrested on suspicion of murder after a student from De Montfort University is stabbed to death in Leicester city centre.
  - Five Palestine Action members are cleared of aggravated burglary after breaching the premises of an Israeli defence company based in Bristol, and are released on bail ahead of a potential retrial for other charges which the jury failed to reach verdicts on.
  - A ban on asylum seekers using taxis to travel to and from medical appointments comes into force.
- 5 February
  - The Bank of England holds interest rates unchanged at 3.75%.
  - 2025 North Sea ship collision: At the Old Bailey, 59-year-old Vladimir Motin, captain of the container ship MV Solong, is sentenced to six years in prison for gross negligence manslaughter that left 38-year-old Mark Angelo Pernia missing presumed dead.
  - During a speech in East Sussex, Starmer apologises to Epstein victims for appointing Peter Mandelson and "believing his lies".
  - 2021 English Channel disaster: An inquiry into the deaths of at least 30 people who drowned while attempting to cross the English Channel in 2021 is concluded. It reports a "significant, systemic failure on the part of government" and highlights three fatal errors – people smugglers overloading the boats, the slow response of a French Naval vessel, and flaws in the Coastguard's search and rescue operations – finding that several of the casualties were preventable. Inquiry chair Sir Ross Cranston points to chronic staff shortages and limited capacity of HM Coastguard in Dover.
  - The King grants Scotland a one-off extra Bank Holiday for Monday 15 June to coincide with Scotland's first FIFA World Cup match since 1998, which takes place the day before.
  - The Met Office confirms that rain has fallen on every day of 2026 so far in South West England and South Wales, with both areas receiving 50% more rainfall than usual.
- 6 February
  - Building society Halifax reports that in January, the average price of a house in the UK exceeded £300,000 for the first time.
  - More than 70 flood warnings remain in place across the UK, following prolonged and record-breaking rainfall.
  - Steven Wright, already serving a whole-life sentence for the Ipswich serial murders, is given a further 40-year prison term for the murder of 17-year-old Victoria Hall in 1999.
  - The Metropolitan Police confirm that two properties linked to Peter Mandelson have been searched following allegations of misconduct in public office.
  - Benjamin Wegg-Prosser, chief executive of Global Counsel, a company co-founded by Peter Mandelson, announces his resignation following revelations about the firm's potential links with Jeffrey Epstein.
- 7 February
  - The Foreign and Commonwealth Office announces a review into a pay-off given to Peter Mandelson after he was dismissed as the UK's ambassador to the United States.
  - Brioche Pasquier issues a recall of some packets of chocolate and hazelnut-filled brioches amid concerns they may contain small pieces of plastic that could pose a choking hazard.
- 8 February
  - Morgan McSweeney resigns as Downing Street Chief of Staff over his role in the appointment of Peter Mandelson as the UK's ambassador to the United States.
  - Documents released as part of the Epstein files suggest Andrew Mountbatten-Windsor shared confidential information with Jeffrey Epstein during his role as trade envoy during 2010 and 2011.
  - The Met Office confirms there are 88 flood warnings and 223 flood alerts in place in England as the rainfall continues.
- 9 February
  - The Prince and Princess of Wales issue their first statement on the Epstein files, saying they are "deeply concerned" by the revelations.
  - Downing Street Director of Communications, Tim Allan, resigns amid fallout from the Epstein files release.
- 10 February – The Met Office issues further yellow warnings for heavy rain for parts of the UK on Wednesday 11 February, while the Environment Agency has 97 flood warnings and 153 flood alerts in place.
- 11 February
  - Lloyds Banking Group announces plans for the closure of a further 95 branches.
  - The manufacturers of plant-based drink Oatly lose a long-running legal dispute with Dairy UK, the body representing UK dairy farmers, over the use of the word "milk" in the product, with the Supreme Court ruling that it cannot use the description.
- 12 February
  - Office for National Statistics data indicates the UK economy grew by 0.1% in the final three months of 2025.
  - Vincent Chan is sentenced to 18 years in prison after admitting to 56 sexual offences, including the abuse of children at a nursery in north-west London. Parents tell the BBC they felt "ignored" after warning childcare bosses about Chan months before his arrest.
  - The General Synod of the Church of England formally abandons proposals for same-sex blessings amid concerns they would create legal and theological issues.
  - The UK government announces that NHS staff in England and Wales will receive a 3.3% pay increase in the next financial year.
  - Merlin Entertainment reverses its plans to exclude people with autism, ADHD and anxiety from the disability queueing policy at its theme parks following criticism from those who would be affected.
- 13 February
  - At a hearing at Preston Crown Court, Walid Saadaoui and Amar Hussein, who plotted an ISIS-style terror attack against the Jewish community in Manchester, are sentenced to life imprisonment with minimum terms of 37 and 26 years respectively.
  - The High Court rules that the Home Office acted unlawfully by proscribing Palestine Action as a terrorist group, but the group remains illegal while the Home Office appeals the decision.
  - 2026 Winter Olympics: Matt Weston secures Team GB's first medal of the games after winning gold in the skeleton.
  - Yellow weather warnings are issued for northern Scotland and north east England as overnight temperatures are forecast to drop, bringing the UK a widespread frost following several weeks of wet weather.
  - Rupert Lowe, a former MP for Reform UK, launches a new political party called Restore Britain.
- 14 February
  - Speaking at the Munich Security Conference, Starmer announces that the UK will deploy a fleet of warships and fighter jets to the Arctic. He adds that the UK needs "deeper links" with the EU.
  - Richard Moth is installed as the leader of the Catholic Church in England and Wales, becoming the 12th Archbishop of Westminster.
  - Bosses at Scottish brewer Brewdog call in financial experts to look for new investment.
  - The UK experiences a largely sunny day following several weeks of rain, but snow and ice are forecast overnight, with more rain on 15 February.
- 15 February
  - 2026 Winter Olympics:
    - Charlotte Bankes and Huw Nightingale win the snowboard cross mixed team event to secure Team GB's second gold medal of the Olympics.
    - Matt Weston and Tabitha Stoecker win gold in the mixed team skeleton.
  - The Met Office issues overnight warnings for snow and ice for northern England and eastern Scotland.
- 16 February
  - The UK government abandons plans to delay local elections in 30 local authorities following legal advice, and ahead of a proposed legal challenge to the delays.
  - Two teenagers who lured a man they suspected of being a paedophile to a beach on the Isle of Sheppey in August 2025, where they killed him with rocks, are convicted of manslaughter. A third teenager who took part in the killing had earlier pleaded guilty to manslaughter.
  - Documents filed with Companies House indicate that six companies linked to Sarah Ferguson are being wound down.
  - Fresh yellow weather warnings are issued for snow and ice for Scotland and northern and eastern England, covering Monday 16 February and Tuesday 17 February.
  - 36 universities are facing a legal case from 170,000 present and former students that they did not receive the full education they paid for during the COVID-19 pandemic.
- 17 February
  - The Office for National Statistics data indicates UK unemployment was at 5.2% in December 2025, its highest figure for five years, and up from the November figure of 5.1%. Unemployment among those aged 16 to 24 was at 16.1%, its highest figure for ten years.
  - The UK Health Security Agency issues a yellow health warning for most of England as temperatures drop, and ahead of the start of a yellow warning for snow and ice that is in force until Wednesday 18 February.
  - UK and Canadian nationals will be able to travel to mainland China for up to 30 days without a visa.
- 18 February
  - UK inflation fell to 3% in January, down from 3.4% in December, largely driven by lower fuel and food prices, as well as airfares.
  - The Met Office and Environment Agency issue a joint statement warning that the wet weather is forecast to continue for another month, and urging homeowners in some parts of the UK to be vigilant of potential floods.
- 19 February
  - 2026 Iran war: Starmer refuses a request from the US for permission to use UK bases for operations against Iran.
  - Andrew Mountbatten-Windsor is arrested on suspicion of misconduct in public office, following a complaint over the alleged sharing of confidential material by the former prince with late sex offender Jeffrey Epstein, with police officers carrying out searches at addresses in Berkshire and Norfolk. He is the first senior royal to be arrested in centuries.
  - Starmer appoints Dame Antonia Romeo as the new Cabinet Secretary and Head of the Civil Service, the first woman to hold the post in the role's 110-year history.

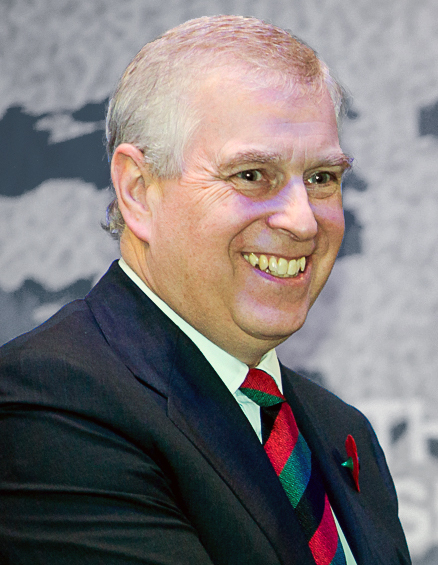
19 February: Andrew Mountbatten-Windsor is arrested.

- 20 February
  - The UK government reports a surplus of £30.4bn in January, the highest monthly figure since records began.
  - The UK government confirms it is considering introducing legislation to remove Andrew Mountbatten-Windsor from the royal line of succession.
  - The UK is to develop air defence weapons alongside France, Germany, Italy and Poland.
  - The Archbishop of Canterbury suspends Bishop of Lincoln the Right Reverend Stephen Conway from ministry while a safeguarding investigation is carried out. Conway is also arrested on suspicion of sexual assault.
  - Global Counsel, the company co-founded by Peter Mandelson, goes into administration.
  - A judge in the British Indian Ocean Territory issues a seven-day injunction temporarily blocking the deportation of four Chagossian men who had travelled to the Chagos Archipelago to protest the government’s proposed transfer of sovereignty to Mauritius.
- 23 February
  - Lord Mandelson is arrested on suspicion of misconduct in public office, following an investigation over allegations he shared market-sensitive government information with Jeffrey Epstein while a government minister.
  - The UK government announces an overhaul of provisions for children with special educational needs and disabilities in England, with education, health and care plans restricted to children with the most complex special educational needs from 2035.
- 24 February
  - Parliament backs a motion proposed by the Liberal Democrats to release documents relating to the appointment of Andrew Mountbatten-Windsor as a trade envoy.
  - Mandelson says he was arrested following "baseless" information passed to the police that he was about to permanently leave the UK for the British Virgin Islands.
- 25 February
  - Ofgem announces a 7% reduction in the energy price cap from 1 April.
  - Deividas Skebas, who is being treated for schizophrenia, is given a life sentence with a minimum term of 25 years for the murder of Lilia Valutyte, a nine-year-old girl he stabbed to death in Boston, Lincolnshire. The Secretary of State will decide whether he serves his sentence in prison or is sent to Rampton Hospital, a high security psychiatric hospital in Nottinghamshire.
  - Sir Lindsay Hoyle confirms he passed on information to the police suggesting Peter Mandelson was a flight risk prior to Mandelson's arrest. The Metropolitan Police subsequently apologises for "inadvertently revealing information" relating to the case.
  - The UK records its highest temperature of the year so far, with 18.7°C provisionally recorded at Kew Gardens.
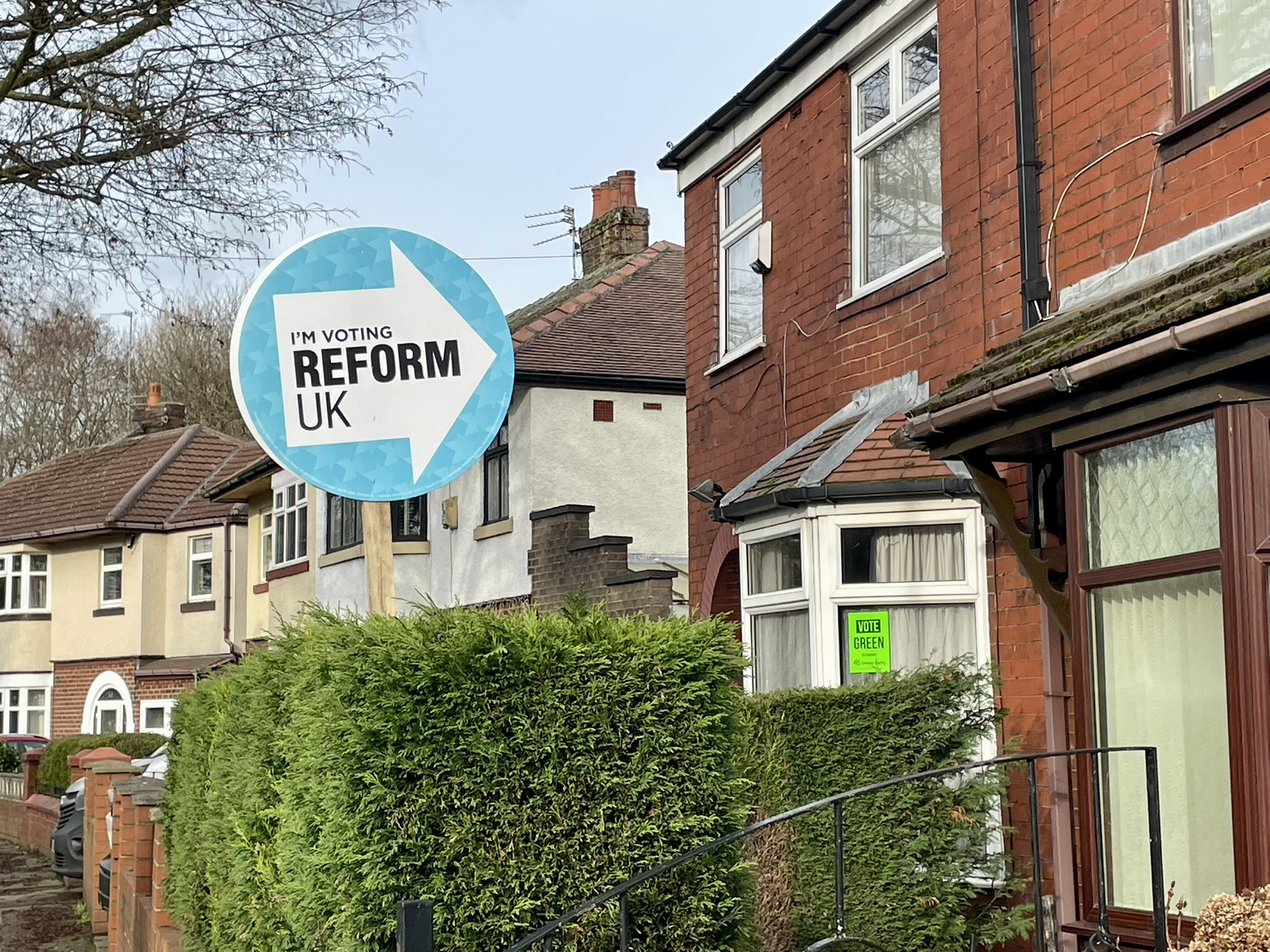
- Green and Reform campaigning material during the Gorton and Denton by-election
  26 February
  - The UK's first geothermal power plant becomes operational in Cornwall, supplying electricity for 10,000 homes. The project will also provide the UK's first domestic supply of lithium.
  - Soham murderer Ian Huntley sustains seriously head injured after being attacked by another inmate in a workshop at HMP Frankland.
  - Office for National Statistics data indicates that 957,000 people aged 16 to 24 were not in employment, education or training in the three months to December 2025.
  - The Ministry of Defence launches an investigation into whether Jeffrey Epstein used RAF bases when he travelled to the UK.
  - The UK is to let Spanish border guards check arrivals into Gibraltar under a deal with the European Union to create an open land border between Spain and Gibraltar.
  - Home Office figures indicate UK a 4% fall in asylum applications to the UK in 2025, but a 13% increase in people arriving via the English Channel.
  - The Green Party wins the Gorton and Denton by-election, their first-ever Westminster by-election win. Hannah Spencer, a 34-year-old plumber, becomes the new MP for the Greater Manchester constituency, with Reform in second place and Labour pushed into third.
- 27 February
  - A member of Palestine Action is arrested after the Statue of Winston Churchill in Parliament Square is vandalised with graffiti.
  - The Court of Appeal dismisses a case brought by a number of private schools against the UK government's decision to remove VAT exemption from fees paid to them.
- 28 February
  - 2026 Iran war:
    - British Airways cancels flights to and from Tel Aviv and Bahrain until 3 March.
    - The Foreign Office issues a warning to British nationals in various Gulf countries to seek shelter and stay indoors.
    - Starmer chairs a COBRA meeting over the US and Israeli air strikes on Iran.
  - Labour MP Josh Simons resigns as Cabinet Office minister, following allegations that his former think tank investigated the background of journalists.
  - The 2026 Brit Awards are held at the Co-op Live arena in Manchester, the first time in the ceremony's history that it has been held outside London.
  - Topshop returns to the high street in 32 John Lewis stores.

=== March ===
- 1 March – 2026 Iran war: Starmer announces that the UK has agreed to a US request to use British military bases for "defensive" strikes on Iranian missile sites.
- 3 March
  - 2026 Iran war:
    - The UK government is to charter a flight to evacuate British nationals from the Middle East "in the coming days."
    - The UK government announces that HMS Dragon will be deployed to the Mediterranean to help increase security around RAF Akrotiri in Cyprus.
    - US President Donald Trump says he is "not happy with the UK" over Starmer's refusal to allow the US to use UK air bases for its airstrikes on Iran, adding that Starmer is "no Winston Churchill".
  - Chancellor Rachel Reeves delivers the spring statement to the House of Commons.
- 4 March
  - The UK government announces it is to stop issuing study visas to people from Afghanistan, Cameroon, Myanmar and Sudan from later in March. Skilled work visas from Afghanistan are also to stop.
  - Three people, including the husband of Labour MP Joani Reid, are arrested on suspicion of spying for China.
  - Debut novelist Claire Lynch wins the gold prize at the Nero Book Awards for A Family Matter, a book inspired by the true stories of lesbian women who lost custody of their children in the 1980s.
- 5 March
  - 2026 Iran war:
    - At a press conference in Downing Street, Starmer tells reporters that the UK will send four fighter jets to Qatar to strengthen the UK's defensive operations there. He also confirms that the UK's first flight to bring citizens home from the region has taken off.
    - The first chartered flight to rescue UK citizens trapped in the Middle East departs from Oman following delays.
    - UK energy suppliers are suspending fixed-price energy deals following a spike in oil prices due to the war.
  - Home Secretary Shabana Mahmood announces a new scheme that could see the families of failed asylum seekers offered up to £40,000 to leave the UK.
  - Joani Reid, the Member of Parliament (MP) for East Kilbride and Strathaven, resigns the Labour Party whip following her husband's arrest.
  - The UK Covid-19 Inquiry hears its final day of evidence.
- 6 March
  - The Met Police announces that four people have been arrested on suspicion of spying on the Jewish community for Iran's intelligence service.
  - UK lenders begin raising mortgage interest rates amid concerns over the economic impact of the Iran war.
  - Sharaz Ali is given a whole life order for murdering Bryonie Gawith and her three young children in a house fire in Bradford in August 2024.
  - German media company Axel Springer agrees to buy Telegraph Media Group in a £575m deal.
  - The UK's first long‑distance robotic-assisted surgery is reported to have been performed on a patient located 1,500 miles (2,400km) away in Gibraltar.
- 7 March
  - Child murderer Ian Huntley dies following an attack by another inmate at HMP Frankland.
  - Iran war:
    - The HMS Prince of Wales, one of the UK's two aircraft carriers, is placed on advanced readiness to sail from Portsmouth.
    - First Minister of Scotland, John Swinney says he is willing to consider banning US military aircraft from using Prestwick Airport if they are taking part in airstrikes on the Middle East.
- 8 March
  - Iran War: Starmer holds a telephone conversation with US President Donald Trump following a week in which Trump criticised Starmer on several occasions for the UK's response to the Iran war.
  - George Russell wins the 2026 Australian Grand Prix.
- 9 March
  - Syrian civil war: The Crown Prosecution Services charges a former Syrian soldier from the Air Force Intelligence Directorate with three counts of murder and three counts of torture as crimes against humanity under the International Criminal Court Act for his attacks on civilians in Damascus in 2011.
  - Iran war:
    - Three more B-52 bomber aircraft arrive at RAF Fairford after Starmer agrees to allow US aircraft to take off from UK air bases for defence purposes.
    - Starmer warns of the war's potential impact on the UK economy.
    - Reeves says she will look at the "unique challenges" the war may present to households reliant on oil fuel heating, as the global oil price briefly exceeds $100/barrel.
  - Mukund Krishna is suspended from his role as CEO of the Police Federation of England and Wales after being arrested as part of a fraud investigation.
- 10 March
  - HMS Dragon departs from the UK for the eastern Mediterranean to join British defence operations in the area.
  - A prison inmate is charged with the murder of Soham killer Ian Huntley.
  - Former England footballer and pundit Eni Aluko is awarded more than £300,000 in damages and legal costs after suing Joey Barton for libel over social media posts.
  - Reform of the House of Lords: Members of the House of Lords vote to pass a bill to remove hereditary peers, which heads to King Charles III for royal assent.
- 11 March
  - Stacey Sharples is jailed for four-and-a-half years after pleading guilty to 10 counts of perverting the course of justice having made false claims, including of rape, against 10 men.
  - The Bank of England announces that British wildlife and British birds will be featured on the new banknotes, with a public consultation inviting suggestions for the specific animals to be depicted.
  - The Home Office approves a request by the Met Police to ban the pro-Palestinian Al Quds Day march through London, due to take place on Sunday 15 March, in order to "prevent serious public disorder". The ban is the first of its kind since 2012.
  - The first tranche of documents relating to the appointment of Lord Mandelson as British ambassador to the U.S. is released.
  - The average interest rate on a two-year fixed mortgage deal in the UK exceeds 5%, while hundreds of mortgage products are removed amid the ongoing economic uncertainty relating to the Iran War.
  - The UK government loses its appeal over a judgement throwing out a terror charge against a member of the Irish language rap trio Kneecap.
  - Tesla Energy Ventures Limited, a subsidiary of Elon Musk's company Tesla, is granted approval to begin supplying electricity to homes and businesses across the UK.
- 12 March
  - Iran war: Defence Secretary John Healey confirms that British forces in Iraq shot down two Iranian drones overnight.
  - A technical glitch means customers of Lloyds Bank, Halifax Bank and Bank of Scotland see other customers' transactions while using their banking apps.
  - Data from the Ministry of Justice indicates the UK asylum appeals backlog was at 80,333 at the end of 2025, almost double that of the previous year.
- 13 March
  - Serenity Francis Johnston, a transgender woman who carried out sex attacks, including rape, against a number of young girls, is sentenced to nine years in prison.
  - Office for National Statistics data indicates the UK economy did not expand or retract during January.
  - Epstein files: An image of Andrew Mountbatten-Windsor and Peter Mandelson meeting with Jeffrey Epstein is found in documents released by the US Department of Justice.
  - Actor John Alford is found dead in prison, two months after being jailed for sexually assaulting two teenage girls. The Prisons and Probation Ombudsman is to begin an investigation.
- 14 March – The public are being invited to choose from a shortlist of six artists who will create a piece of artwork from the wood of the felled Sycamore Gap tree.
- 15 March
  - Liberal Democrats leader Ed Davey calls on the government to start building a "fully independent British nuclear deterrent" to end the UK's reliance on the US.
  - Iran war: Energy Secretary Ed Miliband says that the UK government will intervene if energy costs soar as a result of the war.
  - The Metropolitan Police says it is investigating chants of "death to the IDF" led by Bobby Vylan, of the punk duo Bob Vylan, at an Al Quds Day protest in central London.
  - Kent meningitis outbreak: Two people have died and a further 11 are in hospital following an invasive outbreak of meningitis at the University of Kent.
- 16 March
  - Iran war: Starmer tells a Downing Street press conference that "while taking the necessary action to defend ourselves and our allies, we will not be drawn into the wider war."
  - Nathan Bennett, a nursery worker who sexually assaulted and raped children, is sentenced to 30 years in prison.
  - The UK government announces £45 million in funding for a new supercomputer named 'Sunrise', as part of the AI Growth Zone at the Atomic Energy Authority's Culham Campus in Oxfordshire. It will be used primarily for research into nuclear fusion.
  - The UK government announces £53m of financial help with heating oil costs for low-income households in rural communities.
  - The Office for National Statistics announces changes to the goods it uses to calculate inflation, with items such as alcohol free beer, hummus and pet grooming products added to the list.
  - National Car Parks goes into administration, putting 682 jobs at risk.
- 17 March
  - Chancellor Rachel Reeves tells the BBC that the government will invest £2.5bn in quantum computing and artificial intelligence in a bid to keep the UK technology sector competitive.
  - Kent meningitis outbreak: A "targeted vaccination programme" is announced at the University of Kent, with the outbreak now described as "unprecedented".
  - MI5 apologises to a woman who was coercively controlled and attacked with a machete by one of its agents, and says it will pay her compensation.
  - MSPs vote 69–57 against legalising assisted dying in Scotland.
- 18 March
  - Radical preacher Anjem Choudary loses an attempt to appeal against a life sentence given to him for running a group banned under UK terrorism laws.
- 19 March
  - The King Charles III England Coast Path is officially inaugurated, becoming the world's longest managed coastal walking route at 2,689 miles (4,328 km).
  - Iran war: The price of gas in the UK rises sharply again, amid the ongoing conflict in the Middle East.
  - The Bank of England holds its baseline interest rate unchanged at 3.75%, but warns of a "shock to the economy" from the Iran war that will push up inflation in the near term.
  - Kent meningitis outbreak: The meningitis vaccination scheme is expanded.
  - UK Covid-19 Inquiry: The third of ten reports to be published by the inquiry concludes that patients were harmed as the NHS was on the brink of collapse during the pandemic.
  - The UK agrees a deal with Nigeria to facilitate the return of migrants with no leave to remain in the UK.
  - A 34-year-old Iranian man and a 31-year-old woman are arrested at HM Naval Base Clyde, which houses the UK's nuclear-armed submarines.
- 20 March
  - Kent meningitis outbreak: Health officials in Kent say "it's too early to say" if the outbreak has peaked and whether a national vaccination programme should be recommended. Contact tracing has now been carried out for more than 10,000 people.
  - 2026 Iran war: BBC News reports that Iran's foreign ministry has told the UK government that allowing the US to use British military bases will be considered "participation in aggression". Downing Street says it is "not getting drawn into the wider war".
- 21 March
  - Iran war: Iran launches an unsuccessful missile attack on the UK–US base at Diego Garcia.
  - Kent meningitis outbreak: The UK Health Security Agency confirms that the number of meningitis cases in Kent has increased from 29 to 34.
- 22 March – Iran war: Cabinet minister Steve Reed tells the BBC "there is no assessment to substantiate" a warning by the IDF that Iran has demonstrated its capability and intent to target London with long-range missiles.
- 23 March
  - Four ambulances belonging to a Jewish Community Ambulance service in north London are set on fire in the early hours of the morning. The Metropolitan Police describes the incident as an "antisemitic hate crime" and releases CCTV footage of three suspects.
  - Kent meningitis outbreak: The peak of the outbreak has now passed, according to the UK Health Security Agency. More than 9,300 people have received vaccines and 12,700 have been given preventative antibiotics.
  - Iran war: Starmer warns against the "false comfort" of believing there will be a "quick and early end" to the conflict.
  - The UK government announces a list of potential sites for the creation of several "new towns".
  - Moma Foods pulls some porridge pots and sachets from supermarket shelves and warns people not to eat them after "a mouse contamination event".
  - The UK government says it has asked the company building HS2 to explore running the trains at a lower speed in order to save building time and costs.
  - Changes to prison sentencing in England and Wales come into force, with a significant change being that most offenders who would have received prison terms of a year of less will now more likely be given a suspended sentence.
- 24 March
  - Girlguiding UK, the organisation that oversees girl guiding groups in the UK, says that transgender girls must leave the organisation by September.
  - The Competition and Markets Authority says that written prescription fees from vets will be capped at £21 and practices will have to publish price lists for services.
- 25 March
  - UK inflation in February remained unchanged at 3%, the ONS reports. However, the rate is expected to increase following the onset of the Iran war.
  - Former Google executive Matt Brittin is confirmed as the new Director-General of the BBC, set to replace Tim Davie.
  - Dame Sarah Mullally is installed as the 106th Archbishop of Canterbury during a ceremony at Canterbury Cathedral.
  - Two men are arrested on suspicion of damaging four ambulances belonging to a Jewish community group two days earlier.
  - Kent meningitis outbreak: BBC News reports that the NHS waited two days before raising the alarm about the outbreak.
  - The UK government is to begin trials of a ban on, or restricted use of, social media for 300 teenagers.
  - Apple is rolling out age checks for UK iPhone and iPad users when they update to IOS 26.4.
  - A ban on cryptocurrency-based political donations as well as a new £100,000 limit on foreign donors is announced by Starmer.
- 26 March
  - The OECD forecasts the UK economy will grow by 0.7% during 2026, but warns the Iran war will impact economic growth.
  - Office for National Statistics figures indicate that 13 million people in the UK were living in relative poverty in the year up to March 2025, an increase of half a million on the previous twelve months.
  - York City Council votes to strip Sarah Ferguson of her Freedom of the City of York.
  - Defence Secretary John Healey announces that British forces are now "ready to act" to board and detain ships in Russia's shadow fleet when they enter UK waters.
- 27 March
  - An Afghan asylum seeker is jailed for 16 years for abducting and raping a 12-year-old girl.
  - The price of petrol rises above 150p a litre for the first time in almost two years, according to figures from the RAC. Alongside this, Brent Crude oil is now above $110 a barrel.
  - The UK government issues guidance for screen use for children, recommending that children under the age of five should be limited to one hour of screen time a day, while under-twos should not be watching screens alone.
  - Lloyds Bank reveals that half a million customers were able to see other people's transactions because of a technical glitch.
- 28 March
  - An anti-far-right demonstration organised in central London by the Together Alliance is attended by numbers estimated to be between 50,000 and 500,000.
  - A man is arrested on suspicion of attempted murder after seven people are injured when a car is driven into pedestrians in Derby city centre.
- 30 March
  - Scott Mills is dismissed from BBC Radio 2 following allegations about his personal conduct.
  - The Financial Conduct Authority outlines proposals to redress a situation where several million drivers were mis-sold motor finance agreements, with them receiving compensation averaging around £829 per person.
  - At their annual conference in Brighton, the National Education Union votes to oppose the introduction of a new compulsory reading test for Year 8 pupils in England.
- 31 March
  - Buckingham Palace confirms that King Charles III and Queen Camilla will make a state visit to the United States to meet US President Donald Trump in late April.
  - Nationwide Building Society warns of a potentially softening housing market if the Iran war continues.
  - Starmer gives the British Medical Association 48 hours to abandon its plans for a six-day strike from 7 April, or face losing 1,000 extra NHS training places.
  - Defence Secretary John Healey confirms that extra troops and air defence systems will be deployed to the Middle East to defend Cyprus and the Gulf.
  - It is announced that billionaire hedge fund owner Chris Rokos will donate £190m to the University of Cambridge.

=== April ===
- 1 April
  - Carol Kirkwood presents her final weather forecast after 28 years at the BBC.
  - In his first statement since being dismissed by the BBC, Scott Mills confirms he was investigated by police for a sexual offence.
  - Starmer says the UK will pursue closer economic ties with the European Union in light of the Iran war.
  - The Crown Prosecution Service is reported to be providing "early investigative advice" to police forces as they inquire into Andrew Mountbatten-Windsor and Peter Mandelson's links to Jeffrey Epstein.
  - The minimum wage increases by 50p to £12.71 per hour for over 21s.
  - The UK government withdraws the offer of creating an extra 1,000 doctor teaching places in England after the British Medical Association refused to call off its forthcoming strike.
- 2 April
  - 2026 Iran war: The UK hosts a virtual summit of 30 countries to discuss plans to reopen the vital Strait of Hormuz shipping lane, as oil prices remain above $100 a barrel.
  - The boss of Pride in London is dismissed after being accused of making personal purchases with thousands of pounds worth of vouchers intended for volunteers.
  - The Met Office issues a yellow weather warning for wind and snow for the north of the UK ahead of the arrival of Storm Dave over the Easter weekend.
  - Data from Ofcom indicates that fewer UK adults are posting, commenting on, or sharing material on social media, while AI use has increased, and the majority of people worry about their screentime.
  - Data indicates there were 1,504 heat-related deaths in 2025, lower than expected despite it being the hottest year on record.
- 4 April – The Boat Race 2026: Oxford win the women's boat race for the first time since 2016, while Cambridge win their fourth men's race in a row.
- 5 April
  - In her first Easter sermon as Archbishop of Canterbury, Sarah Mullally calls for an end to "violence and destruction" in the Middle East.
  - Pepsi pulls out as the main sponsor of the Wireless Festival following news that Kanye West is to headline the three-day event.
- 6 April
  - The annual increase in the state pension and a number of benefits comes in with the start of the new financial year. It includes the scrapping of the two-child benefit cap, which will see around 480,000 families with three children or more who claim Universal Credit receive an average of an extra £4,100 a year.
  - The State Pension age begins its transition from 66 to 67 under the Pensions Act 2014.
  - A new law comes into force in England banning the keeping of all primate species as pets in domestic settings.
  - Northern Ireland becomes the first part of the UK to offer parents two weeks paid leave if the woman experiences a miscarriage at any stage during her pregnancy.
  - The UK government says it is reviewing whether Kanye West should be allowed to enter the UK to appear at the Wireless Festival following criticism of previous antisemitic comments made by him, which he has attributed to his bipolar disorder.
- 7 April
  - A six-day strike by resident doctors in England begins at 7am.
  - The 2026 Wireless Festival is cancelled after the UK government blocks Kanye West's entrance into the UK.
  - The price of a first class stamp increases by 10p to £1.80, while a second class stamp increases by 4p to 91p.
- 8 April
  - BBC News reports that the Church of England is to issue an apology over its role in historical forced adoptions.
  - The UK government announces £50m of investment in the UK's defence drone sector.
  - The UK government approves plans for the Springwell Solar Farm to be built between Lincoln and Sleaford, which at 800 MW, will be the UK's largest solar farm once constructed.
  - Channel 4 pulls a celebrity edition of The Great British Bake-Off that included Scott Mills as a contestant from its schedule.
- 9 April – Defence Secretary John Healey says that three Russian submarines conducted a "covert" operation over cables and pipelines in waters north of the UK, and that a warship and aircraft were deployed to discourage the activity. There is reported to be "no evidence" of any damage to UK infrastructure as a result of the operation. Moscow's state news agency say Russia deny Healey's claims.
- 10 April
  - Lee Milne, who was convicted of the culpable homicide of his wife Kimberly after she jumped from a motorway bridge in 2023 following a campaign of domestic abuse, is sentenced to eight years in prison. The case is the first prosecution of its kind in Scotland.
  - The race horse Gold Dancer is euthanised moments after winning the Mildmay Novices' Chase on day two of the Grand National Meeting at Aintree after suffering a broken back.
  - Dilshad Shamo and Ali Khdir, who ran a people smuggling operation from a car wash, are each sentenced to 19 years in prison.
  - Starmer shelves the agreement to hand sovereignty of the Chagos Islands to Mauritius as relations with Donald Trump deteriorate.
- 11 April
  - I Am Maximus, ridden by Paul Townend, wins the 2026 Grand National, becoming the first horse since Red Rum in 1977 to regain the Grand National title.
  - More than 500 people are arrested in central London during a protest against the ban on Palestine Action.
- 13 April
  - A public inquiry into the 2024 Southport stabbings concludes that "catastrophic" failures by the parents of the killer and various agencies meant clear chances to prevent the murders were missed.
  - 2026 Iran war: Starmer says that the UK will not be involved in enforcing the United States' naval blockade of Iran.
  - The UK government approves plans to build a new nuclear power station at Wylfa on the Isle of Anglesey.
- 15 April
  - 2026 Iran war: Speaking to CNBC's Invest in America, Chancellor Rachel Reeves describes the US's decision to end diplomatic relations with Iran and begin a war as a "mistake" and that the best option would be to "de-escalate" the conflict.
  - Following a BBC investigation that discovered rogue firms and advisers are charging thousands of pounds to help migrants pretend they are gay to aid their asylum claims, Home Secretary Shabana Mahmood says that "sham lawyers" who facilitate abuse of the asylum system "will face the full force of the law".
  - The BBC announces plans to cut between 1,500 and 2,000 jobs – almost one in ten staff – as part of plans to save £500m.
  - The owners of the AA and BSM driving schools are ordered to pay refunds to over 80,000 learner drivers after failing to disclose hidden fees in their charges for driving lessons.
- 16 April
  - Office for National Statistics figures indicate the UK economy grew by 0.5% in February, more than had been forecast, while growth for January is revised upward from 0.0% to 0.1%.
  - The Home Office launches an investigation into BBC reports of asylum seekers making false claims in order to stay in the UK.
  - COVID-19 in the United Kingdom: The fourth report to be published by the UK COVID-19 Inquiry describes the vaccination programme as an "extraordinary feat".
  - The UK government says Starmer did not know that Peter Mandelson had failed the vetting for the role of United Kingdom ambassador to the United States until a few days ago.
  - The Governing Body of the Church in Wales votes to approve a bill making the blessing of same-sex marriages permanent.
  - The Court of Appeal quashes the murder conviction of Benjamin Field, a former church warden who was sentenced to life imprisonment with a minimum term of 36 years for the murder of university lecturer Peter Farquhar in Maids Moreton, Buckinghamshire, in 2015. Field will remain in prison, however, while awaiting a retrial.
  - Iran war: The UK government draws up a worst-case scenario where food products such as chicken and pork are in shortage should the conflict continue into the summer.
- 17 April
  - Starmer says it is "staggering" he was not informed that Mandelson had failed to pass initial security vetting checks before being appointed the UK's ambassador to the United States.
  - Homelessness charity Centrepoint announces that it will cut ties with celebrity ambassador Sharon Osbourne after she expressed support for a far-right rally being organised by Tommy Robinson.
- 18 April – A lifejacket worn by a survivor of the sinking of the RMS Titanic sells at auction for £670,000.
- 20 April
  - Addressing Parliament, Starmer tells MPs that information regarding Peter Mandelson having failed vetting for the job of UK ambassador to the United States was deliberately withheld from him by Foreign Office officials.
  - The Home Office blocks US anti-Islam influencer Valentina Gomez from entering the UK to attend a Unite the Kingdom rally following complaints from a number of groups.
  - Education minister Jacqui Smith announces that the UK government is to table an amendment to its Children's Wellbeing and Schools Bill to require schools in England to ban smartphones.
- 21 April
  - Former senior Foreign Office official Sir Olly Robbins appears before a committee of MPs, where he says Downing Street took a "dismissive attitude" to vetting during Mandelson's appointment as the UK's ambassador to the United States.
  - Afghan migrant Tajik Mohammad, who piloted an overcrowded dinghy across the English Channel on 17 January, becomes the first person to be convicted of endangering others during a sea crossing to the UK.
  - UK unemployment unexpectedly fell to 4.9% in the three months to February, Office for National Statistics data indicates, largely as a result of fewer students looking for work while they study. The figure had been forecast to remain at 5.2%.
  - The Family Court rules that prolific sperm donor Robert Albon cannot have his name placed on the birth certificate of one of the children he fathered. Albon had applied to do this after a couple who he donated sperm to named the husband as the father on the child's birth certificate.
- 22 April
  - UK inflation rose to 3.3% in March 2026 as a result of an increase in fuel prices brought about by the Iran war.
  - The Supreme Court rejects a woman's application to undo the adoption of two sisters, who are now adults, after they resumed contact with their birth mother. The application is rejected on the grounds that doing so would go against the long held principle that adoption is "final and permanent".
  - A six-year-old girl with the rare inherited eye condition Leber's Congenital Amaurosis has her sight restored following eye gene therapy.
  - Headteachers and campaigners call for clarity on how best to implement the UK government's smartphone ban for schools in England.
- 23 April
  - The BBC announces that Sara Cox will begin hosting Radio 2's breakfast show, following the departure of Scott Mills the previous month.
  - At a hearing at Newcastle Crown Court, Adam Hall, who infected five men and two boys with the HIV virus after raping them, is sentenced to life imprisonment with a minimum term of 23 years.
  - The UK government confirms that medical information of 500,000 participants in the UK's Biobank programme was offered for sale on a Chinese website.
  - US President Donald Trump says that the state visit of King Charles and Queen Camilla to the United States could help repair relations between the UK and the US.
  - The UK and French governments agree a £662m, three-year deal to tackle migrant crossings that will see 50 riot police deployed to beaches in northern France.
- 24 April
  - A transgender prisoner serving a sentence for murder has been charged with the sexual assault of a fellow inmate at a women's prison.
  - The Terminally Ill Adults (End of Life) Bill fails to become law after running out of parliamentary time.
  - BBC News reports that Jeffrey Epstein housed women who say they were abused in flats in London in the years after the Metropolitan Police decided not to investigate him.
- 26 April
  - Buckingham Palace says the King's state visit to the United States will go ahead as planned following the White House Correspondents' Dinner shooting.
  - Kenyan Sabastian Sawe wins the 2026 London Marathon, setting a new record by completing the race in under two hours after finishing the course in one hour 59 minutes and 30 seconds. The women's race is won by Tigst Assefa of Ethiopia.
- 27 April
  - King Charles and Queen Camilla land in the United States for their four-day state visit.
  - House of Commons Speaker Sir Lindsay Hoyle says he will allow MPs to vote on whether there should be a parliamentary investigation over Starmer's claims about the vetting of Mandelson, which is scheduled to take place the next day.
  - All 154 standalone Claire's stores in the UK and Ireland are closed with immediate effect after the company went into administration twice within a year.
  - Four people appear before Westminster Magistrates to deny criminal damage after apple crumble and custard was thrown at a glass case housing the Crown Jewels in the Tower of London, causing £600 worth of damage.
- 28 April
  - Charles III delivers a historic speech to the United States Congress during his visit to the US.
  - MPs vote 335–223 against holding a parliamentary investigation into whether Starmer misled parliament over the appointment of Peter Mandelson as UK ambassador to the United States.
  - Morgan McSweeney, Starmer's former chief of staff, tells MPs on the Foreign Affairs Select Committee he made "a serious mistake" in recommending Mandelson's appointment to the position of ambassador.
  - The Office for National Statistics forecasts that the number of deaths in the UK will outnumber the number of births each year from 2026 as a result of lower fertility rates.
  - The Ministry of Defence announces that trials of Ajax armoured vehicles will resume "cautiously" after they made soldiers operating them ill.
- 29 April
  - Two Jewish men in their 70s are stabbed in what police are treating as a terrorist incident in Golders Green, north London. A man is arrested in connection with the incident.
  - On the prorogation of Parliament, hereditary peers sit in the House of Lords for the last time.
  - The University of Sussex wins an appeal against a £585,000 fine and ruling it had infringed on freedom of speech.
- 30 April
  - The Bank of England holds its baseline interest rate at 3.75%, amid uncertainty over the Iran war.
  - Fourteen people receive medical treatment, with two hospitalised, after a "chemical smell" at Farringdon station in central London.
  - The UK's terror threat level is raised from "substantial" – meaning an attack is likely – to "severe", meaning an attack is highly likely in the next six months. The Joint Terrorism Analysis Centre says the increase follows yesterday's stabbings in Golders Green, but "is not solely a result of that attack".
  - Street artist Banksy confirms that a statue that has appeared in Waterloo Place, St James's, London, is his work.
  - Ross William Wild, a former member of Spandau Ballet and known professionally as Ross Davidson, is sentenced to 14 years in prison after being convicted of eight offences, including rape and attempted rape.
  - Starmer visits the scene of yesterday's Golders Green attack and is heckled by a group of protesters holding signs and shouting "Keir Starmer, Jew Harmer".

=== May ===
- 1 May
  - Golders Green attack:
    - A man appears in court charged with three counts of attempted murder – two relating to the Golders Green incident and another relating to an incident in south London.
    - Green Party leader Zack Polanski apologises for sharing a social media post that criticised police for their handling of the arrest of the Golders Green suspect.
  - Organisers of the 2026 London Marathon confirm it has raised £87.5m, surpassing the £87.3m raised in 2025.
  - Graham Linehan's conviction for damaging a transgender activist's mobile phone is overturned at appeal.
  - The provisions of the Renters' Rights Act 2025 changing all assured shorthold tenancies to assured periodic tenancies and abolishing section 21 notices come into effect.
- 2 May
  - Four people are taken to hospital with gunshot wounds after a drive-by shooting in Brixton, south London, in the early hours of the morning. One of the four victims, a 25-year-old man, subsequently dies from his injuries, triggering a murder investigation.
  - Starmer tells the BBC that he is concerned about the "cumulative" effect of pro-Palestinian marches on the Jewish community, and that in some cases they may need to be stopped.
  - Iran war: New rules are announced that will allow airlines to cancel flights without losing take-off slots if they are facing fuel shortages over the summer.
- 3 May
  - Two people are killed, and a further three injured, following an explosion at a house in Bristol, which police have described as "suspicious".
  - Police confirm that two woman have died while trying to cross the English Channel in a small boat.
  - Sir Alex Ferguson is taken to hospital as a precautionary measure after falling ill at Old Trafford shortly before a match between Manchester United and Liverpool.
- 4 May
  - Two people are arrested on suspicion of arson after a memorial wall in Golders Green was damaged on 27 April.
  - Buckingham Palace announces that Princess Eugenie and Jack Brooksbank are expecting their third child.
  - 2026 World Snooker Championship: China's Wu Yize defeats Shaun Murphy of England 18-17 in the final. This is the first tournament to be settled in a deciding frame since 2002.
- 5 May
  - Long-term UK borrowing reaches a 28-year high, amid the ongoing Iran war which has affected the UK more than any other G7 nation, and leadership threats to the prime minister in the lead up to local and subnational elections.
  - A report by the Independent Anti-Slavery Commissioner finds that the cost-of-living crisis combined with new technologies have led to record levels of modern slavery in the UK, with a reported 23,000 potential victims, a 22% increase on the previous year.
  - Four members of Palestine Action who broke into the Bristol premises of Israeli defence company Elbit Systems in August 2024 are found guilty of criminal damage.
  - Director of Public Prosecutions Stephen Parkinson announces that hate crime prosecutions will be fast-tracked following a number of antisemitic incidents.
  - The two people who were killed in the Bristol house explosion are named as Jo Shaw and her ex-partner Ryan Kelly. Police say Kelly forced his way into the house with an explosive device, and are treating Shaw's death as homicide.
  - The owners of adult website Pornhub announce that UK Apple users with the most up-to-date version of IOS will be allowed access to the website again.
- 6 May
  - The UK Health Security Agency confirms that two Britons are self-isolating at home after being exposed to the MV Hondius hantavirus outbreak.
  - The final day of campaigning for the UK local elections, and Wales and Scotland parliament elections.
  - Modella Capital announces that 150 of the 480 former WHSmith High Street stores they own will be closed.
  - Catherine, Princess of Wales announces an official overseas trip to Italy.
  - London's Metropolitan Police forms a Community Protection Unit following recent attacks against members of the Jewish community.
  - The UK has recorded its lowest May overnight temperature in five years, after a low of -6.1°C in Altnaharra in the Scottish Highlands, while Shetland experiences heavy snowfall.
- 7 May
  - 2026 United Kingdom local elections.
  - 2026 Scottish Parliament election.
  - 2026 Senedd election in Wales, the first for an enlarged 96-seat parliament and the first by party-list proportional representation.
  - Following a trial at the Old Bailey, a UK immigration officer is among two people to be found guilty of working for Chinese intelligence as part of a "shadow policing operation".
  - A man is arrested on suspicion of a public order offence and possessing an offensive weapon close to the Norfolk home of Andrew Mountbatten-Windsor.
  - A police investigation is launched after a car was driven at three Jewish children in north-west London.
  - Following earlier trials, the UK's first drone deliveries for everyday shopping begin, with online retail giant Amazon offering a limited service in Darlington, County Durham.
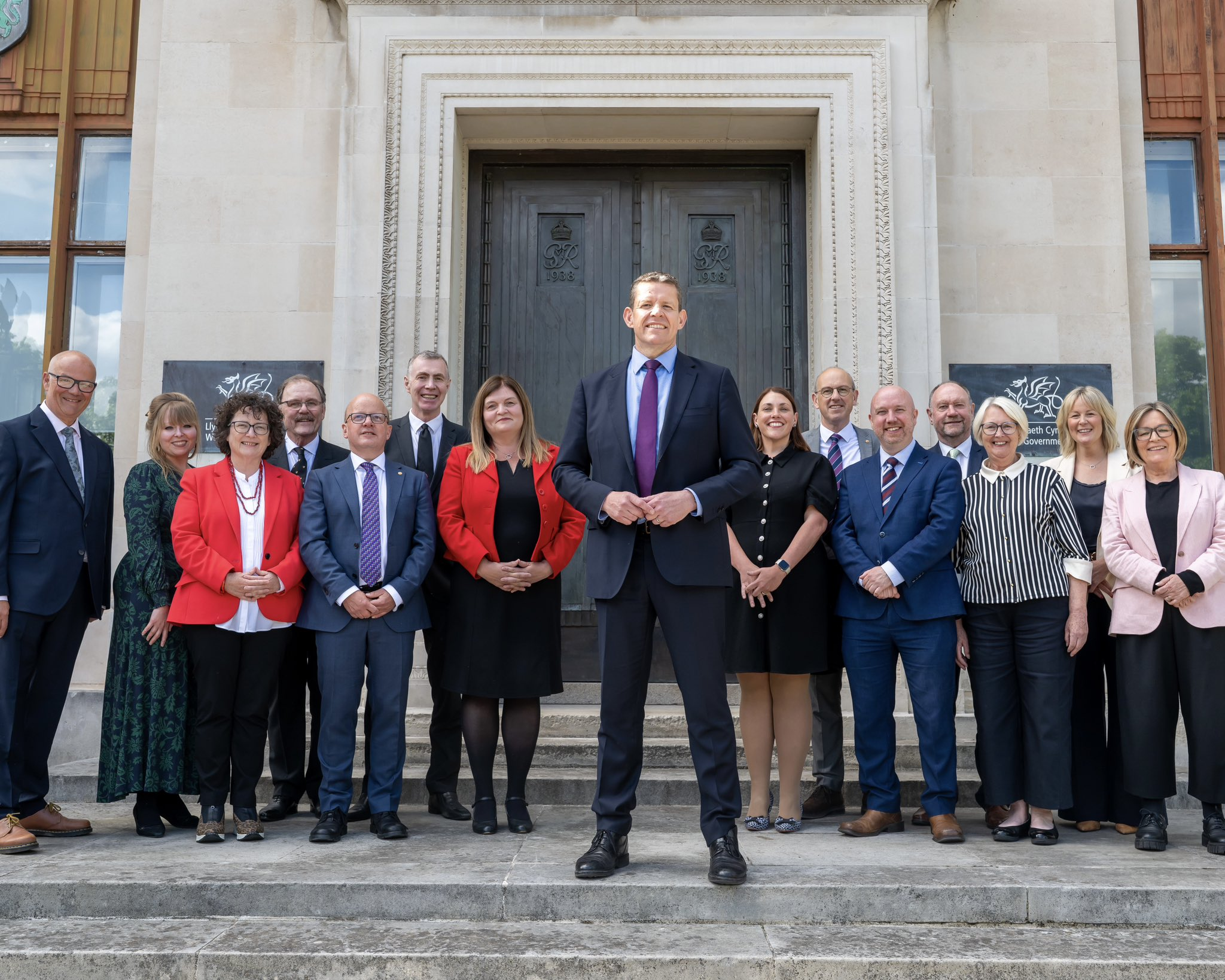
- Rhun ap Iorwerth, the new First Minister of Wales, with his Cabinet
  8 May
  - The results of the previous day's elections are announced:
    - In the 2026 United Kingdom local elections, Reform UK makes major gains in England, gaining almost 1,450 council seats and control of 13 councils, while Labour loses more than 1,400 seats and more than 30 councils.
    - In the 2026 Scottish Parliament election, the Scottish National Party remains the largest party in the Scottish Parliament, winning 58 of the 129 seats. Scottish Labour and Reform UK tie for second place with 17 seats each.
    - In the 2026 Senedd election, Plaid Cymru becomes the largest party in the Senedd, winning 43 of the 96 seats. Reform UK finishes second with 34 seats, while Welsh Labour falls to third place with nine seats, ending its control in Wales for the first time. Eluned Morgan becomes the first ever sitting government leader in the UK to lose their seat.
  - Celebrations are held across the country to mark the 100th birthday of broadcaster and naturalist Sir David Attenborough. A live centenary event takes place at the Royal Albert Hall, featuring the BBC Concert Orchestra, with tributes paid by King Charles, Prince William, and many celebrities. The Natural History Museum announces the naming of a newly discovered species of parasitic wasp, Attenboroughnculus tau, in his honour.
- 9 May
  - In the wake of Labour's heavy election losses, Starmer appoints party veterans Gordon Brown and Harriet Harman as advisers, following meetings in No 10.
  - The Home Office reports that more than 200,000 migrants have crossed the English Channel in small boats since records began in 2018.
- 10 May – Counter Terrorism Policing arrest a man and a woman on suspicion of conspiracy to commit arson following an attack at the former East London Central Synagogue in Whitechapel. Police say the incident is being investigated alongside several apparent attacks on Jewish sites in London since late March.
- 11 May
  - Starmer gives a speech following Labour's losses in the previous week's elections, saying he will fight any leadership challenge and will not resign. Labour MP Catherine West says she is collecting names of Labour MPs calling for Starmer to set a timetable for the election of a new leader by September.
  - The government announces legislation that would give it the power to bring British Steel into public ownership, potentially returning the company to government control for the first time since 1988.
- 12 May
  - 2026 Labour Party leadership crisis: Four junior ministers resign from the government amid growing pressure on Starmer. Miatta Fahnbulleh, Jess Phillips, Alex Davies-Jones and Zubir Ahmed call for Starmer to stand down or set a timetable for his departure. More than 80 Labour MPs publicly call for Starmer to resign, while around 110 sign a statement opposing a leadership challenge. Starmer tells the Cabinet he will not resign and that Labour's formal leadership challenge process has not been triggered.
  - UK government borrowing increases to 5.13% amid uncertainty about Starmer's future, taking it near to levels last seen during the 2008 financial crisis.
  - MV Hondius hantavirus outbreak: Ten people from the British Overseas Territories of St Helena and Ascension Island who were aboard the MV Hondius are to be flown to the UK to complete their periods of isolation.
- 13 May
  - The bodies of three women are recovered from the sea in Brighton, in what police describe as a "tragic incident". The beach at Madeira Drive is closed to the public while inquiries begin to identify the victims and establish the circumstances of their deaths.
  - State Opening of Parliament: Charles III delivers the King's Speech, setting out the Starmer ministry's legislative programme for the next parliamentary session. The programme includes 37 bills covering economic growth, national security, public services, immigration and asylum, digital ID, energy independence, steel nationalisation, leasehold reform, and closer ties with the European Union.
  - The Parliamentary Commissioner for Standards opens an investigation into Reform UK leader Nigel Farage over whether he should have declared a £5m gift from cryptocurrency investor Christopher Harborne before becoming an MP. Farage says the money was an unconditional personal gift and exempt from parliamentary declaration rules.
- 14 May
  - Office for National Statistics data indicates the UK economy grew by 0.3% in March, and by 0.6% in the first three months of 2026.
  - 2026 Labour Party (UK) leadership crisis: Josh Simons, the Labour MP for Makerfield, announces that he will resign his seat to allow Mayor of Greater Manchester Andy Burnham to seek a return to Parliament. Burnham says he will seek permission from Labour's National Executive Committee to stand in the resulting by-election.
  - The Parole Board has rejected an application for parole from rapist John Worboys as he remains a threat to women, meaning he will remain in prison.
  - The government grants development consent to three major offshore wind farms, with a combined capacity of up to 4GW. The projects are Dogger Bank South East and Dogger Bank South West, developed by RWE and Masdar, and North Falls, developed by RWE and SSE Renewables.
- 15 May
  - Former England captain David Beckham becomes the UK's first billionaire sportsman.
  - The UK government bans eleven foreign "far-right agitators" from entering the UK ahead of a Unite the Kingdom rally in central London.
- 17 May – Aaron Rai wins the 2026 PGA Championship, becoming the first English winner since 1919.
- 18 May
  - The International Monetary Fund upgrades the UK growth forecast for 2026 from 0.8% to 1%, but warns it could still be impacted by the Iran war and internal uncertainty.
  - A BBC News investigation finds evidence that people smugglers are directing migrants to pay for English Channel crossings using a number of UK-registered companies.
  - Channel 4 removes all episodes of Married at First Sight from its streaming service and linear channels after two women who took part in the series allege they were raped by their on screen husbands during its filming, while a third alleges she was subjected to an unconsentual sex act. The channel has also removed the series' social media accounts.
  - The Duchy of Cornwall is to sell off 20% of its property over the next decade.
  - Avanti West Coast confirms it will remove 38 daily train services from its timetable for a six-week period from 20 July after being asked to do so by the UK government in order to save money.
- 19 May
  - Transport Secretary Heidi Alexander tells the House of Commons that HS2 will cost the government £102.7bn by the time of its completion, with no trains projected to run on the line until between 2036 and 2039. The top speed will also be reduced to 200mph to save cost.
  - Surrey Police say they are investigating two allegations of historic child abuse following the release of files relating to Jeffrey Epstein.
  - BBC News reports that the UK government is urging supermarkets to cap food prices in return for loosening regulations.
  - The United Kingdom bans uranium imports from Russia with several exceptions.
  - The government announces a new High Street Organised Crime Unit, along with a £30 million, three-year crackdown on shops suspected of being used by organised crime gangs for offences including money laundering, tax evasion and illegal working.
- 20 May
  - The UK loosens Russian oil sanctions as fuel prices rise.
  - James Roscoe leaves the position of deputy ambassador to the United States.
  - The UK agrees a trade deal with six Gulf states worth an estimated £3.7bn.
- 21 May
  - Net migration for the past twelve months has fallen to 171,000, the lowest figure since 2012, and 50% lower than 2024.
  - The Equalities and Human Rights Commission issues guidelines on the use of single-sex spaces, such as changing rooms and toilets, stipulating they must be used on the basis of biological sex.
  - Chancellor Rachel Reeves announces that VAT on attractions such as theme parks and zoos will be cut during the summer months to make them cheaper for families.
- 22 May
  - UK government borrowing reached £24.9bn in April 2026, £4.9bn higher than in April 2025, and its highest level since 2020.
  - The UK experiences the hottest day of the year so far, with a temperature of 28.4°C recorded at Heathrow, west London. Amber health alerts are issued by the UK Health Security Agency for the Midlands, eastern and south-east England, with a heatwave forecast for the Bank holiday weekend.
  - Following the receipt of multiple requests under the Unduly Lenient Sentence scheme, the attorney general is to review the sentences of three teenage boys convicted of carrying out two rapes in Fordingbridge following criticism the sentences were too lenient.
  - The jury in the trial of two men accused of the murder of Ian Watkins is dismissed, and the defendants will face a retrial.
- 23 May
  - A temperature of 30.5°C is recorded in Frittenden, Kent, beating the previous day's high.
  - French authorities suspend border checks at Dover as long queues build up in hot weather.
- 24 May
  - The Met Office announces that eight areas of England have met heatwave conditions as the hot spell of weather continues.
  - It is reported that an RAF plane with Defence Secretary John Healey on board had its signal jammed as it flew near the Russian border.
- 25 May
  - The record for the UK's hottest May day is broken, with a temperature of 34.8°C in West London. Amber heat health alerts are set to remain for large parts of England until Wednesday 27 May, along with unusually high UV levels.
  - The Metropolitan Police announces it will share more body-worn camera footage online "where it can improve transparency and trust in policing".
- 26 May
  - May 2026 United Kingdom heatwave:
    - A tropical night, as well as the UK's warmest night-time temperature for May, has been recorded after a high of 21.3°C at Kenley Airfield, south London.
    - The record for the UK's hottest May day is broken for the second day in a row, with a temperature of 35.1°C in West London.
  - Home Office data suggests 989 migrants crossed the English Channel in 14 boats over the Spring Bank Holiday weekend.
  - Alnour Mohamed Ali pleads guilty to endangering life after the deaths of four migrants who were crossing the Channel on 9 April.
- 27 May
  - Ofgem announces a 13% increase in household energy prices from July, with an annual cost of £221 added to the average energy bill. The increase is largely fuelled by the Iran war.
  - May 2026 United Kingdom heatwave:
    - Nine people, most of them children, are reported to have died in water-related incidents. The Royal Life Saving Society issues a warning following the deaths, saying "warmer weather unfortunately sees an increase in accidental drownings".
    - The Met Office issues a yellow weather warning for severe thunderstorms for south west England and parts of Wales.
  - Resident doctors in England announce a four-day strike from 7am on 15 June, their 16th strike action over a pay dispute.
  - Three people including a child are killed after falling from a high-rise tower block in Elephant and Castle, south London.
- 28 May
  - May 2026 United Kingdom heatwave: Two teenage boys die in separate incidents in Kent and Oxford, bringing the total number of water-related deaths in recent days to 11.
  - Figures reveal that more than a million young people are not in education, employment or training, the highest level in more than 12 years, while a report compiled by former Health Secretary Alan Milburn suggests the number could rise to one in six in five years as opportunities for young people are shrinking.
- 29 May
  - England's Pharmacy First scheme, whereby pharmacists can prescribe medication for seven common ailments, is to be expanded in the autumn to include a further five, although it is unclear what these will be.
  - Figures reveal that Royal Mail delivered 75.7% of its first-class mail on time in the year up to March 2026, short of its 93% target.
  - It is announced that an AI tool to estimate, from photographs taken of them at the border, the age of immigrants posing as children will be deployed from 2027.
- 30 May
  - The UK, US and Australia announce plans to develop underwater drone technology through their Aukus military alliance to better protect undersea cables and improve defence.
  - Court documents have revealed that Buckingham Palace was in receipt of emails in 2020 that would have shown Andrew Mountbatten-Windsor was sharing confidential government information during his role as a trade envoy.
- 31 May – The UK government has hired former chief executive of M&S Marc Bolland to help address youth unemployment.

=== June ===
- 1 June
  - The Permanent Court of Arbitration in The Hague rules that the UK does not have to pay Rwanda £100m damages for the cancellation of the Rwanda asylum plan.
  - May 2026 United Kingdom Heatwave: The Met Office confirms that May was the wamest for England and Wales since records began in 1884. This is the also the third consecutive year that the spring mean temperature record has been broken, making 2024, 2025 and 2026 the three warmest springs on record.
  - May 2026 United Kingdom heatwave: A 13-year-old girl becomes the 15th reported person to have died in water-related incidents during the recent heatwave, after going missing the previous day in the River Wharfe near Burnsall, North Yorkshire.
  - A second raft of documents relating to Peter Mandelson's appointment as United Kingdom Ambassador to the United States is released, and details messages between him and ministers in which the prime minister, Downing Street and Labour MPs were criticised.
  - Vickrum Digwa is sentenced to life imprisonment with a minimum term of 21 years for the murder of Henry Nowak, an 18-year-old University of Southampton student who was fatally stabbed in Southampton in December 2025.
- 2 June – Protesters gather in Southampton amid tensions and scrutiny over why officers arrested and handcuffed Henry Nowak, as he lay dying, with resulting violence as some clash with police. Two people are arrested and eleven police officers injured.
- 3 June
  - Three Royal Navy personnel are killed when a Merlin Mk4 helicopter crashes during a training exercise near Sourton, Devon.
  - Stephen McCullagh is sentenced at Belfast Crown Court to life imprisonment with a minimum term of 31 years for the murder of Natalie McNally in Lurgan, County Armagh, in December 2022.
  - Ofcom criticises the quality of mobile phone signals on trains, noting they are often not strong enough to scroll social media or watch videos.
  - The name of Universal Studios' UK theme park is revealed as Universal United Kingdom Resort, and will be backed with £1.3bn of UK government investment.
  - In the aftermath of the murder of Henry Nowak, Starmer rejects claims of "two-tier policing" and criticises Reform UK leader Nigel Farage's call for "pure, cold rage", after protests in Southampton left 11 police officers injured. Police chiefs also begin a review of ethnicity-related guidance for officers.
- 4 June
  - Starmer accuses Elon Musk of trying to "whip up division" in the UK over the murder of Henry Nowak, after Musk posts about the case on X and offers to fund a private prosecution of Hampshire Constabulary.
  - Bob Harris announces he is stepping down from his presenting duties with BBC Radio 2 after 56 years on air, due to ongoing health issues.
  - A report compiled by Lord Mann recommends NHS staff should be banned from wearing political badges, such as those expressing support for Palestine, as a way of tackling antisemitism.
  - Mirvetuximab soravtansine, a drug used to treat ovarian cancer, becomes available through the NHS.
- 5 June
  - At a hearing at Manchester Crown Court, Paul Quinn is sentenced to 24 years in prison for committing a rape that led to the wrongful conviction of Andrew Malkinson.
  - A team of researchers at the University of Cambridge announces the development of a vaccine with the use of AI that could protect against a large number of viruses, and prevent pandemics.
  - A judge rules that West Lothian Council acted unlawfully by failing to provide single-sex toilet facilities at a newly constructed primary school.
  - Three men plead guilty to violent disorder following protests held in Southampton over the murder of Henry Nowak.
  - Two Romanian nationals are found guilty of stabbing Iran International journalist Pouria Zeraati in Wimbledon on behalf of the Iranian regime in an attempt to "silence" him.
- 7 June – M&S announces plans to launch a training scheme for 1,000 16 to 24-year-olds who are looking to get on the career ladder.
- 8 June
  - The UK government asks tech companies such as Apple and Google to block naked images on smartphones and devices belonging to under 18s.
  - A Sudanese man, granted refugee status in 2023, is arrested on suspicion of attempted murder after a knife attack in north Belfast.
- 9 June – The Independent Football Regulator says it is in contact with West Ham United and will seek urgent information from former joint-chair David Sullivan about his suitability under its owners and directors regime, following allegations of improper conduct reported in a joint investigation by BBC Panorama and The Times. Sullivan denies the allegations.
- 10 June
  - Two men become the first to be given prison sentences for a new crime of endangering lives by piloting small boats containing migrants across the English Channel.
  - Jess Turnbull, a 19-year-old Northumbria Police officer, dies from injuries sustained after being struck by a car while responding to a separate collision on the A189 near Cramlington, Northumberland.
- 11 June
  - John Healey resigns as Secretary of State for Defence over the government's defence spending plans, warning that the proposed settlement would reduce the readiness of the British Armed Forces and could make the country less safe.
  - Dan Jarvis is appointed to replace John Healey as Defence Secretary.
  - Al Carns resigns as Armed Forces Minister.
  - Data from the Ministry of Justice indicates a 70% year-on-year rise in appeals against failed asylum applications, with almost 87,500 lodged at the end of March 2026.
  - A tablet version of the weight loss drug Wegovy is approved for use in the UK.
- 12 June
  - Office for National Statistics data indicates the UK economy contracted by 0.1% in April, largely due to the effect of the Iran war.
  - Starmer tells the BBC it is his "duty" to stay on as prime minister, saying he has made "hard-edged" choices, including getting every department to make cuts in order to pay for defence.
  - A million young people in the UK are to be offered a vaccination against meningitis B.
  - The King and Starmer pay tribute to British artist David Hockney, following his death at the age of 88.
- 12 June to 5 July – England hosts cricket's 2026 Women's T20 World Cup.
- 13 June – Resident doctors in England call off strike action that had been due to begin on 15 June, after the government makes a new pay and staffing offer to the British Medical Association.
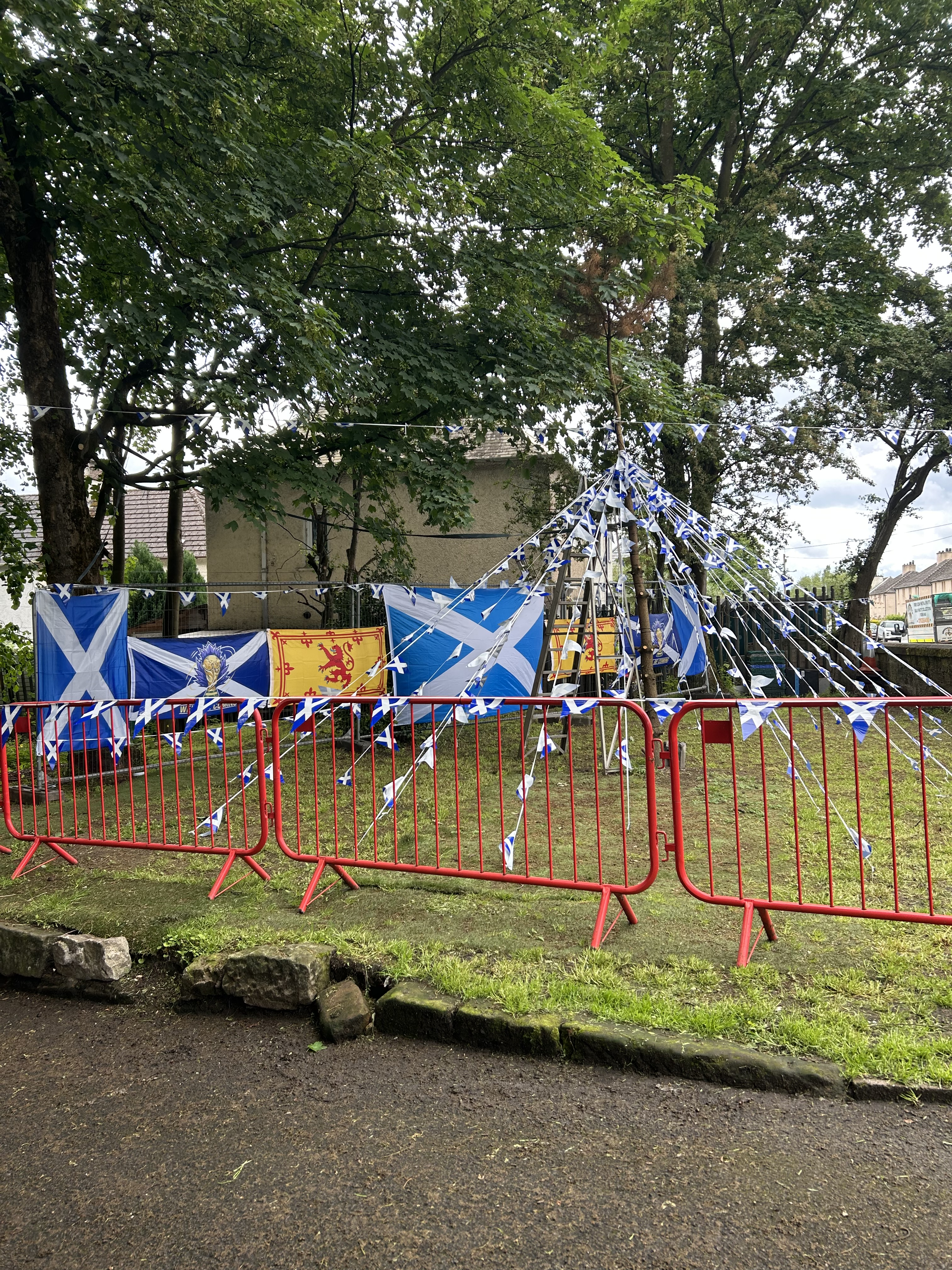
- Scotland flags on display for the World Cup in Carmyle, Glasgow
  14 June
  - UK forces intercept a Russian shadow fleet oil tanker in the English Channel.
  - The UK and Japan announce more than £18 billion in investment and technology agreements, expected to support tens of thousands of jobs, including Japanese investment in UK infrastructure, financial services and offshore wind, while reaffirming their commitment to the Global Combat Air Programme.
  - At the 2026 Barcelona-Catalunya Grand Prix Lewis Hamilton takes a maiden Grand Prix win for Ferrari leading George Russell and Lando Norris producing the first all-British Formula One podium since the 1968 United States Grand Prix. At 41, he becomes the oldest Formula One Grand Prix winner since Jack Brabham at the 1970 South African Grand Prix.
  - At the 2026 FIFA World Cup, Scotland defeat Haiti 1–0 in their opening Group C match, recording their first World Cup finals victory since 1990.
- 15 June
  - The UK government announces plans to ban under-16s from using social media platforms from spring 2027, with further restrictions on gaming and live-streaming platforms.
  - The Court of Appeal rules that the UK government's decision to proscribe Palestine Action as a terrorist organisation was lawful, overturning an earlier High Court ruling.
  - Two men are convicted at the Old Bailey of conspiracy to commit arson following attacks on properties and a car linked to Prime Minister Keir Starmer.
  - The Solicitor-General refers the sentence of Vikram Digwa to the Court of Appeal under the Unduly Lenient Sentences scheme.
- 16 June
  - A Russian warship fires warning shots near a UK-registered yacht in the English Channel.
  - Starmer says that the UK will play a "full part" in reopening the Strait of Hormuz.
  - The UK government objects to a rescue package for Thames Water, raising the prospect that the utility company could be temporarily renationalised to keep it running.
  - It is announced that the Shaftesbury Theatre in the West End of London will be renamed after actress Dame Judi Dench.
  - Kensington Palace announces that Prince George will attend Eton College from September.
- 17 June
  - UK inflation remained at 2.8% in May, Office for National Statistics reveal, as rising fuel costs driven by the Iran war were offset by a fall in food prices.
  - The India–United Kingdom Free Trade Agreement is announced to come into force on 15 July, following talks between Starmer and Narendra Modi at the 51st G7 summit.
  - The BBC announces plans to cut 550 jobs, including roles in its news and content divisions, as part of a wider cost-saving programme intended to save £500 million over three years.
  - The Competition and Markets Authority orders Google to provide greater transparency over its search rankings, following concerns about the company's dominance of the UK search market.
  - The National Cyber Security Centre says that three-quarters of cyberattacks targeting Britain's critical infrastructure can be linked to hostile state actors, including Russia, China and Iran.
  - Data from the Driver and Vehicle Licensing Agency indicates that the average waiting time for a driving test in May was 22 weeks. Secretary of State for Transport Heidi Alexander says the backlog will not be reduced to meet the UK government's target of a few weeks until Autumn 2027.
  - Education Secretary Bridget Phillipson confirms that the UK government will apologise to the families of children who were forcibly adopted in England.
  - 2026 FIFA World Cup: England defeat Croatia 4–2 in their opening Group L match. Harry Kane scores twice, equalling Gary Lineker's England record of 10 goals at the World Cup.

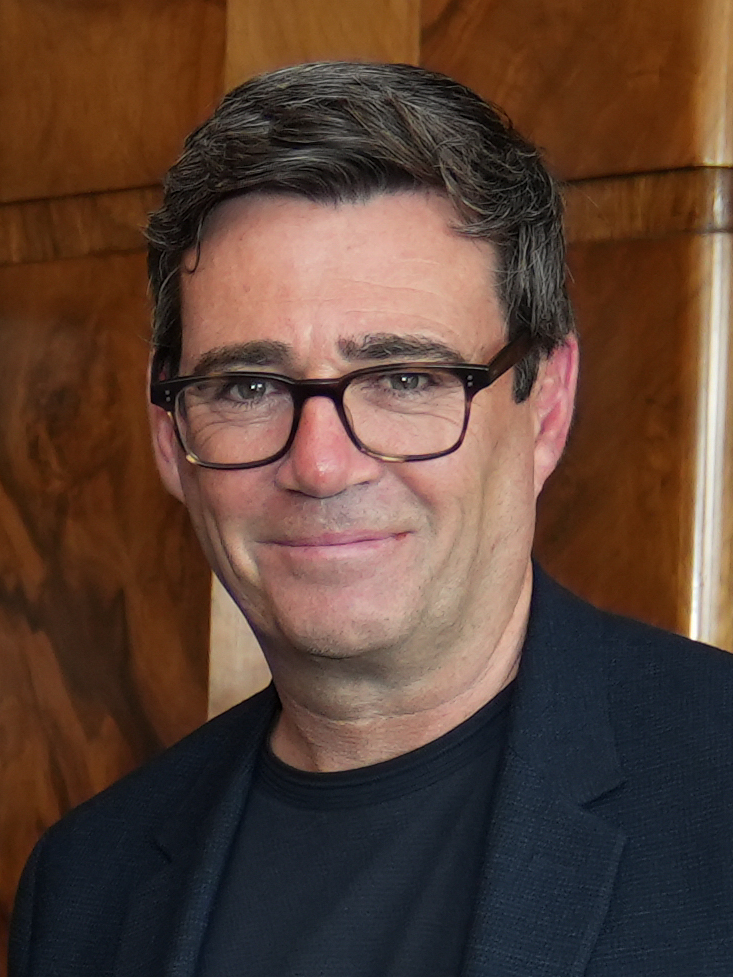
19 June: Andy Burnham wins the 2026 Makerfield by-election.

- 18 June
  - Amber and yellow heat health alerts are issued by the UK Health Security Agency (UKHSA) in anticipation of a heatwave expected over the weekend.
  - The Bank of England holds its baseline interest rate unchanged at 3.75%, and forecasts that inflation for the rest of the year will be lower than previously expected.
  - Teacher Jamie Varley is given a whole life order for the murder and sexual abuse of his adopted 13-month-old baby Preston Davey. His partner John McGowan-Fazakerley is sentenced to 25 years.
  - A three-year-old boy is seriously injured after ending up in a crocodile enclosure at Johnsons of Old Hurst zoo in Old Hurst, Cambridgeshire. A 30-year-old man is arrested on suspicion of attempted murder and later bailed.
  - A study published in The Lancet, led by Queen Mary University of London and funded by Cancer Research UK, estimates that the HPV vaccine has prevented around 200 deaths from cervical cancer in England, and finds that no women aged 20–24 died from the disease between 2020 and 2024, the first such period on record.
  - The UK government publishes its blueprint for a third runway at Heathrow Airport, describing the airport's expansion as "critical to national growth".
  - Office for National Statistics data indicates the number of job vacancies in the UK is at a five-year low as businesses cut back on recruitment.
  - The Foreign Office drops its advice against travel to Dubai, but warns the situation in the area still remains unpredictable.
- 19 June
  - 2026 Makerfield by-election: Andy Burnham of the Labour and Co-operative Party wins the Makerfield by-election, defeating Reform UK candidate Rob Kenyon by 9,231 votes. The result returns Burnham to the House of Commons and clears the way for a possible challenge to Keir Starmer's leadership of the Labour Party.
  - A judge rules that Scottish Government prison guidance allowing some transgender prisoners to be held in jails matching their gender identity rather than their sex is unlawful.
  - Two passenger trains collide south of Bedford, Bedfordshire, killing a driver and injuring 89 other people, 33 of them seriously. A major incident is declared, with disruption to East Midlands Railway and Thameslink services between Bedford and Luton.
  - Five men are injured in a series of suspected anti-Muslim attacks across Edinburgh. A 36-year-old man is later charged in connection with the incidents, with counter-terrorism officers supporting the investigation.
  - The Met Office issues an amber heat alert covering southern and eastern England, as well as parts of Wales, for Monday 22 June and Tuesday 23 June.
- 20 June – The King says he is "greatly saddened" by the previous day's train crash and sends his "thoughts and sympathies" to the family of the train driver and all those affected.
- 21 June
  - The Met Office extends its amber weather warning for extreme heat, which is now expected to last from Monday 22 to Thursday 25, with temperatures potentially reaching 38°C (100°F) in parts of England.
  - The train driver killed in the Bedford train collision is named as 60-year-old Shaun Burton.
  - Internal Bank of England data suggests the impact of Brexit has reduced the UK economy by 6%.
- 22 June
  - Sir Keir Starmer announces his pending resignation as prime minister and Labour Party leader following the return of Andy Burnham to parliament in the 2026 Makerfield by-election, prompting a leadership election.
  - Andy Burnham is sworn in as Makerfield's new MP.
  - Former Democratic Unionist Party leader Jeffrey Donaldson is found guilty at Newry Crown Court of 18 historic child sexual offences, including one count of rape, 13 counts of indecent assault and four counts of gross indecency, against two complainants between 1985 and 2008. Judge Paul Ramsey says Donaldson will receive a lengthy prison sentence at a later date.
  - The Met Office and UK Health Security Agency issue extreme red weather alerts for parts of southern England, the Midlands and Wales covering Wednesday 24 and Thursday 25 June, when temperatures are forecast to reach 40°C.
  - Police confirm that a three-year-old boy injured in a crocodile enclosure is no longer in a critical condition.
- 23 June
  - Peter Murrell, former chief executive of the Scottish National Party, is sentenced to five years and three months in prison after pleading guilty to eight charges of embezzling a total of £459,000 between 2010 and 2023.
  - The day's hottest UK temperature of 34.6°C is recorded at Wisley, Surrey.

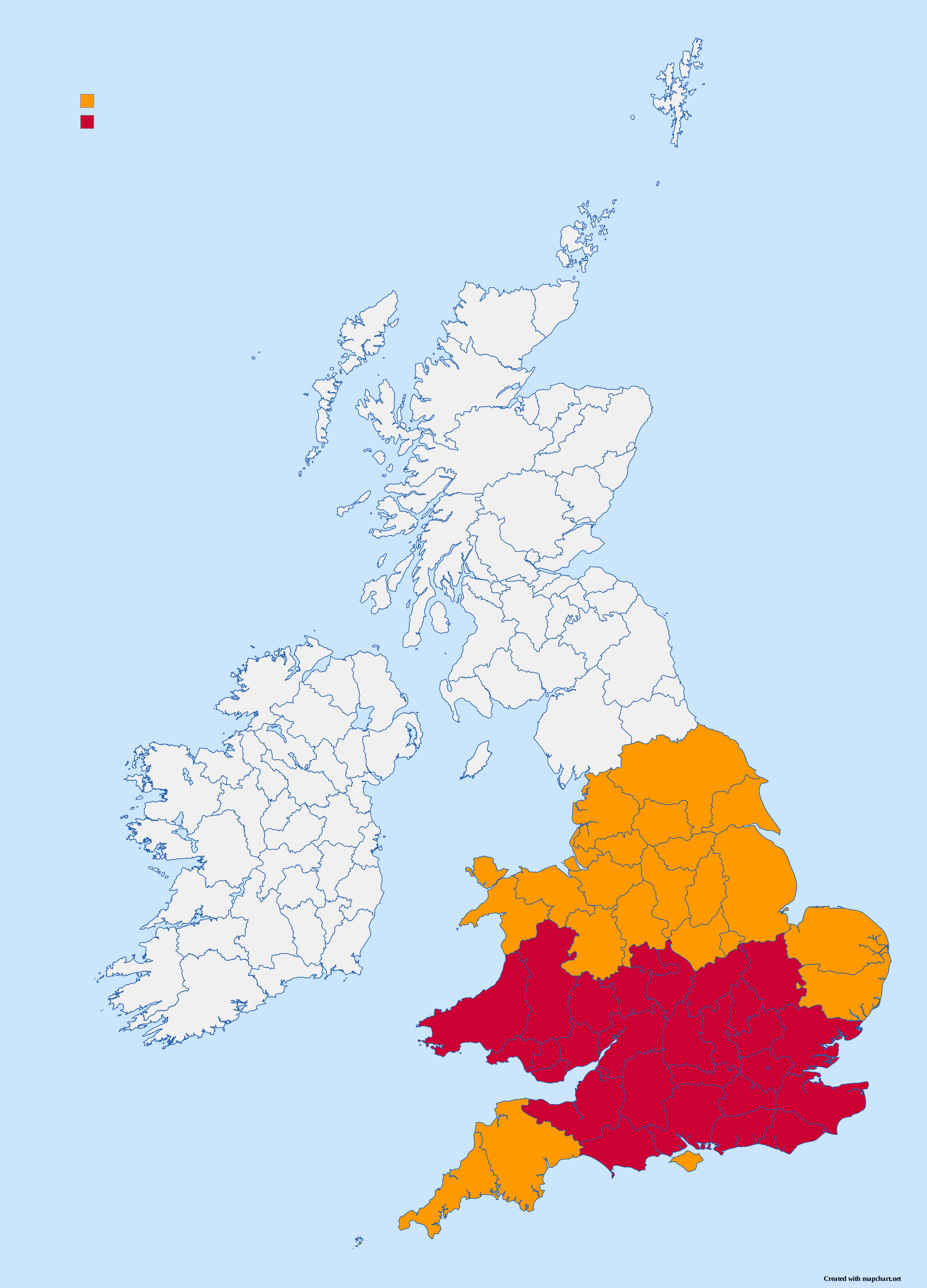
22–27 June: The UK experiences record-high temperatures for June, with amber and red heat alerts covering much of the country.

- 24 June
  - An interim report prepared by the Rail Accident Investigation Branch finds that the train driver killed in the Bedford train crash passed a red signal moments before the collision.
  - An NHS trust pays out £187,000 in damages after an employment tribunal found it harassed seven nurses by requiring them to share a changing room with a transgender woman.
  - The UK provisionally records its hottest June day since records began, with a temperature of 36.1°C in Gosport, Hampshire, breaking the previous record of 35.6°C in 1976. The heatwave, occurring under rare red extreme heat warnings, leads to the closure or partial closure of more than 1,000 schools, widespread rail disruption, hospital appointment cancellations, and the suspension or cancellation of some public events.
  - Former New Zealand Prime Minister Dame Jacinda Ardern and tennis legend Billie Jean King are awarded Honorary Degrees by the University of Oxford.
- 25 June
  - 2026 United Kingdom heatwaves:
    - The June heat record is broken for a second consecutive day, with 36.7°C provisionally recorded in Merryfield, Somerset.
    - South East Water announces a hosepipe ban for around 850,000 customers in Kent "due to high temperatures and record demand for water".
    - Six critical incidents are declared by NHS trusts, due to extreme heat causing problems with IT systems, cancer equipment, lab testing and scanners.
    - Mayor of London Sadiq Khan announces Heat Ready London, the first ever plan to mitigate the impact of rising temperatures in the capital, and suggests that its policy proposals could be applied to other cities around the UK.
  - The number of children getting support for special educational needs and disabilities has increased by 12% between January 2025 and January 2026, UK government figures indicate, with 700,000 children now receiving help.
  - Charles III becomes the first British monarch to reveal how much tax he pays, disclosing that he paid £12.9 million in 2024–25, £11.7 million in 2023–24, and more than £30 million since acceding to the throne. The disclosure is described as a step towards greater transparency, although no full breakdown of the tax calculation or the King's private income is provided.
- 26 June
  - 2026 United Kingdom heatwaves:
    - The June heat record is broken for a third consecutive day, with 38 °C recorded in Lingwood, Norfolk.
    - A red extreme heat warning remains in place for millions of people in London and south-east England, with large swathes of the UK also under heat and thunderstorm warnings.
    - Firefighters from Derbyshire and Greater Manchester continue to battle a major wildfire on Tintwistle Moor that has been burning since Wednesday 24 June.
- 27 June
  - The Home Office announces plans to introduce new "capped safe and legal" routes for refugees to come to the UK from later in the year.
  - 2026 United Kingdom heatwaves:
    - Cooler weather begins to arrive in the UK, but the Met Office extends its amber heat alert for south east England and East Anglia until 9am on Sunday 28 June.
    - Several hundred flights to and from Heathrow and Gatwick airports are delayed due to thunderstorms, with delays expected to continue overnight.
  - British specialist search and rescue teams are sent to Venezuela to assist with the operation following the 2026 Venezuela earthquake.
  - 2026 FIFA World Cup: England defeat Panama 2–0 in their final Group L match, finishing top of the group and setting up a round of 32 tie against DR Congo. Harry Kane scores his 11th World Cup goal, overtaking Gary Lineker as England's all-time leading goalscorer at the tournament.
- 27 June to 1 July – A new music festival, the Blenheim Palace Festival, is held in Oxfordshire.
- 28 June
  - Derbyshire Fire and Rescue Service continues to tackle a wildfire on Tintwistle Moor five days after it broke out.
  - Catherine, Princess of Wales completes the National Three Peaks Challenge to raise funds for the Royal Marsden Cancer Charity.
  - Emma Raducanu withdraws from the 2026 Wimbledon Championships on the eve of the tournament because of a stress fracture in her lower right leg.
- 28 June to 11 July – Wales hosts the 2026 UEFA European Under-19 Championship in football.
- 29 June
  - In his first speech since launching his bid to become Labour Party leader, Andy Burnham says he will redistribute power across the UK and establish a Downing Street team in Manchester dubbed "Number 10 North".
  - An independent inquiry concludes that reforms are needed to fix an education system that "is not serving the interests of white working-class children".
  - Resident doctors in England vote to accept a UK government pay offer, ending their three-year dispute.
- 30 June – Starmer outlines the UK government's long-awaited defence spending strategy, announcing an extra £15bn for defence investment over the next four years and with funds confirmed for £10.3bn of it, to come from making cuts to other departments. This is £1.5bn more than the amount former defence secretary, John Healey, resigned over and £13bn less than the defence chiefs asked for. The budget also includes funds to supply the Red Arrows with new jets.

=== July ===
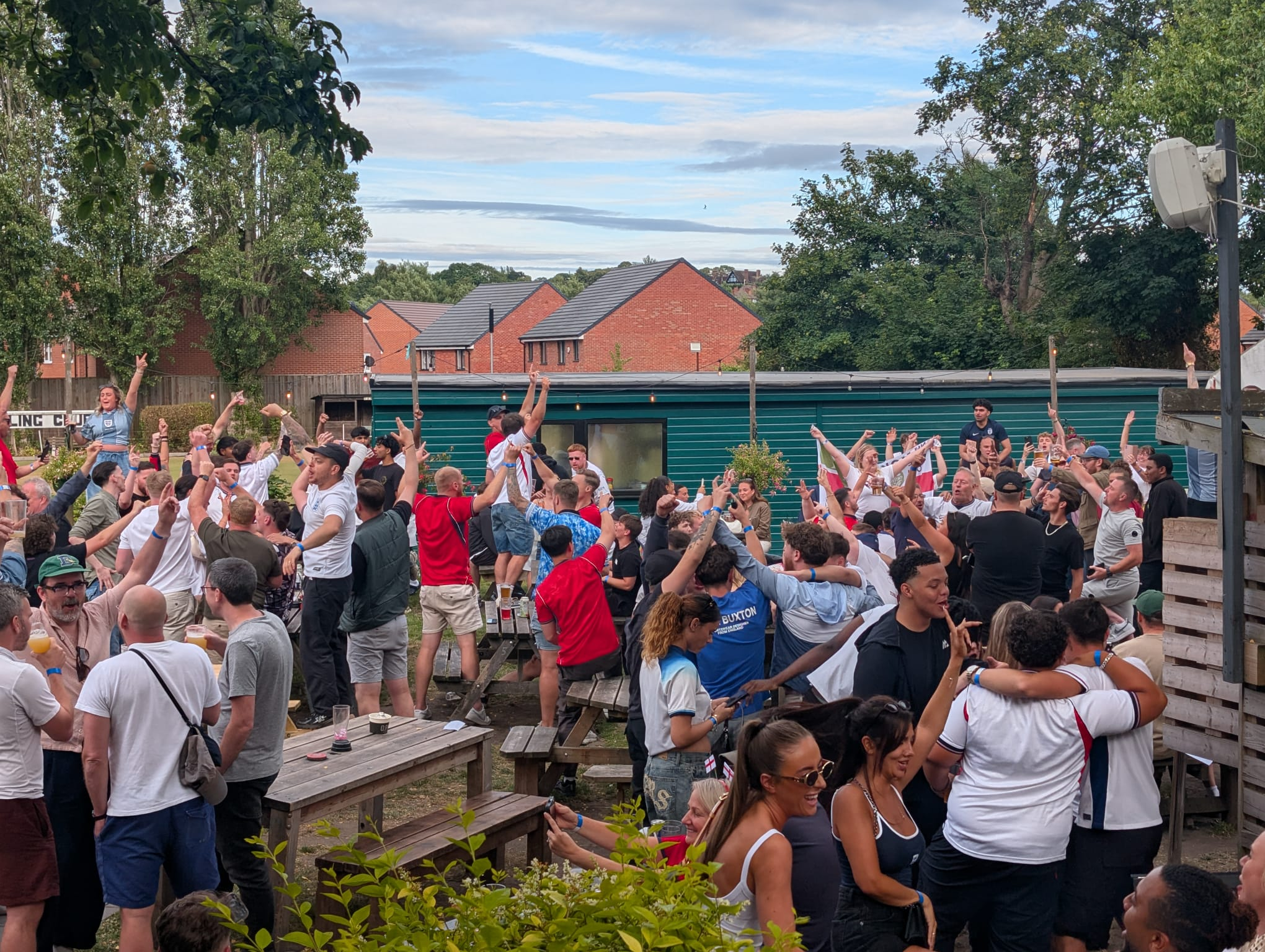
- Celebrations of England winning a match against DR Congo in Stirchley, Birmingham
  1 July
  - 2026 FIFA World Cup: England defeat DR Congo 2–1 in the round of 32, coming from behind through two late Harry Kane goals to reach the round of 16.
  - Lloyds Banking Group announces that it will scrap the Halifax banking brand after 173 years, with Halifax branches to be rebranded as Lloyds Bank from 2027. The group says the change will not result in branch closures or job losses, and that customers will keep their existing sort codes and account numbers.
  - Two police officers involved in the arrest of Henry Nowak on the night he was murdered are to be investigated for gross misconduct.
  - Approval is given for the owners of TGJones, the new name for WHSmith's high street stores, to close 150 stores as part of restructuring plans, and to have significant rent reductions for the remaining stores.
  - Tickets go on sale to view the Bayeux Tapestry, which goes on display at the British Museum in September.
  - The owner of the Duke of York's Theatre in London's West End announces it will be renamed after Sir Tom Stoppard.
- 3 July – Three men are found not guilty of the 2019 murder of journalist Lyra McKee, who was shot while observing rioting in the Creggan area of Derry in Northern Ireland. The New IRA had claimed responsibility for the killing.
- 4 July
  - In expectation of a third summer heatwave, yellow heat health alerts are issued by the UK Health Security Agency for the East Midlands, West Midlands, east of England, London, south-east England and south-west of England. These come into force at 12:00 and are expected to continue until 20:00 on Saturday 11 July.
  - It is announced that Prince Harry will not be accompanied by his wife and children during a forthcoming visit to the United Kingdom.
- 5 July
  - NHS England announces that the NHS app will use artificial intelligence to determine which service is most appropriate for patients.
  - Charles Leclerc wins the 2026 British Grand Prix.
  - Reform UK leader Nigel Farage denies breaching parliamentary rules after The Sunday Times reports that he failed to declare benefits from long-time ally George Cottrell, including staff, security and accommodation, in the 12 months before becoming MP for Clacton. The Liberal Democrats ask the Parliamentary Commissioner for Standards to investigate.
- 6 July
  - 2026 FIFA World Cup: England defeat co-hosts Mexico 3–2 at the Mexico City Stadium in the round of 16, with Jude Bellingham scoring twice and Harry Kane converting a penalty, to reach the quarter-finals despite playing much of the second half with only ten men following Jarell Quansah's red card.
  - 2026 United Kingdom heatwaves: Amber heat-health alerts are issued by the UK Health Security Agency for the Midlands, eastern and southern England from 09:00 BST on 8 July to 21:00 BST on 12 July.
  - Buckingham Palace announces that Prince Harry will not stay at the palace during his visit to the United Kingdom.
  - The Ministry of Defence says that UK fighter jets intercepted a Russian maritime patrol aircraft after it "repeatedly approached" a carrier strike group in the Norwegian Sea.
  - Sky Group announces it will acquire, subject to regulatory approval, ITV plc's media and entertainment division, including its networks and related streaming services, in a £1.6bn deal.
- 7 July
  - Reform UK leader Nigel Farage announces that he will resign as MP for Clacton to trigger a by-election, in which he says he will stand for re-election. Farage describes the contest as a "people versus the establishment" by-election, amid scrutiny over his finances and political donations.
  - The Duke of Sussex and six other plaintiffs lose their High Court privacy case against the publisher of the Daily Mail and Mail on Sunday.
  - A further one million UK homeowners face higher mortgage bills than the Bank of England had previously forecast because of the impact of the Iran war.
  - Author Patrice Lawrence is named the UK's new Children's Laureate.
- 8 July
  - Ofcom fines Virgin Media £28 million for making it unreasonably difficult for customers to cancel their broadband, landline and pay-TV contracts between 2022 and 2024, in what the regulator says is its largest fine under consumer protection rules.
  - Ruth Ellis, the last woman to be executed in the UK, is granted a conditional posthumous pardon. Justice Secretary David Lammy says: "While the pardon does not claim she was innocent... it replaces the death penalty with a sentence of life imprisonment to recognise a profound injustice in this exceptional case."
  - Neo-Nazi Alfie Coleman is jailed for 13 years and six months at the Old Bailey for preparing terrorist acts, after being caught in an MI5 sting while collecting a Makarov pistol and 200 rounds of ammunition in Stratford, east London, in September 2023.
  - Bedfordshire Police name Ndodana Mkhanyisi Tshuma, also known as Mark, as a suspect wanted over the suspected murders of his wife and their two daughters at a house in Great Denham, Bedfordshire. Police say he left the UK via Heathrow Airport on a British passport and is believed to be in Zimbabwe.

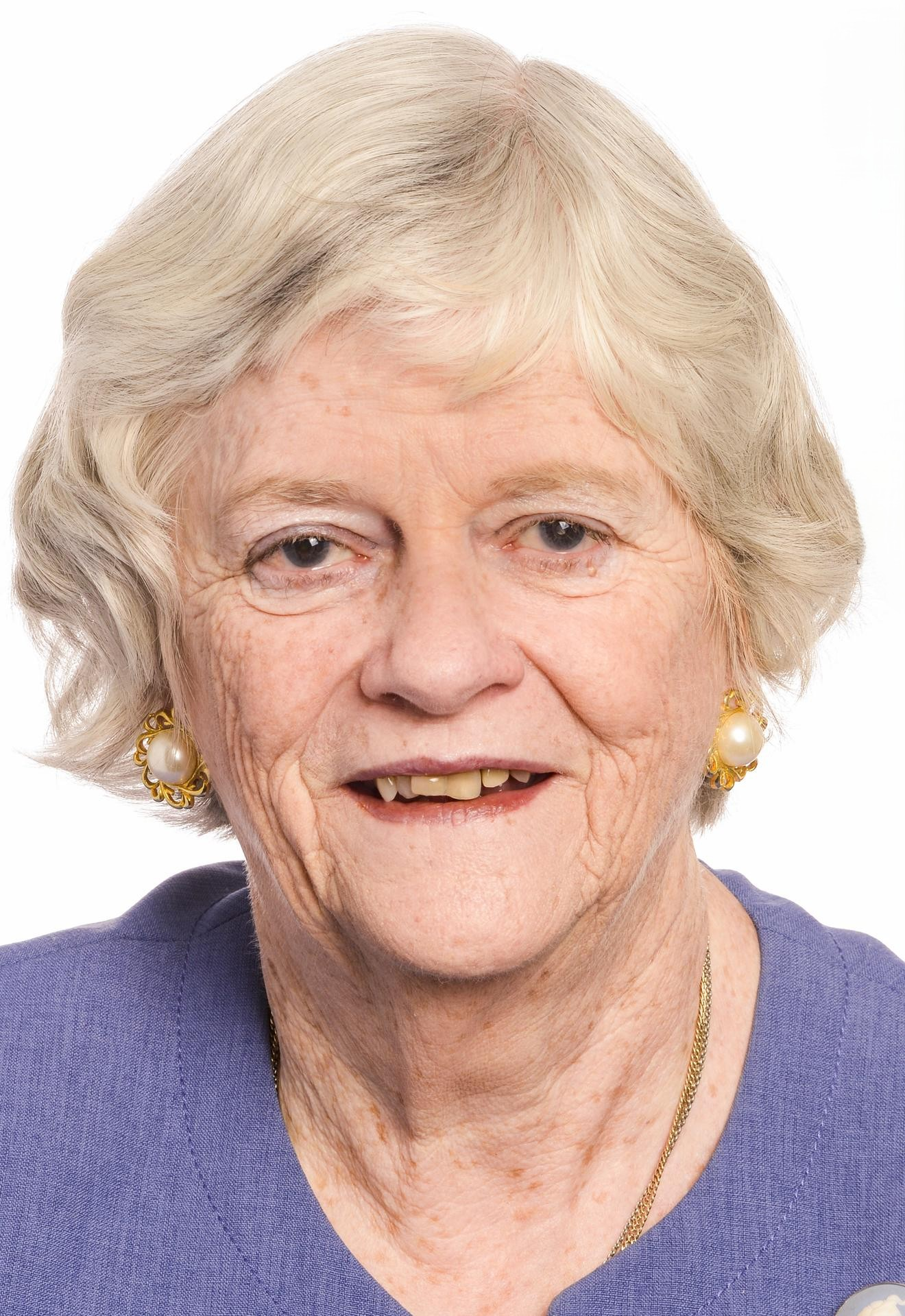
10 July: Police launch a murder investigation into the death of Ann Widdecombe.

- 9 July
  - Tributes are paid to Welsh singer Bonnie Tyler, following her death aged 75 the previous night. Prime Minister Keir Starmer, First Minister of Wales Rhun ap Iorwerth, Catherine Zeta-Jones, Cliff Richard and Bryan Adams are among those paying tribute.
  - Anthony Williams, the suspect in the mass stabbing that occurred on a train in Cambridgeshire, pleads not guilty to all of the charges against him, including the attempted murder of 10 people.
  - 2026 United Kingdom heatwaves: A temperature of 35.1° C is recorded in Wisley, Surrey, which the Met Office reports is the eighth day above 34° C in 2026, a new UK record for the most number of 34° C or higher days in a calendar year.
  - 2026 Labour Party leadership election: Nominations open for the Labour Party leadership election, with Andy Burnham the only declared candidate, and receiving 322 nominations.
  - The UK government publishes a shortlist of 15 nominations for the first UK Town of Culture.
  - The Metropolitan Police apologises for arresting Graham Linehan over posts on X in September 2025.
- 10 July
  - The Bayeux Tapestry arrives at the British Museum in London on loan from France, marking its first return to England since it was created nearly 1,000 years ago.
  - Four Britons are reported to be among the victims killed in the Almería wildfire in Spain.
  - Devon and Cornwall Police launch a murder investigation into the death of former Conservative minister and Reform UK politician Ann Widdecombe, aged 78, who was found with serious injuries at her home near Haytor on Dartmoor the previous day. A 26-year-old male suspect is arrested and later released.
  - Buckingham Palace confirms that the Duke and Duchess of Sussex and their children have visited the King and Queen.
- 11 July – Devon and Cornwall Police say that Ann Widdecombe was attacked around 24 hours before her body was discovered. A 26-year-old man arrested the previous day is released and is no longer part of the investigation, while a 28-year-old man is later arrested in South Yorkshire on suspicion of her murder.
- 12 July
  - 2026 FIFA World Cup: England defeat Norway 2–1 after extra time in the quarter-finals, with Jude Bellingham scoring both goals, to reach the semi-finals for the fourth time.
  - 2026 United Kingdom heatwaves: Emergency services declare a major incident over a large wildfire on Conwy Mountain, on the edge of Snowdonia in north Wales, prompting the evacuation of nearby residents. Firefighters also tackle wildfires elsewhere across England and Wales amid the ongoing heatwave.
  - Devon and Cornwall Police say there is no suggestion of a political motive to the death of Ann Widdecombe.
- 13 July
  - Death of Ann Widdecombe:
    - Counter terrorism police take over the Ann Widdecombe murder investigation.
    - Following a backlash led by Ashfield's Reform MP, Lee Anderson, Labour's safeguarding minister, Natalie Fleet, apologises and withdraws a tweet saying "Nigel Farage and his gang of binmen get the same security as the rest of us. Sick of the faux outrage" which was in response to Farage having said, in relation to Widdecombe's death, that the police and parliamentary authorities were failing to protect MPs.
  - 2026 United Kingdom heatwaves: Data produced by Imperial College London, the Met Office and the London School of Hygiene and Tropical Medicine suggests that more than 2,700 deaths may have occurred as a result of the heatwaves in May and June.
  - Home Secretary Shabana Mahmood announces that Iran's Islamic Revolutionary Guard Corps will be declared a threat to UK national security.
  - Counter-terrorism police have arrested 12 people over a suspected right-wing plot to launch an attack on an Islamic event in Surrey.
- 14 July
  - The fifth report of the UK COVID-19 Inquiry finds that almost £10 billion of the £14.9 billion spent on personal protective equipment during the pandemic was wasted. It criticises the government's "VIP lane" for suppliers with political connections as unfair and inherently biased, although it finds no evidence of cronyism or corruption in the final contracting decisions.
  - The government announces an implementation timetable for its workplace pension reforms, under which schemes will be publicly rated according to their investment performance, charges and quality of service. Larger schemes are to begin publishing assessments in 2028, followed by all workplace schemes in 2029, while poorly performing schemes will be required to improve or close.
  - The House of Commons unanimously approves the Public Office (Accountability) Bill, known as the Hillsborough Law, which would impose a statutory duty of candour on public officials and require them to tell the truth during investigations into public tragedies. The bill proceeds to the House of Lords.
- 15 July
  - Keir Starmer takes his last ever Prime Minister's Questions in the Commons, telling MPs "this is the end of my political journey".
  - A 14-year-old boy is charged over an "extreme right-wing terrorism" plot to target two London mosques.
  - The India–United Kingdom Free Trade Agreement comes into effect.
  - 2026 FIFA World Cup: England lose 2–1 to defending champions Argentina in the semi-finals. England lead through Anthony Gordon before late goals from Enzo Fernández and Lautaro Martínez send Argentina through to the final against Spain.
- 16 July
  - Office for National Statistics data indicates the UK economy grew by 0.1% in May, but was impacted by the Iran war.
  - British Steel is taken into public ownership in order to safeguard jobs and what the UK government describes as "a vital national capability".
  - UK government plans are published to abolish two-tier councils in 14 local authority areas, and replace them with unitary authorities.
  - UK health experts issue new recommendations that all children should be offered the meningitis B vaccine at around the age of 15.
- 17 July
  - British police charge a 39-year-old man on suspicion of spying for Iran.
  - 2026 United Kingdom heatwaves: Parts of southern England record 14 consecutive days above their local heatwave thresholds, while no measurable rain is recorded across central England for 15 days, the region's longest dry spell since June 1996.
  - 2026 Labour Party leadership election: Andy Burnham is formally declared leader of the Labour Party after standing unopposed. In his first speech as leader, he pledges to restore hope and transfer power from Westminster and Whitehall to local communities. He is expected to succeed Keir Starmer as prime minister on 20 July.
  - Kiran Kaur, the mother of Vikram Digwa, the killer of Henry Nowak, is sentenced to three years in prison after removing the knife Digwa used to kill Nowak from the crime scene.
- 18 July
  - The world record for the mile run is broken by British runner Josh Kerr at the London Athletics Meet, with a time of 3:42.66 surpassing the previous record held by Hicham El Guerrouj since 1999.
  - Social media personalities Andrew and Tristan Tate are arrested by the U.S. Marshals Service in Miami following a British request for their extradition. The brothers face charges in the United Kingdom including rape, assault and human trafficking, while Andrew also faces offences relating to indecent images of a child and extreme pornography. Both deny the allegations.
  - 2026 FIFA World Cup: England defeat France 6–4 in the third-place play-off, having led 4–0 at half-time. Bukayo Saka scores a hat-trick as England secure their best World Cup finish since winning the tournament in 1966.
  - Andy Burnham announces he will scrap plans to introduce digital ID cards in the UK in order to tackle cost of living problems when he becomes prime minister.
- 19 July
  - Scottish athlete Josh Kerr breaks the mile world record, recording a time of 3 minutes 42.66 seconds.
  - Thames Water lenders prepare a legal challenge in event of nationalisation.

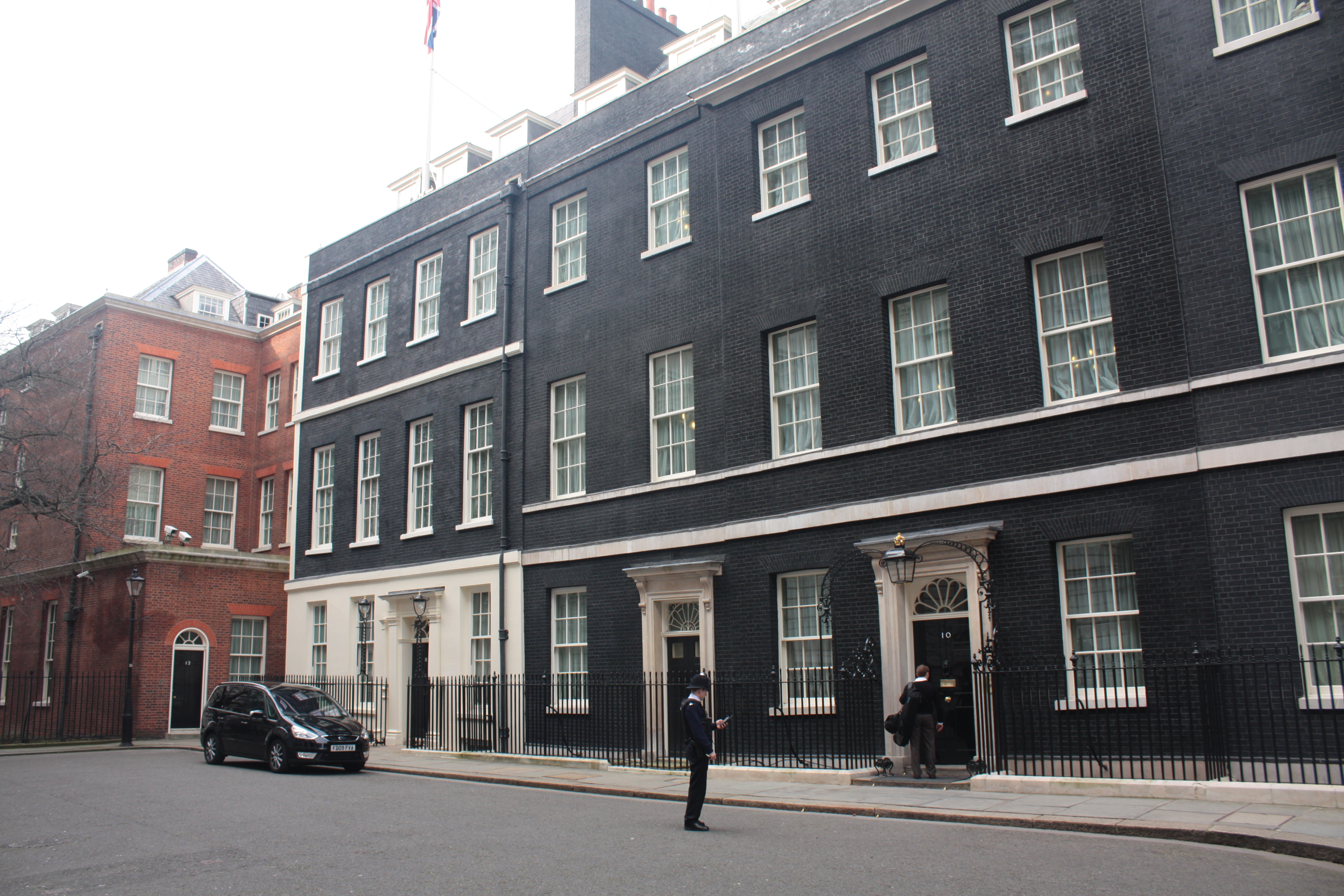
20 July: Andy Burnham becomes prime minister and forms the Burnham ministry.

- 20 July
  - Andy Burnham becomes prime minister, replacing Keir Starmer.
  - The Burnham ministry is formed, with the following senior appointments:
    - John Healey as Chancellor of the Exchequer.
    - Louise Haigh as First Secretary of State, Chancellor of the Duchy of Lancaster and Minister for the Cabinet Office.
    - Ed Miliband as Foreign Secretary.
    - Shabana Mahmood remains as Home Secretary.
    - Wes Streeting as Defence Secretary.
  - A 28-year-old man is charged with Ann Widdecombe's murder.
  - South East Water extends its hosepipe ban, introduced on 3 July, to cover 2.4 million customers in Sussex, Surrey, Hampshire and Berkshire.
- 21 July
  - Andy Burnham chairs his first Cabinet meeting, telling ministers he will lead a "cost of living government".
  - The UK government announces that VAT on domestic electricity bills will be abolished on 1 October.
  - 2026 United Kingdom heatwaves:
    - Thames Water announces a hosepipe ban affecting 10 million customers from Thursday 23 July.
    - The National Drought Group warns that parts of southern, central and eastern England are close to drought conditions.
  - A suspect is remanded in custody at the Old Bailey charged with the murder of Ann Widdecombe. A provisional trial date is set for 8 June 2027.
  - Andy Burnham authorises the US to utilise British military bases for defensive strikes on Iran during the 2026 Iran war, following Keir Starmer's stance.
- 22 July
  - Burnham promises a review of legislation within the Sentencing Act that will permit the early release of prisoners from September to free up prison places.
  - Burnham announces that single bus fares on participating services in England outside London will be capped at £2 from 1 January until 31 December 2027, replacing the existing £3 cap.
  - Kensington Palace releases a new video of Prince George to celebrate his 13th birthday.
  - Irish police intercept a car carrying what Garda Commissioner Justin Kelly describes as an "extremely significant" explosive device near Carrickmacross, County Monaghan. The bomb was reportedly being transported across the border for an attack in Northern Ireland linked to dissident republican activity. A woman in her 20s and a man in his 40s are arrested.
- 23 July
  - Brent crude oil exceeds US$100 per barrel for the first time since 26 May, following attacks on Saudi oil tankers and further disruption to shipping in the Red Sea and Strait of Hormuz.
  - Burnham pauses changes to the early release of prisoners that were due to take effect in September, saying that no prisoners will be released under the policy until an urgent review has been completed.
  - Burnham announces a 20% reduction in business rates for pubs, social clubs and live music venues from April 2027.
  - 2026 United Kingdom heatwaves: Natural Resources Wales declares parts of north Wales and the Upper Severn to be in drought, while all remaining Welsh catchments are placed under prolonged dry weather status. July is on course to become the driest recorded in Wales for almost 190 years, following successive heatwaves, widespread wildfires and exceptionally low river levels.
  - Former Coronation Street actor Qasim Akhtar is awarded damages at the High Court of Justice in a libel case against The Sun.
  - Former Democratic Unionist Party leader Jeffrey Donaldson is stripped of his knighthood following his conviction for 18 historical sexual offences, including rape.
  - Prime Minister Andy Burnham meets the respective First Ministers of Scotland and Wales, John Swinney and Rhun ap Iorwerth, in Glasgow ahead of the 2026 Commonwealth Games opening ceremony.
  - The opening ceremony of the 2026 Commonwealth Games takes place in Glasgow.
- 23 to 26 July – The WOMAD Festival returns after a year's hiatus with the festival now based at Neston Park Estate near Corsham, Wiltshire.
- 23 July to 2 August – The 2026 Commonwealth Games are being held in Glasgow.
- 24 July
  - A major incident is declared following a large explosion and fire at an industrial site between East Hanningfield and Rettendon in Essex. More than 100 firefighters are in attendance, as local residents are advised to keep doors and windows shut.
  - Southport killer Axel Rudakubana is transferred from prison to Broadmoor Hospital, a high-security psychiatric facility.
  - Andy Burnham's Number 10 North is launched in Manchester.
  - The United States imposes a 10% tariff on imports from the United Kingdom, citing alleged forced labour in British supply chains.
- 25 July
  - BBC News reports that the Metropolitan Police is investigating four donations totalling £1 million made to Reform UK before the 2024 United Kingdom general election, including two payments from major party donor Fiona Cottrell and two from Britain Means Business, a company owned and controlled by Reform deputy leader Richard Tice. Cottrell had transferred £1 million to the company shortly before it donated £500,000 to the party.
  - 2026 Essex explosion: It is reported that 20 firefighters were injured tackling the fire, while three fire engines and two fire service cars were destroyed.
- 26 July – A Sudanese teenager, aged 19, is charged with piloting a large dinghy that carried 165 migrants across the English Channel.
- 27 July
  - The Supreme Court rejects Bahrain's attempt to use state immunity to block a spyware lawsuit brought by two dissidents.
  - BBC News reports that the Jodrell Bank Observatory, which has housed the UK's largest telescope for nearly 70 years, is expected to close in 2028 due to a lack of funding.
  - 2026 United Kingdom heatwaves: Amber heat health alerts are issued for the East Midlands, East of England, London and the South East amid forecasts of the summer's fourth heatwave.
- 28 July
  - The UK government announces plans to get young people into employment that will see some parents on benefits offered bursaries of up to £4,500 a year to encourage their children to start apprenticeships.
  - Burnham sets out education reforms that will enable secondary school students to study technical subjects such as manufacturing and AI in addition to core academic subjects.
  - A French Navy patrol boat is seen to apparently fire a round of gunshots "without warning" in the English Channel during a BBC interview with Shadow Home Secretary Chris Philp.
- 29 July
  - 2026 United Kingdom heatwaves:
    - More than half of England is now reported to be in drought. The Environment Agency describes the summer as "exceptionally hot and dry" and says that July has seen just 7% of expected rainfall, with only 1% across southern England. Some regions have now been without rain for 50 days.
    - A wildfire breaks out in Dunwich Heath, Suffolk. By the following day, it has spread to cover 150 hectares, and is being attended by 100 firefighters.
  - A Norwegian man is convicted of conspiracy to commit murder in Britain after being recruited by a Swedish organised crime gang allegedly used by Iran's government.
  - The BBC announces the cancellation of the programmes Blankety Blank, Celebrity Mastermind and Live at the Apollo.
  - Burnham delivers a major speech on social care reform, promising to fix adult social care in England.
  - James Desborough is sentenced to two whole-life prison terms for the murder of two men at a homeless hostel in Cornwall, after he was convicted of the killings the previous day.
- 30 July
  - The Bank of England holds interest rates at 3.75% for a fifth consecutive month, but warns they may have to rise later in the year.
  - 2026 United Kingdom heatwaves: A drought is declared across the whole of Wales, with the country on course to experience its driest July for 190 years.
  - The Supreme Court confirms it will review the proscription of Palestine Action as a terrorist organisation.
- 31 July
  - Bev Craig is elected as Mayor of Greater Manchester, retaining the seat for Labour.
  - Former funeral director Robert Bush is sentenced at Hull Crown Court to 20 years' imprisonment after admitting 67 offences committed over 12 years, including preventing the lawful and decent burial of 30 bodies, giving bereaved families incorrect ashes, fraud and theft from charities. The case involved one of the biggest and most complex investigations in the history of Humberside Police.
  - Southport killer Axel Rudakubana is charged with attacks against three prison officers and possession of a knife.
  - Sainsbury's agrees a deal with Swift Partners to sell Argos for £120m. Argos will continue to operate in Sainsbury's stores.
  - The High Court upholds a planning decision to allow the construction of a Chinese mega-embassy in London.
  - BP announces it is putting its North Sea oil business up for sale.
  - The High Court rejects a legal challenge against the Pathways trial, a high-profile clinical trial of drugs that can delay puberty in children questioning their gender, meaning the trial can go ahead.
  - 2026 United Kingdom heatwaves: The Met Office confirms that England and Wales are on course for their driest July since records began.
  - Sam Fender and Olivia Dean's "Rein Me In" becomes the longest running number-one on the UK singles chart with 19 non-consecutive weeks, breaking the previous record held by Frankie Laine’s "I Believe" in 1953.

=== August ===
- 2 August – 2026 United Kingdom heatwaves: The National Farmers' Union warns of potential shortages of some foods if the drought continues.
- 3 August
  - The Football Association of Wales withdraws its support for Gianni Infantino's re-election as president of FIFA, while the English Football Association prepares to follow, amid controversy surrounding the abandoned FIFA Forward Enterprise proposal.
  - Bev Craig assumes office as Mayor of Greater Manchester, succeeding Andy Burnham.
  - Richard Tice, the deputy leader of Reform UK, is investigated by a parliamentary watchdog over a possible failure to declare an interest. Tice says the investigation is related to a debate on UK democracy and Israeli influence, following a complaint from an "anti-Israel" lobby group.
- 4 August – Updated Equality and Human Rights Commission guidance stating that single-sex spaces open to the public should be organised based on biological sex, and that trans people should use either gender-neutral facilities or the ones that match their biological sex, comes into force.
- 5 August
  - A 47-year-old woman is arrested after four men are stabbed in Covent Garden, central London. All victims are treated at the scene by an air ambulance team and then taken to a major trauma centre.
  - University of Cambridge professor Jason Arday resigns from his post following a plagiarism controversy.
  - The Independent Office for Police Conduct rules that the officer who shot Chris Kaba will not face disciplinary proceedings.
- 6 August
  - A power failure at a railway signalling centre in Greater Manchester causes delays and cancellations to train services throughout northern England.
  - A woman is remanded in custody over the previous day's stabbings at Covent Garden.
- 7 August
  - Simon Levy, a serial sex offender who was being monitored by the Metropolitan Police, is convicted of the murders of Carmenza Valencia-Trujillo and Sheryl Wilkins, as well as the rape of a third woman.
  - The University of Cambridge announces a review of its process for hiring senior academics following the resignation of Jason Arday in the midst of a plagiarism row.
  - Counter-terrorism police investigating the killing of Ann Widdecombe reopen inquiries into an attempted burglary that occurred at Nigel Farage’s London address in April 2025.
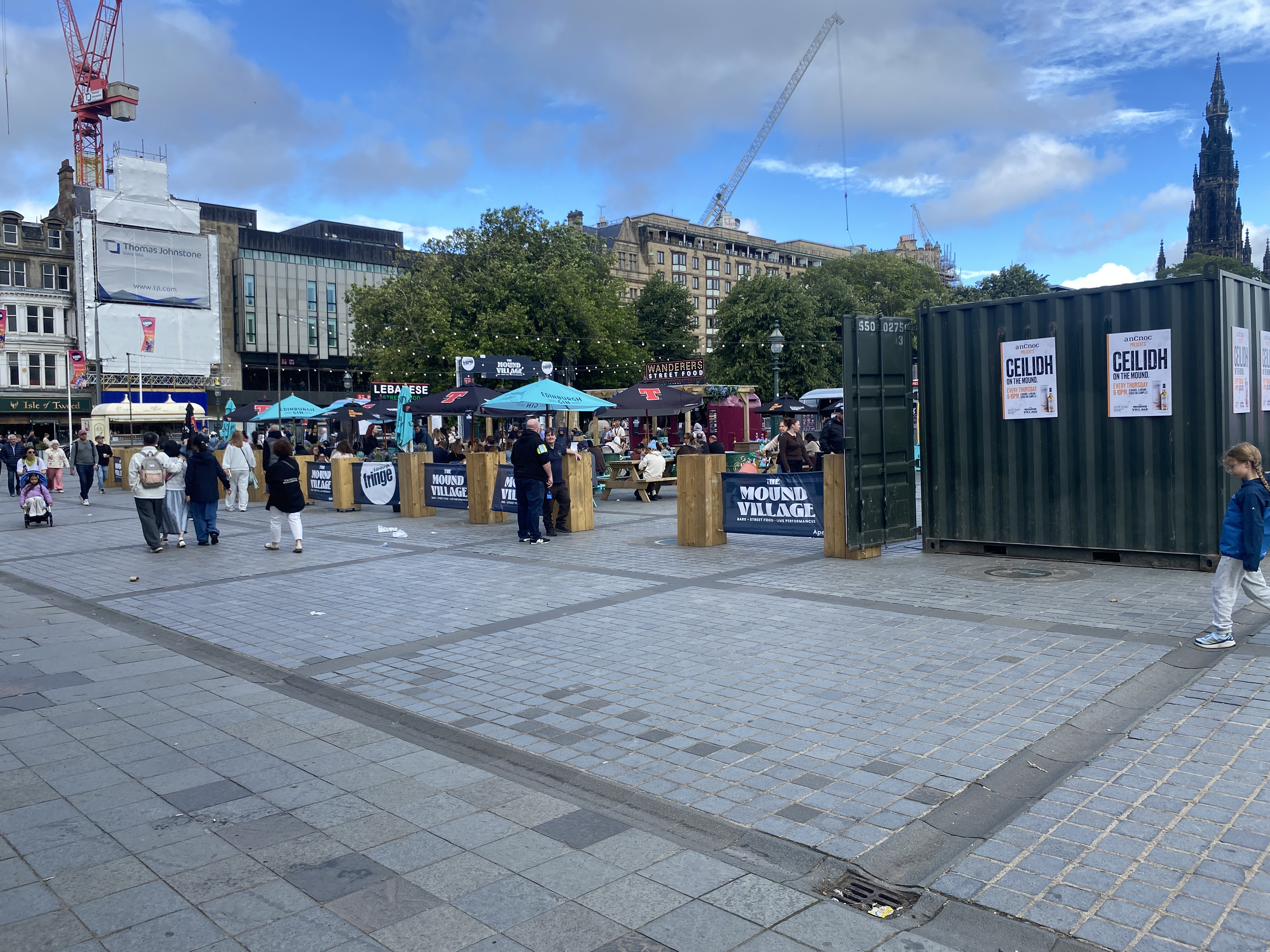
- Food stalls at the Mound, Edinburgh during the Fringe Festival
  7 to 31 August – The annual Edinburgh Fringe festival takes place in the Scottish Capital.
- 10 August
  - 2026 United Kingdom heatwaves:
    - Amber heat health alerts are issued for most of England, effective from 9am on 11 August until 9am on 14 August, with temperatures forecast to reach 36°C on 13 August.
    - 71.3% of England is now reported to be in drought, along with the whole of Wales.
    - 120 firefighters are reported to be tackling a wildfire on protected heathland in the New Forest that broke out the previous day following a van fire.
  - A small boat carrying 230 people, the largest number on a single vessel of its type, crosses the English Channel in the early hours of the morning.
  - Burnham announces plans to outlaw subscription traps, whereby it is not made clear how to cancel subscriptions for online content or services.
  - A domestic violence victim tells BBC Breakfast how she was attacked in a hotel room by her abuser after staff at a Travelodge reception gave him a key.
  - It is reported that Steve Buck, Thames Water's finance chief, was paid a £1m signing-on fee in July after working for them for 15 months.
  - Burnham announces plans to give councils greater powers to require new vape shops to have planning permission, and to block betting shops in an effort to improve the diversity of high street shops.
- 10 to 16 August – The 2026 European Athletics Championships are held at the Alexander Stadium in Birmingham.
- 11 August
  - 2026 United Kingdom heatwaves:
    - The Met Office issues an amber weather warning for extreme heat, with parts of England now forecast to reach 38°C on 13 August; the highest temperatures are expected to be in the east, south east and parts of the Midlands, where disruption to transport is likely.
    - The Met Office says the summer of 2026 is on course to be the hottest on record.
  - Data from Airports Council International shows that Heathrow Airport has lost its title as Europe's busiest airport, with Istanbul Airport seeing a greater volume of passenger traffic in July. Figures show that 8.15m people passed through Istanbul, compared to 7.86 through Heathrow.
  - Stocks of eclipse glasses run low ahead of the following day's solar eclipse.
  - Actress Lucy Davis reveals that she has terminal breast cancer.
- 12 August
  - Office for National Statistics data indicates the UK economy grew by 0.4% between April and June, with contributing factors including the hot weather and summer sporting events.
  - The government names the first 43 electricity transmission projects whose nearby households will receive annual £250 discounts on their electricity bills for up to ten years. The scheme applies to households within 500 metres (1,600 ft) of new or upgraded pylons and substations across Great Britain.
  - 2026 United Kingdom heatwaves:
    - Burnham chairs a COBRA meeting to discuss the UK's response to the extreme heat, attended by ministers from the Department for Environment, Food and Rural Affairs, Home Office, and Department for Health, as well as the Environment Agency.
    - Firefighters continue to tackle a wildfire in the New Forest, Hampshire, which started on Sunday 9 August and now covers an area of 1.6 sq km (400 acres). Multiple road closures remain in place in the area.
  - Serial sex offender Simon Levy is given a whole life order for murdering two women and raping a third while on bail for a string of other offences.
  - Millions of people across the UK gather to view a partial solar eclipse, the most significant in the country since 11 August 1999, with over 95% of the Sun obscured in Cornwall and the Isles of Scilly.
- 12 to 16 August – The 2026 Boomtown Festival take place in Hampshire. Acts include Kneecap, Madness, Scissor Sisters, Faithless, The Vengaboys and Groove Armada.
- 13 August
  - A Level, T Level and BTEC results are published in England, Wales and Northern Ireland, with the percentage of A or A* grades at A Level increasing for the third consecutive year.
  - 2026 United Kingdom heatwaves:
    - The hottest day of the year so far is recorded, with a high of 38.1 °C in Kew Gardens, London, surpassing the previous high of 38 °C in Lingwood, Norfolk, on 26 June. An amber extreme heat warning remains in place for parts of England until midnight.
    - A&E departments in England are reported to be experiencing their busiest summer ever, largely due to the record-breaking heat. Preliminary figures suggest almost 2.5 million people attended an A&E in the previous month, while more than 2,800 heat-related deaths occurred in May and June – almost double the total of 2025.
    - Multiple large wildfires are reported around the country, injuring several people and destroying a number of homes. A major incident is declared in Warwickshire.
  - A train derails near Lewes in East Sussex. Twenty people are injured, two of them seriously.
- 14 August
  - 2026 Clacton by-election:
    - Nigel Farage is re-elected as Clacton's MP with 22,239 votes; Count Binface receives 9,455 votes and a 26.9% share, reported as the highest ever for a novelty candidate.
    - The parliamentary investigation into Farage's £5m donation is reopened following his election win.
  - 2026 United Kingdom heatwaves:
    - At 7pm, millions of mobile phone users in England and Wales receive an Emergency Alert warning against lighting anything that could spark a wildfire, such as barbecues, campfires, and fireworks.
    - The UK government deploys 100 army personnel, initially to South Wales, to help tackle wildfires.
    - Burnham announces a temporary ban on the sale of disposable barbecues.
    - Judith Blake is appointed as fire minister, serving in the Ministry of Housing, Communities and Local Government.
  - A train derails at Wickford in Essex with 45 passengers on board. No injuries are reported.
  - Jason Arday, the former University of Cambridge professor at the centre of a plagiarism scandal, is found dead at an address in Battersea, south London.
- 16 August – Domestic violence campaigners raise concerns that the Emergency Alert issued by the government could have put abuse victims with secret emergency phones to call for help at risk.
- 17 August
  - The Office of Rail and Road grants Virgin Trains track access rights to High Speed 1 for up to 20 daily return services between London and Paris, Brussels and Amsterdam from 2030, paving the way for the first competition to Eurostar on cross-Channel passenger rail services.
  - Following criticism from charities and domestic abuse survivors that the lack of advance warning could expose people using secret phones, the UK government defends its decision to issue an Emergency Alert about wildfires in England and Wales as "entirely appropriate".
  - Reform UK announces more proposals that form part of their plan to cut welfare spending by £50 billion, including requiring long-term benefit claimants deemed able to work to undertake community work or risk losing their payments, restricting disability and sickness benefits, and barring most foreign nationals from claiming benefits.
- 18 August
  - A young British couple are reported to have been killed in a helicopter crash while on honeymoon on the Greek island of Sifnos.
  - Wetherspoons bans its customers from playing loud music on mobile devices and taking calls on speaker, citing it as a disturbance to other customers.
  - The UK Health Security Agency launches an investigation into a salmonella outbreak that is suspected to come from food made with imported eggs, which has left one person dead and a further 200 ill.
- 19 August
  - UK inflation rose to 2.9% in the year to July, fuelled by an increase in energy prices.
  - The UK adds seven additional designations under the Iran sanctions system.
  - BBC News reports that the Duke and Duchess of Sussex are planning to return to the UK later in the month.
  - A report into the Lewes derailment finds a defect in the track near the site of the incident.
  - Male prisons in England and Wales have fewer than 1,800 spaces left, their lowest figure since March.
  - The UK government publishes an online guide explaining to asylum seekers the behaviour that is expected of them in the UK.
- 20 August
  - The 2026 GCSE results are published in England, Wales and Northern Ireland.
  - BBC Radio 2 presenter Trevor Nelson reveals he stepped away from broadcasting earlier in the year to undergo surgery for a brain tumour, which he says has gone "incredibly well".
- 21 August
  - Office for National Statistics figures show UK government borrowing for July 2026 was £1.8bn, higher than the £500m forecast by experts.
  - The Met Office warns that the current El Niño is set to become the strongest in living memory, putting the UK at greater risk of a wet, stormy autumn. It also means that 2027 will "very likely" be the hottest year on record globally.
  - The first annual national day "to honour and remember" the victims of terrorism in the UK takes place.
- 22 August – Seven people including two police officers are killed in a crash on the A66 near Middlesbrough involving a police vehicle and a Volkswagen Passat.
- 23 August
  - Train operator CrossCountry cancels almost all of its UK services following a major power cut.
  - Police confirm the names of all seven victims of the previous day's crash, which involved a car travelling the wrong way down the motorway and colliding with a marked police vehicle. Tributes are paid to PC Matthew Blades, 37, and PC Tom Clough, 38. The five occupants of the Passat are named as Michael Robert Cahill, 23, Theo Rae, 17, Cole Robert Worthy, 16, Jacob Matusiak, 23, and Makai Saddington, 18.
  - The UK government announces that Mayors across England will be given new powers to overrule local councils on some planning decisions.
  - Justice Secretary Alex Norris announces that a scheme restricting the movement of serious sexual and violent offenders following their release from prison will launch in October.
  - Reform UK announces plans to prioritise social housing for young British-born workers should it form a government.
- 24 August
  - Bradley Townsend, a British national from South Yorkshire, is killed in Ukraine while fighting for Russia.
  - Andy Burnham arrives in Kyiv, his first foreign visit since becoming UK prime minister, to chair a meeting of more than 35 nations backing Ukraine in its defence against Russia. He will hand over blueprints so that Ukraine can build its own long-range missiles.
  - Nine men and three women, aged between 19 and 61, are arrested on suspicion of several offences relating to the car crash near Middlesbrough that killed seven people including two police officers on 22 August.
  - The UK government urges social media platforms to remove posts celebrating dangerous driving.
  - Former world snooker champion Graeme Dott is found guilty of child sexual abuse.
  - The Duke of Sussex steps down from the board of the African wildlife charity African Parks after allegations some of their rangers have mistreated indigenous people.
- 25 August
  - Five further arrests are made in connection with the Middlesbrough car crash on 22 August, bringing the total number of arrests to 17.
  - The Met Office issues yellow weather warnings for heavy rain and thunderstorms in large parts of England and Wales, covering Wednesday 26 August and Thursday 27 August.
- 26 August
  - Ofgem announces an 8% increase in the price cap for domestic gas from 1 October, leading to a 3.6% rise in typical variable rate energy bills.
  - Thirty-three British nationals are among hundreds of foreign tourists reported missing after flash flooding on the Nepal–Tibet border.
  - Buckingham Palace announces that the King and Queen will make an eight-day visit to the Caribbean later in the year.
  - The Duke and Duchess of Sussex return to the UK after previously announcing their plans to do so.
  - A 21-year-old man from Wakefield is sentenced to 28 months in jail after making death threats to Al-Sunnah and Iqra Mosques in Manchester, England in October 2025.
  - University College London reports that London neurosurgeons have performed the first AI-assisted brain surgery at the National Hospital for Neurology and Neurosurgery, in a 48-year-old patient who was diagnosed with a brain tumour in 2024.
- 27 August
  - The UK government pledges £5 million in aid to Nepal following the flash floods and offers to send emergency responders.
  - The UK Health Security Agency reports that the number of people affected by the recent outbreak of salmonella has risen to nearly 500, with two deaths. Two new clusters of the infection have been identified, believed to be linked to the import of foreign eggs.
  - Plug-in solar panels become legal to buy and use across Great Britain, allowing households to generate electricity through systems connected directly to a standard power socket.
  - The Home Office announces that the number of asylum seekers in hotels has halved in a year.
- 28 August
  - At a hearing at the Old Bailey, four men plead guilty to an arson attack in north London that destroyed four Jewish community ambulances, causing £1m of damage.
  - A 41-year-old man is killed and six other people are injured after a large sign falls over at the Big Church Festival near Steyning in West Sussex. The deceased man is subsequently named as Pastor Robert Guanco.
- 29 August
  - Sir James Cleverly resigns from the shadow cabinet in order to run as a candidate in the 2028 London mayoral election.
  - The Local Government Association warns of a buildup of discarded fridges and freezers in waste centres in England and Wales, due to a lack of specialist dismantlers compounded by appliances breaking down during the summer heatwaves.
- 30 August – Burnham announces changes to the early prisoner release scheme that will preclude anyone convicted of unlawful killing from being eligible for the scheme.
- 31 August
  - 2026 British shadow cabinet reshuffle: Kemi Badenoch reshuffles the Shadow Cabinet, appointing Andrew Griffith as Shadow Chancellor of the Exchequer in place of Mel Stride. Claire Coutinho succeeds Griffith as Shadow Business Secretary, while Tom Tugendhat replaces Priti Patel as Shadow Foreign Secretary.
  - Bank of England Governor Andrew Bailey warns G20 finance ministers that a collapse of the AI bubble could lead to a downturn in the global economy.
  - The UK government announces plans to create extra prison cells in England and Wales from unutilised space as a way of tackling the shortage of prison places.

=== September ===
- 1 September
  - The cost of long-term government borrowing rises to 5.89%, its highest rate since October 1998.
  - Sir Keir Starmer announces he is standing down as an MP to focus on a role in international affairs, triggering a by-election in his London constituency.
  - Provisional data from the Met Office suggests the summer of 2026 is now the hottest on record.
  - Israel's Foreign Minister, Gideon Saar, warns Israel will retaliate if the UK imposes sanctions against it over the potential expansion of settlements in the West Bank.
- 2 September
  - The UK government publishes the plans for the early release of prisoners in England and Wales; 700 will be released on the morning of 1 October, with 2,500 released by the end of the year.
  - King Charles III, Andy Burnham and French President Emmanuel Macron view the Bayeux Tapestry exhibition at the British Museum ahead of its opening to the public.
- 3 September
  - The first robotaxis with a driver supervising are launched by Uber in London.
  - Burnham meets French president Emmanuel Macron at 10 Downing Street to discuss illegal immigration, defence, and Ukraine, as well as strengthening the UK-EU relationship.
  - BBC News reports that the Army has been told to pause non-essential training exercises in order to save money.
- 4 September
  - Reform UK's head of policy James Orr and senior Nigel Farage aide Dan Jukes step down pending an internal investigation after a Channel 4 News undercover report alleges they sought to circumvent rules prohibiting foreign political donations. Labour and the Liberal Democrats report Reform to the Metropolitan Police, while Conservative leader Kemi Badenoch calls for police and Electoral Commission investigations.
  - Following comments made about the sovereignty of the Falkland Islands by the Argentinian president, Downing Street says that the UK's position on the islands is "unwavering".
- 5 September
  - Major disruption occurs at the Port of Dover after hundreds of masked "stop the boats" protesters block access.
  - Jaguar Land Rover announces it has opened a voluntary redundancy programme in an attempt to save £1.7bn over the next two years.
  - Police appeal for a woman who appears to have her hair pulled in video footage of the Reform Party Conference to come forward so they can investigate.
- 6 September – Welsh player, Jak Jones, wins the final of the British Open snooker tournament, his second ranking title.
- 7 September – Jaguar Land Rover announces plans to cut 4,000 jobs as it struggles with competition from China, the transition to electric vehicles and US tariffs.
- 8 September
  - Foreign Secretary Ed Miliband announces plans to ban imports of goods from Israeli settlements in the occupied West Bank, in coordination with France, Canada and nine other European countries. (Note: However, countries other than the UK, Canada, and France clarified that settlement trade restrictions are contingent on EU action.)
  - Miliband announces sanctions on the Hezbollah-affiliated Al-Qard Al-Hasan Association.
  - The UK government announces £30 million of investment in SaxaVord Spaceport in Shetland as part of a new national space strategy.
  - Prince George arrives at Eton College for his first day of secondary education.
  - A fault with NATS's flight processing system causes flight delays and cancellations at airports across the United Kingdom.
- 9 September
  - During Prime Minister’s Questions, Andy Burnham suggests that another Scottish independence referendum could be held if public opinion shows demand for one.
  - The Metropolitan Police launches a criminal investigation into Reform UK's donations, following the Channel 4 News report broadcast on 3 September.
  - Channel 4 announces plans to shed 340 jobs by the end of the year following a strategic review.
  - Brent crude exceeds $100/barrel for the first time since July, amid the ongoing Iran War.
- 10 September
  - The RNLI reviews its security procedures after volunteers are targeted online following protests in Dover and Portsmouth over the charity's involvement in assisting around 120 migrants intercepted off the Isle of Wight. Some volunteers had their names and photographs shared on social media and were accused of treason, prompting the RNLI to advise members that they could avoid wearing branded clothing in some circumstances.
  - Four men are stabbed during a fight on Bromley High Street in south-east London, leaving one in a critical condition. Seven people are arrested.
  - The Bayeux Tapestry goes on public display in the UK for the first time.
- 11 September
  - Office for National Statistics data indicates the UK economy grew by 0.4% in July, faster than had been forecast; this is attributed to businesses using artificial intelligence.
  - A second attempt to legalise assisted dying in England and Wales is rejected by the Commons, in a vote of 286–270. The bill would have allowed adults with fewer than six months to live to apply to be given help to end their own life, subject to certain safeguards.
  - An event to mark the 25th anniversary of the September 11 attacks is held in London's Queen Elizabeth Olympic Park.
  - The UK government rejects suggestions to create a "kill switch" to stop a potential attack by AI.
- 12 September – Reform UK receives two £36 million donations from cryptocurrency billionaires Ben Delo and Christopher Harborne, jointly the largest individual donations ever made to a UK political party and totalling £72 million.
- 14 September
  - With the governments of Scotland, Wales and Northern Ireland all led by nationalist parties for the first time, the leaders of the SNP, Plaid Cymru and Sinn Féin meet in Cardiff, signing a agreement which says "No Westminster government has the right to block democracy or undermine the principle that our people will decide their own future."
  - Prime Minister Andy Burnham cancels all official engagements for 14 and 15 September following the death of his father, Roy.
- 15 September – The village of Piddington, Oxfordshire votes in a referendum in favour of leaving the United Kingdom over plans to house up to 1,256 male asylum seekers at nearby MoD Bicester.
- 16 September
  - Police searching for Noah Woods, a partially deaf and non-verbal three-year-old boy, recover the body of a child from Decoy Pond in Brantham, Suffolk, after he disappeared from a nearby playground the previous day. More than 1,300 volunteers had joined emergency services in the search. Formal identification is yet to take place, but Woods' family are informed of the discovery.
  - London's Natural History Museum reopens a gallery that has been closed to the public since 1943.
- 17 September
  - The Bank of England, in a 6–3 vote by its Monetary Policy Committee, keeps interest rates on hold at 3.75%, despite rising inflation.
  - The King opens the AI Summit at Dumfries House in Ayrshire. In a speech, he warns of the "existential dangers" of AI falling into the wrong hands, and calls for sufficient controls "before it is all too late".
  - The National Institute for Health and Care Excellence reverses its 2024 decision and recommends trastuzumab deruxtecan (Enhertu) for routine NHS use in England for patients with HER2-low advanced breast cancer, making around 1,000 patients a year eligible for the treatment.
  - A 56-year-old man is arrested after human remains found in woodland in south-west London are identified as mother-of-three Joanne Sheen, missing since December 2019.
  - Archbishop of Canterbury Dame Sarah Mullally withdraws an award presented to Islamic cleric Hafiz Muhammad Tahir Mehmood Ashrafi for reconciliation and interfaith cooperation after he praised Osama bin Laden.
- 18 September
  - Burnham meets Irish Taoiseach Micheál Martin for talks at Number 10 North in Manchester.
  - An investigation into an air traffic control failure that led to widespread disruption earlier in September has concluded that it was caused by a software glitch, the National Air Traffic Service says.
  - A teenager who piloted a dinghy carrying 165 migrants across the English Channel is sentenced to two years and three months in prison.
- 20 September
  - Two men are arrested on suspicion of plotting a terrorist attack against Manchester's Jewish community.
  - Chiltern Railways is renationalised after 30 years as a private company, becoming the 10th rail company now part of Great British Railways (GBR), the government's programme of public ownership.
  - The original West End run of the two-part play Harry Potter and the Cursed Child closes after ten years. It is scheduled to reopen as a one-part play in October.
- 21 September
  - Burnham announces that courts specialising in rape and sexual offence cases will be established in England and Wales over the next two years.
  - Former BBC Radio 1 and Capital Xtra DJ Tim Westwood is charged with two more sexual offences: an indecent assault in 1991 in Hammersmith and Fulham against a teenage girl aged 16–17, and a sexual assault in 2004 in Wandsworth of an 18-year-old woman.
- 22 September
  - Office for National Statistics data indicates government borrowing for August was £3.5bn higher than experts had forecast.
  - Andy Burnham meets US President Donald Trump in New York during the United Nations General Assembly, their first face-to-face meeting since Burnham became prime minister. The two discuss trade, migration, the wars in Ukraine and the Middle East, the Chagos Islands, the Falkland Islands and the detention of British citizen Jimmy Lai.
  - The UK announces that an RAF Voyager air-to-air refuelling aircraft will support Saudi Arabian forces defending against attacks by the Houthis, following a request from the Saudi government.
  - Ineos announces that it is mothballing its three chemical plants in Hull, Europe's last remaining world-scale acetyls plants, citing high energy costs. The facilities support almost 4,000 jobs in the region.
- 23 September
  - BBC News reports that the British military has been jamming or blocking satellites from other countries to defend itself from hostile threats.
  - Two pilots eject and parachute out of an RAF jet before it crashes during a training exercise in Anglesey, North Wales.
  - Burnham announces plans to set up a new centre to tackle disinformation, including from countries such as Russia.
  - Police are investigating an online video that appears to show anti-migration activist Daniel Thomas slashing a dinghy with a knife while several people are on board, including an emergency responder. He is arrested the following day by Hampshire and Isle of Wight Constabulary, and charged with criminal damage.
  - Admiral Insurance announces plans to cut 500 jobs in the UK.
  - The UK government announces plans to introduce new vocational GCSE courses in topics such as business management and construction for secondary school students in England by 2029.
- 24 September
  - Reports of incidents of violence and harassment on the UK's rail network increased by 36% in the year to March 2026, when compared with the previous 12-month period.
  - The UK announces an £88 million aid package for Palestine.
- 25 September
  - Dyfed-Powys Police confirm they have been the victim of a cyberattack which may have compromised staff information.
  - An independent panel finds Manchester City F.C. guilty of breaking the majority of 115 financial rules they were accused of breaching, with sanctions to be decided at a later hearing.
  - Daniel Thomas, appearing at Basingstoke Magistrates' Court in Hampshire via videolink, pleads not guilty to criminal damage and failing to disclose the PIN to his phone, following his arrest the previous day.
- 26 September
  - The Metropolitan Police announces that it is re-examining CCTV footage from the 1999 Jill Dando murder case.
  - Burnham announces a £210m investment package to regenerate the UK's communities and high streets.
  - Burnham announces the "Your First Home" scheme, designed to help first time buyers in England get on the property ladder.
- 27 September
  - Prior to the Orange walk, protesters block a Catholic area in Portadown.
  - A major incident is declared near RAF Fairford in Gloucestershire, after several men were arrested on suspicion of preparing a terrorist act and committing offences under the Explosives Act. Residents in the nearby village of Whelford are evacuated to a leisure centre while investigations continue.
  - Burnham announces plans for a National Care Service as part of Labour's manifesto at the next general election.
  - Ten NHS staff are to be removed or suspended from their posts following a data breach involving the medical records of Noah Woods.
  - Detectives are granted an extra week to question two men arrested on suspicion of planning a terrorist attack against Manchester's Jewish community.
- 28 September
  - The RAC reports that diesel has reached an all-time high of 199.18p per litre, as the ongoing Iran war continues to push up prices. Petrol has also risen further, with a litre now at 174.13p.
  - The UK government announces that train operator Avanti West Coast will be nationalised from March 2027.
  - Merseyside Police arrest 50 pro-Palestine Action protesters outside the Labour Party Conference.
- 29 September
  - Following his conviction on 24 August, former snooker world champion Graeme Dott is sentenced at Edinburgh's high court to seven years in prison for sexually abusing two children.
  - Burnham tells the Labour Party Conference that the government will end the pensions "triple lock" and instead move to a "double lock" by 2030. He also announces a new "national care service", as well as plans for electoral reform, an overhaul of the leasehold system for housing, and greater public ownership of water companies.
  - The Premier League confirms that Manchester City F.C. has been found guilty of breaching its rules, including arranging sham contracts with its commercial partners.
  - The UK government announces that the universal free admission policy of England's national museums will not be changed.
- 30 September
  - Burnham tells BBC Radio 4's Today programme that Brexit has caused "more harm than good" and that the UK should consider "options" to clarify its relationship with Europe.
  - The Metropolitan Police submits its final investigation files into the 2017 Grenfell Tower fire to the Crown Prosecution Service, relating to 54 individuals and 20 companies and organisations. Potential charges include corporate manslaughter, gross negligence manslaughter, health and safety offences, fraud and misconduct in public office.
  - Burnham says the UK government believes Iran played a part in the incident at RAF Fairford.
  - The UK government announces the "one in, one out" agreement with France allowing the UK to return some migrants to France has been scrapped.
  - Greggs announces plans to close four of its factories with the loss of 740 jobs.

=== October ===
- 1 October
  - Around 700 prisoners are released from prisons in England and Wales as new early-release rules under the Sentencing Act 2026 come into force. The changes allow many prisoners serving standard determinate sentences to be released after serving a smaller proportion of their custodial term.
  - A new excise duty on vaping products comes into force across the UK, charging £2.20 per 10 ml of vaping liquid, including products without nicotine.
  - The yield on 30-year UK government bonds exceeds 6% for the first time since 1998, amid a global bond sell-off and continuing inflationary pressure from the Iran war.
  - A 25-year-old dual UK-Iranian national becomes the sixth person arrested in connection with the suspected terrorist activity near RAF Fairford, on suspicion of preparation of terrorist acts. Counter Terrorism Policing says it is investigating possible foreign state involvement.
- 2 October
  - The price of diesel in the UK exceeds £2/litre for the first time, as the Iran war continues to put pressure on supplies.
  - A suspect in the killing of Ann Widdecombe is charged with plotting a terrorist attack against Nigel Farage.
  - Two Iranian nationals are charged with terrorist offences relating to a targeted plot against Manchester's Jewish community.
- 3 October – Wakefield Trinity win the 2026 Super League Grand Final after defeating Warrington Wolves 23–10.
- 4 October
  - At the Green Party conference, members back a 'Zionism is racism' motion.
  - The British Museum announces changes to how visitors see the Bayeux Tapestry to ease long queueing times, including later opening hours, audio tours and more seating.
  - Trump withdraws all US bombers from RAF Fairford, an air base targeted by an attack that the UK linked to the Iranian government, due to urgent concerns about a potentially complex drone attack ordered by the IRGC as part of a plot to target the aircraft and kill American soldiers at RAF Fairford, loosely modelled after Ukraine's Operation Spiderweb.
- 8 October – Holborn and St Pancras by-election: Labour retain the seat, with Camden council leader Sagal Abdi-Wali elected as the constituency's MP.
- 9 October
  - It emerges that The King has paid Andrew Mountbatten-Windsor's £1.5m repair bill for the maintenance of his former home at Royal Lodge in Windsor.
  - Northern Ireland Secretary Sir Chris Bryant announces he will ban the contentious Orange Order parade at Drumcree.
- 10 October
  - A man is killed by a tiger at Yorkshire Wildlife Park after he entered the animal's enclosure.
  - In a letter to the National Cyber Security Centre, The King warns of the challenges posed by disinformation and other "hostile online activity" to trust and security in the digital age.
  - James Deller is dismissed as the Metropolitan Police head of Special Constabulary after Palantir's AI monitoring uncovered that he had used his work phone to copy intimate images of a woman.
- 11 October
  - The UK government launches a new taskforce to respond to extreme weather conditions, such as flooding.
  - Burnham tells The Rest Is Politics podcast that it was "clear" Russia had interfered in the 2016 Brexit vote.
- 12 October
  - The trial of Russell Brand begins, having been delayed from June after further charges were brought.
  - Home Secretary Shabana Mahmood announces that political figures who are not serving MPs will be provided with police support.
  - A health and safety investigation is launched into the death of a man in the tiger enclosure at Yorkshire Wildlife Park.
  - CrossCountry announces plans to add eight additional trains to its fleet, with an estimated 60,000 extra train seats each week.
- 13 October
  - The International Monetary Fund upgrades the UK's economic growth forecast for 2026, but warns higher interest rates and fuel prices will have an impact during 2027.
  - MI5 Director Sir Ken McCallum says the organisation is devoting more resources to countering state threats than during the Cold War, with threats posed by Russia and Iran, as well as from artificial intelligence.
  - The person killed by a tiger at Yorkshire Wildlife Park is identified as a man in his mid-20s, and a former child actor.
  - A further 650 offenders are freed in England and Wales under the early release scheme.

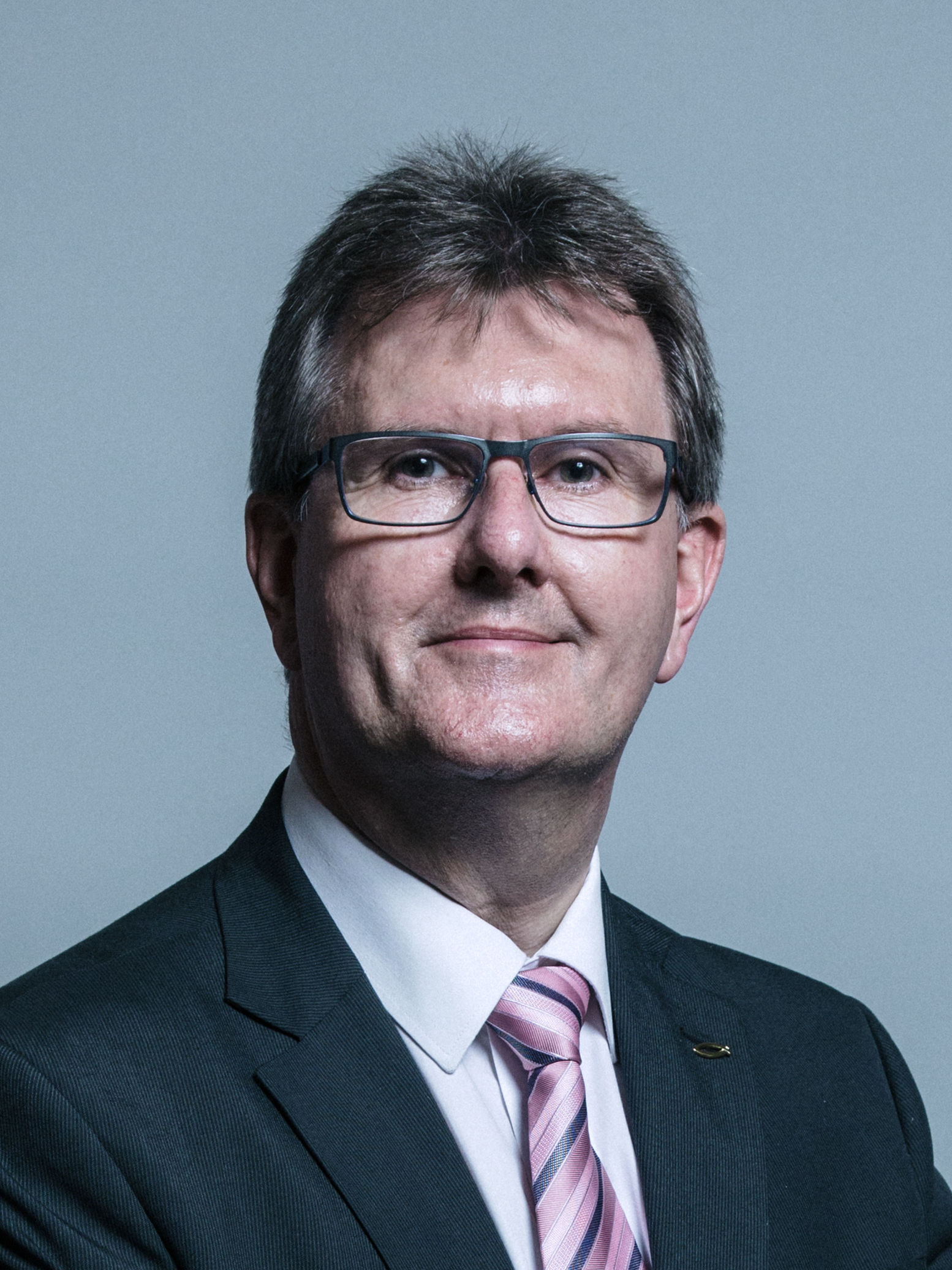
15 October: Former DUP leader Jeffrey Donaldson is sentenced to 15 years in prison for child sex abuse.

- 14 October
  - The family of the man killed by a tiger at Yorkshire Wildlife Park urge people to stop sharing footage of the incident after US President Donald Trump posted a video of it on his Truth Social platform, along with an AI-generated video of him taming a tiger.
  - The trial of actor and comedian Russell Brand begins at Southwark Crown Court. He faces three counts of rape, three charges of sexual assault and one of indecent assault, dating back to between 1999 and 2009.
  - A review of drop-off charges at airports is launched after they underwent a sharp increase.
  - Irish author Sally Rooney says her books will no longer be supplied to retailers in the UK because of her support for Palestine Action.
- 15 October
  - Former DUP leader Jeffrey Donaldson is sentenced to 15 years in prison for child sex abuse.
  - Severe drought conditions are declared in parts of southern England following months of low rainfall. Two major reservoirs in the region are now reported to be at less than 20% capacity.
  - An inquest is opened into the death of the man killed by a tiger at Yorkshire Wildlife Park, with proceedings adjurned until March 2027.
  - Updated guidance from NHS England states that trans people should use hospital spaces according to biological sex.
- 16 October
  - A 19-year-old Norwegian man is sentenced to 20 years imprisonment for plotting murder in the UK for the Iran-linked organised crime gang Foxtrot.
  - The UK government says it will reform the scheme that provides financial support for people injured or bereaved by vaccines.
  - Yorkshire Wildlife Park reopens for the first time since the death of the man in the tiger enclosure.
- 18 October
  - Police begin a search for two suspects after a police officer was shot and injured in Nottingham.
  - The BBC announces a pause of secondments for government statisticians to its fact checking service, BBC Verify, following a report in The Telegraph which said embedded civil servants had been engaging in editorial tasks, raising questions about a breach of impartiality rules.
- 19 October
  - Four arrests are made following the previous day's shooting of a police officer in Nottingham.
  - The Met Office issues a yellow weather alert for high winds for parts of southwest England on Friday 23 October as the first named windstorm of the autumn is forecast.
- 20 October – Defence secretary Wes Streeting announces that the UK will increase its airborne assistance to support Saudi Arabia against Houthi drone and missile attacks.
- 21 October
  - The UK's total government debt is estimated to have reached £3tn for the first time.
  - Inflation rises from 3.1% to 3.5%, its highest level for nearly a year, although food prices are reported to have fallen slightly between August and September.
  - The UK government approves drilling at the Jackdaw gas field in the North Sea. Energy Secretary Miatta Fahnbulleh says the move "will support the country's energy security with homegrown gas this winter and help minimise the UK’s use of imported higher emission fuels", while environmental campaigners and Green Party leader Zack Polanski criticise the decision for its climate impact.
  - The King, Queen and Prince of Wales join survivors and bereaved families in Aberfan to commemorate the 60th anniversary of the Aberfan disaster, which killed 116 children and 28 adults.
- 22 October
  - Following the discovery of a high-impact security vulnerability in PHP, a programming language used by most of the World Wide Web, many websites are temporarily taken offline as a precautionary measure. The UK government says it is working to identify any potential exposure of its online services, and urges "all organisations, private and public, large and small" to follow guidance to protect their systems.
  - In cricket, captain Harry Brook becomes the first England batter to make a double century in a one-day international, with 202 runs against Sri Lanka in Rawalpindi.
  - Defence Secretary Wes Streeting announces that the government is launching a "national resilience conversation" to raise awareness of potential supply chain disruptions from climate emergencies or state-sponsored terrorism.
- 23 October
  - Storm Austen: More than 13,000 homes in Wales, Cornwall, Devon and other parts of England are affected by power cuts caused by Storm Austen. A yellow weather warning for wind is in place across England and Wales.
  - Royal Air Force Typhoon fighter jets take part in a French nuclear deterrent exercise over the Mediterranean Sea amid increased regional security concerns brought on by Russia's ongoing invasion of Ukraine. Codenamed "Exercise Rummy," it is the first time that France and the UK have collaborated to simulate an airborne nuclear attack.
  - Authorities in the Philippines confirm an investigation into allegations that Thomas Markle, the estranged father of Meghan, Duchess of Sussex, possessed child sexual abuse images. Markle denies the allegations, while the Duchess says she is "deeply distressed" and reveals that she was informed of earlier allegations against her father in 2018.
- 24 October – Storm Boelo: Amber weather alerts for high winds and heavy rain come into force for northern parts of the UK.
- 25 October
  - Storm Boelo: The storm brings winds of up to 84 mph, widespread flooding and major transport disruption to Scotland, Northern Ireland and northern England, leaving more than 82,000 properties without electricity.
  - The Board of Deputies of British Jews declares the Green Party to be a racist party following its backing of a motion that Zionism is racist.
- 26 October
  - Oxford Street in central London, the UK's most famous shopping street, is pedestrianised between the junctions of Orchard Street and Great Portland Street.
  - Storm Boelo: Two men are reported to have been killed by falling trees, while the number of properties without power increases to 90,000. The Met Office issues a new yellow warning for strong winds from 18:00 on Monday 26 October to 03:00 on Tuesday 27 October across the west coast of England, Wales and Scotland and eastern parts of Northern Ireland.
  - An independent inquiry is announced into the circumstances surrounding the murder of Henry Nowak.
  - US singer Chris Brown is given an eight month prison sentence suspended for 12 months for striking a man with a tequila bottle in a London nightclub.
  - Harry Kane wins the 2026 Ballon d'Or, becoming the first English footballer to win the prize in 25 years.
  - 15 Sudanese military commanders, militia leaders, and security personnel from both sides of the civil war are sanctioned by the United Kingdom for allegedly perpetrating war crimes, including rape against children during the El Fasher massacre.
- 27 October
  - King Charles arrives in the Bahamas to begin nine day tour of the Caribbean, his first as monarch.
  - Two British nationals appear at Westminster Magistrates Court in connection with an alleged Iran-linked plot at RAF Fairford, and are remanded in custody to appear at the Old Bailey in November.
- 28 October – Chancellor John Healey delivers the 2026 United Kingdom budget, the first under Prime Minister Andy Burnham. Key measures include a £100 energy payment for 20 million households, the abolition of standing charges on gas bills, an extension of the temporary VAT cut on electricity, and a 3.9% increase in the minimum and living wages from April 2027. A temporary rise in the bank corporation tax surcharge from 3% to 6% is announced to fund energy support, while the £20,000 annual cash ISA allowance is retained. The Office for Budget Responsibility forecasts economic growth of 1.2% in 2026 and 1% in 2027.
- 29 October – Poundland files for administration, putting 12,000 jobs at risk.
- 30 October – Simon Richardson is found guilty of murdering head teacher Michael Mullins by dragging him for more than a mile while trapped under the wheels of a car. The judge tells Richardson he can expect life imprisonment when sentenced on Monday at Manchester's Minshull Street Crown Court.
- 31 October
  - A demonstration in support of Palestine Action takes place outside the US embassy in London. By the following day, police have made 325 arrests in connection with the protest.
  - Five teenagers are seriously injured after being stabbed at a Halloween party in Chandler's Ford, Hampshire.

=== November ===
- 1 November – Virgin Media O2 announces plans to cut a significant number of its workforce as it faces financial difficulties.
- 2–5 November – A series of bomb hoaxes disrupts dozens of passenger flights across Europe, including services from Luton, Heathrow, Manchester and Stansted, as well as two easyJet flights from Britain to Prague.
- 2 November – Karl Bushby completes his 28-year journey around the world, without any form of transport, having covered a distance of 31,000 miles (58,000 km) which began in Chile and ended in Hull, Yorkshire.
- 3 November – George Madgwick, the leader of Reform UK in Hampshire, is charged with 35 offences against four victims over a 13-year period, including rape, sexual assault, controlling or coercive behaviour, and making indecent images of a child.

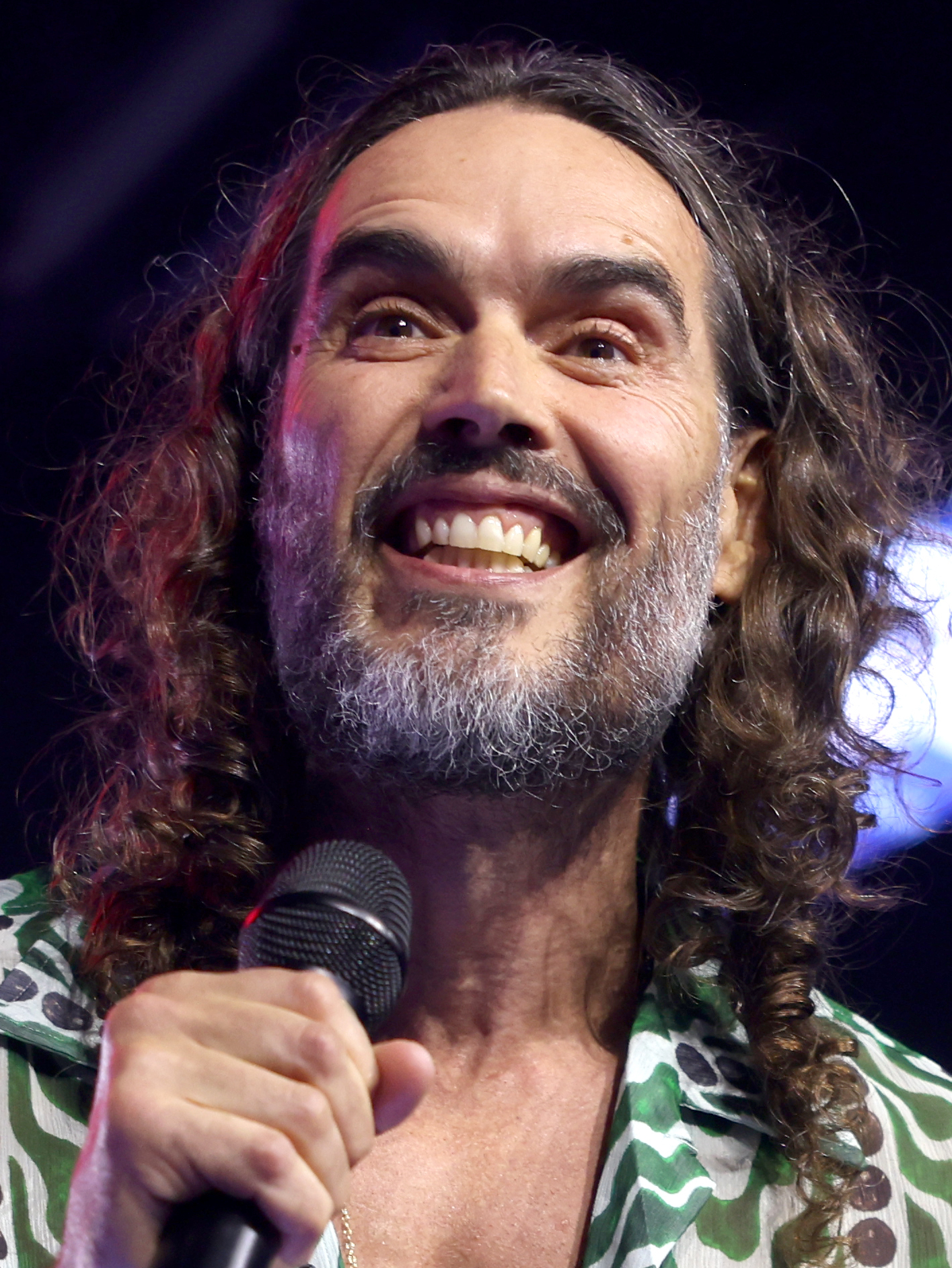
5 November: Russell Brand is convicted of rape and three counts of sexual assault.

- 4 November – The UK's largest Harry Potter store opens in London's Oxford Street.
- 5 November
  - The Bank of England raises its baseline interest rate from 3.75% to 4%, the first increase in more than three years. Andrew Bailey, the Bank's governor, says the decision "shouldn't be seen as the first in an inevitably long sequence of hikes", but warns "unless the conflict in the Middle East is resolved, neither does it seem likely to be the last increase".
  - Russell Brand is convicted at Southwark Crown Court of one count of rape and three counts of sexual assault and remanded in custody. He will be sentenced on 9 November. Shortly after the verdict, police announce two further inquiries into allegations of rape involving Brand.
- 7 November – A British citizen is reported to be among those killed in a mass shooting in Kraków, Poland.
- 9 November
  - Russell Brand is sentenced to 10-and-a-half years in prison for rape and sexual assault.
  - It is reported that a Parole Board hearing for Jon Venables has rejected an application for parole after he told the hearing he should remain in prison.
  - Civil servant Kashim Chowdhury, who secretly held multiple public sector jobs on full-time salaries, is convicted of nine counts of fraud.
  - The United States evacuates its military aircraft from RAF Mildenhall following a reported threat from Iran.
  - 2026 Booker Prize: At the age of 81, M John Harrison becomes the oldest author to win the Booker Prize with his post-apocalyptic novel The End of Everything.
- 10 November
  - A joint investigation by The Guardian and ITV News publishes allegations of sexual misconduct against comedian and children's author David Walliams, following the dismissal of his High Court bid to prevent publication. Walliams denies the allegations.
  - The first of a further 850 prisoners to be released early from prison to ease overcrowding walk free from prisons in England and Wales.
- 11 November – Broadcaster and TV personality Jonathan Ross issues a statement on David Walliams and Russell Brand, saying he was "on friendly terms with both men", but was "genuinely unaware of their conduct" and is now "as horrified by the revelations about [both men] as the rest of the nation".
- 12 November
  - Office for National Statistics data indicates the UK economy expanded by 0.7% between July and September, its fastest growth since 2024.
  - Two Iranian men are convicted in the UK of spying on dissident journalists for Iranian intelligence with the intention of attacking them for their criticism of the Iranian government.
  - Meta have disabled social media accounts on their platforms belonging to Russell Brand.
  - 2026 Microsoft outage: A global outage disrupts Microsoft 365 services, including Outlook, Teams and Copilot, affecting businesses and government agencies worldwide.
  - Six more women come forward with allegations of sexual misconduct and predatory behaviour by Russell Brand.
- 13 November
  - The Metropolitan Police launches an investigation into comedian and author David Walliams following allegations of "serious sexual offences".
  - Mohammed Alfatih, a former bodyguard of slain Hamas chief Ismail Haniyeh and the son of senior Hamas official Basem Naim, is found guilty of attacking a court officer who had come to collect debts from his wife outside his Birmingham home in October 2025 after being granted asylum and citizenship.
- 14 November – The average price of a UK home is reported to be lower in real terms than in 2002, having dropped by £63,000 over the last five years when adjusted for inflation.
- 16 November – Robert Pattinson is named as the seventh actor to play James Bond, succeeding Daniel Craig in the role.
- 17 November
  - The UK sanctions eight Israeli firms linked to West Bank settlement building and an activist group that obstructs aid to Gaza.
  - A major review into youth unemployment is published, proposing widespread changes to tax, welfare, and education. Alan Milburn one of the report's authors, says the changes could help 440,000 young people into work by 2036.
- 18 November
  - Office for National Statistics data indicates that UK inflation rose to 3.6% in October, prompted by higher petrol and diesel prises.
  - Consultancy firm Cornwall Insight forecasts that the average gas and electricity bill will rise by 26% in January 2027, adding £443 to a typical bill.
  - Birmingham City Council wins a High Court injunction preventing the unauthorised attachment of flags to lamp posts across the city.
  - The BBC reports that Google declined a UK government request to remove a video from Russell Brand's YouTube channel, in which his wife reads out a message from him with a "not guilty" claim.
- 19 November
  - The ongoing COVID-19 Inquiry publishes its latest report, the seventh of ten, finding that inadequate testing, contact tracing and self-isolation systems allowed the virus to spread "virtually unchecked" during the first three months of the pandemic. It also criticises the lack of early international border controls and makes nine recommendations for improving preparedness for future pandemics.
  - Rockstar Games releases Grand Theft Auto VI, developed by Edinburgh-based Rockstar North, marking the first main instalment in the Scottish-originated Grand Theft Auto series since 2013. The launch generates unprecedented demand, with pre-release downloads breaking broadband traffic records across major UK networks.
  - In what is reported to be the first UK trial of its kind, four men are convicted of sexually abusing a woman whose husband drugged and secretly advertised her for sex online.
  - The UK government sets out its timeline for scrapping the majority of leaseholds in England and Wales, with 2031 as the target date for a ban on the sale of new leases.
- 20 November
  - The UK agrees a deal with the EU covering food exports, emissions trading and a youth experience scheme, which HM Treasury forecasts could add £17bn to the UK economy each year.
  - Anti-migrant activist Danny Tommo is sentenced to 15 months imprisonment for slashing a dinghy in the English Channel while a French rescue worker was still on board.
  - 2026 European refrigerator hacks: BBC News reports that a behind-the-scenes operation has taken place to secure commercial fridges and freezers from cyberattacks.
- 21 November – Villagers in Barnham, Suffolk hold a symbolic referendum in which they vote overwhelmingly to leave the UK in protest at plans to house asylum seekers at a nearby airbase.
- 22 November – Chris O'Shea, the director of British Gas owner Centrica, says he is "hugely concerned" about the impact on customers of the expected increase in energy bills in January 2027.

=== Predicted and scheduled events ===
- 11 December – Tyson Fury and Anthony Joshua are set to contest the all-British boxing heavyweight title at Cardiff's Principality Stadium.

== Publications ==
- 18 June – The End of Everything by M. John Harrison.
- 10 September – Gruffalo Granny by Julia Donaldson.
- 22 September – Swan Song: Diana, My Sister by Earl Spencer.

== Births ==
- 3 August – Adelaide Elizabeth Annina Brooksbank.

== See also ==
- Politics of the United Kingdom
- 2020s in United Kingdom political history
- 2026 deaths in the United Kingdom
- 2026 United Kingdom electoral calendar
- 2026 in United Kingdom politics and government
- 2026 in British music
- 2026 in British television
- 2026 in British radio
- List of British films of 2026
