= ACDC =

ACDC may refer to:

- AC/DC, an Australian rock music group
- ACDC (medicine), Arterial calcification due to deficiency of CD73 (ACDC), a rare genetic disorder
- Adiponectin, a peptide hormone
- All Campus Dining Center, a dining hall at Vassar College
- Asian Community Development Corporation, a community development organization headquartered in Boston
- ACDC (JoJo's Bizarre Adventure), also Esidisi, a character from the Japanese manga and anime JoJo's Bizarre Adventure in the story arc Battle Tendency
- ACDC, a dance crew led by Adam G. Sevani and Jon M. Chu
- Africa CDC, Africa Centres for Disease Control and Prevention
- Asymmetric counteranion directed catalysis, a type of chemical reaction

== See also ==
- AC/DC (disambiguation)
- ACDC domain, AP2-Coincident Domain mainly at the Carboxy-terminus, a protein domain found in malaria parasites and its evolutionary relatives
- ACDC Lane, a street in Melbourne named after the band AC/DC
- ACDSee, a shareware image viewer program
- Alternating current (AC) electricity
- Direct current (DC) electricity
