= ACCT =

ACCT may refer to:

- Academy of Canadian Cinema & Television
- African College of Commerce and Technology, a private tertiary educational institution in Uganda
- Agence de Coopération Culturelle et Technique, the precursor to what is now the Organisation internationale de la Francophonie
- Association for Challenge Course Technology, an organization that publishes voluntary standards for adventure activities such as zip-lining in the U.S.
- Association of Community College Trustees, a non-profit educational organization
- Acct (protocol), a computer network protocol

== See also ==
- Account (disambiguation) or accounting
