= Jean Kaseya =

Congolese medical doctor

Dr. Jean Kaseya
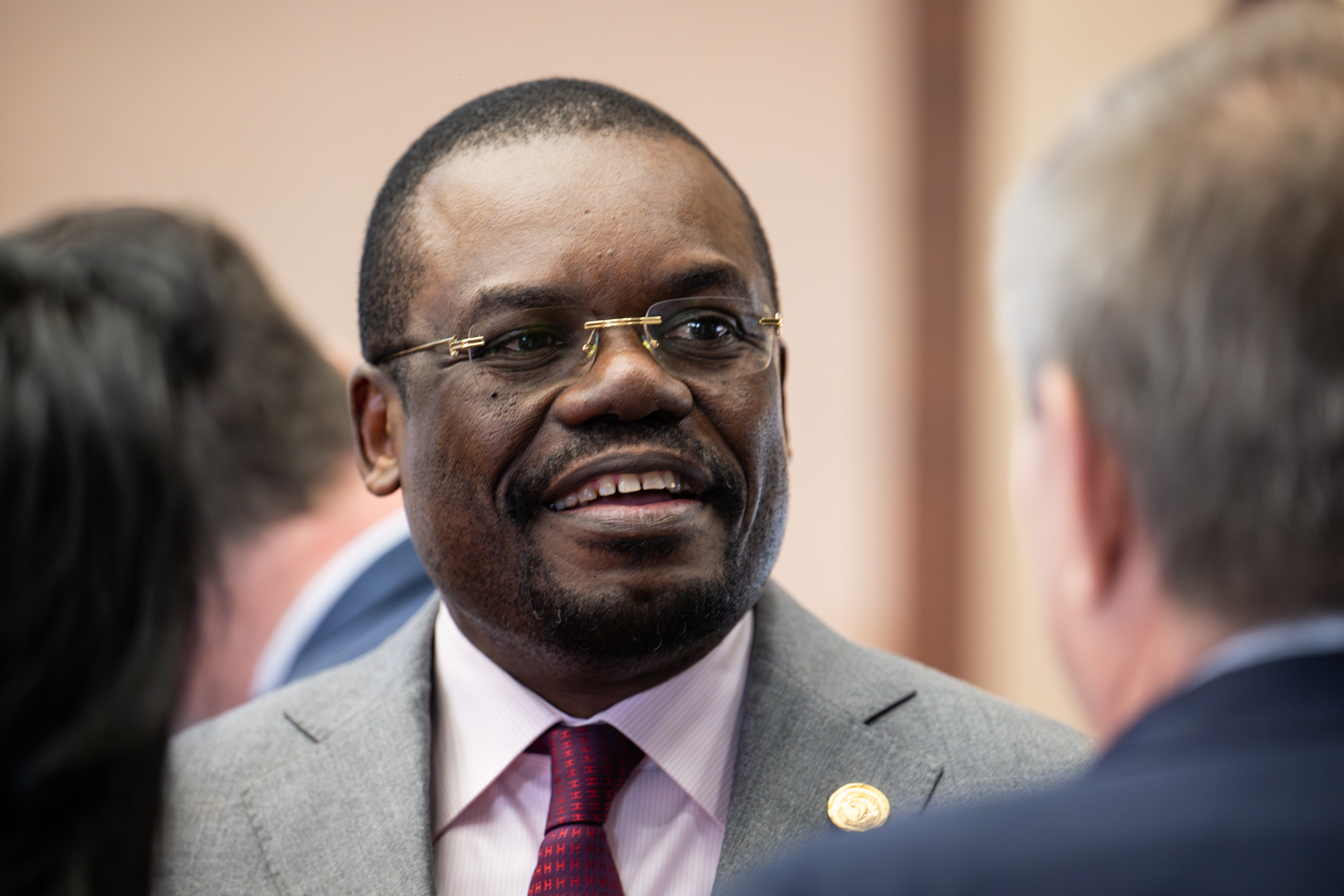

Director General at Africa CDC
- Incumbent
- Assumed office April, 2023
- Preceded by: John Nkengasong

Personal details
- Born: 1970 (age 55–56) Kinshasa, DRC
- Education: University of Kinshasa (MD); Henri Poincaré University (MPH)
- Profession: Medical Doctor
- Portfolio: Public health

Jean Kaseya (born 1970), is a Congolese medical doctor and public health executive, who serves as the Director General at Africa Centres for Disease Control and Prevention (Africa CDC), the African public health agency, based in Addis Ababa, Ethiopia, since April 2023.

Kaseya holds a medical degree from the University of Kinshasa and a master's degree in public health from Henri Poincaré University, France. Since 1997, Kaseya has served Africa's public health through local and international organizations. Starting within the DRC Ministry of Health, Kaseya was raised to the position of technical coordinator for the WHO Meningitis Vaccine Project based in Geneva in 2008. Between 2009 and 2011, he was a Senior Director of Programs at GAVI, the Vaccine Alliance, based in Geneva, Switzerland. Subsequently, he joined UNICEF in Africa where he held senior positions for 9 years in Ivory Coast, Congo Brazzaville, and Namibia, at various times. Prior to his election for Africa-CDC, Kaseya was the Head of the African Health Diagnostics Platform (AHDP/EIB) Global Team and Country Director for DRC at Clinton Health Access Initiative (CHAI), since November 2020.

Kaseya's leadership of Africa CDC has continued to attract controversy. In August 2023, Devex reported allegations by anonymous group of staff members accussing him of intimidation, threats, and maltreatment of employees and partners. Subsequently Devex reported in May 2024 about an internal audit that identified concerns regarding procurement procedures, contract awards and recruitment practices. In 2026his decision to recall three Africa CDC regional Directors to headquarters triggered an admnistrative dispute with the directors challenging the decision through AU tribunal.

== Biography ==
Kaseya was born in 1970, he grew up and completed his elementary and secondary education in Democratic Republic of the Congo (DRC). In 1990, Kaseya attended the University of Kinshasa in DRC, he graduated with a Doctor of Medicine (MD) degree in 1997. In 2005, Kaseya enrolled at Henri Poincaré University in France to pursue a postgraduate degree, and he earned a master's degree in public health there in 2006.

== Career ==
In 1997, after graduating from University of Kinshasa, Kaseya started working under the DRC Ministry of Health as a general practitioner at the Kinshasa General Hospital for a year. Subsequently, he became medical director at the Kahemba General Hospital in DRC until December 1999. In 2000, Kaseya worked as a chief in the DRC Ministry of Health responsible for Routine Immunization. In addition, he served as senior health advisor to the former president of the DRC, Laurent-Désiré Kabila for a year, until 2001.

From 2001 to 2008, Kaseya served as a senior team leader for USAID projects in the DRC (Sanru III and AXxes). Sanru was an initiative in the DRC to Fight AIDS, Tuberculosis, and Malaria, often referred to as the Global Fund. He served as its country representative in DRC between 2006 and 2008.

In 2008, Kaseya moved to Geneva, Switzerland where he was appointed the technical coordinator for the WHO Meningitis Vaccine Project, until 2009. In this role, he led the development of the Meningitis A Investment Project (worth $571 million) to support the introduction of the new MenAfriVac vaccine in Africa, to eradicate Meningitis A as a major public health problem. Subsequently, he was appointed as Senior Director of Programs at GAVI, the Vaccine Alliance, based in Geneva, Switzerland. He was also responsible for Gavi programs for African countries including activities related to measles, yellow fever, and meningitis, until 2011.

Since 2011, Kaseya held various positions at UNICEF for 9 years, including Senior Health Emergencies Manager in Abidjan, Côte d'Ivoire, Chief of Child Survival and Development in Congo Brazzaville and Namibia, at various times. From June 2020 to February 2021, Kaseya served as the team leader of a charity coalition of African partners for Global Polio Eradication Initiative. He liaised with African governments and partners including WHO, UNICEF, BMGF, IFRC, Rotary, CDC and Gavi, to ensure the effectiveness, quality and timeliness of Emergency Operations Centers in Africa.

Since November 2020, Kaseya has also been the Head of the African Health Diagnostics Platform (AHDP/EIB) Global Team and Country Director for DRC at Clinton Health Access Initiative (CHAI), the position he left when he was elected as Director General at Africa Centres for Disease Control and Prevention (Africa-CDC) in February 2023, the first Director General of Africa CDC elected by African Heads of State.

== Other activities ==
During the 2024 African Union Summit, the Heads of State and Governments recognized the need to establish the pooled procurement mechanism under the leadership of Africa CDC and endorsed the Africa Medical Supplies Platform (AMSP) as the platform for the mechanism. Since then, led by Director-General Kaseya, Africa CDC has developed the African Pooled Procurement Mechanism (APPM) to improve access to quality and affordable health product technologies and promote local manufacturing to create a favorable environment for vaccine manufacturing. The policy aligns with the African ambition of manufacturing at least 60% of the total vaccine doses required on the continent by 2040.
