= NmVac4-A/C/Y/W-135 =

Vaccine against bacterial meningitis

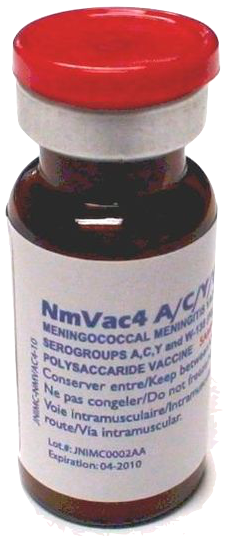

Vaccine description
- Target: Neisseria meningitidis serotypes A, C, Y, W-135
- Vaccine type: Polysaccharide

Clinical data
- Routes of administration: Intramuscular (IM)
- ATC code: J07AH04 (WHO)

Identifiers
- ChemSpider: none

NmVac4-A/C/Y/W-135 is the commercial name for a polysaccharide vaccine that protects against meningococcal meningitis caused by Neisseria meningitidis, specifically the serotypes A, C, Y, and W-135. This vaccine is part of a broader group of meningococcal vaccines. It is especially formulated for use in developing countries, aimed at protecting populations during meningitis outbreaks, particularly in high-risk regions like the African meningitis belt.

Meningococcal meningitis is a bacterial infection caused by the Neisseria meningitidis bacterium, commonly known as meningococcus. The vaccine is created using bacterial capsular polysaccharides derived from each of the targeted serogroups through fermentation processes in bioreactors. Following fermentation, the polysaccharides are purified, stabilized, and lyophilized with preservatives to create the final vaccine product.

While effective against serogroups A, C, Y, and W-135, the vaccine does not provide protection against other meningococcal serogroups and does not eliminate the risk of infection by these other groups.

== Medical uses ==
=== Initial vaccination of children ===
Children two to ten years of age who are at high risk for meningococcal disease, especially those with certain chronic medical conditions and those who travel to or reside in countries with hyper-endemic or epidemic meningococcal disease. Although safety and efficacy of the vaccine have not been established in children younger than two years of age and under outbreak control, the unconjugated vaccine can be considered. Safety and efficacy of NmVac4 have not been established in children younger than 11 years of age; however, clinical studies in children 2–10 years of age have been recommended.

=== Adolescents 11 years of age or older ===
It is recommended that primary immunization against meningococcal disease with NmVac4 for all young adolescents at 11–12 years of age and all unvaccinated older adolescents at 15 years of age. Although NmVac4 is the preferred meningococcal vaccine in adolescents 11 years of age or older, NmVac4 is an acceptable alternative if the conjugated vaccine is unavailable.

=== Adults ===
College students who plan to live in dormitories receive primary immunization with NmVac4. Although the risk for meningococcal disease for is similar to 18–24 years of age that for the general population of similar age. The college students consider vaccination against meningococcal disease to reduce their risk for the disease and stated that college health-care providers should take a proactive role in providing information about meningococcal disease to students and their parents. Although NmVac4 is the preferred meningococcal vaccine in adults 55 years of age or younger, NmVac4 is an acceptable alternative for adults in this age group if the conjugated vaccine is unavailable. Since safety and efficacy of NmVac4 in adults older than 55 years of age have not been established to date, NmVac4 should be used for primary immunization in this group.

=== Medical staff and laboratory personnel ===
Health care workers and laboratory personnel who are routinely exposed to isolates of N. meningitidis are recommended to receive routine immunization against meningococcal disease. Laboratory personnel and medical staff are at increased risk of exposure to N. meningitidis or to people with meningococcal disease. Hospital Infection Control Practices Advisory Committee (HICPAC) recommendations regarding immunization of health-care workers state that routine vaccination of health-care personnel is recommended. Any individual 11–55 years of age who wishes to reduce their risk of meningococcal disease may receive NmVac4 as can those older than 55 years of age. Under certain circumstances if unvaccinated health-care personnel cannot get vaccinated and who have intensive contact with oropharyngeal secretions of infected patients and who do not use proper precautions should receive anti-infective prophylaxis against meningococcal infection (i.e., 2-day regimen of oral rifampin or a single dose of intramuscular ceftriaxone or a single dose of oral ciprofloxacin).

=== Military recruits ===
Because the risk of meningococcal disease is increased among military recruits, all military recruits routinely receive primary immunization against the disease.

=== Travelers ===
Only Saudi Arabia requires that travelers to their country for the annual Hajj and Umrah pilgrimage have a certificate of vaccination against meningococcal disease issued not more than 3 years and not less than 10 days before arrival in Saudi Arabia. Travelers to or residents of areas where N. meningitidis is highly endemic or epidemic are at risk of exposure should receive primary immunization against meningococcal disease. Peaks of meningococcal disease (usually caused by serogroup A or C) occur regularly during the dry season (i.e., December through June) in that portion of sub-Saharan Africa known as the " meningitis belt," which extends from Mali to Ethiopia. In addition, major epidemics occur every 8–12 years. Travelers to these high-risk areas may be at risk of meningococcal disease and many of these countries do not have established means for surveillance and timely reporting of epidemics The vaccine (containing serogroups A, C, Y, and W-135) is currently required by Saudi Arabia for pilgrims visiting Mecca for the Hajj or for the Umrah.

=== HIV-infected individuals ===
HIV-infected individuals are likely to be at increased risk for meningococcal disease; HIV-infected individuals who wish to reduce their risk of meningococcal disease may receive primary immunization against meningococcal disease. Although efficacy of NmVac4 has not been evaluated in HIV-infected individuals to date, HIV-infected individuals 11–55 years of age may receive primary immunization with the conjugated vaccine. Vaccination against meningococcus does not decrease CD4^{+} T cell counts or increase viral load in HIV-infected individuals and there has been no evidence that the vaccines adversely affect survival.

=== Close contacts of invasive meningococcal disease ===
Protective levels of anticapsular antibodies are not achieved until 7–14 days following administration of a meningococcal vaccine, vaccination cannot prevent early onset disease in these contacts and usually is not recommended following sporadic cases of invasive meningococcal disease.

=== Disease outbreak control ===
NMVAC-4 can be used for large-scale vaccination programs when an outbreak of meningococcal disease occurs in Africa and other regions of the world. Whenever sporadic or cluster cases or outbreaks of meningococcal disease occur in the US, chemoprophylaxis is the principal means of preventing secondary cases in household and other close contacts of individuals with invasive disease. NMVAC-4 rarely may be used as an adjunct to chemoprophylaxis, but only in situations where there is an ongoing risk of exposure (e.g., when cluster cases or outbreaks occur) and when a serogroup contained in the vaccine is involved. It is important that clinicians promptly report all cases of suspected or confirmed meningococcal disease to local public health authorities and that the serogroup of the meningococcal strain involved be identified. The effectiveness of mass vaccination programs depends on early and accurate recognition of outbreaks. When a suspected outbreak of meningococcal disease occurs, public health authorities will then determine whether mass vaccinations (with or without mass chemoprophylaxis) is indicated and delineate the target population to be vaccinated based on risk assessment.

=== Other ===
Inherited properdin deficiency also is related with an increased risk of contracting meningococcal disease. People with a functional or anatomic lack of spleen function may not efficiently clear encapsulated Neisseria meningitidis from the bloodstream and are at increased risk of infection. Persons with other conditions associated with immunosuppression also may be at increased risk of developing meningitis disease.

People with component deficiencies in the final common complement pathway (C3, C5–C9) are more susceptible to N. meningitidis infection than complement-satisfactory people, and it was estimated that the risk of infection is 7,000 times higher in such individuals. In addition, complement component-deficient population frequently experience frequent meningococcal disease, since their immune response to natural infection may be less complete than that of complement none-deficient people.

== Contraindications ==
The safety of the vaccine in pregnant women has not been established. The safety of this vaccine in the people with chronic medical conditions has not been established.

== Pharmacodynamics ==
=== Formulation ===
The vaccine contains 50 mcg of purified polysaccharide for each of the serogroups (A, C, Y, and W135) in a lyophilized form. The active pharmaceutical ingredient of the C, Y, and W-135 serogroups is sialic acid. Phosphate is an API for serogroup A. Lactose is used as a stabilizer. As a precautionary measure, mercury is not used in the vaccine formulation. The vaccine comes in 10 and 50-dose vials and is reconstituted using saline diluent.

Structures of the capsular polysaccharides of N. meningitidis A, C, Y, and W-135:

Group	Structure of repeating unit (Fig. 1- Fig. 4)
A	→6)α-D-ManNAc(1-PO4→ 3 ↑ OAc
C	→9)α-D-NeuNAc(2→ 7/8 ↑ OAc
Y	→6)α-D-Glc (l→4) α-D-NeuNAc (2→ (OAc)
W135	→6)α-D-Gal (l→4) α-D-NeuNAc (2→

NMR analysis showed that the structures of the Polysaccharides of N. meningitidis A.C.Y and W-135 isolates collected from Africa and used in the vaccine production are O-acetylation positive (O Ac +) and it is one of the requirement of International Conference on Harmonization ICH and WHO Guidance. O-acetylated polysaccharides influence the immunogenicity of meningococcal vaccines. It is well known that O acetylated at carbon 3 in serogroup A polysaccharide induces higher Serum Bactericidal Antibody (SBA) detectable anti- serogroup A antibodies in human. Serogroups C, W-135, and Y also have various degrees of O-acetylation, whereas, none O-acetylated of these serogroups can also produce protective immunogenicity against the disease. WHO/ICH requirement of O-acetylation positive for serogroups C, W-135, and Y is disadvantage for the vaccine manufacturers in the selection of high yielding polysaccharide producing O-acetylation groups.

=== Chemical structures of polysaccharides vaccines ===
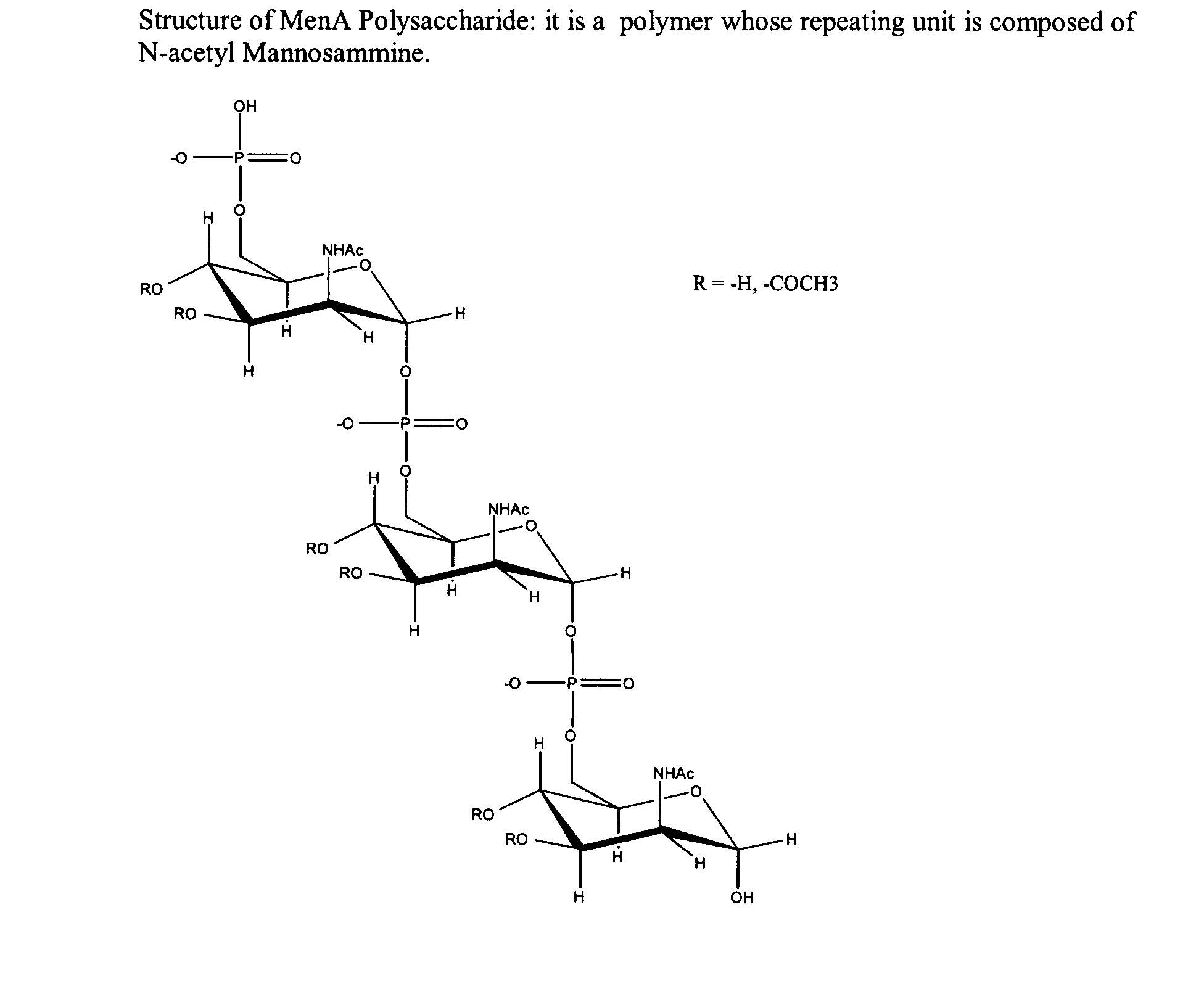
Fig.1 N. meningitidis group A

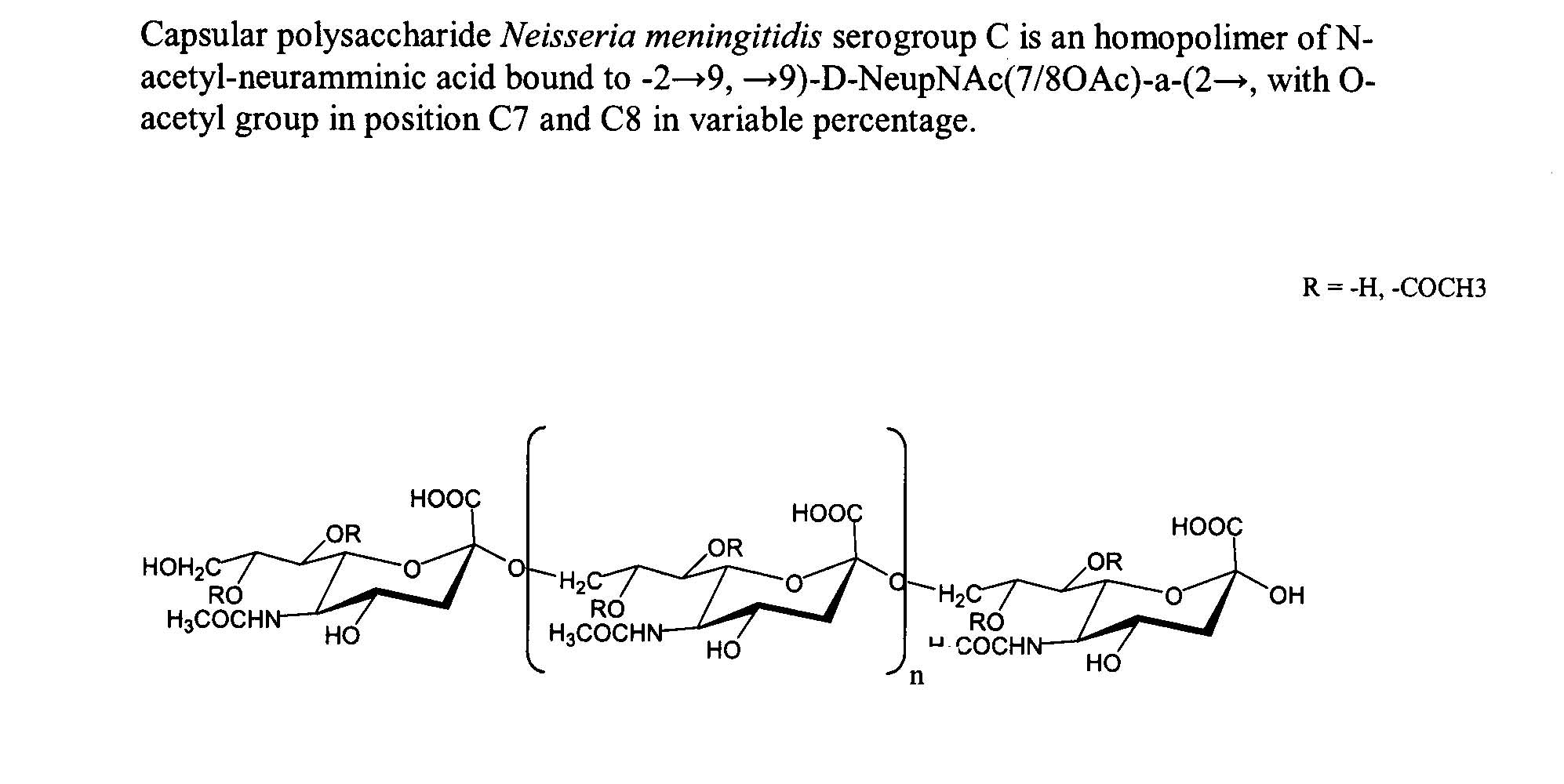
Fig.2 N. meningitidis group C

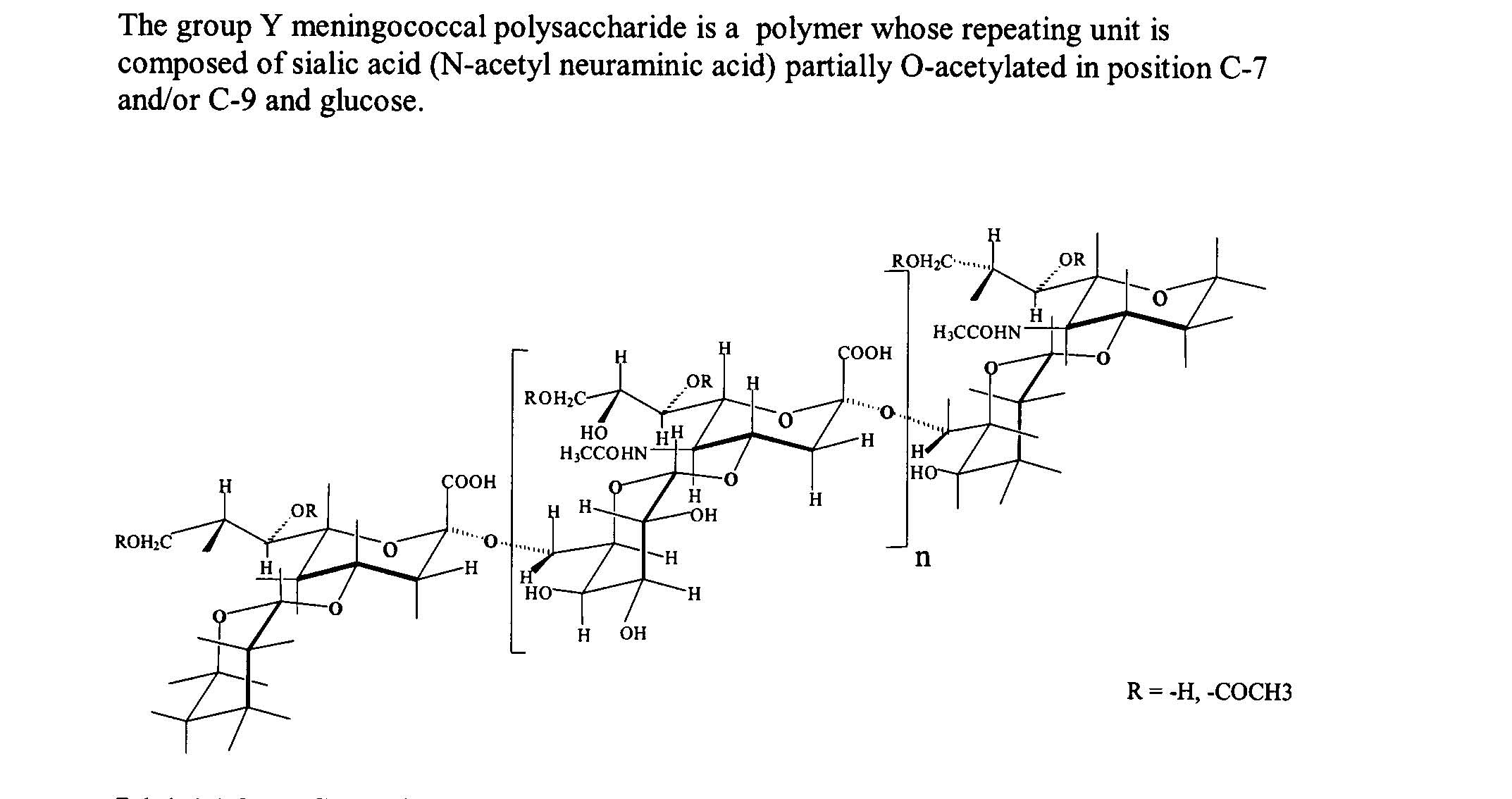
Fig.3 N. meningitidis group Y

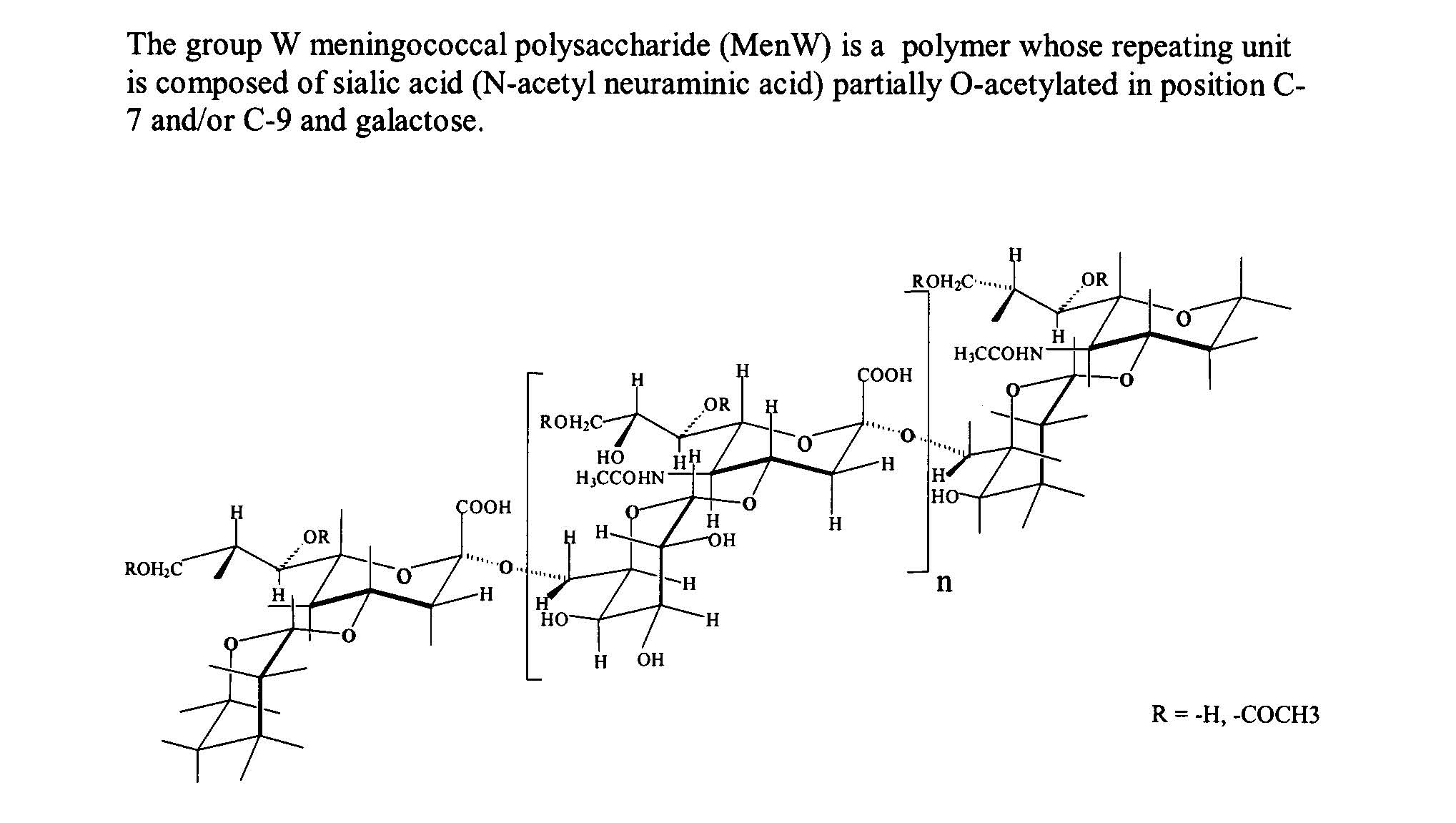
Fig.4 N. meningitidis group W-135

== Notes ==
- Product Brochure
- Vaccine Clinical Trials multimedia presentation of clinical trial within the Meningitis Belt of sub-Saharan Africa.
- http://www.jn-vaccines.org/NmVac4.pdf
