= AC/DC (disambiguation) =

AC/DC are an Australian hard rock band named after the two types of electrical mains power.

AC/DC may also refer to:

== Electronics ==
- AC/DC converter, or rectifier, a device that converts AC to DC
- Universal motor or AC/DC motor, a type of electric motor that runs on AC or DC
- AC/DC receiver, broadcast receivers from the early days of radio and television that ran from AC or DC mains
- AC/DC supply, power supply
- The historical commercial Battle of Currents between distributors of AC or DC as mains power
- Power inverter, a device that converts DC to AC

== Music ==
- AC/DC (video), by the Australian band AC/DC, 1989
- AC×DC, American hardcore punk band
- ACDC, a dance crew led by Adam G. Sevani and Jon M. Chu
- "AC/DC", a song from the musical Starlight Express
- "AC-DC", a song from the Sweet album Sweet Fanny Adams

== Other uses ==
- AC/DC (pinball), a pinball machine designed after the band AC/DC
- "AC/DC" (Brooklyn Nine-Nine), a television episode
- AC/DC (slang), a slang term for bisexuality

== See also ==
- ACDSee, a shareware image viewer program
- AC/DShe, an all-female AC/DC tribute band from San Francisco
- ACDC (disambiguation)
- AC (disambiguation)
- DC (disambiguation)
- Alternating current (AC)
- Direct current (DC)
