= AC =

AC, A.C., A/C, or Ac most often refers to:

- An account that holds or records money, often abbreviated as a/c
- Air conditioning, often abbreviated as A/C
- Alternating current, a type of electrical current in which the current repeatedly changes direction

AC, A.C., A/C, or Ac may also refer to:

== Arts and entertainment ==
=== Gaming ===
- Ace Combat, a series of combat flight simulator games
- Animal Crossing, a series of community simulation games
- Anonymous;Code, a visual novel in the Science Adventure series
- Another Code, a series of adventure games
- Armored Core, a series of mecha-based third person shooter games
- Asheron's Call, a fantasy massively multiplayer online role-playing game
- Assassin's Creed, a series of action-adventure games
- Assetto Corsa, a racing simulator game
- Astral Chain, an action-adventure hack and slash game
- Armor class, a common property in role playing games used to determine the amount of armor a character has
- A.C., a character in Fortnite: Save the World

=== Music ===
- A. C. Newman, solo stage name for Canadian musician Carl Newman
- AC/DC, an Australian rock band formed in Sydney in 1973
- Adult contemporary music, a genre description used mainly in radio broadcasting
- Adult Contemporary (chart)
- Anal Cunt, an American musical group

=== Other media ===
- AC Comics, a comic book publisher established in 1969
- A.C. Slater, a fictional character in the American sitcom Saved by the Bell
- After Colony, an alternate timeline in the Gundam metaseries for the universe of Gundam Wing
- AC, the name of the "ultimate computer" in Isaac Asimov's novel The Last Question
- Asianovela Channel, a defunct Filipino TV channel

== Organizations ==
=== Businesses ===
- AC Cars, a British specialist automobile manufacturer
- AC Spark Plug, Delco, AC-Delco, and ACDelco, automotive parts brands owned by General Motors
- AC Hotels, a hotel chain owned by Marriott International
- AC Restaurants, a hotel and restaurant chain in the Benelux
- Air Canada, the flag carrier and largest airline of Canada (IATA code AC)
- Allis-Chalmers, a former industrial conglomerate
- Anderson, Clayton and Company, former American cotton trading firm
- Associated Content, an online publisher and distributor of original content
- Ayala Corporation, a holding company (Philippine Stock Exchange symbol AC)

=== Politics ===
- Action Congress of Nigeria, a political party
- Advisory Council on Youth, a non-governmental decision-making body in the Council of Europe
- Alternative for Change (Alternativa por el Cambio), a political party in Nicaragua
- Coast Alliance (Alianza Costeña), a former regional political coalition in Nicaragua

=== Other organizations ===
- AC – The Danish Confederation of Professional Associations, an umbrella organisation for several Danish trade unions
- AC Transit, a regional public transit agency in the San Francisco Bay Area
- Ad Council Japan (AC Japan), an organization that distributes Japanese public service announcements
- Civic Alliance Foundation (Alianţa Civică), a Romanian non-governmental organization
- Anthrocon, a furry convention held in Pittsburgh, Pennsylvania, US
- Aryan Circle, a white supremacist, Neo-Nazi prison gang spread throughout many U.S. correctional facilities
- Athletics Canada, the governing body of athletics in Canada
- Atlantic College, an international IB Diploma Programme residential Sixth Form College in the Vale of Glamorgan in Wales
- Audit Commission (Hong Kong), a government department in Hong Kong Special Administrative Region

== People ==
- AC Bonifacio (born 2002), a Philippine-Canadian actress, singer and dancer
- A. C. Green (born 1963), retired professional basketball player
- A. C. Grayling (born 1949), British philosopher
- Al Cowlings (born 1947), retired American football player
- Andreas Christensen (born 1996), Danish footballer

== Places ==
- .ac, Internet top-level domain name for Ascension Island
- Aachen, a spa town in North Rhine-Westphalia, Germany
- Acre (state), Brazil
- Aleksandrovac, Serbia (vehicle registration plate code AC)
- Ancol railway station, a railway station in Jakarta, Indonesia
- Antigua and Barbuda, obsolete two-letter FIPS and NATO codes
- Atlantic City, New Jersey, US

== Ranks, titles, and awards ==
- Aelod y Cynulliad, title for Members of the National Assembly for Wales
- Aircraftman, an air forces rank
- Ashoka Chakra (military decoration), India's highest peacetime military decoration
- Assistant Commissioner of Police of the Metropolis, a rank in London's Metropolitan Police
- Companion of the Order of Australia
- First assistant camera or Second assistant camera, in film-making
- Aviation Cadet, a military rank sometimes written as A/C

== Science and technology ==
=== Biology and medicine ===
- Acromioclavicular joint (AC joint), the shoulder junction between the scapula and the clavicle
- Adenylate cyclase, a lyase enzyme
- Adriamycin and cyclophosphamide, a chemotherapy regimen used to treat breast cancer
- Ante cibum (ac), Latin for "before meal", commonly seen in medical prescriptions
- Anterior commissure, a bundle of nerve fibers connecting the two temporal lobes of the brain
- Anterior cruciate ligament (AC ligament or ACL), a major ligament in the knee
- Appropriateness criteria, when it is appropriate to perform a medical procedure or service
- Assist control, a former term for continuous mandatory ventilation, a mode of mechanical ventilation
- Adenocarcinoma, a type of cancerous tumor
- Allergic conjunctivitis, inflammation of the conjunctiva

=== Chemistry ===
- Acetyl group, a functional group in chemistry
- Actinium, symbol Ac, a chemical element
- Hydrogen cyanide, AC in chemical weapons classification

=== Computing and telecommunications ===
- .ac, Internet top-level domain name for Ascension Island
- .ac (second-level domain), Internet second-level domain used to denote academic institutions in many countries
- AC (complexity), a hierarchy of complexity classes found in circuit complexity
- AC, initialism of access control
- Artificial consciousness, a field related to artificial intelligence and cognitive robotics
- Authorization certificate or attribute certificate, a digital permission to use a service or resource
- Arithmetic coding, a form of entropy encoding used in lossless data compression
- Alternating component a.k.a. AC coefficient in discrete cosine transform
- IEEE 802.11ac-2013, a wifi standard using 5 GHz, released in Dec 2013

=== Meteorology ===
- Altocumulus cloud, a medium-level cloud type
- Anticipated convection, convective outlooks issued by the U.S. National Weather Service

=== Other uses in science and technology ===
- Air conditioning, technologies for altering the temperature and humidity of air
- Across corners (A/C), a measure of external diameter of hexagonal nuts
- Alternating current, a type of electric current
  - AC power, a net transfer of energy over a complete cycle of the alternating current waveform
- Asphalt concrete, a type of road or path surfacing
- Average cost, in economics
- Axiom of choice, a mathematical concept in set theory
- Collier (AC), a US Navy hull classification symbol

== Sport ==
- AC Milan, an Italian football club based in the city of Milan
- Abkhazian Cup, football cup competition in Abkhazia
- Ards Circuit, motorsport racing circuit
- Athletics Canada, the governing body of athletics in Canada

== Other uses ==
- Ac (rune) (ᚪ), a rune of the Anglo-Saxon fuþorc and a continuation of the Elder Fuþark ansuz
- Acre, a unit of area with the symbol ac
- Advisory circular, a publication to provide guidance for compliance with airworthiness regulations
- After Christ, known as the Common Era (CE)
- Ante Christum or A.C., a Latin term meaning "before Christ"
- Antichrist, a Biblical prophecy about one who will oppose Jesus Christ and substitute himself in Christ's place
- Appeal Cases, or A.C., a UK law reporter covering decisions of the House of Lords, Supreme Court, Privy Council, and Court of Appeal
- Army Corps, an operational formation, sometimes known as a field corps, which consists of two or more divisions
- Auto Calesa, a war-time short-body version of the Philippine jeepney

== See also ==
- AC/DC (disambiguation)
