= Quadrivalent vaccine =

Quadrivalent vaccine, designed to protect against four different types of a disease, may refer to:

- Quadrivalent influenza vaccine
- Quadrivalent HPV vaccine
- Quadrivalent meningococcal vaccine
