= Air Conditioner (disambiguation) =

An air conditioner removes heat and moisture from the interior of an occupied space.

Air conditioner or air Conditioning may also refer to:

- Air Conditioning (album), a 1970 album by Curved Air
- Air Conditioner (film), a 2020 Angolan film

== See also ==
- AC (disambiguation)
