= Penbraya =

Pentavalent vaccine against meningococcal disease

Vaccine description
- Target: MenABCWY
- Vaccine type: Conjugate

Clinical data
- Trade names: Penbraya
- AHFS/Drugs.com: Monograph
- License data: US DailyMed: Penbraya
- ATC code: None

Legal status
- Legal status: US: ℞-only; EU: Rx-only

Identifiers
- PubChem SID: 497620849
- DrugBank: DB15681
- UNII: ZT89E5A103
- KEGG: D12436

Penbraya is a pentavalent conjugate vaccine developed by Pfizer for the prevention of invasive meningococcal disease in people 10 through 25 years of age. Invasive meningococcal disease, caused by the bacterium Neisseria meningitidis, can lead to serious conditions such as meningitis (inflammation of the brain and spinal cord lining) and sepsis. Penbraya is approved for use by the US Food and Drug Administration (FDA). Penbraya is the first pentavalent vaccine that provides coverage against the five most common serogroups causing meningococcal disease.

== Composition ==
Penbraya is a vaccine that combines components of two previously licensed meningococcal vaccines:

- Trumenba: A serogroup B meningococcal vaccine that targets outer membrane protein antigens (factor H binding proteins) of Neisseria meningitidis.
- Nimenrix: A quadrivalent conjugate vaccine that protects against Neisseria meningitidis serogroups A, C, W-135, and Y.

== Mechanism of action ==
Penbraya works by stimulating the body's immune system to produce antibodies that specifically target the Neisseria meningitidis bacteria. Antibodies against fHbp specifically block this protein's function, preventing the bacteria from evading immune defenses (serogroup B).

== Clinical Studies ==
Penbraya's efficacy was established through a randomized, active-controlled, observer-blinded multicenter phase III study that assessed Penbraya's immunogenicity. The trial compared Penbraya, administered at 0 and 6 months, with Trumenba, another meningococcal serogroup B vaccine, and MenACWY-CRM, a meningococcal conjugate vaccine. The primary measure of effectiveness was the increase in serum bactericidal activity using human complement (hSBA) against various strains of Neisseria meningitidis. The results demonstrated that Penbraya's seroresponse rates for serogroups A, C, W, and Y were non-inferior to those following a single dose of MenACWY-CRM. Moreover, the seroresponse to serogroup B primary strains among participants who received two doses of Penbraya was shown to be non-inferior to those following two doses of Trumenba.

== Society and culture ==
=== Legal status ===
In September 2024, the Committee for Medicinal Products for Human Use of the European Medicines Agency adopted a positive opinion, recommending the granting of a marketing authorization for the medicinal product Penbraya, intended for protection against invasive meningococcal disease caused by meningococcal bacteria of the serogroups A, B, C, W and Y. The applicant for this medicinal product is Pfizer Europe MA EEIG. Penbraya was authorized for medical use in the European Union in November 2024.
