= Meningococcal vaccine =

Vaccines used to prevent infection by Neisseria meningitidis

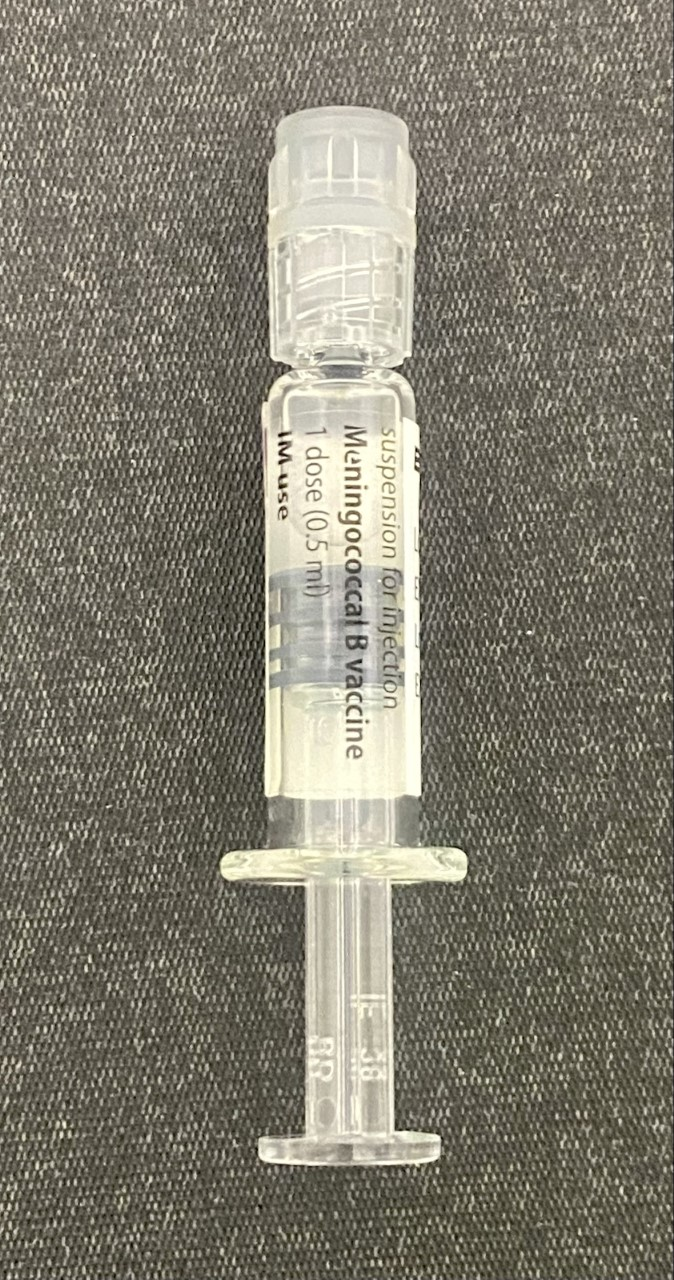

Vaccine description
- Target: Neisseria meningitidis
- Vaccine type: Conjugate or polysaccharide

Clinical data
- Trade names: Menomune, others
- AHFS/Drugs.com: Monograph
- MedlinePlus: a607020
- License data: US DailyMed: Meningococcal
- Pregnancy category: AU: B1
- Routes of administration: Conjugate: Intramuscular; Polysaccharide: Subcutaneous
- ATC code: J07AH01 (WHO) J07AH02 (WHO), J07AH03 (WHO), J07AH04 (WHO), J07AH05 (WHO), J07AH06 (WHO), J07AH07 (WHO), J07AH08 (WHO), J07AH09 (WHO)

Legal status
- Legal status: AU: S4 (Prescription only); CA: ℞-only / Schedule D; US: ℞-only; EU: Rx-only

Identifiers
- CAS Number: 1312204-49-1
- DrugBank: DB13888
- ChemSpider: none
- UNII: 9B7N7Y96MK; 9F8QQ6EER1
- KEGG: D10535; D04910

Meningococcal vaccine refers to any vaccine used to prevent infection by Neisseria meningitidis. Different versions are effective against some or all of the following types of meningococcus: A, B, C, W-135, and Y. The vaccines are between 85 and 100% effective for at least two years. They result in a decrease in meningitis and sepsis among populations where they are widely used. They are given either by injection into a muscle or just under the skin.

The World Health Organization recommends that countries with a moderate or high rate of disease or with frequent outbreaks should routinely vaccinate. In countries with a low risk of disease, they recommend that high-risk groups should be immunized. In the African meningitis belt efforts to immunize all people between the ages of one and thirty with the meningococcal A conjugate vaccine are ongoing. In Canada and the United States, vaccines against four types of meningococcus (A, C, W, and Y) are recommended routinely for teenagers and others who are at high risk. Saudi Arabia requires vaccination with the quadrivalent vaccine for international travellers to Mecca for Hajj.

Meningococcal vaccines are generally safe. Some people develop pain and redness at the injection site. Use in pregnancy appears to be safe. Severe allergic reactions occur in less than one in a million doses.

The first meningococcal vaccine became available in the 1970s. It is on the World Health Organization's List of Essential Medicines. Inspired by the response to the 1997 outbreak in Nigeria, the WHO, Médecins Sans Frontières, and other groups created the International Coordinating Group on Vaccine Provision for Epidemic Meningitis Control, which manages global response strategy. ICGs have since been created for other epidemic diseases.

== Types ==
Neisseria meningitidis has 13 clinically significant serogroups, classified according to the antigenic structure of their polysaccharide capsule. Six serogroups, A, B, C, Y, W-135, and X, are responsible for virtually all cases in humans. Serogroup B is a major cause of meningococcal disease in younger children and adolescents.

=== Pentavalent (serogroups A, B, C, W, and Y) ===
There are two pentavalent vaccines available in the United States targeting serogroups A, B, C, W, and Y:

- Penbraya was approved for use in the United States in October 2023. It combines the vaccines Trumenba and Nimenrix. Penbraya was authorized for medical use in the European Union in November 2024. It is approved for use in individuals 10 through 25 years of age.
- Penmenvy was approved for use in the United States in February 2025. Penmenvy is approved for use in people aged 10 through 25 years of age.

=== Pentavalent (serogroups A, C, W, X, and Y) (MenFive) ===
There is one pentavalent vaccine available targeting serogroups A, C, W, X, and Y:

- MenFive: Approved in several countries, and WHO prequalified. It is approved for use in individuals aged 9 months to 85 years against invasive meningococcal disease caused by Neisseria meningitidis groups A, C, Y, W, and X. It is a freeze-dried conjugate vaccine, recommended as a single intramuscular dose, and is available as 1-dose and 5-dose vials.

=== Quadrivalent (serogroups A, C, W-135, and Y) ===
There are three quadrivalent vaccines available in the United States targeting serogroups A, C, W-135, and Y:

- three conjugate vaccines (MCV-4), Menactra, Menveo, and Menquadfi. The pure polysaccharide vaccine Menomune, MPSV4, was discontinued in the United States in 2017.

Menveo and Menquadfi are approved for medical use in the European Union.

==== Menactra and Menveo ====
The first meningococcal conjugate vaccine (MCV-4), Menactra, was licensed in the US in 2005, by Sanofi Pasteur; Menveo was licensed in 2010, by Novartis. Both MCV-4 vaccines are approved by the Food and Drug Administration (FDA) for people 2 through 55 years of age. Menactra received FDA approval for use in children as young as 9 months in April 2011, while Menveo received FDA approval for use in children as young as two months in August 2013. The Centers for Disease Control and Prevention (CDC) has not made recommendations for or against its use in children less than two years. In November 2024, the European Commission (EC) approved Menveo to protect individuals aged two years and older against invasive meningococcal disease.

==== Menquadfi ====
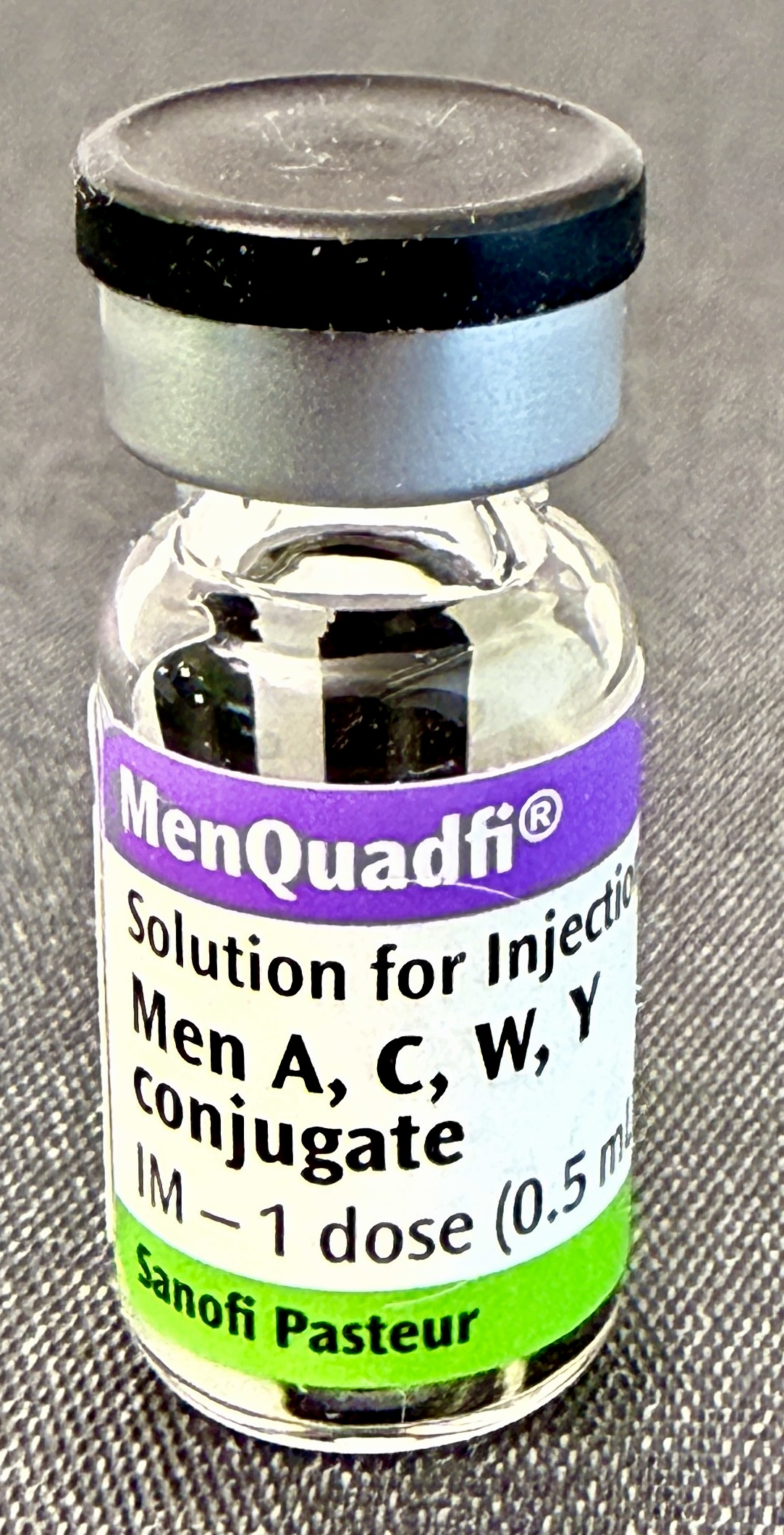
MenQuadfi solution for injection

Menquadfi, manufactured by Sanofi Pasteur, was approved by the US Food and Drug Administration in April 2020, for use in individuals two years of age and older.

==== Menomune ====
Meningococcal polysaccharide vaccine (MPSV-4), Menomune, has been available since the 1970s. It may be used if MCV-4 is not available, and is the only meningococcal vaccine licensed for people older than 55. Information about who should receive the meningococcal vaccine is available from the CDC.

==== Nimenrix ====
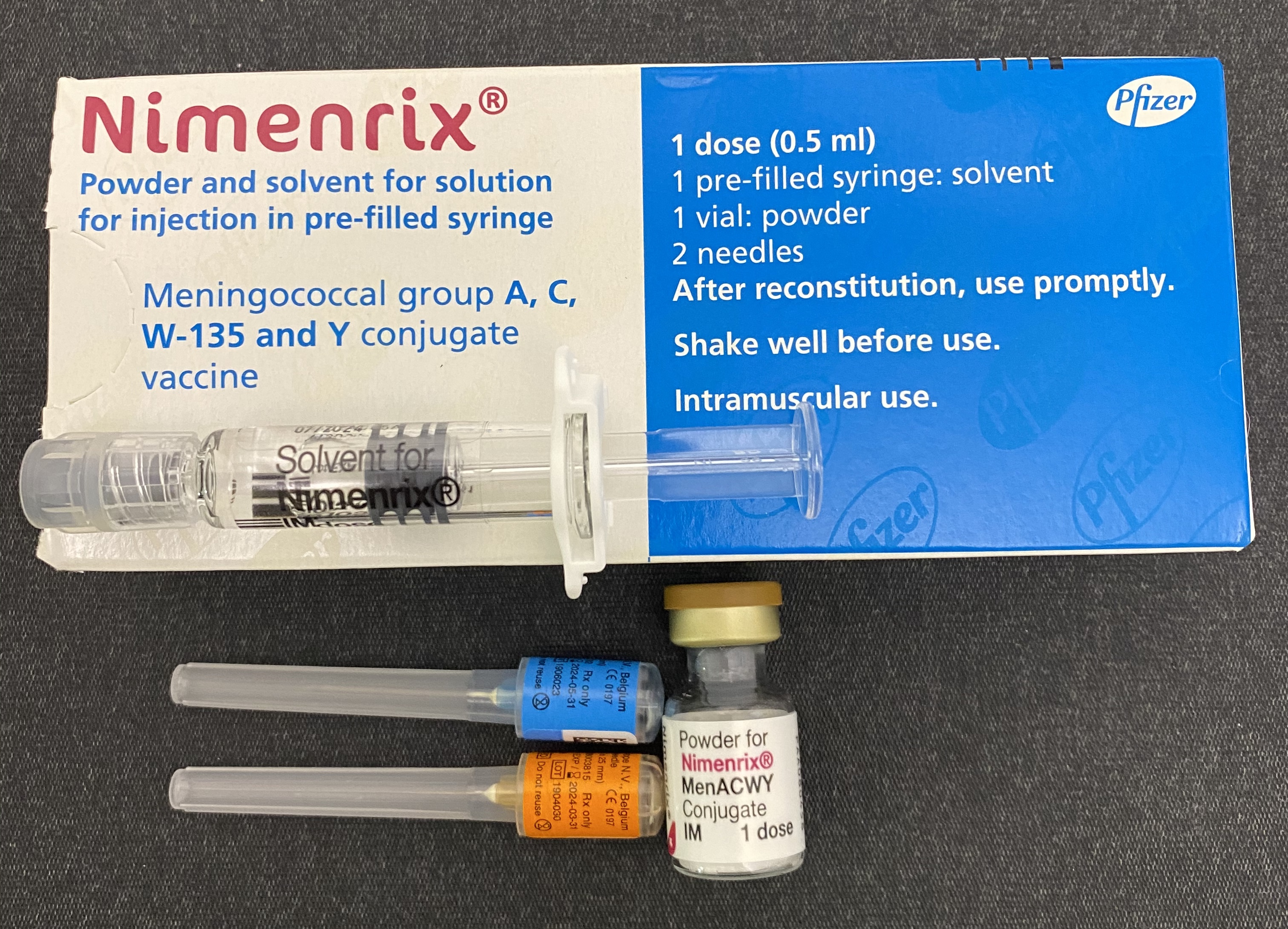
Nimenrix (Pfizer). Meningococcal group A, C, W-135, and Y conjugate vaccine

Nimenrix (developed by GlaxoSmithKline and later acquired by Pfizer), is a quadrivalent conjugate vaccine against serogroups A, C, W-135, and Y. In April 2012 Nimenrix was approved as the first quadrivalent vaccine against invasive meningococcal disease to be administered as a single dose in those over the age of one year, by the European Medicines Agency. In 2016, they approved the vaccine in infants six weeks of age and older, and it has been approved in other countries including Canada and Australia, among others. It is not licensed in the United States.

==== Mencevax ====
Mencevax (GlaxoSmithKline) and NmVac4-A/C/Y/W-135 (JN-International Medical Corporation) are used worldwide but have not been licensed in the United States.

==== Limitations ====
The duration of immunity mediated by Menomune (MPSV-4) is three years or less in children aged under five because it does not generate memory T cells. Attempting to overcome this problem by repeated immunization results in a diminished, not increased, antibody response, so boosters are not recommended with this vaccine. As with all polysaccharide vaccines, Menomune does not produce mucosal immunity, so people can still become colonised with virulent strains of meningococcus, and no herd immunity can develop. For this reason, Menomune is suitable for travellers requiring short-term protection, but not for national public health prevention programs.

Menveo and Menactra contain the same antigens as Menomune, but the antigens are conjugated to a diphtheria toxoid polysaccharide-protein complex, resulting in anticipated enhanced duration of protection, increased immunity with booster vaccinations, and effective herd immunity.

==== Endurance ====
A study published in March 2006, comparing the two kinds of vaccines found that 76% of subjects still had passive protection three years after receiving MCV-4 (63% protective compared with controls), but only 49% had passive protection after receiving MPSV-4 (31% protective compared with controls). As of 2010, there remains limited evidence that any of the current conjugate vaccines offer continued protection beyond three years; studies are ongoing to determine the actual duration of immunity, and the subsequent requirement of booster vaccinations. The CDC offers recommendations regarding who they feel should get booster vaccinations.

=== Bivalent (serogroups C and Y) ===
In June 2012, the FDA approved a combination vaccine against two types of meningococcal disease and Hib disease for infants and children 6 weeks to 18 months old. The vaccine, Menhibrix, prevents disease caused by Neisseria meningitidis serogroups C and Y and Haemophilus influenzae type b. This was the first meningococcal vaccine that could be given to infants as young as six weeks old. Menhibrix is indicated for active immunization to prevent invasive disease caused by Neisseria meningitidis serogroups C and Y and Haemophilus influenzae type b for children 6 weeks of age through 18 months of age.

=== Serogroup A ===
A vaccine called MenAfriVac has been developed through a program called the Meningitis Vaccine Project and has the potential to prevent outbreaks of group A meningitis, which is common in sub-Saharan Africa.

=== Serogroup B ===
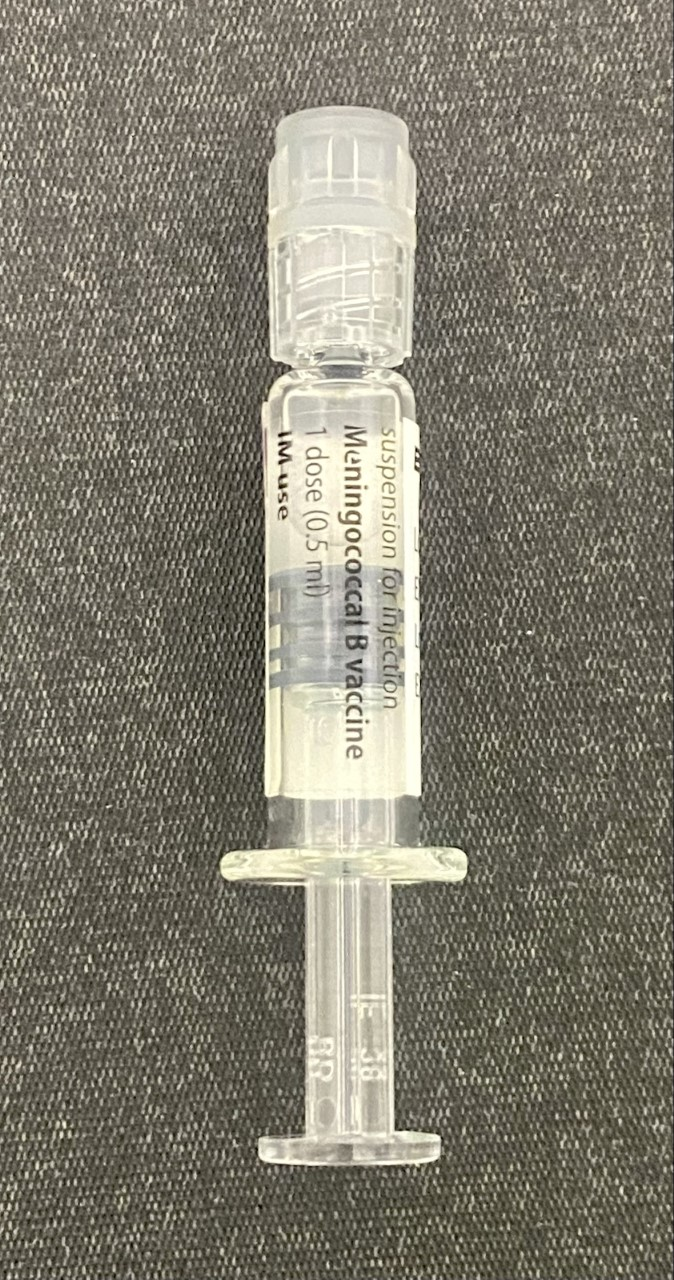
Meningococcal B vaccine

There are two licensed vaccines against serotype B meningococcal disease; BEXSERO (GSK) 4-component MenB vaccine (4CMenB) and Trumenba (Pfizer), a bivalent factor H binding protein vaccine (MenB-FHbp). In the UK, the MenB vaccine (BEXSERO) is given routinely as part of childhood vaccines as infants are at greatest risk from meningitis B. The protection offered is short (around 3 years). In the US, both vaccines are only approved for ages 10-25 and only given to certain risk groups.

=== Serogroup X ===
The occurrence of serogroup X has been reported in North America, Europe, Australia, and West Africa. Until recently, there was no vaccine to protect against serogroup X N. meningitidis disease.

However, a new pentavalent vaccine that protects against serogroups A, C, W, X and Y (MenFive; Serum Institute of India) has become available and has been recommended by the WHO in 2023 for use in endemic countries in Africa In 2024, Nigeria became the first country in the world to roll out the new vaccine

== Side effects ==
Common side effects include pain and redness around the site of injection (up to 50% of recipients). A small percentage of people develop a mild fever. A small proportion of people develop a severe allergic reaction. In 2016 Health Canada warned of an increased risk of anemia or hemolysis in people treated with eculizumab (Soliris). The highest risk was when individuals "received a dose of Soliris within 2 weeks after being vaccinated with Bexsero".

Despite initial concerns about Guillain-Barré syndrome, subsequent studies in 2012 have shown no increased risk of GBS after meningococcal conjugate vaccination.

== Travel requirements ==
Travellers need to show proof of meningococcal vaccination... Upon arrival in the Hajj and Umrah zones (foreign and domestic pilgrims, workers, and residents of Mecca and Medina) Before departure to Hajj and Umrah in Saudi Arabia, and to certain African countries Before departure to and upon arrival from Saudi Arabia Before departure to Hajj and Umrah in Saudi Arabia Upon arrival African meningitis belt: vaccination recommended for visitors

Travellers who wish to enter or leave certain countries or territories must be vaccinated against meningococcal meningitis, preferably 10–14 days before crossing the border, and be able to present a vaccination record/certificate at the border checks. Countries with required meningococcal vaccination for travellers include The Gambia, Indonesia, Lebanon, Libya, the Philippines and, most importantly and extensively, Saudi Arabia for Muslims visiting or working in Mecca during the Hajj or Umrah pilgrimages. For some countries in African meningitis belt, vaccinations prior to entry are not required, but highly recommended.

Meningococcal vaccination requirements for international travel
Country or territory	Details
The Gambia	All travellers must show proof of vaccination with the quadrivalent meningococcal vaccine (ACYW135) upon arrival.
Indonesia	Travellers arriving from or departing to Saudi Arabia must show proof of vaccination with quadrivalent ACYW-135.
Lebanon	Proof of vaccination with quadrivalent ACYW-135 is required for travellers departing Lebanon and going to Hajj, Umrah, and to certain African countries.
Libya	All travellers must show proof of vaccination with quadrivalent ACYW-135 upon arrival.
Philippines	Proof of vaccination with quadrivalent ACYW-135 is required for travellers going to Hajj and Umrah (in Saudi Arabia).
Saudi Arabia	Proof of vaccination is required for travellers two years of age and older who are Hajj or Umrah pilgrims and seasonal or pilgrim workers in Hajj and Umrah areas. Vaccination with quadrivalent ACYW135 (either polysaccharide or conjugate) must be issued not less than 10 days before arrival and not more than 3 years (polysaccharide vaccine) or 5 years (conjugate vaccine) before arrival. The immunisation certificate should clearly state if the traveller was vaccinated with the conjugate vaccine for the 5-year validity to apply.; Vaccination is also required for domestic pilgrims, residents of Mecca and Medina, and any persons participating in Hajj or Umrah or seasonal or pilgrimage work in Hajj and Umrah zones. At the discretion of the Ministry of Health, travellers may be administered prophylactic antibiotics upon arrival.
