= John Nkengasong =

Cameroonian-American virologist

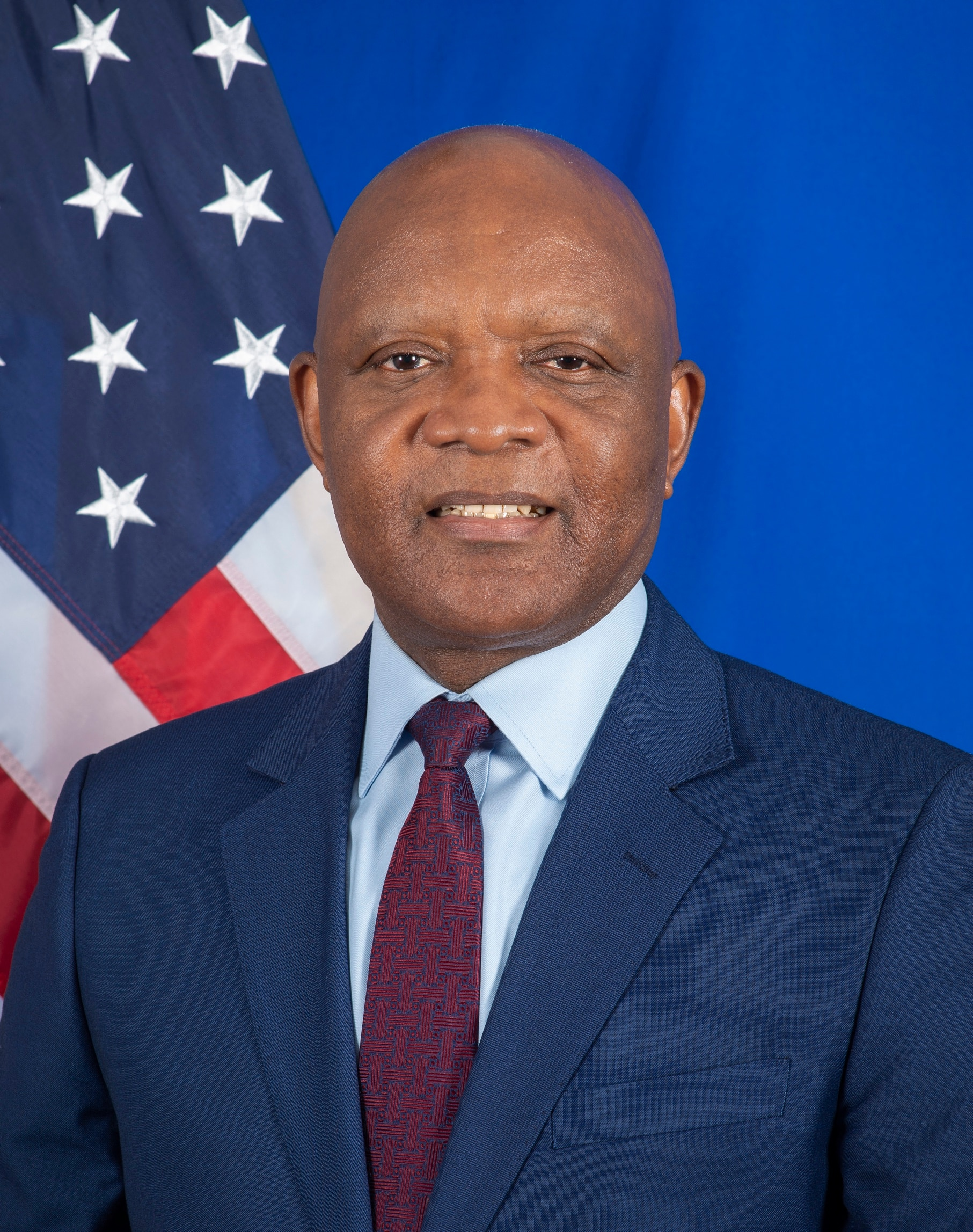

5th United States Global AIDS Coordinator United States Special Representative for Global Health Diplomacy
- In office June 13, 2022 – January 20, 2025
- President: Joe Biden
- Preceded by: Deborah Birx

1st Director of the Africa Centres for Disease Control and Prevention
- In office 2016 – May 2022
- Preceded by: Post established
- Succeeded by: Jean Kaseya

Personal details
- Born: Douala, Cameroon
- Education: University of Yaoundé I (BS); Institute of Tropical Medicine Antwerp (MS); Vrije Universiteit Brussel (MSc); Vrije Universiteit Brussel (PhD)

John N. Nkengasong is a Cameroonian-American virologist who served as the Global AIDS Coordinator in the Biden administration from 2022 to 2025 and Senior Bureau Official for Global Health Security and Diplomacy from 2023 to 2025. He previously worked as the Director of the Africa Centres for Disease Control and Prevention from 2016 to 2022, as well as at the World Health Organization (WHO) and Centers for Disease Control and Prevention. During the COVID-19 pandemic, Nkengasong was appointed the WHO Special Envoy for Africa.

== Early life and education ==
Nkengasong is from Cameroon. He became interested in biology, chemistry and mathematics whilst he was at high school.

Nkengasong earned his undergraduate degree at the University of Yaoundé I. During his undergraduate degree he met Peter Piot, who encouraged him to visit Antwerp as a graduate student in virology. He ended up studying biomedical sciences at the Institute of Tropical Medicine Antwerp. After completing his second degree, he moved to the Vrije Universiteit Brussel, where he earned a master's degree in medical sciences. After earning his master's degree, Nkengasong then joined the research group of Guido van der Groen and Piot, eventually earning a doctorate degree in medical sciences (virology) from Vrije Universiteit Brusse. His doctoral research was the first to characterize all of the genetic subtypes of HIV in Africa. He later completed a management qualification at the John F. Kennedy School of Government.

== Research and career ==
=== Early beginnings ===
In 1993, Nkengasong joined the World Health Organization, where he served as Chief of Virology. He was based in the Collaborating Centre for HIV/AIDS Diagnostics in the Institute of Tropical Medicine Antwerp. He has worked on the diagnosis, pathogenesis and drug resistance of HIV/AIDS.

=== US CDC, 1994–2016 ===
After a couple of years, Nkengasong moved to the United States Centers for Disease Control and Prevention where he worked as Chief of Virology in Abidjan. In preparation for this job he was trained in Berkeley as part of the John E. Fogarty International Center. Nkengasong worked alongside Mike Hendry, who was running the HIV diagnosis program at the California State Laboratory.

In 2011, Nkengasong helped to establish the African Society for Laboratory Medicine (ASLM). The ASLM looks to support African researchers in developing their laboratory medicine capabilities and ability to care for patients.

=== Africa CDC, 2016–2022 ===
In 2016, Nkengasong joined the Africa Centres for Disease Control and Prevention as its inaugural Director. At the Africa CDC, Nkengasong oversees the Regional Integrated Surveillance and Laboratory Networks (RISLNET) with a focus on empowering local leadership.

During the COVID-19 pandemic, Nkengasong was appointed a special envoy to the director general of the World Health Organization. In this capacity, he was responsible for amplifying the messages of the Director General as well as providing strategic advice on preparedness. Nkengasong led Africa's response to coronavirus disease, including training a team of young responders; the African Healthcare Volunteer Workforce. Protecting the African population from coronavirus disease is complicated by challenges such as difficulties in testing in regions affected by conflicts and issues with social distancing in urban slums.

In the preparations for the Global Health Summit hosted by the European Commission and the G20 in May 2021, Nkengasong co-chaired the event's High-Level Scientific Panel.

=== Biden administration ===
On September 27, 2021, President Joe Biden nominated Nkengasong to be the Ambassador-at-Large for Global Health Diplomacy and Global AIDS Coordinator in the Department of State. Nkengasong's initial nomination expired at the end of the year and was returned to President Biden on January 3, 2022.

President Biden resent his nomination the following day. The Senate Foreign Relations Committee held hearings on Nkengasong's nomination on March 15, 2022. The committee favorably reported his nomination on May 4, 2022. On May 5, 2022, the United States Senate confirmed his nomination by voice vote. He was sworn in on June 13, 2022.

On August 1, 2023, Secretary of State Antony Blinken chose Nkengasong to lead the newly formed Bureau of Global Health Security and Diplomacy (GHSD), focused on coordinating international responses to infectious diseases.

On 23 May 2024, Nkengasong was among the guests invited to the state dinner hosted by Biden in honor of President William Ruto at the White House.

== Other activities ==
- Centre for International Health Protection (ZIG), Robert Koch Institute (RKI), Member of the Scientific Advisory Board (since 2020)
- UNAIDS, Member of the Advisory Group (since 2020)
- African Coalition for Epidemic Research, Response and Training (ALERRT), Member of the International Scientific Advisory Board
- Coalition for Epidemic Preparedness Innovations (CEPI), Member of the Board
- International AIDS Vaccine Initiative (IAVI), Member of the Board of Directors
- Nuclear Threat Initiative (NTI), Member of the Bio Advisory Group

== Awards and honours ==
- US Secretary of Health and Human Services Award for Excellence in Public Health Protection Research
- National Order of the Republic of Côte d'Ivoire
- CDC Foundation William Watson Medal of Excellence
- Virchow Prize for Global Health 2022 under High Patronage of the President of the Federal Republic of Germany
- Nominated to 2021 Time 100 list of influential global figures by economist Ngozi Okonjo-Iweala

== Select publications ==
- Wiktor, Stefan Z; Ekpini, Ehounou; Karon, John M; Nkengasong, John; Maurice, Chantal; Severin, Sibailly T; Roels, Thierry H; Kouassi, Moise K; Lackritz, Eve M; Coulibaly, Issa-Malick; Greenberg, Alan E (1999). "Short-course oral zidovudine for prevention of mother-to-child transmission of HIV-1 in Abidjan, Côte d'Ivoire: a randomised trial". The Lancet. 353 (9155): 781–785. doi:10.1016/s0140-6736(98)10412-9. ISSN 0140-6736. PMID 10459958. S2CID 30241185.
- Parsons, Linda M.; Somoskövi, Ákos; Gutierrez, Cristina; Lee, Evan; Paramasivan, C. N.; Abimiku, Alash'le; Spector, Steven; Roscigno, Giorgio; Nkengasong, John (April 1, 2011). "Laboratory Diagnosis of Tuberculosis in Resource-Poor Countries: Challenges and Opportunities". Clinical Microbiology Reviews. 24 (2): 314–350. doi:10.1128/CMR.00059-10. ISSN 0893-8512. PMC 3122496. PMID 21482728.
- Janssens, Wouter; Buvé, Anne; Nkengasong, John N. (May 11, 1997). "The puzzle of HIV-1 subtypes in Africa". AIDS. 11 (6): 705–712. doi:10.1097/00002030-199706000-00002. ISSN 0269-9370. PMID 9143601. S2CID 2781038.
