= Meningitis Vaccine Project =

African vaccination program

The Meningitis Vaccine Project is an effort to eliminate meningitis epidemics in Sub-Saharan Africa by developing a new meningococcal vaccine. Most outbreaks of meningococcal disease in the region, also known as the meningitis belt, are caused by serotype A of Neisseria meningitidis ("meningitis A"). In June 2010, various sources announced that they had developed MenAfriVac, which is an inexpensive, safe, and highly effective vaccine that reduces rates of meningitis A infection.

The project marked the first time that medical research had developed a vaccine to combat a disease that is endemic to and only a problem for Africa.

The project began in 2001 when the Bill & Melinda Gates Foundation awarded the World Health Organization and the Program for Appropriate Technology in Health (PATH) a US $70 million seed grant to begin research.

== Background ==
The so-called meningitis belt, showing the distribution of meningococcal meningitis in Africa

In 2001, the Bill & Melinda Gates Foundation awarded the World Health Organization and the Program for Appropriate Technology in Health (PATH) a US$70 million seed grant to launch the Meningitis Vaccine Project.

== Implementation ==
The mission of the project is to eliminate meningococcal disease (colloquially referred to simply as meningitis) as a public health problem in sub-Saharan Africa through the development, testing, introduction, and widespread use of conjugate meningococcal vaccines. The project recently developed MenAfriVac, a low-cost conjugate A vaccine that is ready for widespread distribution to people between the ages of 1 and 29 in Burkina Faso, Mali, and Niger, three countries in the African meningitis belt with the highest rates of meningitis.

== Manufacture ==
By working with the Serum Institute of India Ltd. to manufacture the vaccine, the project was able to develop a vaccine that would be affordable to developing African countries, priced at less than $US.50 per dose. Unlike existing vaccines, MenAfriVac also provides immunity for a long period—10 to 15 years—and is safe for use in infants one year of age and older. Following successful trials, the vaccine was introduced in three African countries in 2010.

== See also ==
- African meningitis belt
- 2009–10 West African meningitis outbreak
- Meningococcal vaccine
