= Ahmed Ogwell =

Kenyan public health specialist

Ahmed E. Ogwell Ouma
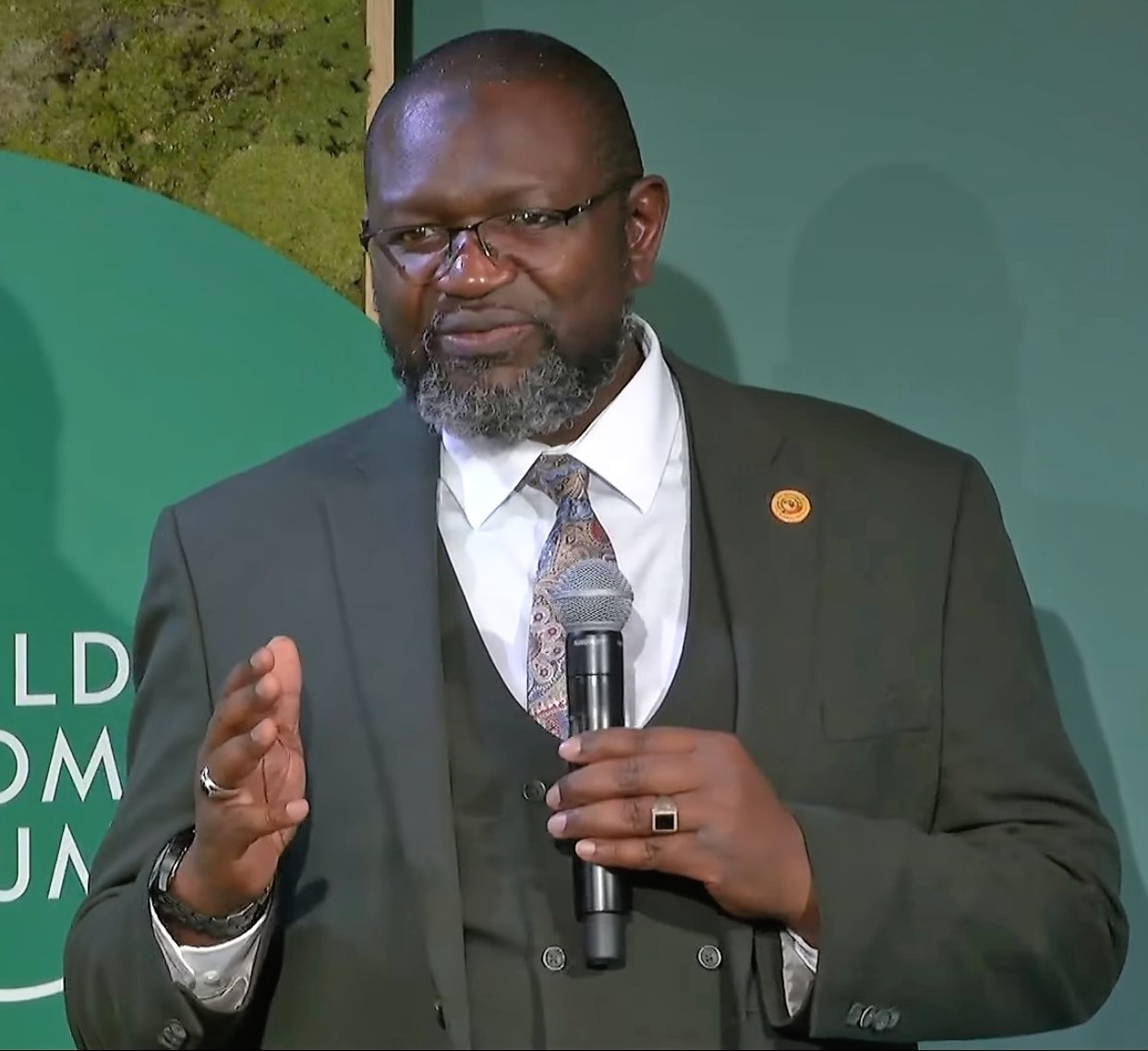
- Ogwell Ouma speaks at the 2023 World Economic Forum
- Born: 1969 (age 56–57); Kenya
- Education: University of Nairobi
- Scientific career
- Workplaces: Africa Centres for Disease Control and Prevention

Ahmed E. Ogwell Ouma (born 1969) is a Kenyan public health specialist working in health policy, health security, global health diplomacy and non-communicable diseases. He was the acting director and deputy director-general of the Africa Centres for Disease Control and Prevention. He is the vice president for global health strategy at the United Nations Foundation.

== Early life and education ==
Ahmed Ogwell was born and raised in the seaside city of Mombasa, Kenya. He attended his early schooling in Mombasa, progressed to Lenana School in Nairobi for his secondary education and later joined the University of Nairobi, where he completed a Bachelor's in Dental Surgery and a master's degree in Public Health (MPH). In 2000 he moved to the University of Bergen where he attained a Master of Philosophy (MPhil) in International Health.

== Career ==
Ogwell became interested in working in health after being ill as a child. While at medical school, he decided to focus on prevention and control of diseases rather than doing clinical work. Having lost both his parents and his sister to cancer, Ogwell worked on the prevention of non-communicable diseases. He started at the Ministry of Health, where he led the work of non-communicable diseases and later moved to set up the Office for International Health Relations. He then moved to the World Health Organization to lead the Secretariat of the WHO Framework Convention on Tobacco Control. He later moved to the Africa Regional Office of WHO in Brazzaville before moving back to Geneva as a senior advisor to the Assistant Director-General responsible for the Global Coordination Mechanism on non-communicable diseases.

Ogwell was hired as the inaugural deputy director for Africa Centres for Disease Control and Prevention in 2019. He assumed the role of acting director in 2022 when Dr. John Nkengasong was appointed the US ambassador to PEPFAR. During the height of the COVID-19 pandemic, Ogwell was essentially the chief of operations at the Africa CDC and also responsible for liaison with various partnerships.

Ogwell has led the Africa CDC to advocate for the New Public Health Order, which is a vision for Africa to reset its role in global health security.

Ogwell was appointed the vice president for global strategy at the United Nations Foundation in May 2024.

== Select publications ==
- Marguerite M Loembe; Akhona Tshangela; Stephanie J Salyer; Jay K Varma; Ahmed E Ogwell Ouma; John N Nkengasong (2020). "COVID-19 in Africa: the spread and response". Nature medicine. doi:10.1038/s41591-020-0961-x. PMID 32528154. Wikidata Q96302877.
- Sofonias K Tessema; Seth C Inzaule; Alan Christoffels; Yenew Kebede; Tulio de Oliveira; Ahmed E Ogwell Ouma; Christian T Happi; John N Nkengasong (2020). "Accelerating genomics-based surveillance for COVID-19 response in Africa". The Lancet Microbe. doi:10.1016/s2666-5247(20)30117-8. PMID 32838350. Wikidata Q98663518.
- Nigar Nargis; Yahya Manneh; Bakary Krubally; Baboucarr Jobe; Ahmed E Ogwell Ouma; Noureiny Tcha-Kondor; Evan H Blecher (2016). "How effective has tobacco tax increase been in the Gambia? A case study of tobacco control". BMJ Open. 6 (8) e010413. doi:10.1136/bmjopen-2015-010413. PMC 5013455. PMID 27566626. Wikidata Q37236808.

== Personal life ==
Ogwell is married with children.
