= MenAfriVac =

Vaccine developed for use in sub-Saharan Africa

Meningococcal A conjugate vaccine, Iyophilized
Vaccine description
- Target: Neisseria meningitidis A
- Vaccine type: Conjugate

Clinical data
- Trade names: MenAfriVac
- Other names: Meningococcal A Polysaccharide-Protein Conjugate Vaccine (MenA PS-PCV)
- Routes of administration: Intramuscular
- ATC code: J07AH10 (WHO)

Legal status
- Legal status: Rx, WHO prequalified

MenAfriVac is a meningococcal vaccine developed for use in sub-Saharan Africa for children and adults between 9 months and 29 years of age against meningococcal bacterium Neisseria meningitidis group A. The vaccine costs less than US$0.50 per dose.

== History ==
Epidemics of meningococcal A meningitis, which is a bacterial infection of the thin lining surrounding the brain and spinal cord, have swept across 26 countries in sub-Saharan Africa for a century, killing and disabling young people every year. The disease is highly feared on the continent; it can kill or cause severe brain damage in a child within hours. Epidemics usually start at the beginning of the calendar year when dry sands from the Sahara Desert begin blowing southward.

The largest meningitis epidemic in African history swept across sub-Saharan Africa from 1996 to 1997, numbering 250,000 new cases and taking 25,000 lives. Three years later, the World Health Organization (WHO) held a technical consultation in Cairo, Egypt with African ministers of health and global health leaders to discuss meningitis and the development of a new vaccine.

At that meeting, representatives from eight African countries issued a statement saying that the development of a meningococcal vaccine to prevent epidemics was a high priority for them, and concluded that a conjugate meningococcal vaccine would have the potential to prevent future epidemics. They estimated that the new vaccine could become available in three to seven years for US$0.40 to $1 a dose, providing protection for at least ten years.

A year later, in 2001, the Bill & Melinda Gates Foundation provided a ten-year, $70 million grant to establish the Meningitis Vaccine Project, a partnership between PATH and WHO. The foundation charged the new project with development, testing, licensure and mass introduction of a meningococcal conjugate vaccine.

In 2002, the collaboration supported reinforced meningitis surveillance activities in 12 countries in Africa: Benin, Burkina Faso, Cameroon, Central African Republic, Chad, Ethiopia, Ghana, Ivory Coast, Mali, Niger, Nigeria and Togo. The surveillance indicated an increased risk of outbreaks in the future and the continued need for a vaccine. MenAfriVac became available for widespread use in African meningitis belt countries in 2010. Distribution in Mali and Niger was assisted by Médecins Sans Frontières.

=== Effectiveness evaluation ===
A 2013 article published in The Lancet reported that the MenAfriVac vaccination campaign in Chad reduced meningitis incidence by 94%. In three regions of Chad, approximately 1.8 million people from 1 to 29 years old received a single dose of the vaccine in December 2011. Vaccinating 70% of the population in that age group is enough to create "herd immunity". During the 2012 meningitis season no cases of the meningococcus sub-type serogroup A caused disease in places where mass vaccination took place. Carriers of serogroup A were found to decrease by more than 97% post-vaccination. Surveillance is needed to continue for several more years to establish the length of effective period of the vaccine and whether other meningococci serogroups may surge to replace serogroup A.

In November 2015, a special collection of 29 articles was published in the journal Clinical Infectious Diseases—with guest editors from Public Health England and the former Meningitis Vaccine Project about the steps taken for the development, introduction, and evaluation of MenAfriVac. Immunization with MenAfriVac has led to the control and near elimination of deadly meningitis A disease in the African "meningitis belt". In 2013, only four laboratory-confirmed cases of meningitis A were reported by the 26 countries in the meningitis belt. But scientists warned that unless countries within the belt incorporate the meningitis A vaccine in routine immunization schedules for infants, there is a risk that the disease could rebound in 15 years' time. One of the journal studies found that a childhood vaccination strategy will be much cheaper than reacting to future epidemics with disruptive and costly case management and mass vaccination campaigns.

=== Eradication ===
In 2015, the caseload of the illness fell to zero in 16 countries that used MenAfriVac in mass vaccination campaigns. Ten other countries have not launched vaccination programs. Epidemics were expected to return in about 15 years unless MenAfriVac becomes a routine childhood vaccination as WHO recommended.

The tetanus toxoid protein used in the vaccine increased the share of people with long-term tetanus immunity from 20% to 59%, although it is not strong enough to stand alone against tetanus. Neonatal tetanus kills nearly 50,000 newborns a year in sub-Saharan Africa. Rates of neonatal tetanus fell by 25% in countries following a MenAfriVac campaign.

== Manufacture ==
The Meningitis Vaccine Project partnered with SynCo Bio Partners, a Dutch biotech company, and the US government's Center for Biologics Evaluation and Research to develop MenAfriVac, and the Serum Institute of India to manufacture it.

MenAfriVac is a freeze-dried vaccine of a polysaccharide from a type of Neisseria meningitidis called group A. The polysaccharide has been purified by affinity chromatography and bound to a carrier protein called tetanus toxoid (TT). The TT is prepared by extraction by ammonium sulfate precipitation and the toxin is inactivated with formalin from cultures of Clostridium tetani grown in a modified Mueller–Hinton agar.

== Storage ==
MenAfriVac remains stable for 4 days under 40 °C (104 °F). As a result the WHO has cleared it for controlled temperature chain use, which means that MenAfriVac vaccination drives are allowed be conducted even when there is no refrigeration at the point of care.
