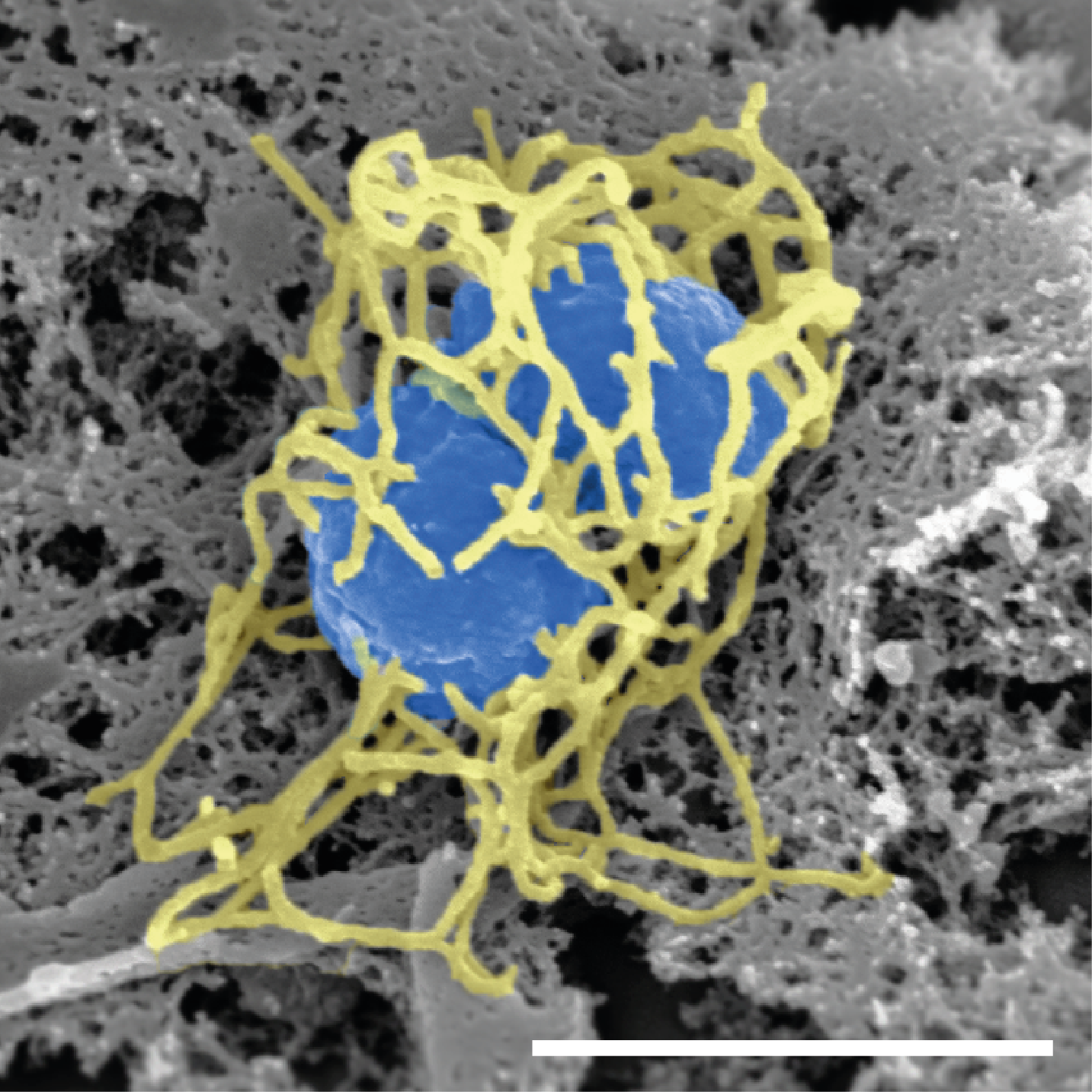
- Scanning electron micrograph of a single N. meningitidis cell (colorized in blue) with its adhesive pili (colorized in yellow). The scale bar corresponds to 1 µm.

Scientific classification
- Domain: Bacteria
- Kingdom: Pseudomonadati
- Phylum: Pseudomonadota
- Class: Betaproteobacteria
- Order: Neisseriales
- Family: Neisseriaceae
- Genus: Neisseria
- Species: N. meningitidis

Binomial name
- Neisseria meningitidis Albrecht & Ghon 1901

= Neisseria meningitidis =

Species of bacterium that can cause meningitis

Neisseria meningitidis, often referred to as the meningococcus, is a Gram-negative bacterium that can cause meningitis and other forms of meningococcal disease such as meningococcemia, a life-threatening sepsis. The bacterium is referred to as a coccus because it is round, and more specifically a diplococcus because of its tendency to form pairs.

About 10% of adults are carriers of the bacteria in their nasopharynx. As an exclusively human pathogen, it causes developmental impairment and death in about 10% of cases. It causes the only form of bacterial meningitis known to occur epidemically, mainly in Africa and Asia. It occurs worldwide in both epidemic and endemic form.

N. meningitidis is spread through saliva and respiratory secretions during coughing, sneezing, kissing, chewing on toys and through sharing a source of fresh water. It has also been reported to be transmitted through oral sex and to cause urethritis in longer urethral linings. It infects its host cells by sticking to them with long, thin (spindly) extensions called pili; and the surface-exposed proteins Opa and Opc and have several virulence factors.

== Signs and symptoms ==
Meningococcus can cause meningitis and other forms of meningococcal disease. It initially produces general symptoms like fatigue, fever, and headache and can rapidly progress to neck stiffness, coma and death in 10% of cases. Petechiae occur in about 50% of cases. Chance of survival is highly correlated with blood cortisol levels, with lower levels prior to steroid administration corresponding with increased patient mortality. Symptoms of meningococcal meningitis are easily confused with those caused by other bacteria, such as Haemophilus influenzae and Streptococcus pneumoniae. Suspicion of meningitis is a medical emergency and immediate medical assessment is recommended. Current guidance in the United Kingdom is that if a case of meningococcal meningitis or septicaemia (infection of the blood) is suspected, intravenous antibiotics should be given and the ill person admitted to the hospital. This means that laboratory tests may be less likely to confirm the presence of Neisseria meningitidis as the antibiotics will dramatically lower the number of bacteria in the body. The UK guidance is based on the idea that the reduced ability to identify the bacteria is outweighed by reduced chance of death.

Septicaemia caused by Neisseria meningitidis has received much less public attention than meningococcal meningitis even though septicaemia has been linked to infant deaths. Meningococcal septicaemia typically causes a purpuric rash, that does not lose its color when pressed with a glass slide ("non-blanching") and does not cause the classical symptoms of meningitis. This means the condition may be ignored by those not aware of the significance of the rash. Septicaemia carries an approximate 50% mortality rate over a few hours from initial onset.

Other severe complications include Waterhouse–Friderichsen syndrome, a massive, usually bilateral, hemorrhage into the adrenal glands caused by fulminant meningococcemia, adrenal insufficiency, and disseminated intravascular coagulation. Not all instances of a purpura-like rash are due to meningococcal septicaemia; other possible causes, such as idiopathic thrombocytopenic purpura (ITP; a platelet disorder) and Henoch–Schönlein purpura, also need prompt investigation.

== Microbiology ==
N. meningitidis is a Gram-negative diplococcus since it has an outer and inner membranes with a thin layer of peptidoglycan in between. It is 0.6–1.0 micrometers in size. It tests positive for the enzyme cytochrome c oxidase.

=== Habitat ===
N. meningitidis is a part of the normal nonpathogenic flora in the nasopharynx of up to 8–25% of adults. It colonizes and infects only humans, and has never been isolated from other animals. This is thought to result from the bacterium's inability to get iron from sources other than human transferrin and lactoferrin.

=== Subtypes ===
Disease-causing strains are classified according to the antigenic structure of their polysaccharide capsule. Serotype distribution varies markedly around the world. Among the 13 identified capsular types of N. meningitidis, six (A, B, C, W135, X, and Y) account for most disease cases worldwide. Type A has been the most prevalent in Africa and Asia, but is rare/practically absent in North America. In the United States, serogroup B is the predominant cause of disease and mortality, followed by serogroup C. The multiple subtypes have hindered development of a universal vaccine for meningococcal disease.

== Pathogenesis ==
=== Virulence ===
Lipooligosaccharide (LOS) is a component of the outer membrane of N. meningitidis. This acts as an endotoxin and is responsible for septic shock and hemorrhage due to the destruction of red blood cells. Other virulence factors include a polysaccharide capsule which prevents host phagocytosis and aids in evasion of the host immune response. Adhesion is another key virulence strategy to successfully invade host cell. There are several known proteins that are involved in adhesion and invasion, or mediate interactions with specific host cell receptors. These include the Type IV pilin adhesin which mediates attachment of the bacterium to the epithelial cells of the nasopharynx, surface-exposed Opa and Opc proteins which mediate interactions with specific host cell receptors, and NadA which is involved in adhesion.

Pathogenic meningococci that have invaded into the bloodstream must be able to survive in the new niche, this is facilitated by acquisition and utilisation of iron (FetA and Hmbr), resisting intracellular oxidative killing by producing catalase and superoxide dismutase and ability to avoid complement mediated killing (fHbp). Meningococci produce an IgA protease, an enzyme that cleaves IgA class antibodies and thus allows the bacteria to evade a subclass of the humoral immune system.

A hypervirulent strain was discovered in China. Its impact is yet to be determined.

=== Complement inhibition ===
Factor H binding protein (fHbp) that is exhibited in N. meningitidis and some commensal species is the main inhibitor of the alternative complement pathway. fHbp protects meningococci from complement-mediated death in human serum experiments, but has also been shown to protect meningococci from antimicrobial peptides in vitro. Factor H binding protein is key to the pathogenesis of N. meningitidis, and is, therefore, important as a potential vaccine candidate. Porins are also an important factor for complement inhibition for both pathogenic and commensal species. Porins are important for nutrient acquisition. Porins are also recognized by TLR2, they bind complement factors (C3b, C4b, factor H, and C4bp (complement factor 4b-binding protein)). Cooperation with pili for CR3-mediated internalization is another function of porins. Ability to translocate into host cells and modulate reactive oxygen species production and apoptosis is made possible by porins, as well. Strains of the same species can express different porins.

== Genome Structure ==
At least 8 complete genomes of Neisseria meningitidis strains have been determined which encode about 2,100 to 2,500 proteins.

The genome of strain MC58 (serogroup B) has 2,272,351 base pairs. When sequenced in 2000, it was found to contain 2158 open reading frames (ORFs). Of these, a biological function was predicted for 1158 (53.7%). There were three major islands of horizontal DNA transfer found. Two encode proteins involved in pathogenicity. The third island only codes for hypothetical proteins. They also found more genes that undergo phase variation than any pathogen then known. Phase variation is a mechanism that helps the pathogen to evade the immune system of the host.

The genome size of strain H44/76 is 2.18 Mb, and encodes 2,480 open reading frames (ORFs), compared to 2.27 Mb and 2,465 ORFs for MC58. Both strains have a GC content of 51.5%. A comparison with MC58 showed that four genes are uniquely present in H44/76 and nine genes are only present in MC58. Of all ORFs in H44/76, 2,317 (93%) show more than 99% sequence identity.

The complete genome sequence of strain NMA510612 (serogroup A) consists of one circular chromosome with a size of 2,188,020 bp, and the average GC content is 51.5%. The chromosome is predicted to possess 4 rRNA operons, 163 insertion elements (IS), 59 tRNAs, and 2,462 ORFs.

There is a public database available for N. meningitidis core genome Multilocus sequence typing (cgMLST). Available at: Neisseria typing

== Genetic transformation ==
Genetic transformation is the process by which a recipient bacterial cell takes up DNA from a neighboring cell and integrates this DNA into the recipient's genome by recombination. In N. meningitidis, DNA transformation requires the presence of short DNA sequences (9–10 mers residing in coding regions) of the donor DNA. These sequences are called DNA uptake sequences (DUSs). Specific recognition of these sequences is mediated by a type IV pilin. In N. meningitidis DUSs occur at a significantly higher density in genes involved in DNA repair and recombination (as well as in restriction-modification and replication) than in other annotated gene groups. The over-representation of DUS in DNA repair and recombination genes may reflect the benefit of maintaining the integrity of the DNA repair and recombination machinery by preferentially taking up genome maintenance genes, that could replace their damaged counterparts in the recipient cell.

N. meningititis colonizes the nasopharyngeal mucosa, which is rich in macrophages. Upon their activation, macrophages produce superoxide (O_{2}^{−}) and hydrogen peroxide (H_{2}O_{2}). Thus N. meningitidis is likely to encounter oxidative stress during its life cycle. Consequently, an important benefit of genetic transformation to N. meningitidis may be the maintenance of the recombination and repair machinery of the cell that removes oxidative DNA damages such as those caused by reactive oxygen. This is consistent with the more general idea that transformation benefits bacterial pathogens by facilitating repair of DNA damages produced by the oxidative defenses of the host during infection.

Meningococci population is extensively diverse genetically, this is due to horizontal gene transfers while in the nasophanrynx. Gene transfer can occur within and between genomes of Neisseria species, and it is the main mechanism of acquiring new traits. This is facilitated by the natural competence of the meningococci to take up foreign DNA. The commensal species of Neisseria can act as a reservoir of genes that can be acquired; for example, this is how capsule switching can occur as a means of hiding from the immune system. An invasive N. meningitidis strain of serogroup C broke out in Nigeria in 2013 – the strain was a new sequence type, ST-10217 determined by multilocus sequence typing. It was determined that a commensal strain of N. meningitidis acquired an 8-kb prophage, the meningococcal disease-associated island (MDAΦ), previously associated with hyper-invasiveness; and the full serogroup C capsule operon, thus becoming a hypervirulent strain. This illustrates how hypervirulent strains can arise from non-pathgenic strains due to the high propensity of gene transfers and DNA uptake by N. meningitidis.

== Diagnosis ==
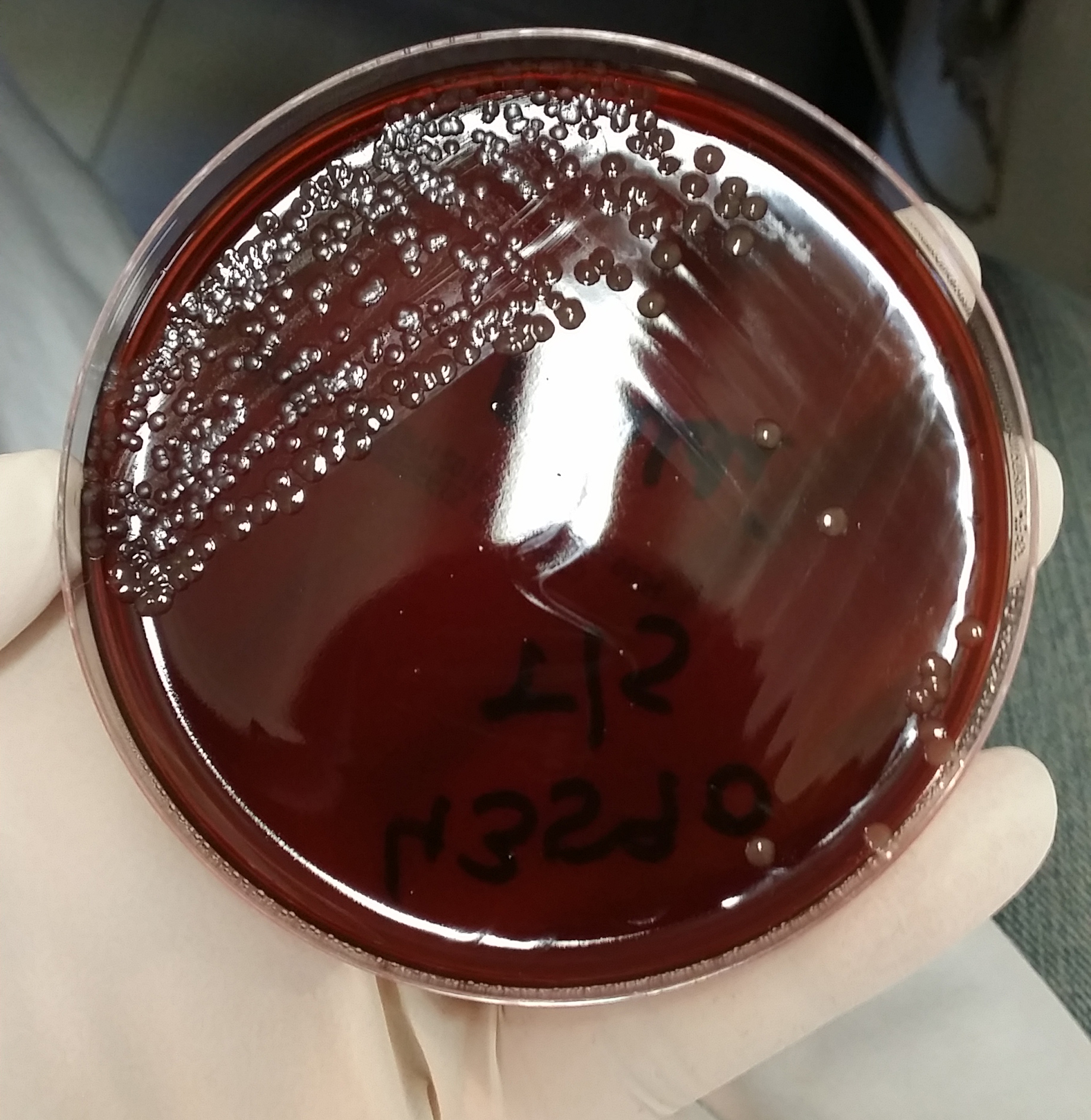
The growth of Neisseria meningitidis colonies on New York City agar

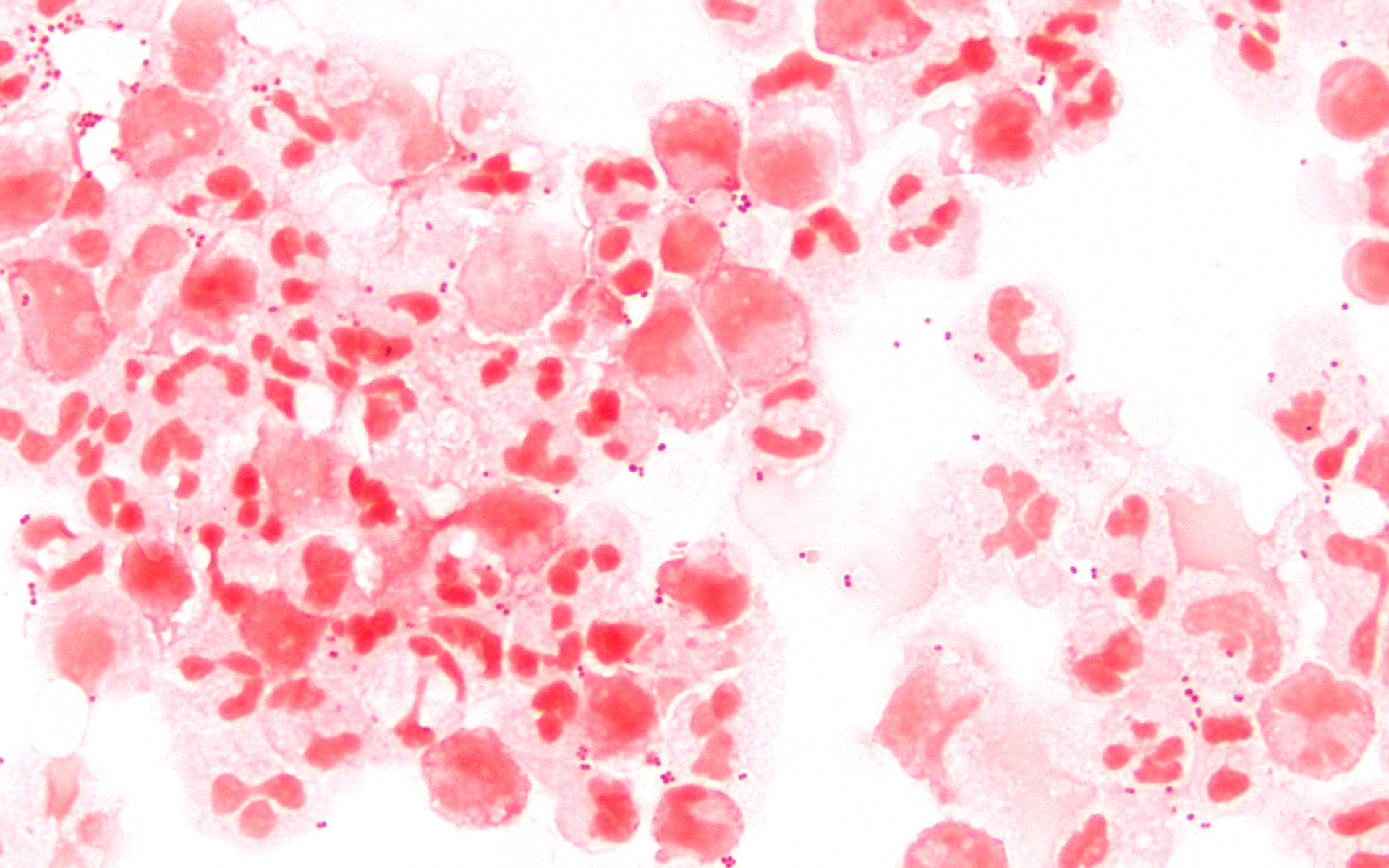
Neisseria meningitidis in cerebrospinal fluid (CSF) seen by Gram stain at 1000× magnification

A small amount of cerebrospinal fluid (CSF) is sent to the laboratory as soon as possible for analysis. The diagnosis is suspected, when Gram-negative diplococci are seen on Gram stain of a centrifuged sample of CSF; sometimes they are located inside white blood cells. The microscopic identification takes around 1–2 hours after specimen arrival in the laboratory.

The gold standard of diagnosis is microbiological isolation of N. meningitidis by growth from a sterile body fluid, which could be CSF or blood. Diagnosis is confirmed when the organism has grown, most often on a chocolate agar plate, but also on Thayer–Martin agar. To differentiate any bacterial growth from other species a small amount of a bacterial colony is Gram stained and tested for oxidase and catalase. Gram negative diplococci that are oxidase and catalase positive are then tested for fermentation of the following carbohydrates: maltose, sucrose, and glucose. N. meningitidis will ferment glucose and maltose. Finally, serology determines the subgroup of the N. meningitidis, which is important for epidemiological surveillance purposes; this may often only be done in specialized laboratories.

The above tests take a minimum of 48–72 hours turnaround time for growing the organism, and up to a week more for serotyping. Growth can and often does fail, either because antibiotics have been given preemptively, or because specimens have been inappropriately transported, as the organism is extremely susceptible to antibiotics and fastidious in its temperature, CO_{2} and growth medium requirements.

Polymerase chain reaction (PCR) tests where available, mostly in industrialized countries, have been increasingly used; PCR can rapidly identify the organism, and works even after antibiotics have been given.

== Prevention ==
All recent contacts of the infected patient over the seven days before onset should receive medication to prevent them from contracting the infection. This especially includes young children and their child caregivers or nursery-school contacts, as well as anyone who had direct exposure to the patient through kissing, sharing utensils, or medical interventions such as mouth-to-mouth resuscitation. Anyone who frequently ate, slept or stayed at the patient's home during the seven days before the onset of symptom, or those who sat beside the patient on an airplane flight or classroom for eight hours or longer, should also receive chemoprophylaxis. The agent of choice is usually oral rifampicin for a few days.

Receiving a dose of the meningococcal vaccine before traveling to a country in the "meningitis belt" or having a booster meningitis vaccine, normally five years apart could prevent someone from getting an infection from the pathogen.

=== Vaccination ===
==== United States ====
A number of vaccines are available in the U.S. to prevent meningococcal disease. Some of the vaccines cover serogroup B, while others cover A, C, W, and Y. The Centers for Disease Control and Prevention (CDC) recommends all teenagers receive MenACWY vaccine and booster, with optional MenB. MenACWY and MenB are also recommended for people of other ages with various medical conditions and social risk factors.

A meningococcal polysaccharide vaccine (MPSV4) has been available since the 1970s and is the only meningococcal vaccine licensed for people older than 55. MPSV4 may be used in people 2–55 years old if the MCV4 vaccines are not available or contraindicated. Two meningococcal conjugate vaccines (MCV4) are licensed for use in the U.S. The first conjugate vaccine was licensed in 2005, the second in 2010. Conjugate vaccines are the preferred vaccine for people 2 through 55 years of age. It is indicated in those with impaired immunity, such as nephrotic syndrome or splenectomy.

In June 2012, the U.S. Food and Drug Administration (FDA) approved a combination vaccine against two types of meningococcal diseases and Hib disease for infants and children 6 weeks to 18 months old. The vaccine, Menhibrix, was designed to prevent disease caused by Neisseria meningitidis serogroups C and Y, and Haemophilus influenzae type b (Hib). It was the first meningococcal vaccine that could be given to infants as young as six weeks old.

In October 2014 the FDA approved the first vaccine effective against serogroup B, named Trumenba, for use in 10- to 25-year-old individuals.

==== Africa ====
In 2010, the Meningitis Vaccine Project introduced a vaccine called MenAfriVac in the African meningitis belt. It was made by generic drug maker Serum Institute of India and cost 50 U.S. cents per injection. Beginning in Burkina Faso in 2010, it has been given to 215 million people across Benin, Cameroon, Chad, Ivory Coast, Ethiopia, Ghana, Mali, Niger, Mauritania, Nigeria, Senegal, Sudan, Togo and Gambia. The vaccination campaign has resulted in near-elimination of serogroup A meningitis from the participating countries.

== Treatment ==
Persons with confirmed N. meningitidis infection should be hospitalized immediately for treatment with antibiotics. Because meningococcal disease can disseminate very rapidly, a single dose of intramuscular antibiotic is often given at the earliest possible opportunity, even before hospitalization, if disease symptoms look suspicious enough. Third-generation cephalosporin antibiotics (i.e. cefotaxime, ceftriaxone) should be used to treat a suspected or culture-proven meningococcal infection before antibiotic susceptibility results are available. Clinical practice guidelines endorse empirical treatment in the event a lumbar puncture to collect cerebrospinal fluid (CSF) for laboratory testing cannot first be performed. Antibiotic treatment may affect the results of microbiology tests, but a diagnosis may be made on the basis of blood-cultures and clinical examination.

== Epidemiology ==
N. meningitidis is a major cause of illness, developmental impairment and death during childhood in industrialized countries and has been responsible for epidemics in Africa and in Asia. Every year, about 2,500 to 3,500 people become infected with N. meningitidis in the US, with a frequency of about 1 in 100,000. Children younger than five years are at greatest risk, followed by teenagers of high school age. Rates in the African meningitis belt were as high as 1 in 1,000 to 1 in 100 before introduction of a vaccine in 2010. The incidence of meningococcal disease is highest among infants (children younger than one year old) whose immune system is relatively immature. In industrialized countries there is a second peak of incidence in young adults, who are congregating closely, living in dormitories or smoking. Vaccine development is ongoing.

It is spread through saliva and other respiratory secretions during coughing, sneezing, kissing, and chewing on toys. Inhalation of respiratory droplets from a carrier which may be someone who is themselves in the early stages of disease can transmit the bacteria. Close contact with a carrier is the predominant risk factor. Other risk factors include a weakened general or local immune response, such as a recent upper respiratory infection, smoking, and complement deficiency. The incubation period is short, from 2 to 10 days. In susceptible individuals, N. meningitidis may invade the bloodstream and cause a systemic infection, sepsis, disseminated intravascular coagulation, breakdown of circulation, and septic shock.

== History ==
In 1884 Ettore Marchiafava and Angelo Celli first observed the bacterium inside cells in the cerebral spinal fluid (CSF). In 1887 Anton Weichselbaum isolated the bacterium from the CSF of patients with bacterial meningitis. He named the bacterium Diplococcus intracellularis meningitidis.

== Biotechnology ==
Components from Neisseria meningitidis are being harnessed in biotechnology. Its Cas9 enzyme is a useful tool in CRISPR gene editing because the enzyme is small and has distinct targeting features to the commonly used enzyme from Streptococcus pyogenes. The cell-surface protein FrpC from Neisseria meningitidis has been engineered to allow covalent coupling between proteins, because it generates a reactive anhydride when exposed to calcium. The bacterium also expresses unique enzymes able to cleave IgA antibodies.

== See also ==
- DNA uptake sequence DNA taken up by Neisseria
- NmVac4-A/C/Y/W-135 polysaccharide vaccine
- Sara Branham Matthews microbiologist
- Shwartzman phenomenon
- Sepsis
