= Acct URI scheme =

The acct URI scheme is a proposed internet standard published by the Internet Engineering Task Force, defined by RFC 7565. The purpose of the scheme is to identify, rather than interact, with user accounts hosted by a service provider. This scheme differs from the DNS name which specifies the service provider.

The acct URI was intended to be the single URI scheme that would return information about a person (or possibly a thing) that holds an account at a given domain.

The acct URI scheme is used by the WebFinger protocol.

== Example ==
The following is an example of an acct URI:

acct:juliet%40capulet.example@shoppingsite.example
