= AC/DShe =

American all-female AC/DC tribute band

- The logo is a modified version of the AC/DC logo

Background information
- Origin: San Francisco, California, U.S.
- Genres: Hard rock Tribute
- Years active: 1997–present
- Members: Amy Ward (Bonny Scott); Nicki Williams (Riff Williams); Sara Brownell (Mallory Young); Tina Gordon (Philomena Rudd); Pamela Ausejo (Agnes Young)
- Past members: Tina Lucchesi (Phyllis Rudd); Erin McDermott (Mallory Young); Alison Victor (Agnes Young); Natalie (Mallory Young); Clementine (Phyllis Rudd); Gretchen Menn (Agnes Young)
- Website: acdshe.com

AC/DShe (pronounced A C - D She) is an all-female AC/DC tribute band. The band, which was founded in San Francisco, covers only pre-1980s AC/DC songs (thus those written while Bon Scott was still alive). The band was created by Nicki Williams and Amy Ward in 1997. AC/DShe has toured throughout the US and in Europe and performed at the AC/DC tribute festival in Wales in 2004.

In November 2001, the band began receiving significant media coverage, starting with a feature article in Details Magazine. The band also has received national and international press since then, alongside other gender-specific tribute acts such as Lez Zeppelin and Mandonna. They were also featured in an article on Hustler magazine that covered all-female tribute bands.

== Members ==
Current members

- Amy Ward (Bonny Scott) – lead vocals
- Nicki Williams (Riff Williams) – bass, backing vocals
- Sara Brownell (Mallory Young) – rhythm guitar, backing vocals
- Tina Gordon (Philomena Rudd) – drums
- Pamela Ausejo (Agnes Young) – lead guitar

Former members

- Tina Lucchesi (Phyllis Rudd) – drums
- Erin McDermott (Mallory Young) – rhythm guitar, backing vocals
- Alison Victor (Agnes Young) – lead guitar
- Natalie Smith (Mallory Young) – rhythm guitar, backing vocals
- Clementine Ross (Phyllis Rudd) – drums
- Gretchen Menn (Agnes Young) – lead guitar
