= Asian Community Development Corporation =

U.S. non-profit organization

- Founded: May 29, 1987
- Type: 501(c)(3)
- Purpose: Community Development
- Region served: Greater Boston with a focus on Chinatown, Boston
- Method: Affordable housing for renters and owners; promoting economic development; fostering leadership development; building capacity within the community and advocating on behalf of the Asian American community
- Key people: Angie Liou, Executive Director
- Revenue: $1,990,788 (Gross support and revenue, 2011)
- Website: asiancdc.org

The Asian Community Development Corporation (ACDC) is a 501(c)(3) community development organization founded in 1987 with a focus on serving the Asian American community of Greater Boston. This organization is centered upon preserving the culture and revitalizing Boston's Chinatown.

== History ==
The corporation began on May 29, 1987, in response to economic needs within the community.

== Programs ==
ACDC runs a variety of programs for individuals and families living in the Greater Boston region as well as the traditional Chinatown neighborhood. The corporation's stated goal through these programs is to "foster new leadership and give low and moderate income residents the tools and resources they need to stabilize their housing which may include buying their homes, participating in the change and growth of their neighborhoods. and contributing more fully to economic and civic life throughout the region." These programs include Community Organizing and Planning, Youth Programs, Housing Counseling and Assistance, and Real estate development.

== Selected program descriptions ==
=== Real estate development ===
The Asian Community Development Corporation has developed more than 500 affordable housing units, developed a home ownership program that has helped double the rate of ownership in Chinatown and developed an energy efficiency program.
