= SynCo Bio Partners =

Pharmaceutical company in Amsterdam, the Netherlands

SynCo Bio Partners B.V. is a biopharmaceutical good manufacturing practices (GMP) contract manufacturing organization (CMO) located in Amsterdam, the Netherlands, licensed for clinical and commercial GMP manufacturing of bulk drug substances and drug products. SynCo offers a fully integrated range of biopharmaceutical development and manufacturing services supporting small biotech to large pharmaceutical organizations worldwide from the earliest stages in process development, through preclinical and clinical trials, approval and market supply.

SynCo’s multi-purpose GMP facilities offer manufacturing capabilities for microbial- and mammalian-based biopharmaceuticals for worldwide supply. It is one of approximately ten biopharmaceutical CMOs in the world with both clinical and commercial manufacturing experience. SynCo is a fully owned subsidiary of Wacker Biotech GmbH (a subsidiary of Wacker Chemie AG).

== History ==
- 1988 - Cetus Corporation, Emeryville, CA, US establishes its European headquarters, EuroCetus B.V. in Amsterdam, the Netherlands.
- 1990-1991 - EuroCetus facility licensed for production and release of ProLeukin (IL-2) for Europe and rest of world, except US and Japan.
- 1992 – Chiron Corporation acquires Cetus Corporation. Eurocetus B.V. becomes Chiron B.V.
- 1996 – Facility licensed for commercial production of Pertussis vaccine.
- 1997 – Facility licensed by WHO for commercial production of Meningitis A polysaccharides.
- 1997-1999 – Facility licensed by UK, MCA and Italian Health Branch for Meningitis C polysaccharide and CRM197 carrier protein for conjugated vaccine Menjugate.
- 2000 – Facility acquired by Dr William J. Rutter. SynCo Bio Partners B.V. established.
- 2001 – Facility licensed by European Medicines Agency and Health Canada for Meningitis C polysaccharides and CRM197 carrier protein for Menjugate production.
- 2004 – Installation of new air handling systems completed for all of its facilities.
- 2005 – Installation of new aseptic filling machine in its Class A zone, allowing larger batches sizes and expansion of filling ranges.
- 2005 – Expansion of GMP facilities to allow production of a wider range of protein, vaccine and live biotherapeutic products.
- 2006 – Facility licensed by Korean FDA for commercial production.
- 2008 – Expansion of process development capabilities to enable a greater range of projects to be completed.
- 2009 – Facility licensed by Anvisa for commercial production.
- 2011 – Expansion of the Class A zone of its aseptic filling facility successfully completed, allowing SynCo to support new product launches in the US and the rest of the world.
- 2016 – Facility licensed by FDA for commercial production of VaxChora.
- 2018 – SynCo Bio Partners B.V. acquired by Wacker Chemie AG and has become part of Wacker Biotech GmbH.
