= ACDC (medicine) =

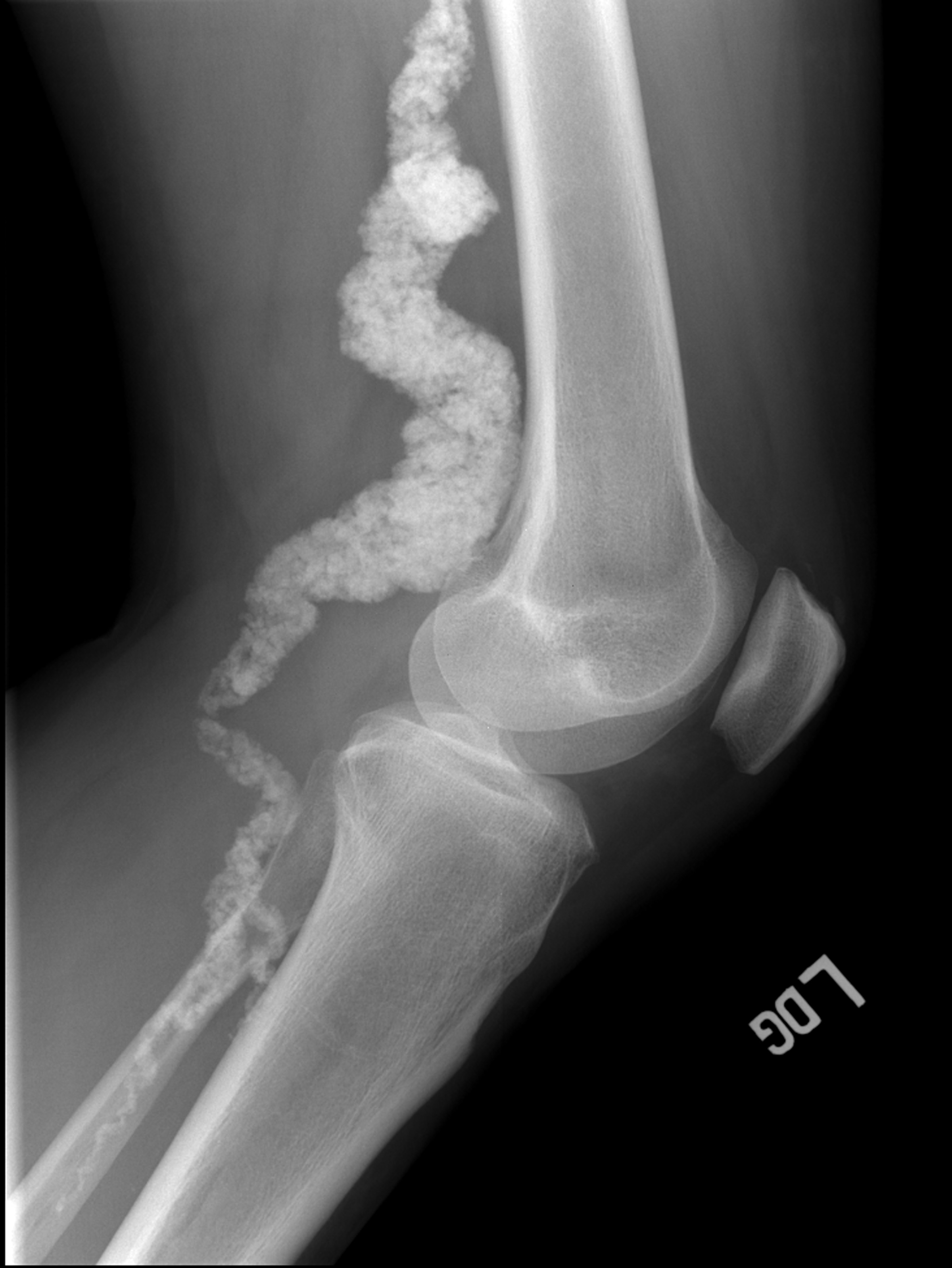
- A knee x-ray of a person with ACDC
- Specialty: Orthopedic

Arterial calcification due to deficiency of CD73 (ACDC) is a rare genetic disorder that causes calcium buildup in the arteries and joints of the hands and feet, and other areas below the waist. Although patients exhibiting these symptoms have been identified as early as 1914, this disorder had not been studied extensively until recently. The identification of the specific ACDC gene and mutations occurred in 2011. ACDC is caused by a mutation in the NT5E gene, which prevents calcium-removing agents from functioning. Patients with this mutation experience chronic pain, difficulty moving, and an increased risk of cardiovascular problems. In experiments at the molecular level, treatment with adenosine or a phosphatase inhibitor reversed and prevented calcification, suggesting they could be used as possible treatment methods. There is currently no cure for ACDC, and patients have limited treatment options, which focus primarily on the removal of blood calcium and improving mobility.

== Cause ==
In ACDC, the gene NT5E, which produces the enzyme CD73, is mutated. A mutation in NT5E causes CD73 to form incorrectly. A nonsense mutation, a single nucleotide insertion, and a missense mutation have all been found to produce essentially the same inactivation of CD73. Normally, CD73 binds to adenosine monophosphate, a nucleotide in DNA, and converts it to adenosine. In affected patients, little to no CD73 was functional. The calcification of cells is caused in part by a lack of pyrophosphate, which is broken down throughout the body by tissue-nonspecific alkaline phosphatase (TNAP). Without pyrophosphate, calcium phosphate crystals cannot be broken down. Since the inactive CD73 is unable to produce adenosine, which inhibits TNAP, there is an increase in TNAP levels and a decrease in pyrophosphate levels.

== Treatment ==
The gene NT5E is related to the gene ENPP1, which when mutated is known to cause arterial calcification in infants. Treatments for the ENPP1 mutation, such as bisphosphonates, which are non-hydrolysable pyrophosphate analogs, and adenosine reuptake inhibitors, provide possible routes of treatment for the NT5E mutation, as the mechanism of both disorders are very similar.
