= ACDC domain =

AP2-Coincident Domain mainly at the Carboxy-terminus domain

Identifiers
- Symbol: ACDC
- Pfam: PF14733
Available protein structures:
- PDB: PF14733 (ECOD; PDBsum)
- AlphaFold: PF14733

The AP2-Coincident Domain mainly at the Carboxy-terminus, or ACDC domain, is a protein domain that occurs in proteins from apicomplexan parasites. The function of this domain is unknown. The ACDC domain contains a unique noncanonical four-helix bundle. Biochemical studies of various anti-malarial compounds found five lead-based compounds bound to the hydrophobic pocket formed by the four-helix bundle, implicating this domain as a potential target for future treatments.

The ACDC domain is found exclusively in apicomplexan proteins that also contain AP2 (Apetala 2-integrase) DNA binding domains (ApiAP2 proteins). In 8 of 9 known examples in the malarial parasite Plasmodium falciparum, the domain is located near the carboxy terminus, with the last example having it located at the amino terminus. Two proteins with the ACDC domain were found in the nucleus of P. falciparum, as detected by a proteomic method, suggesting a role in nuclear biology.
