= Account =

Account (abbreviated a/c) may refer to:

- Account (bookkeeping)
- A report
- A bank account
  - Deposit account
  - Personal account
  - Sweep account
  - Transaction account
- User account, the means by which a user can access a computer system
- Customer of a company, used in B2B business
  - account manager
  - account executive
