= African meningitis belt =

Region of Africa with high rate of incidence of meningitis

The meningitis belt, showing the distribution of meningococcal meningitis in Africa

The African meningitis belt is a region in sub-Saharan Africa where the rate of incidence of meningitis is very high. It extends from Senegal to Ethiopia, and the primary cause of meningitis in the belt is Neisseria meningitidis.

The belt was first proposed by Léon Lapeyssonnie of the World Health Organization (WHO) in 1963. Lapeyssonnie noticed that the disease occurred in areas receiving 300–1,100 mm of mean annual rainfall, which is the case in sub-Saharan Africa. Another analysis of the epidemiology of meningitis notes its intercontinental spread, traced to South Asia and brought by those making the Hajj, a pilgrimage to Saudi Arabia, in 1987, leading to epidemics in Nepal, Saudi Arabia, and Chad.

== Regions ==
The African meningitis belt consists of part of or all of (from West to East), the Gambia, Senegal, Guinea-Bissau, Guinea, Mali, Burkina Faso, Ghana, Niger, Nigeria, Cameroon, Chad, Central African Republic, Sudan, South Sudan, Uganda, Kenya, Ethiopia, Eritrea. Many other countries in Africa experience outbreaks as well, but they are less frequent and less interepidemic. The "belt" has an estimated 300 million people in its total area. The Sahel is not only prone to meningitis, but also very prone to epidemics such as malaria.

The most affected countries in the region are Burkina Faso, Chad, Ethiopia, and Niger. Burkina Faso, Ethiopia, and Niger were accountable for 65% of all cases in Africa. In major epidemics, the attack rate range is 100 to 800 people per 100,000. However, communities can have attack rates as high as 1000 per 100,000. During these epidemics, young children have the highest attack rates. More than 90,000 cases were reported in the belt in 2009, in comparison, less than 800 cases were reported in the United States in 2011.

== Epidemiology ==
Neisseria meningitidis is found in other parts of the world as well, but the highest rates occur in the "meningitis belt." Meningococcal disease is persistently high in this region. Large epidemics occur every 5–12 years, typically during the dry season (December–June). Incidence of the disease declines from May to June in the more humid weather. Other factors contributing to the sustained transmission of meningococcal disease include dust, other respiratory viruses that co-circulate, as well as close social contact.

Historically, 90% of outbreaks in the meningitis belt were primarily due to Neisseria meningitidis serogroup A (NmA). However, a monovalent serogroup A meningococcal conjugate vaccine (MenAfriVac) was introduced in the region in 2010. Since then, meningococcal outbreaks in the meningitis belt have primarily been due to serogroups C and W. A few serogroup X outbreaks have also been reported.

In the African meningitis belt, the WHO defines a meningococcal epidemic as at least 100 cases per 100,000 inhabitants in a year. At its peak, the incidence of meningococcal disease has reached rates of up to 1,000 cases per 100,000 inhabitants, such as during the epidemics of 1996 and 2000–2001. In the belt, fatality from NmA disease has been estimated at 10–15%, although higher rates have been seen in some settings. Around 10–20% of survivors of meningococcal meningitis are left with permanent neuropsychological conditions such as hearing loss, vision loss, epilepsy, or other neurological disorders. Young children are particularly vulnerable due to immaturity in their immune systems, which contributes to the disproportionate burden of the disease in Africa due to its young population.

== Meningitis vaccine ==
The Meningitis Vaccine Project was conceived in 2001 as an effort to stop the spread of meningitis in this region, producing the low-cost MenAfriVac in 2010. The MenAfriVac has since been used to great effect to the area, with the 16 countries that launched a mass vaccination campaign reporting no cases of meningcoccus in 2015. However, unless the vaccine becomes a routine childhood vaccination, the epidemic will return in 15 years among a new generation of unvaccinated kids.
