= 2003 in New Zealand =

- Decades: 1980s; 1990s; 2000s; 2010s; 2020s
- See also: History of New Zealand; List of years in New Zealand; Timeline of New Zealand history

The following lists events that happened during 2003 in New Zealand.

== Population ==
- Estimated population as of 31 December: 4,061,600.
- Increase since 31 December 2002: 72,000 (1.81%).
- Males per 100 Females: 96.2.

== Incumbents ==
=== Regal and viceregal ===
- Head of State – Elizabeth II
- Governor-General – Dame Silvia Cartwright PCNZM, DBE, QSO

=== Government ===
The 47th New Zealand Parliament continued. Government was a coalition between Labour and the small Progressive party with United Future supporting supply votes.

- Speaker of the House – Jonathan Hunt (Labour)
- Prime Minister – Helen Clark (Labour)
- Deputy Prime Minister – Michael Cullen (Labour)
- Minister of Finance – Michael Cullen (Labour)
- Minister of Foreign Affairs – Phil Goff (Labour)
- Chief Justice — Sian Elias

=== Opposition leaders ===
- National – Bill English then Don Brash (Leader of the Opposition)
- Greens – Jeanette Fitzsimons and Rod Donald
- Act – Richard Prebble
- New Zealand First – Winston Peters
- United Future – Peter Dunne

=== Main centre leaders ===
- Mayor of Auckland – John Banks
- Mayor of Hamilton – David Braithwaite
- Mayor of Wellington – Kerry Prendergast
- Mayor of Christchurch – Garry Moore
- Mayor of Dunedin – Sukhi Turner

== Events ==
- 11 February – Donna Awatere Huata is expelled from the caucus of political party ACT New Zealand. She remained in parliament.
- 1 April – the Government Communications Security Bureau Act 2003 received Royal Assent
- 24 April – New Zealand's population reaches the 4,000,000 mark, according to Statistics New Zealand's population clock.
- 3 June – Air Adventures flight crashes on approach to Christchurch Airport, killing eight on board
- 9 June – Announcement by the Prime Minister of the provision of a Defence Force engineering group of up to 60 personnel to work on reconstruction tasks in southern Iraq and, as part of New Zealand's continuing participation in Operation Enduring Freedom, of the intention to contribute to a Provincial Reconstruction Team in Afghanistan.
- 30 June – Announcement that the North Island population reaches 3 million, North Shore City reaches 200,000 and Porirua City reaches 50,000
- 5 July – 350 skiers and 70 staff were trapped in skifield facilities on Mount Ruapehu when a sudden storm closes the access road. All descend safely the next day.
- August – The Refugee Status Appeals Authority declares that Ahmed Zaoui is a genuine asylum seeker. He is moved from a maximum security to medium security prison as a result.
- 15 August – The Strongman Mine closes
- 22 August – A magnitude 7.2 earthquake strikes the remote Fiordland.
- 4 October – A state of emergency is declared in the Wellington Region due to flooding. Paekākāriki suffers damage.
- 28 October – Don Brash becomes parliamentary leader of the National Party.
- October – Australian company Toll Holdings completes a takeover of Tranz Rail
- 18 November – the Supreme Court declares that Donna Awatere Huata has no right to her parliamentary seat.
- Evangelical Christian based political party Destiny New Zealand formed.

== Arts and literature ==
=== Awards ===
- Nick Ascroft and Sarah Quigley win the Robert Burns Fellowship.

==== New Zealand Book Awards ====
- Readers' Choice: Playing God Glenn Colquhoun
- Non-fiction: Wine Atlas of New Zealand Michael Cooper
- Fiction: The Shag Incident Stephanie Johnson
- Poetry: Playing God Glenn Colquhoun
- History: No idle rich: The Wealthy in Canterbury & Otago 1840–1914 Jim McAloon
- Lifestyle and contemporary culture: Wine Atlas of New Zealand Michael Cooper
- Biography: A sort of conscience: The Wakefields Philip Temple
- Illustrative: Len Castle: Potter Nancy Pel and Len Castle
- Reference & Anthology: Spirit in a strange land: A Selection of New Zealand spiritual verse edited by Paul Morris, Harry Ricketts and Mike Grimshaw
- Environment* Te Araroa: The New Zealand Trail Geoff Chapple

==== New Zealand Music Awards ====
A number of new categories were introduced this year: 'Highest Selling NZ Album', 'Highest Selling NZ Single', 'Best Pacific Island Album' (its predecessor 'Best Polynesian Album' last presented in 1997), and 'Best Roots Music Album'. 'Best R&B/ Hip Hop Album' was renamed 'Best Urban Album'. Two categories were retired 'Best Children's Album', and 'Best Compilation'. This year was also the first to feature a Lifetime Achievement Award.

- Album of the Year: The Datsuns – The Datsuns
  - Pacifier – Pacifier
  - Goldenhorse – Riverhead
  - Bic Runga – Beautiful Collision
  - Nesian Mystik – Polysaturated
- Single of the Year: Goodshirt – Sophie
  - Che Fu – Misty Frequencies
  - Bic Runga – Get Some Sleep
  - Anika Moa – Falling in Love Again
  - Nesian Mystik – It's On
- Top Group: The Datsuns – The Datsuns
  - Goodshirt – Sophie
  - Nesian Mystik – Polysaturated
- Breakthrough Artist of the Year: The Datsuns – The Datsuns
  - Goldenhorse – Riverhead
  - Blindspott – Blindspott
- Best Male Vocalist: Che Fu – Misty Frequencies
  - Jon Toogood- Pacifier (Pacifier)
  - Te Awanui Pine Reeder (Nesian Mystik) – For The People
- Best Female Vocalist: Bic Runga – Beautiful Collision
  - Anika Moa – Falling in Love Again
  - Kirsten Morrell – Riverhead (Goldenhorse)
- Best Solo Artist (new category): Bic Runga – Beautiful Collision
  - Anika Moa – Falling in Love Again
  - Carly Binding – Alright With Me
- Best Urban Album: Nesian Mystik – Polysaturated
  - P Money – Big Things
  - Deceptikonz – Elimination
- Best Folk Album: not awarded
- Best Music Video: Joe Lonie – Sophie (Goodshirt)
  - Che Fu – Misty Frequencies
  - Chris Graham / Bic Runga – Something Good (Bic Runga)
- Outstanding International Achievement: The Datsuns
- Best Mana Reo Album: Ngahiwi Apanui – E Tau Nei
  - Hareruia Aperama – Waiata of Bob Marley Vol 2
  - Adam Whauwhau – He Hua O Roto
- Best Mana Maori Album: Upper Hutt Posse – Te Reo Maori Remixes
  - Soul Paua – Pohewa
  - Mahinarangi Tocker – Hei Ha
  - Brother J – Be Bop A Nui
- Highest Selling NZ Album (new category): Bic Runga – Beautiful Collision
- Highest Selling NZ Single (new category): Katchafire – Giddy Up
- Producer of the Year: Bic Runga – Beautiful Collision
  - P Money – Big Things (P Money)
  - Geoffrey Maddock – Riverhead (Goldenhorse)
- Engineer of the Year: Clint Murphy And Dave Rhodes – Blindspott
  - Jeremy Greor – Carbon (50HZ)
  - Barbara Griffin – Love Not War (Annie Crummer)
  - Simon Holloway & Shane Mason – K'Lee (K'Lee)
- Best Dance Album: Salmonella Dub – Outside The Dubplates
  - Rhombus -Bass Player
  - Subware – Subware
- Best Country Album: not awarded
- Best Jazz Album: Kevin Clark – Once Upon A Song I Flew
  - Twinset – It's A Summer Feeling
  - Matt Penman – The Unquiet
- Best Gospel Album: not awarded
- Best Pacific Island Album (new category): Pacific Soul – Pacific Soul
  - Jamoa Jam – Tama Mai Le Pasifika
  - Lapi Mariner – Just Me
- Best Roots Music Album (new category): Trinity Roots – True
  - Te Vaka – Nukukehe
  - Darren Watson – King Size
- Best Classical Album: New Zealand Symphony Orchestra – Douglas Lilburn: The Three Symphonies
  - New Zealand Symphony Orchestra -Simon Boccanegra -Giuseppe V
  - New Zealand String Quartet – Beethoven Rasumovsky Quartet
- Songwriter of the Year: Goodshirt – Sophie
  - Che Fu – Misty Frequencies
  - Nesian Mystik – It's On
- Best Cover Design: Campbell Hooper-Johnson – 'Flock: The Best Of The Mutton Birds
  - Damian Alexander – Blindspott (Blindspott)
  - Spencer Levine – Trade Secrets (Dubious Brothers)
- New Zealand Radio Programmer of the Year: Andi Dawkins – More FM Christchurch
  - Andrew Szusterman – Channel Z
  - John Budge – Classic Hits
  - Manu Taylor – Mai FM
- Lifetime Achievement Award (new category): Dylan Taite

==== Performing arts ====
- Benny Award presented by the Variety Artists Club of New Zealand to Jim Joll.

=== Television ===
- 3 October: TV4 is replaced by C4.

=== Film ===
- Kombi Nation
- The Last Samurai
- Whale Rider
- 17 December: World premiere of The Lord of the Rings: The Return of the King in Wellington

=== Internet ===
See: NZ Internet History

== Sport ==
=== Athletics ===
- Todd Stevens wins his first national title in the men's marathon, clocking 2:30:09 on 3 May in Rotorua, while Maree Turner claims her first in the women's championship (2:55:40).

=== Basketball ===
- The NBL won by the Wellington Saints who beat the Waikato Titans 97–88 in the final.
- The Women's NBL was won by the Wellington Swish who beat the Waikato Lady Titans 86–82 in the final

=== Horse racing ===
==== Harness racing ====
- New Zealand Trotting Cup – Just an Excuse
- Auckland Trotting Cup – Elsu
- New Zealand Free For All – Jack Cade

=== Motor racing ===
- 12 October – Scott Dixon wins the 2003 Indy Racing League Championship

=== Netball ===
- The 11th Netball World Championships were held in Kingston, Jamaica. New Zealand won, beating Australia in the final.

=== Rugby union ===
- 11 October – Auckland defeat Canterbury to win the Ranfurly Shield, ending Canterbury's run of 23 defences.
- 11 October – New Zealand beat Italy (70–7) in pool D of the Rugby World Cup
- 17 October – New Zealand beat Canada (68–6) in pool D of the Rugby World Cup
- 24 October – New Zealand beat Tonga (91–7) in pool D of the Rugby World Cup
- 2 November – New Zealand beat Wales (53–37) in pool D of the Rugby World Cup, finishing top of pool D
- 8 November – New Zealand beat South Africa (29–9) in the first quarter-final of the Rugby World Cup
- 15 November – New Zealand lose to Australia (10–22) in the first semi-final of the Rugby World Cup
- 20 November – Playoff: (Loser SF1 v Loser SF2) New Zealand beat France (40–13) to take 3rd place in the Rugby World Cup

=== Rugby league ===
- Bartercard Cup won by Canterbury Bulls
- The New Zealand Warriors finished 6th (of 15 teams) in the minor premiership, qualifying for the finals series, where they won two games before losing the preliminary final to minor premieres the Penrith Panthers.

=== Shooting ===
- Ballinger Belt –
  - Ian Shaw (United Kingdom)
  - Ross Geange (Masterton), fourth, top New Zealander

=== Soccer ===
- New Zealand National Soccer League won by Miramar Rangers
- The Chatham Cup is won by University-Mount Wellington who beat Melville United 3–1 in the final.

=== Yachting ===
- 19 January – Swiss yacht Alinghi, skippered by Russell Coutts, beats Oracle BMW Racing 4–1 to win the Louis Vuitton Cup off Auckland and goes on to challenge Team New Zealand for the 2003 America's Cup.
- 2 March – Alinghi, skippered by Russell Coutts, beats Team New Zealand boat New Zealand skippered by Dean Barker 5–0 to win the 2003 America's Cup

== Births ==
=== January–March ===
- 3 January – Harry Godfrey, rugby union player
- 8 January – Sosefo Fifita, rugby league player
- 9 January – Ali Leiataua, rugby league player
- 13 January – Prudence Fowler, cyclist
- 27 January – Brianna Edwards, association footballer
- 2 February – Ajay Faleafaga, rugby union player
- 5 February – Santo Taumata, rugby union player
- 13 February – Flora Devonshire, cricketer
- 18 February – Jeremiah Nanai, rugby league player
- 24 February – Jackson Manuel, association footballer
- 13 March – Patricia Maliepo, rugby union player
- 19 March – Caleb Tangitau, rugby union player
- 23 March – Davvy Moale, rugby league player
- 27 March – Kees Sims, association footballer
- 29 March – Macca Springer, rugby union player

=== April–June ===
- 4 April – Siua Wong, rugby league player
- 17 April – Taha Kemara, rugby union player
- 19 April – April Ngatupuna, rugby union and rugby league player
- 22 April – Che Clark, rugby union player
- 23 April – Benjamin Culhane, field hockey player
- 25 April – Deine Mariner, rugby league player
- 3 May – Kaelin Nguyen, association footballer
- 8 May – Kyren Taumoefolau, rugby union player
- 12 May – Kelsey Teneti, rugby union player
- 23 May – Noah Hotham, rugby union player
- 25 May – Deine Mariner, rugby league player
- 30 May – Siale Lauaki, rugby union player
- 8 June – Tahlor Cahill, rugby union player
- 17 June – Tiana Raftstrand-Smith, rugby league player
- 25 June
  - Finn Hurley, rugby union player
  - Jack Taylor, rugby union player

=== July–September ===
- 4 July – Oliver Colloty, footballer
- 15 July – Hannah Cotter, field hockey player
- 20 July – Charlie Morrison, field hockey player
- 28 July – Curtis Heaphy, cricketer
- 10 August – Fin Conchie, association footballer
- 13 August – Cameron Gray, swimmer
- 23 August – Efficient, Thoroughbred racehorse
- 23 September – Finn Surman, association footballer

=== October–December ===
- 3 October – Will Stodart, rugby union player
- 14 October
  - Joshua Rudland, association footballer
  - Jordi Viljoen, rugby union player
- 16 October – Havana Hopman, rhythmic gymnast
- 21 October – Kate Taylor, association footballer
- 29 October – Matt Dibley-Dias, association footballer
- 31 October – Green Birdie, Thoroughbred racehorse
- 17 November – Callum Hedge, racing driving
- 24 November – Charlotte Cleverley-Bisman, face of campaign against meningococcal disease
- 29 November – Muhammad Abbas, cricketer
- 4 December – Ryan Wood, motor racing driver
- 21 December – Kulikefu Finefeuiaki, rugby league player
- 31 December – Erika Fairweather, swimmer

=== Undated ===
- Manaia Nuku, rugby union player
- Stellar Pritchard, poet, LGBT community advocate
- Raymond Tuputupu, rugby union player

== Deaths ==
=== January ===
- 6 January – Hirini Melbourne, composer, singer, writer and academic (born 1949)
- 7 January – Charisma, eventing horse (foaled 1972)
- 8 January – Mac Price, diplomat (born 1948)
- 16 January – Bruce Juddery, journalist (born 1941)
- 20 January – Cleone Rivett-Carnac, athlete (born 1933)
- 21 January
  - James Clark, cricketer (born 1910)
  - Les Lock, racing cyclist (born 1929)
- 22 January – Dylan Taite, drummer, rock music journalist (born 1937)
- 29 January – Bill Sewell, poet (born 1951)
- 30 January – Ron Buchan, lawn bowler (born 1907)

=== February ===
- 1 February – Bill Meates, rugby union player (born 1923)
- 2 February – Stan Cowman, cricket umpire (born 1923)
- 13 February – Bright Williams, last surviving New Zealand-born veteran of World War I (born 1897)
- 22 February – Sir Frank Callaway, music educator and administrator (born 1919)
- 25 February – Marion Robinson, physiologist, nutritionist (born 1923)

=== March ===
- 7 March – Sid Scales, cartoonist (born 1916)
- 19 March – Tori Reid, rugby union player (born 1912)
- 27 March – Edwin Carr, composer (born 1926)

=== April ===
- 5 April – Irihapeti Ramsden, nurse, educator (born 1946)
- 7 April – John Rymer, Anglican cleric (born 1924)
- 8 April – Harry Frazer, rugby union player (born 1916)
- 14 April – John Kent, cartoonist (born 1937)
- 22 April – Ian Marshall, association football player and coach (born 1942)
- 27 April – Albert Richards, athlete (born 1924)
- 29 April – Ron Barclay, politician (born 1914)
- 30 April – Possum Bourne, rally driver (born 1956)

=== May ===
- 5 May – Margaret Dalziel, English literature academic (born 1916)
- 12 May – Stan Lay, athlete (born 1906)
- 24 May
  - Neil Cherry, environmental scientist (born 1946)
  - Kaarene Fitzgerald, advocate for study and treatment of sudden infant death (born 1944)
- 28 May – Phil Holloway, politician (born 1917)
- 29 May
  - Joanna Paul, visual artist, poet, filmmaker (born 1945)
  - Sina Woolcott, artist (born 1907)

=== June ===
- 2 June – Kenneth Maddock, anthropology academic (born 1937)
- 5 June – Alister Abernethy, trade unionist, politician and public servant (born 1920)
- 9 June – Jack Henry, silviculturist and businessman (born 1917)
- 12 June – Monty Monteith, clergyman (born 1904)
- 14 June – Joyce Powell, cricketer (born 1922)
- 15 June – David Holt, association footballer (born 1952)
- 20 June – Thomas Freeman, cricketer (born 1923)

=== July ===
- 6 July – Peter Howden, cricketer (born 1911)
- 13 July – Lin Colling, rugby union player, coach and administrator (born 1946)
- 20 July – Bill Schaefer, field hockey player (born 1925)
- 20 July – David McNee, New Zealand interior designer and television personality (born 1948/1949)
- 21 July – John Davies, athlete (born 1938)
- 24 July – Dame Ella Campbell, botanist (born 1910)
- 25 July – Joan Talbot, fashion designer and retailer (born 1927)
- 30 July – Agnes Ell, cricketer (born 1917)

=== August ===
- 3 August – Joyce Macdonald, swimmer (born 1922)
- c.7 August – Mike Hinge, illustrator and graphic designer (born 1931)
- 8 August – Allan McCready, politician (born 1916)
- 9 August
  - Rex Challies, cricketer (born 1924)
  - Corran McLachlan, chemical engineer, entrepreneur (born 1944)
- 12 August – Alan McLean, cricketer (born 1911)
- 22 August – Dorothea Anne Franchi, pianist, harpist, music educator and composer (born 1920)
- 27 August – Mick Connelly, politician (born 1916)

=== September ===
- 2 September – Dame Ann Ballin, clinical psychologist, victims' rights advocate and disabilities campaigner (born 1932)
- 5 September – Sir Richard Harrison, politician (born 1921)
- 7 September
  - David Spence, mathematician (born 1926)
  - Merv Wellington, politician (born 1940)
- 11 September – Frances King, cricketer (born 1980)
- 15 September – Anthony Treadwell, architect (born 1922)
- 19 September
  - Max Brown, writer (born 1916)
  - Adrian Shelford, rugby league player (born 1964)
- 23 September – Dennis McEldowney, writer and editor (born 1926)
- 25 September – Bill Wolfgramm, musician (born 1925)

=== October ===
- 3 October
  - Lyall Barry, swimmer (born 1926)
  - Savenaca Siwatibau, Fijian public servant and university administrator (born 1940)
- 18 October – Frank O'Flynn, politician (born 1918)
- 31 October – Lindsay Weir, cricketer (born 1908)

=== November ===
- 5 November – Muriel Boswell, netball player (born 1915)
- 12 November – Cameron Duncan, filmmaker (born 1986)
- 15 November – Tom Kneebone, cabaret performer and actor (born 1932)
- 16 November – Theo Allen, athlete (born 1914)
- 23 November – Nick Carter, cyclist (born 1924)
- 24 November – Millie Khan, lawn bowler (born 1938)
- 26 November – Brian Wybourne, physics academic (born 1935)

=== December ===
- 17 December – James Coe, artist, art teacher, industrial designer (born 1917)
- 25 December – Patrick O'Farrell, history academic (born 1933)

== See also ==
- History of New Zealand
- List of years in New Zealand
- Military history of New Zealand
- Timeline of New Zealand history
- Timeline of New Zealand's links with Antarctica
- Timeline of the New Zealand environment
