= 2026 Kent meningitis outbreak =

Disease outbreak in Kent, England and Paris, France

- Locations and institutions associated with public health response to confirmed cases. Legend: Key (click through to descriptions for sources): Nightclub; University; School
- Disease: Meningococcal disease
- Pathogen: Neisseria meningitidis
- Location: Canterbury, Kent, England
- First reported: 15 March 2026
- Date: 11 March 2026 – 16 March 2026
- Type: Bacterial cluster
- Confirmed cases: 21
- Hospitalised cases: 21
- Deaths: 2

On 11 March 2026, an outbreak of meningitis B began in Kent, England. It is believed that the outbreak started in a nightclub in Canterbury. As of 31 March, a total of 21 cases had been reported which were linked to Neisseria meningitidis serotype B. Many of the cases have been associated with students attending local educational institutions, including the University of Kent.

== Background ==
Invasive meningococcal disease is a rare disease caused by Neisseria meningitidis, an organism that is often carried asymptomatically. It is a major cause of meningitis and septicaemia. It has a rapid progression and a case fatality rate of 8–15%. The highest incidence is in babies under the age of 1 and young adults between the ages 15 to 24. The disease is rare in England, with 378 cases and 31 deaths being confirmed in the 2024–25, compared to 340 cases in 2023–24.

Whilst a relevant meningococcal vaccine is part of the National Health Service's childhood vaccination schedule, the MenB vaccine has only been offered since 2015, meaning all people born prior to this are unlikely to have received it. Additionally, the vaccine is given to infants, and protection from the vaccine is short and does not last past early childhood.

Meningococcal disease requires close and prolonged contact to spread. Usually this is from living in the same household but sometimes this is from kissing, or sharing vapes (saliva contact), or sneezing (respiratory droplet contact). Guidance exists for the public health management of the condition in the United Kingdom which emphasises the importance in high risk contacts of antibiotic prophylaxis.

== Outbreak ==
=== Initial event ===
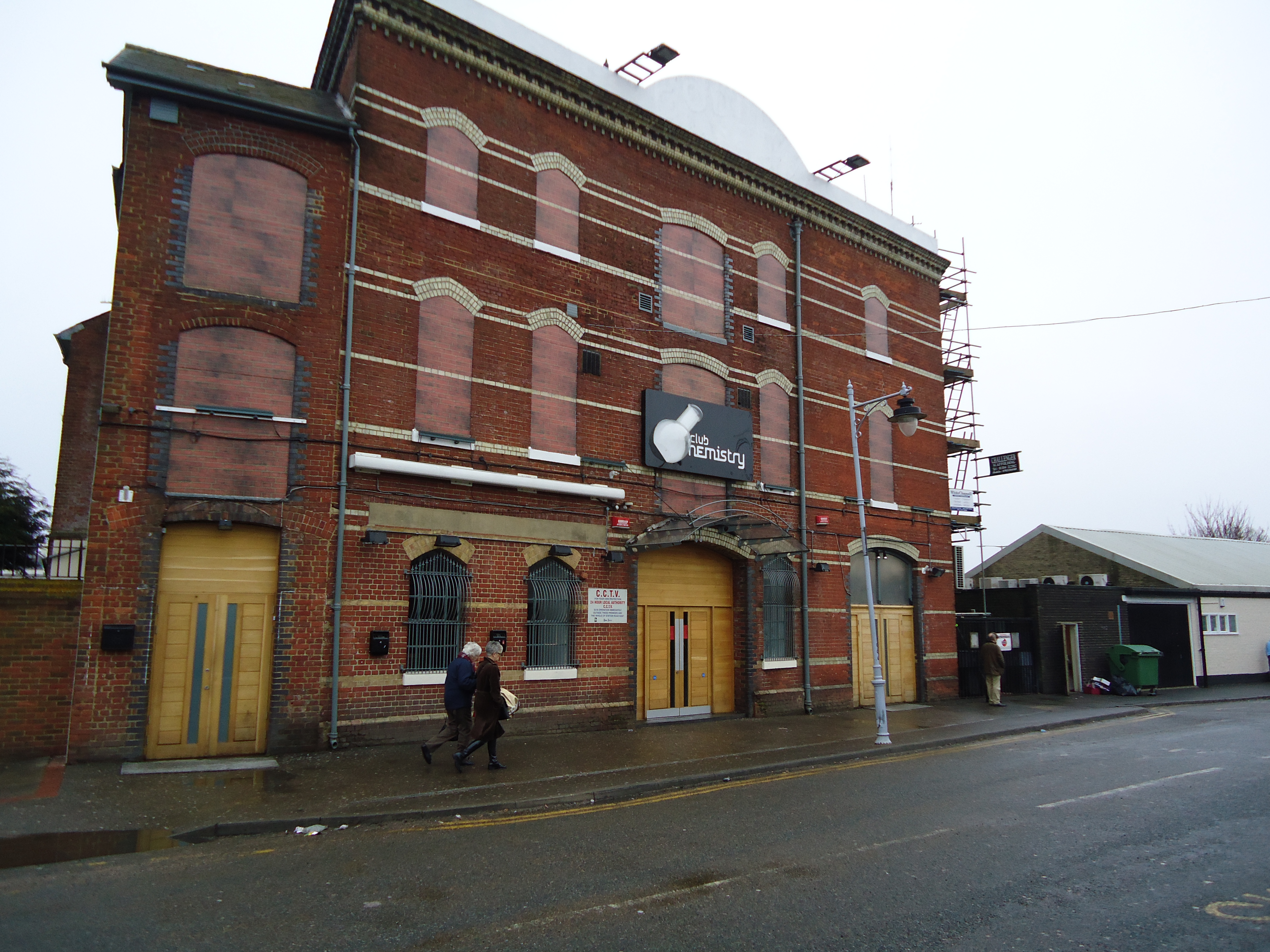
Club Chemistry, seen in December 2010.

Between 5 and 7 March 2026, a superspreading event (SSEV) of meningococcal disease occurred at Club Chemistry in Canterbury, Kent. During the period it is estimated that there were 4,800 attendees, with most being students of the nearby University of Kent and Canterbury Christ Church University.

=== Outbreak ===
On the evening of 11 March 2026, a case of meningitis presented in East Kent, being reported two days later on 13 March. On 12 March, health authorities in France were notified of a case of invasive meningococcal disease (IMD) in an exchange student from the Paris region returning to the country from the University of Kent. According to Wes Streeting, the secretary of state for health and social care, British authorities were not informed until 14 March. The UK Health Security Agency (UKHSA) was first notified of the by then, initial laboratory confirmed case of meningitis on 13 March by East Kent Hospitals University NHS Foundation Trust; the persons in the cases had lived at different addresses hence an outbreak was not initially declared, as officials could not find a link between the cases.

On 14 March, 3 students at the university were taken to hospital and the UKHSA was notified of further cases the following morning.

On 15 March, the UKHSA issued a statement reporting an outbreak of IMD in the Canterbury area, focused on the University of Kent's main campus there. The statement added that 13 cases had been reported since 13 March and that the specific strain of the disease had not yet been identified, whilst antibiotics were being arranged for some students. The same day, it was reported that two young people had died, one of whom was a student at the university, whilst a further 11 were "seriously ill" in hospital. The UKHSA said they were informing over 30,000 students, staff and their families of the situation.

On 16 March, the second death of the outbreak was named as a Year 13 student at Queen Elizabeth's Grammar School in Faversham, whilst a pupil from the Simon Langton Grammar School for Boys in Canterbury and another from The Norton Knatchbull School in Ashford were confirmed to be in hospital. The outbreak is thought to be linked to an event at a nightclub in Canterbury, which was then closed until further notice. University students were seen queueing to receive antibiotics in scenes reminiscent of the COVID-19 pandemic, whilst all in-person assessments and exams were cancelled for that week.

On 17 March, the number of clinical cases rose by two to 15, with the UKHSA saying four of these had been confirmed as meningitis B, whilst both the Canterbury Academy and Highworth Grammar School in Ashford said one of their students was in hospital. Streeting described the outbreak as "unprecedented" during a statement at the House of Commons, adding that the government will begin a "targeted vaccination programme" for around 5,000 students living in halls of residence at the university. Supplies of the MenB vaccine at private pharmacies and clinics were reported to be running low as many "increasingly desperate" parents tried to vaccinate their children.

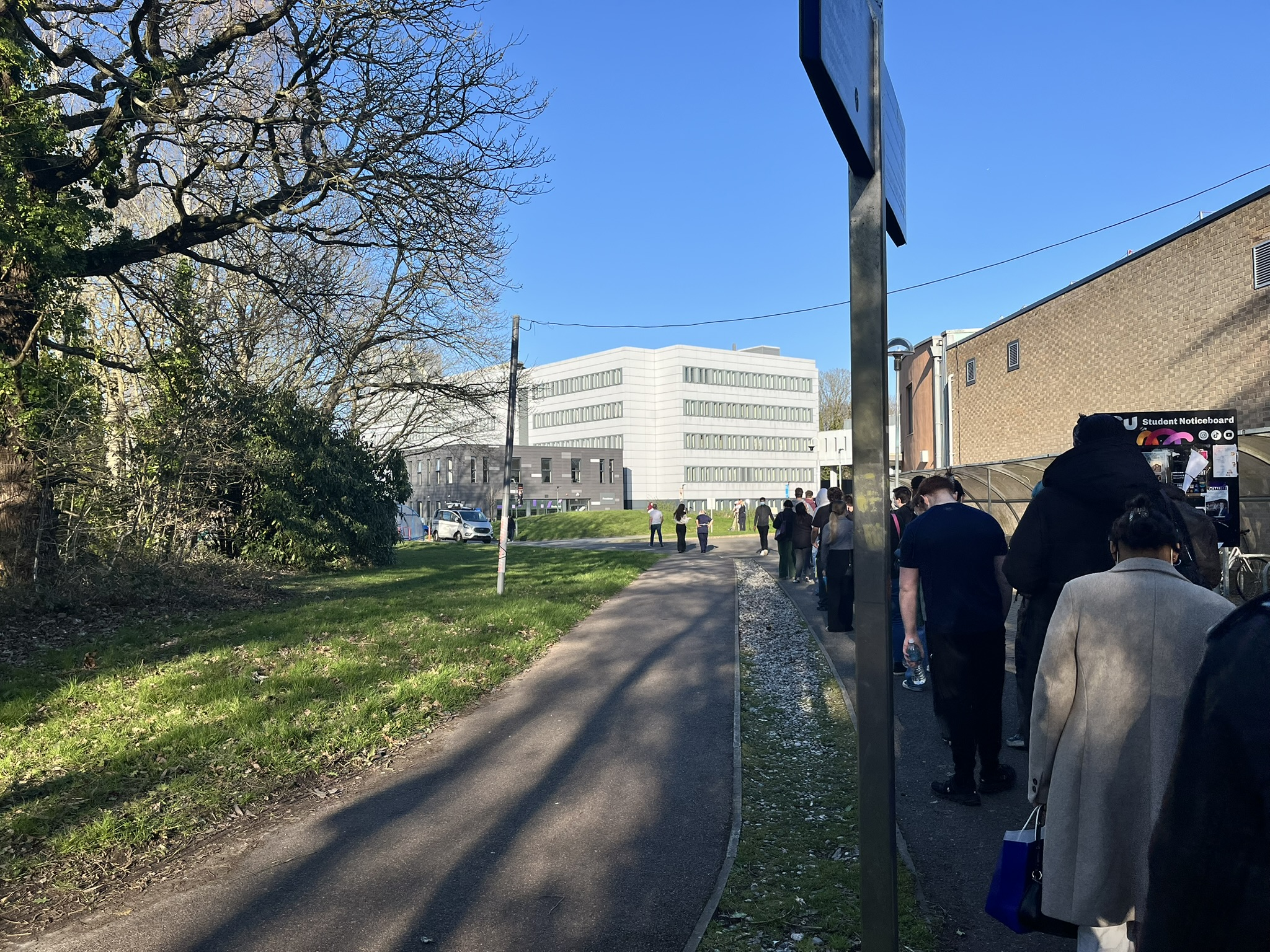
Students queueing for the MenB vaccine at the University of Kent on 18 March

On 18 March, the UKHSA issued a rare public health alert as the number of cases rose to 20, with a case being confirmed at Canterbury Christ Church University. Of these 20, nine had been confirmed whilst the other 11 were under investigation, including a Kent resident who presented to a hospital in London; a baby from Folkestone was also confirmed with the infection, however this case was not linked to the outbreak.

On 19 March, the UKHSA reported that the number of cases linked to the outbreak had risen to 27, including two deaths. Of these, a portion were laboratory-confirmed including one involving a student who attended a London college while others remained under investigation as probable or linked cases.

On 20 March, the UKHSA announced that genetic analysis suggested the organism was a good match to the vaccine being used in Kent and the number of confirmed cases was 18, with 11 notifications remaining under investigation. The next day the UKHSA reported no change in the number under investigation, with an increase to 23 confirmed laboratory cases.

On 22 March, the UKHSA decreased the number of cases associated with the Kent outbreak to 29, with 20 being laboratory confirmed. A case was associated with student attendance at Canterbury College, Kent.

On 24 March, the UKHSA decreased the number of cases associated with the Kent outbreak to 23, with 20 being laboratory confirmed, and a technical briefing was published. This revealed that the bacterial strain had distinct features in its genome but was closely related to strains already circulating in the UK, and should be both susceptible to common antibiotics and covered by the two MenB vaccines licensed in the UK.

Later more complete genomic studies found that the strain had a hyperinvasive genotype related to prior exchange of genetic material with other common bacteria found in the human throat.

== Response ==
After they were informed of the event and outbreak, Club Chemistry announced it would close until the outbreak ended. The club said that the UK Health Security Agency informed the club of the incident via Instagram direct messages. On 19 March 2026 the UKHSA increased eligibility for vaccination to all who had been offered chemoprophylaxis during the outbreak to date, and widened the chemoprophylaxis eligibility criteria to include those who attended Club Chemistry from the 5 March until it closed on 15 March and more school pupils. As of 20 March 2026, over 10,500 doses of antibiotics and 4,500 vaccinations had been given. Vaccination was extended to include Year 11s in schools, where the vaccination offer has already been made, on 24 March.

On 25 March 2026 a health expert said the delay in initial reporting of the initial suspected case of meningitis in the outbreak was "indefensible".

By 28 March 2026 no further new cases had been reported for a week. "Multiple potentially significant" mutations that may have changed the meningococcal bacterium's behaviour had been reported, but it was unknown how widespread this variant was. It was also unknown if teenagers had built up less immunity to bacteria perhaps because of the period of isolation they had had during the COVID-19 pandemic. The club setting did not appear that exceptional as a packed nightclub with sharing drinks and vapes happens up and down the country "every week".

== See also ==
- Meningococcal disease
- Neisseria meningitidis
