= 2013 Princeton meningitis outbreak =

Meningitis B outbreak at Princeton University

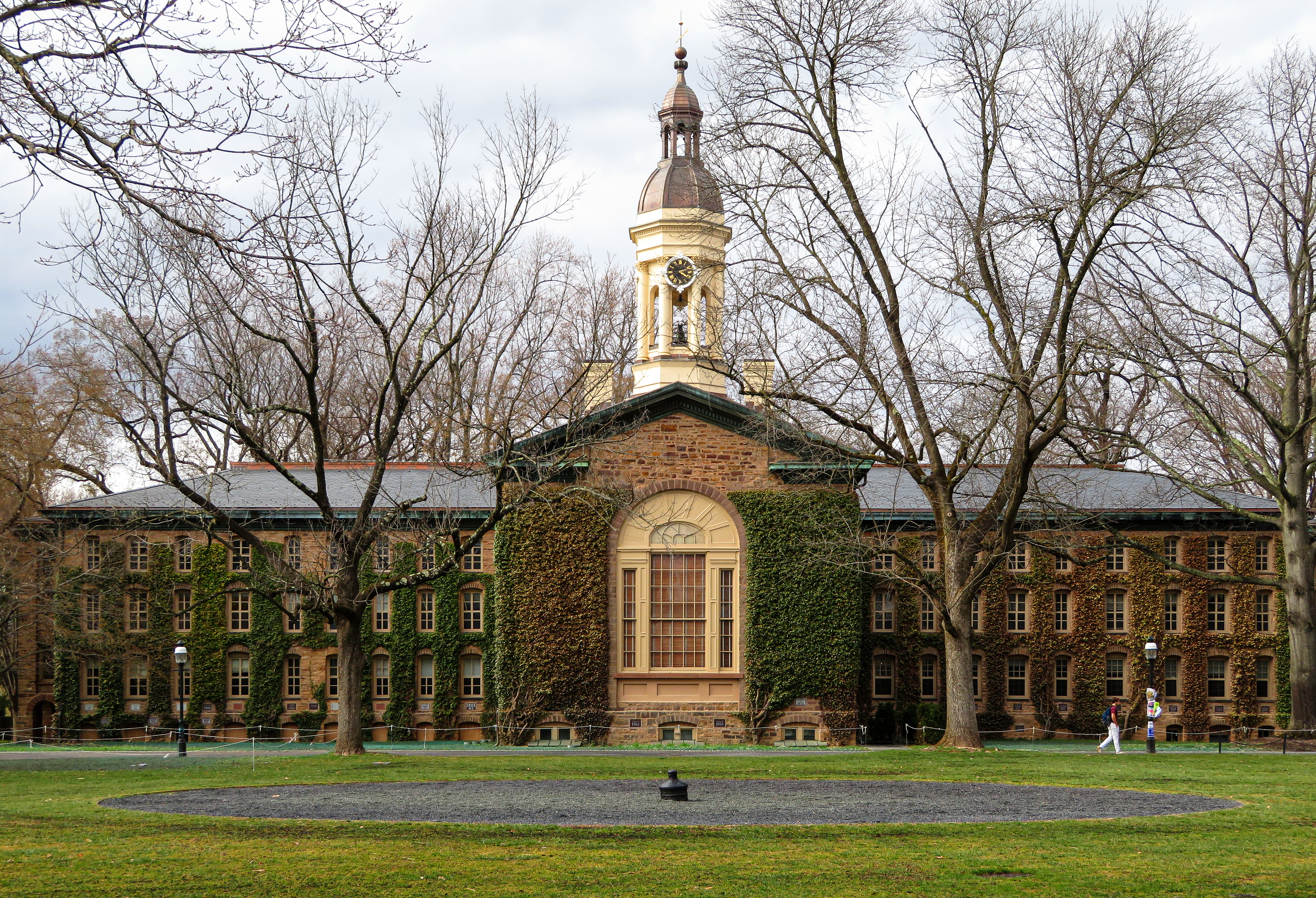
- Princeton University, the location of the outbreak
- Disease: Meningococcal disease
- Pathogen: Neisseria meningitidis serotype B
- Location: Princeton, New Jersey
- Dates: March 2013 – March 2015
- Confirmed cases: 9
- Deaths: 1
- Vaccinations: Meningitis B vaccine

In 2013, an outbreak of meningitis B occurred at Princeton University in Princeton, New Jersey, United States. A total of nine cases were reported, including one death in a student from Drexel University in Philadelphia, Pennsylvania, who was in contact with the Princeton cases. The first case was reported on March 25, 2013, in a student returning from spring break; the third case, confirmed on May 6, led the New Jersey Department of Health to declare the incident as an "official cluster" to Princeton administrators, who then began a campus-wide hygiene campaign to prevent further cases. The last case on the Princeton campus was reported in November 2013. The outbreak was officially declared over by March 2015.

Meningitis B is a form of meningococcal disease caused by serotype B of the Neisseria meningitidis bacteria, which causes severe illness including meningitis and sepsis. Prior to the outbreak, a quadrivalent meningococcal vaccine was available for four other serotypes of the disease (A, C, W-135, and Y) in the U.S., and was required by the state health department for college students. However, no vaccine providing protection against serogroup B had been licensed by the Food and Drug Administration for use in the U.S. In response to the outbreak, the FDA approved the emergency importation of Bexsero, a meningitis B vaccine approved in the E.U., for a successful mass vaccination campaign at the university. The Princeton outbreak eventually led the FDA to approve two variants of meningitis B vaccine nationwide.

== Background ==
Meningococcal disease is a rare but serious infection caused by Neisseria meningitidis, a Gram-negative strain of bacteria. Neisseria meningitidis colonizes the respiratory tract of many individuals as a commensal organism, but pathogenic strains can invade the bloodstream, causing severe meningitis (inflammation of the meninges, the membranes surrounding the brain and spinal cord) and/or sepsis. Initial symptoms can be mild, including fever and neck stiffness, but can rapidly deteriorate into septic shock and death within hours. The overall case fatality rate is around 10%, with roughly 20% of survivors suffering permanent neurological damage. The disease is transmitted predominantly by exposure to respiratory droplets or saliva from an infected person, such as by sharing utensils, coughing, or kissing. Around 98% of cases of meningococcal disease are sporadic, but outbreaks remain a concern in college dormitories, where students are in close congregation and tend to engage in higher-risk behaviors.

Twelve serotypes of Neisseria meningitidis exist, but only six can cause meningococcal disease: A, B, C, W-135, X, and Y. In 2005, the New Jersey Department of Health began to require the quadrivalent ACWY vaccine for all matriculating students at all colleges and universities; the quadrivalent vaccine successfully mitigated cases of meningococcal disease when implemented. However, until 2013, no vaccine against group B meningococcal disease had been licensed in the United States. Meningococcal disease is relatively rare in the developed world: in 2012, only 160 cases of meningitis B were reported nationwide. However, between 2005 and 2011, serogroup B accounted for 60% of cases in patients under five and a third of cases overall.

== Outbreak ==
The first case of meningitis B at Princeton University was reported on March 25, 2013, involving a student who had recently returned from spring break; the university health department concluded the student had been infected over break while they were off-campus. A second case was reported in a prospective student who spent three days on campus in undergraduate accommodation. In early May, a third student reported with symptoms of meningitis B and was hospitalized. The following day, the New Jersey Department of Health declared that all three cases were linked as a cluster, and the university informed students and faculty via email. The fourth case, diagnosed on May 20, led the Department of Health to declare an outbreak of meningitis B.

The outbreak was officially announced as ended on March 13, 2015.

== Response ==
In August 2013, in response to the outbreak, the CDC submitted a new drug request to the FDA for the importation of Bexsero, a two-dose meningitis B vaccine which was already approved for use in the European Union. The FDA provided emergency approval that December, and vaccination clinics opened at the university in February 2014. The school initiated an intense campaign to encourage students, especially the undergraduate population. By the end of 2014, 96% of undergraduate students at Princeton had received both doses of the vaccine. Since 2013, the FDA has licensed Bexsero along with Trumemba, a three-dose vaccine. The university recommends all students who live in student residences receive a meningococcal B vaccine in addition to the meningitis ACWY vaccine.
