= Meningitis B =

Bacterial diseases

Meningitis B is a type of meningococcal disease caused by serotype B of the Neisseria meningitidis bacteria. Despite its name, not all meningococcal infections due to serotype B infection involve meningitis; many also cause sepsis or other complications. Collectively, they are referred to as Meningococcal Group B diseases, or MenB.

== Epidemiology ==
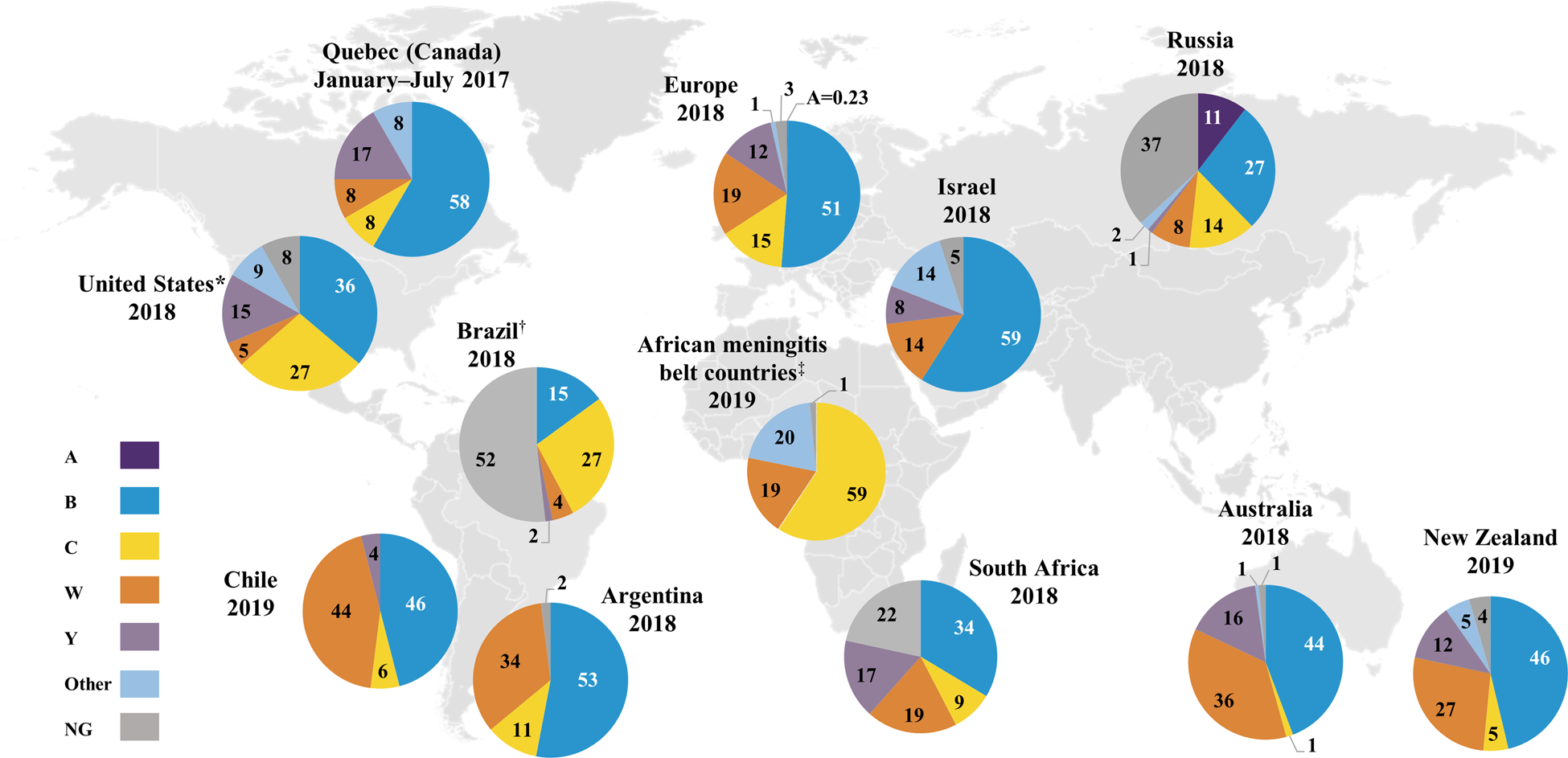
Percentage serogroup distribution of invasive meningococcal disease worldwide from 2017 to 2019.

Serogroup B is the most common cause of meningococcal disease in countries that routinely vaccinate against serotypes A, C, W, and Y. However, overall prevalence of meningococcal disease is low. From 2000 to 2015, only 2 countries had prevalence of B-MD greater than 2/100,000 with most countries reporting incidence of less than 1/100,000. The case fatality rate is high, ranging from 10%-20% even after aggressive treatment with antibiotics. Three hyper-invasive genotypes are responsible for most outbreaks. Asymptomatic carriage of serotype B bacteria in the nasopharyngneal passage is common.

== MenB vaccines ==
Vaccines against Meningococcal Group B bacteria are commonly called MenB vaccines.

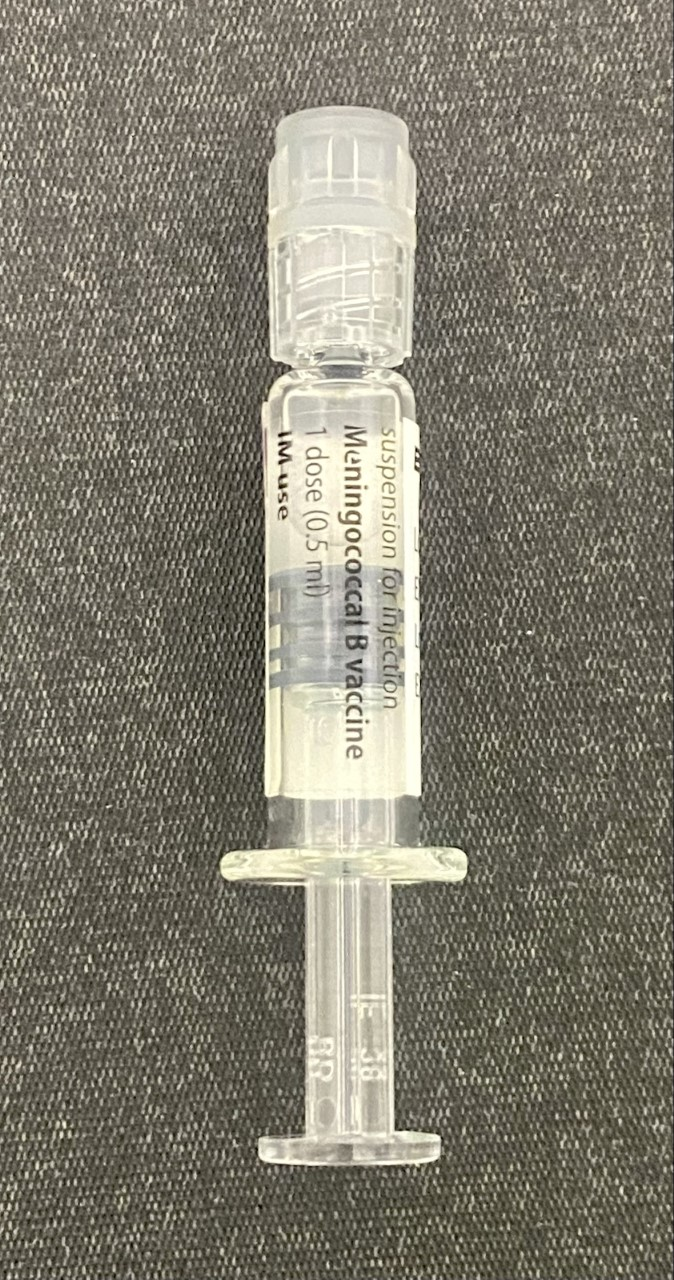
Meningococcal B vaccine

There are two licensed vaccines specifically against serotype B meningococcal disease widely available; Bexsero (GSK) 4-component MenB vaccine (4CMenB) and Trumenba (Pfizer), a bivalent factor H binding protein vaccine (MenB-FHbp). In the UK and Australia, Bexsero is approved for ages 2 months to 50 years; in the UK and Australia, it is given routinely as part of childhood vaccines as infants are the group at greatest risk from meningitis B. The protection offered is short and does not last past early childhood. In the US, both Bexsero and Trumenba are only approved for ages 10–25 and only given to certain high risk groups.

There are additionally two pentavalent vaccines available targeting serogroups A, B, C, W, and Y: Penbraya was approved for use in the United States in October 2023. It combines the vaccines Trumenba and Nimenrix. Penbraya was authorized for medical use in the European Union in November 2024. It is approved for use in individuals 10 through 25 years of age.

Penmenvy was approved for use in the United States in February 2025. Penmenvy is approved for use in people aged 10 through 25 years of age.

== Vaccine development and outbreaks ==
Historically, MenB vaccines were difficult to produce, and required a different approach from vaccines against other serotypes. Whereas effective polysaccharide vaccines have been produced against types A, C, W-135, and Y, the capsular polysaccharide on the type B bacterium is too similar to human neural adhesion molecules to be a useful target.

Several "serogroup B" vaccines have been produced. Strictly speaking, these are not "serogroup B" vaccines, as they do not aim to produce antibodies to the group B antigen: it would be more accurate to describe them as serogroup-independent vaccines, as they employ different antigenic components of the organism; indeed, some of the antigens are common to different Neisseria species.

A vaccine for serogroup B was developed in Cuba in response to a large outbreak of meningitis B during the 1980s. This vaccine was based on artificially produced outer membrane vesicles of the bacterium. The VA-MENGOC-BC vaccine proved safe and effective in randomized double-blind studies, but it was granted a licence only for research purposes in the United States as political differences limited cooperation between the two countries.

Due to a similarly high prevalence of B-serotype meningitis in Norway between 1974 and 1988, Norwegian health authorities developed a vaccine specifically designed for Norwegian children and adolescents. Clinical trials were discontinued after the vaccine was shown to cover only slightly more than 50% of all cases. Furthermore, lawsuits for damages were filed against the State of Norway by persons affected by serious adverse reactions. Information that the health authorities obtained during the vaccine development was subsequently passed on to Chiron (now GlaxoSmithKline), who later developed a similar vaccine, MeNZB, for New Zealand.

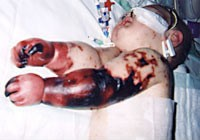
Charlotte Cleverley-Bisman, showing necrosis (tissue death) on arms. Her case brought widespread publicity to the B-MD epidemic in New Zealand, leading to a successful vaccination campaign with MeNZB.

An outbreak in New Zealand beginning in 1991 and lasting until 2006 resulted in 239 deaths, mostly among young children. Of the 5,900 cases, around 20% would suffer some degree of disability. From 2002-2004, the New Zealand Ministry of Health fast-tracked the development of a new vaccine against Meningococcal B, MeNZB. In 2004, the case of Charlotte Cleverley-Bisman became the public face of the disease. The vaccine was approved in 2004 and the vaccination program ran until 2011. The programme was highly successful; in 2006 there were around 300 cases, but by 2010 this had dropped to 30.

A new MenB vaccine was approved for use in Europe in January 2013. Following a positive recommendation from the European Union's Committee for Medicinal Products for Human Use, Bexsero, produced by Novartis, received a licence from the European Commission. However, deployment in individual EU member countries depends on decisions by national governments. As of 2026, Austria, Czechia, Germany, Greece, Hungary, Ireland, Italy, Lithuania, Luxembourg, Malta, Portugal, and Spain routinely vaccinate against MenB.

In July 2013, the United Kingdom's Joint Committee on Vaccination and Immunisation (JCVI) initially issued an interim position statement recommending against the adoption of Bexsero as part of a routine meningococcal B immunisation program, on the grounds of cost-effectiveness. In 2014, the prevalence of B-MD in infants in the UK was approximately 10/100,000 infants. The JCVI decision was reverted in favor of Bexsero vaccination in March 2014. In March 2015 the UK government announced that they had reached agreement with GlaxoSmithKline who had taken over Novartis's vaccines business, and that Bexsero would be introduced into the UK routine immunization schedule later in 2015.

In November 2013, in response to an outbreak of B-serotype meningitis on the campus of Princeton University, the acting head of the Centers for Disease Control and Prevention (CDC) meningitis and vaccine-preventable diseases branch told NBC News that they had authorized emergency importation of Bexsero to stop the outbreak. Bexsero was subsequently approved by the FDA in February 2015 for use in individuals 10 through 25 years of age. In October 2014, Trumenba, a serogroup B vaccine produced by Pfizer, was approved by the FDA for use in individuals 10 through 25 years of age.

In March 2026, there was an outbreak of meningitis B amongst college and university students in the UK, resulting in 2 deaths. The UK health security agency provided prophylactic antibiotics and vaccinations to students.
