= Nuko Hifo =

Tongan rugby league footballer

Nuku Hifo
Personal information
- Born: Tonga

Playing information
- Position: Halfback, Lock
Representative
Years	Team	Pld	T	G	FG	P
2000	Tonga	1	0	0	0	0
- Source: RLP

Nuku Hifo is a Tongan rugby league footballer who represented Tonga national rugby league team at the 2000 World Cup.

== Early years ==
Hifo attended St. Paul's College in New Zealand.

== Playing career ==
Hifo represented Tonga in the 2000 World Cup. At the time he was playing for Griffith in the Group 20 competition.

In 2008 Hifo was part of the Australian squad in the 2008 Student World Cup. Earlier that year he had played for the Queensland University side. Hifo attended Bond University. That year he also played for the Burleigh Bears in the FOGS Cup.

In 2009 he played for the Southern Kookaburras in the Queensland Rugby League's 'A' Grade State Carnival.
