= St Paul's College, Auckland =

School in Auckland, New Zealand

St Pauls College, Auckland
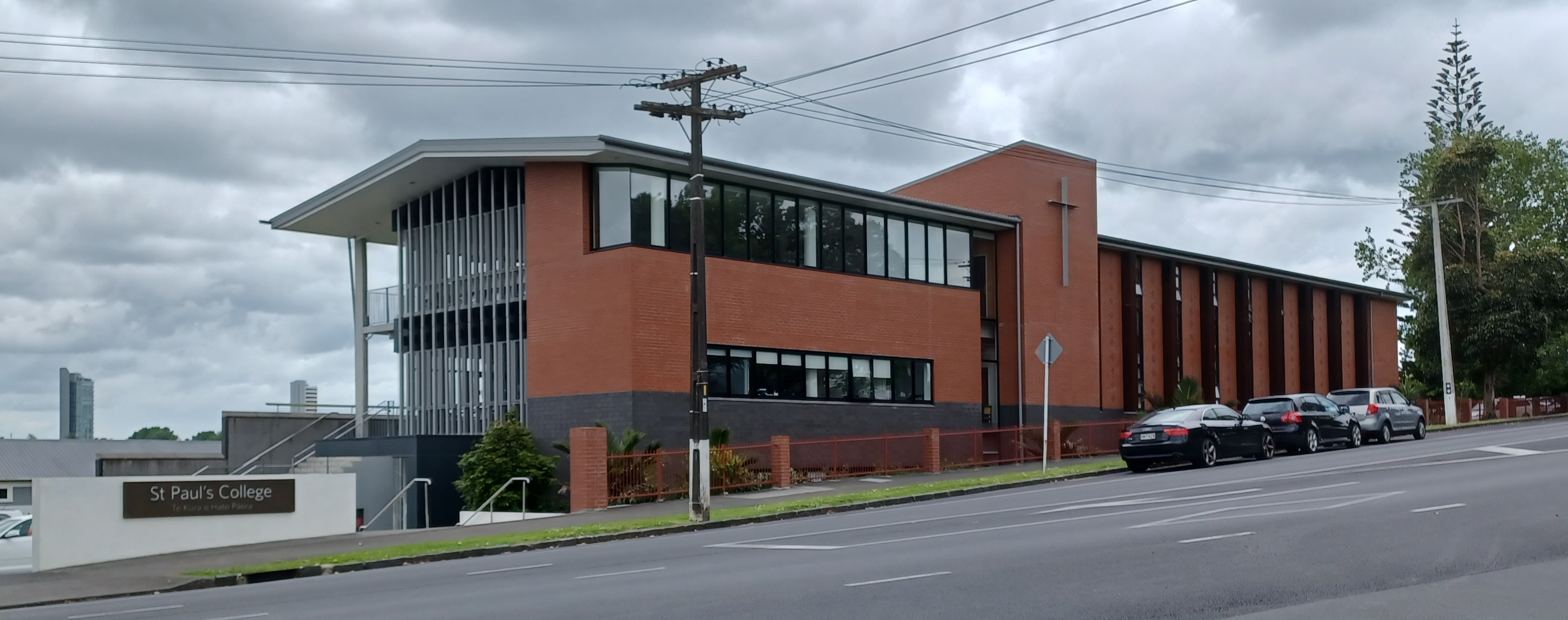

Location
- 183 Richmond Road, Ponsonby, Auckland; 36.8542°S 174.7373°E

Information
- Type: Integrated Catholic Boys Secondary (Year 7–13)
- Motto: Confortare Esto Vir — take courage , be a man
- Established: 1955; 71 years ago (original school founded in 1903)
- Ministry of Education Institution no.: 51
- Principal: Keith Simento
- Enrolment: 395 (July 2026)
- Socio-economic decile: 2E
- Website: St Pauls College website

St Paul's College is a Catholic secondary school for boys owned by the Marist Brothers and located in the central Auckland suburb of Ponsonby on a spacious 7.3 hectare campus. The Marist Brothers first opened a school on the site (Sacred Heart College) in 1903. St Paul's College (named after the apostle Paul) commenced operations in 1955.

== History ==
=== Marist brothers ===
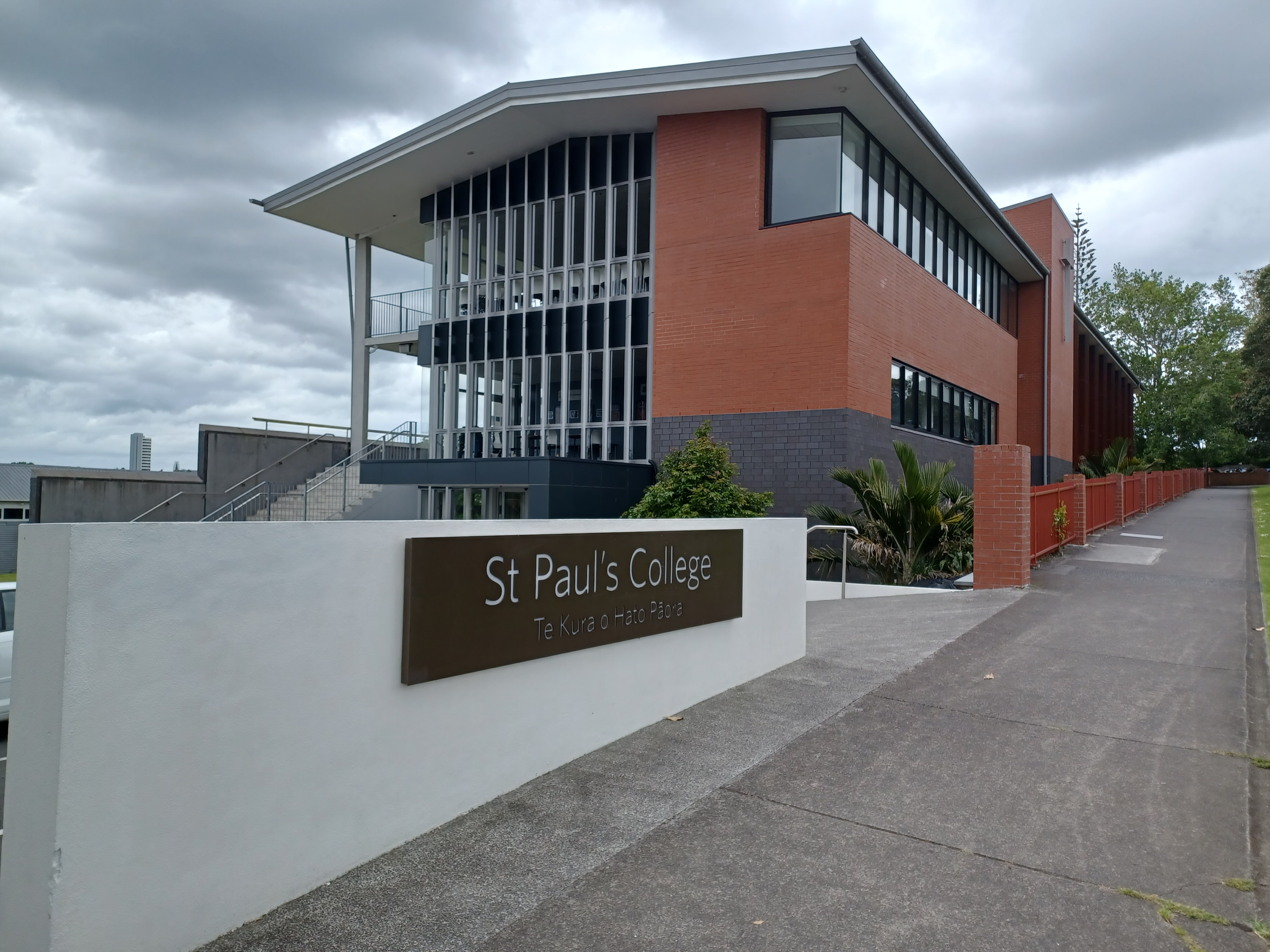
St Paul's College

The Marist Brothers arrived in Auckland in 1885 and began operations on the site of previous schools in Pitt St in the Auckland city centre. In the 1890s they began teaching secondary classes there but it became evident that the Pitt St site was too small and noisy.

=== The campus ===
By 1900 negotiations were underway with Bishop Lenihan who arranged for the brothers to lease part of a block of land of 48 acres (10 hectares) near Cox's Creek in Ponsonby. This land had been gifted to the Diocese of Auckland in 1851 by Hugh Coolahan, an Auckland Catholic businessman. He had come from Ireland and had prospered during the early days of Auckland's commercial development. He had been a member of the building committee for St Patrick's Church (later the cathedral) and was a founding member of the board of St Peter's School in Pitt St. The Marist Brothers leased 7.3 hectares of the land at £30 a year for a 42-year term.

The school, Sacred Heart College, was opened on 21 June 1903. The first building was a large three storied building with a prominent encompassing verandas. It was built from brick resting on concrete foundations. The bricks were coated in white plaster which later became grey with age. This building was a prominent landmark and became the main school building of St Paul's College until it was demolished in 1980.

The site required much development. A gully ran through the middle of the property and the land was very unevenly contoured. Some of the land was farmed by the college. Over time the land was levelled, grassed and drained and other buildings were gradually built. In 1955 the complete campus and buildings was taken over by St Paul's. But by the 21st century, the only Sacred Heart College structures left at St Pauls were a classroom, the old infirmary and a statue of the Sacred Heart. However the campus's well-wooded character testified to its historic character.

It was only on 4 September 1946 that the Marist Brothers had acquired the freehold of the St Paul's College Richmond Rd site. On 14 June 1946 the site was vested in the New Zealand Marist Brothers' Trust Board and there was a small ceremony and Bishop Liston was thanked by the Marist Brothers. One brother later observed, perhaps sardonically, that the Marist Brothers had been paying for the land for over forty years and had effected great improvements.

=== Growth ===
The school operated as St Paul's College after Queen's Birthday 1955 (from Tuesday 7 June) under the same motto "Confortare esto vir". The same traditions were faithfully upheld as they had been for the previous 50 years. Many sons of former students of the Marist Brothers preferred to attend St Paul's in the following years, both because it was centrally located and because their fathers had been educated on the site. The school maintained a substantial roll into the 1970s. On 8 August 1982, when the school was integrated it had a roll of 330 (280 in the secondary section and 50 in the middle or intermediate school), but this was increased in 1998 to a maximum roll of 400. However, with the establishment of other secondary schools in the school's traditional catchment, enrolment numbers declined. Many of the families associated with the school moved out of the local area as the socio-economic character of suburbs adjacent to the school changed although many still sent their sons to St Paul's by bus, mostly from South Auckland. The school was attempting to attract the sons of the new local demographic as well as the college's traditional supporters. In 2015 a 1700 square metre slice of unused school land was sold to fund new class rooms, an administration block and a new middle school was opened in 2018. Because of population intensification of the local central Auckland area and development of the school site, the present school roll was expected to increase substantially over time. The school reached its maximum role of 400 in 2026 and applied to the Crown for the maximum roll to be increased to 500.

== Overview ==
=== Character ===
The college, which became a State-integrated school in 1982, makes full use of its extensive grounds in sporting and other activities. The school offers the standard intermediate and secondary school curriculum leading, for the senior year levels, to the National Certificate of Educational Achievement assessment system (NCEA). The school has good pass rates in NCEA. The college excels in sport, especially Rugby football and in Polynesian and other cultural activities, notably in the annual ASB Polyfest competitions. The Marist Brothers, the proprietors of the school, maintain a small community of non-teaching brothers on the campus to encourage the continuation of the Marist charism.

=== Ethos and academics ===
The school aimed to incorporate students' families in the life of the college and to encourage the spirit of independence and personal responsibility amongst the students. The school roll has grown as the college continues "exhorting students" to "exam success" and "altruistic action." In 2026 some 80% of students identified as Maori or Pasifica. The principal of the college, Keith Simento, stated that the approach of the school was to create a culture where every student believed that they could succeed. "For many students that belief is the biggest challenge. Sometimes they haven't had people telling them that they are capable of achieving great things. At St Pauls, we make that message clear from the beginning". He said that the school greatly emphasised regular attendance and set high standards. he said that this approach had resulted in 90 percent achievement in NCEA level 2, 95 percent in Level 3 and 85 percent gained University Entrance (UE). Simento said that this success "sends a powerful message to our boys. They realise that people believe in them and that they are capable of achieving things they may never have imagined".

== Houses ==
The names and colours of the St Paul's College Houses are:

- Xavier, named for Francis Xavier – red
- Champagnat, named for Marcellin Champagnat – yellow
- Lavalla, named for La Valla-en-Gier where the Marist Brothers were founded — blue
- Aquinas, named for Thomas Aquinas – green

== Headmasters ==
- Br. Brian Wanden (Br Anselm) "Headmaster at St Paul's College for many years"
- Denys Marra (1991 - 2009)
- Mark Rice (2009 - 2016)
- Kieran Fouhy (2016 - 2021)
- Keith Simento (2021–present)

== Notable alumni ==
=== The arts ===
- David Fane – actor
- Malo Luafutu (aka Scribe) – musician
- Brendan Perry – musician, member of group Dead Can Dance
- Feleti Strickson-Pua – professional musician
- Jean-Baptiste Piggin (1953-2019), journalist; scholar of Roman maps and diagrams, especially the 4th-century Tabula Peutingeriana and a 5th-century Latin diagram of biblical history.
- Lemi Ponifasio – director, artist, dancer, designer and choreographer
- Stellar Pritchard (born 2003) is a poet, dancer, artist.

=== Business ===
- Mark Hotchin – company director
- Ron Holland – yacht designer

=== Politics and public service ===
- Dail Jones (born 1944) – lawyer, Member of Parliament (1978–1984 and 2002–2008)
- Tuilaepa Aiono Sailele Malielegaoi (born 14 April 1945) – sixth Prime Minister of Samoa (1998–2021).
- Lautafi Fio Selafi Purcell – Samoan politician and former Cabinet Minister; member of the Human Rights Protection Party.
- Lefau Harry Schuster (born 1965) – Samoan politician and Cabinet Minister; member of the FAST Party.

=== Sports ===
==== Boxing ====
- Duken Holo Tutakitoa-Williams – Commonwealth Games bronze Medal winning professional boxer.

==== Olympians ====
- David Aspin – Wrestling − 1972, 1976
- John Leonard – Canoeing – 1976

==== Cricket ====
- Sebastian Kohlhase – first-class cricketer, sports administrator and businessman

==== Kick-boxing ====
- Jason Suttie – Muay Thai Kingboxing champion player

==== Rugby league ====
- Bunty Afoa – professional rugby league player
- Paki Afu – Parramatta Eels rugby league player
- Mark Elia – New Zealand Rugby League Kiwi
- Maurie Fa'asavalu – Manu Samoa Rugby player, St Helens Rugby League
- Sosaia Feki – NZ Warriors Rugby League Player
- Salesi Foketi - Sydney Roosters Rugby League Player
- Pita Godinet – Auckland Warriors rugby league player
- Mark Graham – rugby league player, former captain of the Kiwis
- Siliva Havili – rugby league player
- Nuko Hifo – professional rugby league player
- Stacey Jones – New Zealand Warriors rugby league player
- Phillip Leuluai Cronulla Sharks
- Sam Lousi – New Zealand Warriors rugby league player
- Sione Lousi – New Zealand Warriors rugby league player
- Tu'u Maori – Papua New Guinea National Rugby League 2008 Rugby League World Cup team, Newtown Jets, Sydney Roosters under 20's, (previously played for Cronulla Sharks, Melbourne Storm, and Richmond Rovers).
- Manu Ma'u – Parramatta Eels rugby league player
- Francis Meli – NZ Warriors and St. Helens rugby league player
- Jirah Momoisea – Parramatta Eels Rugby League Prop/Second Rower
- Siose Muliumu (born 1976) – professional rugby league player; played for Whitehaven, the United States, and the New Zealand Warriors.
- Dane O'Hara – professional rugby league player (Hull)
- Agnatius Paasi – NZ Warriors Rugby League player
- John Palavi – NZ Warriors rugby league player
- Jerome Ropati – New Zealand Warriors rugby league player
- Nafe Seluini – Penrith Panthers rugby league player
- Michael Sio – Auckland Warriors, Toa Samoa Rugby League World Cup 2013
- David Solomona – Bradford Bulls rugby league player
- Shannon Stowers – NZ Warriors Rugby League Player
- Mark Taufua – Newcastle Knights – Cronulla sharks
- Elijah Taylor – Auckland Warriors rugby league player
- Ben Te'o – Brisbane Broncos rugby league player
- Starford To'a – West Tigers rugby league winger/centre/fullback
- Evarn Tuimavave – New Zealand Warriors rugby league player (Prop Forward)
- Christian Tuipulotu – Manly Warringah Sea Eagles Rugby League winger/centre
- Joe Vagana – Auckland Warriors rugby league player
- Nigel Vagana – Auckland Warriors rugby league player
- Daniel Vasau – Rugby league international, represented Tonga at the 2000 World Cup
- Greg Wolfgramm – Rugby league international, represented Tonga at the 2000 World Cup

==== Rugby union ====
- Edwin Cocker New Zealand Rugby Union Sevens Player – Auckland Rugby Union
- Colin Farrell – All Black (1977), Auckland representative (1974–1981)
- Bernie Fraser – All Black rugby union player
- Liaki Moli – Rugby Union player for the Auckland Blues (2012–2014) and the Japanese Sunwolves (2016 – present)
- Isaia Tuifua – Professional Rugby Union player
- Legi Matiu (born 1969) – played for France at lock and number eight (2000) & for the French Barbarians (1998)
- Ben Te'o – Rugby union player for Leinster (European domestic comp) 2014–15, Worcester warriors (English prem) 2016–present (England national and British Irish lions) 2016–present

== Sources ==
- Jenny Carlyon & Diana Morrow, Urban Village: The Story of Ponsonby, Freemans Bay and St Mary's Bay, Random House, Auckland, 2008.
- Pat (Patrick Owen) Gallagher, The Marist Brothers in New Zealand, Fiji & Samoa, 1876–1976, New Zealand Marist Brothers' Trust Board, Tuakau, 1976.
- Matt McEvoy, The Grey Lynn Book: The life and times of New Zealand's most fascinating suburb, Paul Little Books, Auckland, 2016, pp. 149–153 (Chapter 29, "Change of Heart – Saint Paul's College")
- E.R. Simmons, In Cruce Salus, A History of the Diocese of Auckland 1848 – 1980, Catholic Publication Centre, Auckland 1982.
- Tony Waters, Confortare, A History of Sacred Heart College, Auckland 1903 – 2003: a Marist Brothers secondary school, Sacred Heart College, Auckland, 2003.
