= Mark Juddery =

Australian author and journalist (1971–2015)

- Born: Stanford Mark Juddery; 8 March 1971; Canberra, Australia
- Died: 13 January 2015 (aged 43); Canberra, Australia
- Website: web.archive.org/web/20150111223259/http://markjuddery.com/

Stanford Mark Juddery (8 March 1971 – 13 January 2015) was an Australian freelance journalist, author, humorist and columnist for The Canberra Times. His work also appeared in such newspapers as The Australian and The Sydney Morning Herald, as well as a range of magazines including The Bulletin, Empire, Inside Sport, Mad Magazine and Griffith Review. He also wrote comedy sketches for radio and television, as well as several short comedy plays, which he directed and performed worldwide.

== Biography ==
A movie critic and writer for several years, as well as a publicist for the National Film and Sound Archive, Juddery wrote an e-book guide to movie reviewing for Fabjob Books in 2003. Along with movies, popular culture and humor, much of his writing has revealed an interest in Eastern spirituality. At the age of 19, he studied under meditation teacher Sri Chinmoy and consistently meditated.

As well as hundreds of articles, Juddery wrote the books 1975 – Australia's Greatest Year (John Wiley and Sons, 2005), Busted! The 50 Most Overrated Things in History (Random House, 2008) and Best. Times. Ever (Hardie Grant Books, 2014), all for the Australian market. In 2010, Busted! was re-published for the US market by Perigree Books (a division of Penguin) in New York, substantially revised and rewritten by the author, with the new title Overrated: The 50 Most Overhyped Things in History. Several chapters were replaced, some of them because they were on topics unknown to American readers (e.g. Gallipoli).

Juddery lived in Canberra, Australia, where he wrote a popular weekly column for The Canberra Times from 2007. Early in 2014, he was diagnosed with cancer, just as his book Best. Times. Ever was due to be released. "Not only doesn't my cancer make sense, but it isn't even fair," he wrote. "In that way, it reminds me of everyone over the years who has hurt me, everyone who has threatened me, everyone who has tried to control me, everyone who has made me feel scared. I have every intention of fighting those bastards. I have every intention of beating them." He died of cancer on 13 January 2015, aged 43.

He was the son of Bruce Juddery (1941–2003), who was also a journalist for The Canberra Times.

== Bibliography ==
=== Books ===
- Juddery, Mark (2005). 1975 : Australia's greatest year. Milton, Qld.: John Wiley and Sons.
- — (2008). Busted! The 50 most overrated things in history. North Sydney: Bantam.
- — (2010). Overrated! The 50 most overhyped things in history. New York: Perigee. Revision of Busted!.
- — (2014). Best. Times. Ever. Melbourne: Hardie Grant Books.

=== Essays and reporting ===
- Juddery, Mark (4 January 2014). "In like Flynn". The Spectator Australia. 324 (9671): ix.
