= Sebastian Kohlhase =

Samoan cricketer

Personal information
- Full name: Sebastian Winston Kohlhase
- Born: 22 August 1942 (age 84); Aleipata, Western Samoa
- Batting: Left-handed
- Bowling: Right-arm medium
- Role: Bowler

Domestic team information
- Years: Team
- 1963/64: Northern Districts
- 1968/69–1969/70: Auckland

Career statistics
Competition	First-class
Matches	9
Runs scored	107
Batting average	9.72
100s/50s	0/0
Top score	32
Balls bowled	1,112
Wickets	13
Bowling average	32.30
5 wickets in innings	0
10 wickets in match	0
Best bowling	4/47
Catches/stumpings	8/–
- Source: CricketArchive, 13 November 2008

Sebastian Winston Kohlhase (born 22 August 1942) is a former first-class cricketer, and is now a prominent sports administrator and businessman in Samoa.

== Education ==
Kohlhase attended St Paul's College in Auckland, New Zealand.

== Cricket career ==
Kohlhase played first-class cricket in New Zealand in the 1960s. He represented Northern Districts and Auckland as a medium pace bowler in nine matches, taking 13 wickets at an average of 32.30 and scoring 107 runs at an average of 9.72.

== Sports administration ==
Kohlhase is president of the Samoa International Cricket Association and the Samoan English Cricket Association.

His work has been recognised by the International Cricket Council in their annual Development Programme Awards. In the 2002 awards, he was named as volunteer of the year for the East Asia/Pacific region, and he was given the lifetime service award for the region in the 2006 awards.

In 2008, he acted as Chef de Mission for the Samoan team at the Beijing Olympics.

He is also a vice-president of Samoa Softball.
