= Charlotte Cleverley-Bisman =

Quadruple amputee, face of New Zealand meningococcal campaign (born 2003)

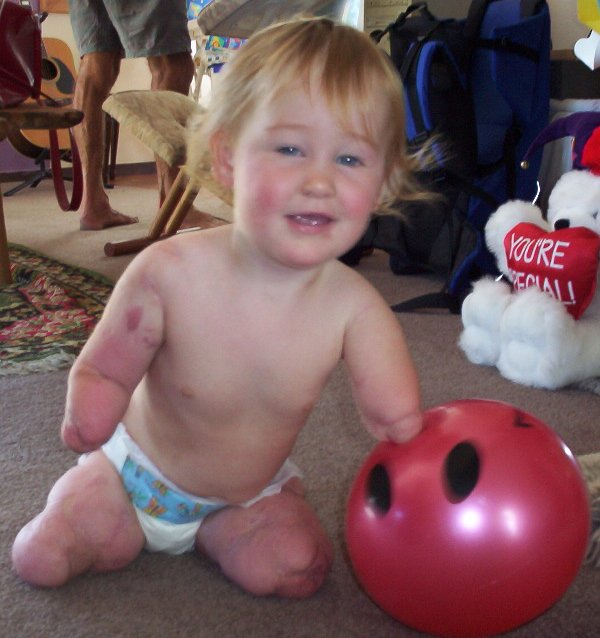
- Cleverley-Bisman at 1–2 years old, c. 2004–2005
- Born: Charlotte Lucy Cleverley-Bisman; 24 November 2003 (age 22); Waiheke Island, New Zealand
- Known for: Face of campaign against meningococcal disease

Charlotte Lucy Cleverley-Bisman (born 24 November 2003) is a New Zealander known as the face of a New Zealand campaign to encourage vaccination against meningococcal disease after contracting and surviving severe meningococcal sepsis. She was nicknamed "Miraculous Baby Charlotte" by her fellow New Zealanders as a result of making headlines worldwide after recuperating from a series of life-threatening complications. She is the daughter of Pam Cleverley and Perry Bisman.

== Meningococcal disease in New Zealand ==
In 2004, New Zealand was in the thirteenth year of an epidemic of meningococcal group B disease, a bacterial infection which can cause meningitis and blood poisoning. Most Western countries have fewer than three cases for every 100,000 people each year, with New Zealand averaging 1.5 before the epidemic started in 1991; in 2001, the worst year of the epidemic in New Zealand, the rate reached 17 per 100,000 people; 5,400 New Zealanders had caught the disease during the epidemic, 220 had died, and 1080 had developed serious disabilities, such as limb amputations or brain damage. 80% of cases were in young people under 20 years old; half of the cases were in children under 5 years of age. From 2002–2004, the New Zealand Ministry of Health fast-tracked the development of a new vaccine against Meningococcal B, MeNZB.

In 2004, New Zealand Ministry of Health developed its Meningococcal Vaccine Strategy to plan and implement the country’s Meningococcal B Immunisation Programme. In June 2004, Cleverley-Bisman became the "face" of the epidemic. The vaccination program was highly successful and ran from 2004 to 2011; by 2006 there were around 300 cases of meningococcal group B disease, but by 2010 this had dropped to 30. A total of 239 people died between 1991–2006. Of the 5,900 cases, around 20% would suffer some degree of disability.

== Disease onset ==
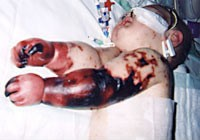
Charlotte Cleverley-Bisman, showing necrosis (tissue death) on arms

On the morning of 17 June 2004, Cleverley-Bisman vomited and acted distressed; her parents assumed this to be due to anticipated teething pains. By mid-morning, she had developed a small skin blemish on her neck, and her mother rushed her to the doctor's office, where staff diagnosed meningococcemia. Within ten minutes of her arrival, she was observed to be covered with small spots, a classic sign of the disease. She was then injected with penicillin, and airlifted to Starship Children's Health by helicopter. Within half an hour of the first spots being noticed, she was blistered, swollen, and purple over her entire body, with her extremities blackening. She was not expected to survive, and needed to be resuscitated twice during her first half-hour at Starship. She was connected to life-support systems, which fed her, transfused blood and drugs, and assisted her breathing.

On the second day in hospital, her doctors predicted that, if she lived at all, Cleverley-Bisman would need to have at least both legs and most of her left hand amputated in order to save her life from gangrene. During the three weeks while doctors waited for the demarcation between dead and living flesh to become clearer, her catheters became clogged several times and needed to be replaced via additional surgery. By the end of June, it was clear that all four of her limbs would need to be amputated. This was done on 2 July, amputating both her legs and left arm, "optimistically" transecting the knee joints, rather than amputating above them, hoping to preserve the growth plates at the end of her long bones, which would allow for better use of prosthetics later in life.

Cleverley-Bisman's parents helped her case to be publicised on national media, raising other parents' awareness of the virulent speed of the disease, and highlighting the need for a vaccine. Donors gave money to defray the Cleverley-Bismans' expenses, beginning with NZ$1000 from the Jassy Dean Trust, set up in 1992 in the aftermath of another girl dying from meningococcal disease.

== Recovery ==
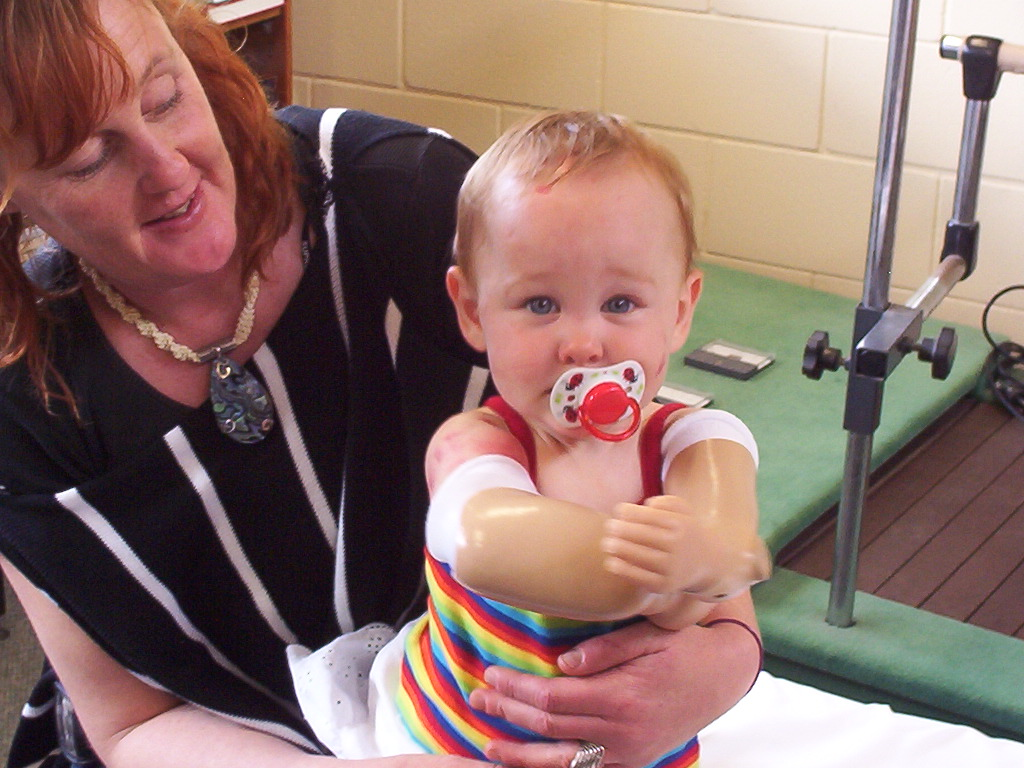
With mother Pam Cleverley, showing prosthetic arms and rehabilitation equipment

After two and a half months at Starship Hospital, Cleverley-Bisman was well enough to move to the Wilson Home in Takapuna, North Shore City, for three months of rehabilitation. Wriggling had kept her muscles relatively fit; she was able to roll over, and even put a cup to her mouth without the use of prosthetics. She returned to her home in Waiheke in November, just in time to celebrate her first birthday.

As part of her rehabilitation process, she played with toys and exercised on a daily basis. She took her first solo steps using prosthetic legs and crutches in September 2008, and no longer needed crutches by October 2009.

In December 2008, then aged five, Charlotte won TVNZ's inaugural Attitude Spirit award.

== Later life ==
By 2010, Charlotte had outgrown her prosthetic limbs and the family made a plea for help. In August 2011, Charlotte and her parents made a fourth trip to Camp No Limits, a camp for children with limb loss and also includes the parents, where she received physical therapy and learned to walk on new limbs. According to The New Zealand Herald the father stated that "the process would be an annual event, given Charlotte is still growing and therefore growing out of her prosthetics in a matter of a few months."

During her 2013 stay at Camp No Limits, Charlotte mentored other young meningitis amputees. By the age of 13, Charlotte took up several sports, such as surfing, skydiving and boxing.

== Public awareness and support ==
During Cleverley-Bisman's hospital stay, donors had given hundreds of gifts and around NZ$60,000 for her care; however, expenses were such that this would last less than a year. Following her hospitalisation, a trust was set up in her name. The primary mission of the trust was to provide for Cleverley-Bisman's life necessities, and the secondary goal of the foundation is to increase awareness of meningitis/meningococcal disease.

Cleverley-Bisman's illness and the surrounding interest generated much exposure of the issue of immunisation for meningococcal disease, and her case has been cited as helping spur immunisation drives. As a result of her case, her father helped publicise the availability of vaccination to help ensure that as many people are vaccinated as possible.
