= Pacific Soul =

Polynesian pop band

Pacific Soul is a four-piece female Polynesian pop band, created and produced by Sam Tu'uga of Jamoa Jam.

== History ==
They formed in Auckland, New Zealand in 2001 and have released two albums. The original members consist of Sara-Jane Auva'a, Julie Ta'ale, Sharleen Leaso and Maopa Lomavita. In 2003, their debut self-titled album won Best Pacific Island album at the 2003 NZ Music Awards, and Polynesian Album of the Year at the Hawai'i Music Awards the same year. Their second album, The Collaboration, was released in 2008.

They have toured New Zealand, Australia, parts of the Pacific, and throughout the United States.
