= Dylan Taite =

New Zealand rock music journalist

- Born: John William Dylan Taite; 2 November 1937; Liverpool, United Kingdom
- Died: 22 January 2003 (aged 65)
- Occupation: Television journalist

John William Dylan Taite (2 November 1937 – 22 January 2003) was a New Zealand rock music journalist. Born in Liverpool, he began working as a television journalist in New Zealand in the early 1970s. A passionate music fan, Taite established his reputation with eccentric interviews of famous musicians such as Bob Marley and Lou Reed.

Taite has been acclaimed at having a passion for highlighting up-and-coming musicians and presenting his material in a way that could engage general audiences.

== Life and career ==
Dylan Taite was born in Liverpool in 1937. He first received attention as part of a Beatles-inspired band called the Merseymen, in which Taite drummed under the stage name Jett Rink. This period is credited with giving Taite the music industry connections that he would later leverage in his journalistic career. After the breakup of the Merseymen in 1965, Taite moved to Christchurch later in the decade.

After arriving in New Zealand, Taite took a job with the New Zealand Broadcasting Corporation (NZBC)'s television division. In this position, he initially rose to prominence after securing an exclusive interview with the Rolling Stones. Taite continued to work at NZBC, and its successor TVNZ, for three decades.

During a 1976 visit to London, Taite interviewed the Sex Pistols outside Buckingham Palace. This interview is credited with inspiring the famous photo, taken the following year, in which the Sex Pistols sign their record contract in the same location.

Taite was involved in a car accident in December 2002. Though the accident initially seemed minor, Taite's health deteriorated in its aftermath. He died on 22 January 2003 after falling into a coma earlier in the month.

== Interview style ==
Taite was renowned for his ability to secure interviews, even with subjects who were otherwise resistant to interviewing. In one such example, Bob Marley came to Western Springs for a 1979 concert and was refusing all interviews. Taite waited at Marley's hotel and joined a pickup soccer game with the touring musicians, using the opportunity to build rapport and convince them to allow the interview. Taite was also known for being able to outmaneuver rival publicists by pulling musicians into surprise interviews at airports or hotels.

Taite's interviews were also known for their unorthodox composition. The footage was characteristically shot shakily, at extreme angles, and would be edited together to create a rapidly-shifting pace and framing. Former colleagues recall that Taite would wait to submit his interviews until the last moment before their deadlines, so as to prevent studio executives from re-editing his material.

== Legacy ==
Upon Taite's death, Judith Tizard – then the Associate Arts, Culture and Heritage Minister – remarked:

Dylan Taite's personal passion for music and his unique broadcasting style have left a huge imprint on New Zealand. Dylan's energy and enthusiasm, his broad intelligence and his deep respect for musicians and their work has been significant and inspirational. [...] The confidence and success currently being realised in the New Zealand music industry is a testament to his work.

The Taite Music Prize, named in honor of Taite, is an annual award honoring the best New Zealand album of the year.
