= Stellar Pritchard =

Poet, dancer and artist

- Born: Stellar Angafili Makarita Pritchard; 2003 (age 22–23); Auckland, New Zealand
- Known for: Poetry, MVPFAFF+ and LGBTQIA+ activist, Performing

Stellar Angafili Makarita Pritchard (born 2003) is a poet, dancer, artist, member of Coven-Aucoin and an advocate for the LGBT community. She is a trans woman of Samoan descent, living in New Zealand. As a poet Pritchard won the 'Word Up!' competition (2019) for her powerful and acclaimed poem When you Present as Male (2019). She performed the poem on New Zealand's national morning news show Breakfast (2019) and most recently performed it at A Slice of Southside (2023). She was a part of the Auckland Writers Festival (2023). As a member of the House of Coven-Aucoin since 2019, Pritchard has danced and performed at several festivals and events, including Auckland Pride with the House's show Fafaganda (2023). Pritchard also published an article for Vice Magazine (2023).

== Biography ==
Pritchard was born in New Zealand. Both of her parents are Samoan, from the villages of Tufuiopa and Tuana'i. She grew up in Auckland, New Zealand with her siblings Lexiga, Heaerit and Schvok. She attended St Paul's College (2015-2020). During her time at St Paul's College, Pritchard was the only female student as well as the only openly Trans person at 16.

At school is where Pritchard was introduced to the idea of poetry by one of her teachers, Rewa Worley. Worley was able to demystify poetry from something exclusive and inaccessible to a tool for speaking yourself into existence and affirming one's own experience. Inspired by this, Pritchard wrote her poem When you Present as Male (2019) and performed it at the annual Word Up! Competition. Word Up! is an annual performance competition held in West Auckland that gives 13 - 21-year-olds the opportunity to present their original artistic words. Pritchard used her poem as a vehicle to come out as Trans and celebrate who she is, speaking herself into existence. Her powerful message, masterful word smithery as well as her deep vulnerability and bravery deeply moved the audience the won her the Grand Prize of the competition (2019). She was invited to perform the poem on several local radio shows, slam poetry events, her school and New Zealand's national morning news show on TVNZ1s Breakfast (2019).

Pritchard also recently performed her poem in a variety show alongside poet Dominic Hoey and Musician-Singer Roy Irwin at Aucklands, The Wine Cellar (2023).

The poem is an ode to Pritchard's journey and a celebration of those who have supported, helped and uplifted her to be her best, biggest, brightest and most beautiful authentic self. She names them individually, acknowledging their hand in her story.

Prior to her appearance at Word Up! in 2019, Pritchard formed a relationship with Moe Laga, the House Mother of Coven-Aucoin. Moe Laga mentored Pritchard at this time and subsequently, Pritchard became part of the House of Coven-Aucoin. Moe Laga is one of the founding members of the ballroom community of New Zealand, an award-winning performance artist, and the mother of Coven-Aucoin. As the mother of Coven-Aucoin, which is an arts collective, she provides mentorship for LGBTQIA+ artists who have suffered discrimination or been lacking in community support.

Pritchard describes Moe Laga and Coven-Aucoin as her chosen family. They are her biggest support system. The biggest impact Coven-Aucoin and the other trans women have had on Pritchard is through "the way they held themselves, the way they dress and talk", which she says was empowering. They modelled for Pritchard that being a woman is more than genitalia, and created a safe space for her to feel secure and liberated in her identity.

Pritchard performed with and alongside Coven-Aucoin in the Auckland Pride Festival (2023). She was selected by FAFSWAG founder Tanu Gago alongside Coven-Aucoin to submit digital performance works that were projected at scale onto surrounding buildings of the festivals garden during sunset hours. The exhibition was called Diaspora Rendered (2023). She also performed with Coven-Aucoin in Fafaganda (2023) for Auckland Pride Festival.

Pritchard was also on the Youth Advisory Board for Le Va. Her work with the Pasifika community wellbeing organisation included providing support for Pasifika families and communities to have the best possible health and wellbeing outcomes. (2022)

Her inspirations are Beyonce, Nicki Minaj and Leona Lewis.

She has been published in Vice Magazine with an article about relationships from her unique and nuanced perspective (2023).

Professional Works
Year	Role	Work
2019	Slam Poet	Word Up! Competition Winner with original poem: When you Present as Male
2023	Slam Poet / Writer	Invited to share poems and ideas at Auckland Writers Festival
2022	Youth Advisory Board Member	Providing support for Pasifika families and communities to have the best possible health and wellbeing outcomes
2023	Artist / Performer	Diaspora Rendered curated by Tanu Gago for Auckland Pride Festival
2023	Dancer / Performer	Fafaganda for Auckland Pride Festival
