= Bruce Juddery =

Australian journalist (1941–2003)

- Born: 25 September 1941; Tauranga, New Zealand
- Died: 16 January 2003 (aged 61); Canberra, Australia
- Education: Australian National University
- Occupation: Journalist
- Children: Mark Juddery and Dalisay Krege

Bruce Juddery (25 September 1941 – 16 January 2003) was an Australian journalist. He wrote primarily for The Canberra Times.

== Life and career ==
Juddery was born in Tauranga, New Zealand, on 25 September 1941. He started his newspaper career writing for New Zealand provincial newspapers, before moving to Canberra around 1964 to work at The Canberra Times.

Juddery left The Canberra Times on several occasions—on one occasion to work as a public relations adviser at the Australian National University and on another to accept a role as secretary of the ACT branch of the Australian Journalists Association. During his career he was a regular at the National Press Club, where he was well known for his long and involved journalistic questions. Juddery opined that the best questions were those that "buggers can't answer and [show] them what bloody bullshit artists they are."

In 1979, Juddery was awarded the Canadian Award for Journalistic Merit, a national award for Australian journalistic excellence reporting on international affairs in the Pacific region.

In 1998 Juddery moved to Iona in Scotland, with a plan to write his memoirs and travel.

Juddery died in Canberra on 16 January 2003. He was the father of journalist Mark Juddery.

== Books ==
- At the Centre: the Australian Bureaucracy in the 1970s. Cheshire. 1974.
- White Collar Power: a History of the ACOA (1980)
