= Alan McLean (New Zealand cricketer) =

New Zealand cricketer

Personal information
- Born: 26 September 1911; Lyttelton, Canterbury, New Zealand
- Died: 12 August 2003 (aged 91); Hastings, Hawke’s Bay, New Zealand
- Batting: Right-handed
- Bowling: Right-arm medium-pace

Domestic team information
- Years: Team
- 1947–48: Wellington

Career statistics
Competition	First-class
Matches	4
Runs scored	274
Batting average	54.80
100s/50s	0/2
Top score	86
Balls bowled	861
Wickets	14
Bowling average	21.71
5 wickets in innings	0
10 wickets in match	0
Best bowling	4/25
Catches/stumpings	4/0
- Source: Cricinfo, 20 May 2018

Alan McLean (26 September 1911 – 12 August 2003) was a New Zealand cricketer who played first-class cricket for Wellington in the 1947-48 season.

A solid middle-order batsman and an accurate medium-pace bowler who was able to move the ball sharply off the wicket, McLean played for the Institute club in Wellington. He topped the Wellington Cricket Association averages in the 1936-37 season with 43 wickets at 11.23. In a match for a Wellington second team against Hawke's Bay in 1937-38 he took 5 for 9 off 10 overs in Hawke’s Bay’s first innings, then made the top score of the match with 51.

The Second World War intervened before McLean could play first-class cricket. A carpenter by trade, he served as a sapper with New Zealand forces in North Africa.

In 1947-48, at the age of 36, McLean played his only season of first-class cricket, a full season of four matches for Wellington. He made 41 and took 2 for 50 and 2 for 37 against Otago; made 15 and 38 not out and took 4 for 25 and 2 for 47 against Canterbury; and made 86 and took 2 for 51 and 0 for 50 against Auckland. With 180 runs at an average of 60.00 and 12 wickets at 21.83, he was sixth in the national Plunket Shield batting averages and first in the bowling among those bowlers with 10 wickets or more. At the end of the season, he played for Wellington in a first-class match against the touring Fijian team, making 21 and 73 and taking 0 for 12 and 2 for 30.
