= MeNZB =

Meningococcal vaccine in New Zealand

Vaccine description
- Target: group B meningococcus strain
- Vaccine type: Subunit

Clinical data
- Routes of administration: Injected
- ATC code: J07AH06 (WHO)

Legal status
- Legal status: In general: ℞ (Prescription only)

Identifiers
- CAS Number: 1107585-19-2
- ChemSpider: none

MeNZB was a vaccine against a specific strain of group B meningococcus, used to control an epidemic of meningococcal disease in New Zealand. Most people are able to carry the meningococcus bacteria safely with no ill effects. However, meningococcal disease can cause meningitis and sepsis, resulting in brain damage, failure of various organs, severe skin and soft-tissue damage, and death.

Immunisation with MeNZB requires three doses, administered approximately six weeks apart (except in newborns, who have them in conjunction with their 6-week, 3-month and 5-month injections). People who have been fully immunised may still carry the meningococcus bacteria and may still contract meningococcal disease.

== Components ==
Each dose is 0.5 ml and contains:

- 25 mcg of outer membrane vesicles from the Neisseria meningitidis group B strain NZ98/254. The vaccine does not contain any whole bacteria (alive or dead). The "outer membrane vesicles" it contains are a small part of the "skin" of the bacteria that let the immune system recognise and prepare for being infected with the real thing. MeNZB vaccine does not contain any human, blood, or bovine (cow) products, egg products, neomycin or the preservative thiomersal (mercury). There are no live meningococcal bacteria in the vaccine and it is not possible to catch the disease or become a carrier of the disease from the vaccine.
- 1.65 mg of aluminium hydroxide (an adjuvant). The immune system will normally not mount an immune response to the outer membrane vesicles if they are presented alone. The presence of the adjuvant forces the immune system to respond to the membrane vesicles by acting to prevent their breakdown and elimination, while causing local tissue damage to provoke the desired immune reaction.
- histidine (to stabilise the pH). The histidine pH buffer is to ensure the vaccine stays as close as possible to the pH of human body fluids. This is to ensure the immune system does not waste time trying to neutralise the vaccine instead of responding to the outer membrane vesicles.
- normal saline. The saline (sterile salt and water) is also like packaging. It is required so that all of the above can be dissolved into a solution that can be injected. It is the same salinity (saltiness) as normal human body fluid.

The antigen in MeNZB is prepared from B:4:P1.7b,4 (NZ 98/254 ) N. meningitidis strain, grown in a fermentor. The bacteria are grown in a synthetic culture medium containing sugar, essential amino acids and essential elements such as iron and potassium. The fermentation does not use bovine or porcine products. The cellular outer membranes are extracted with the detergent deoxycholate, which kills the bacteria. Outer membrane vesicles are purified out of the culture medium by ultracentrifugation, stabilised by histidine and then adsorbed to aluminium hydroxide Al(OH)_{3} as an adjuvant. Purification is achieved by ultrafiltration/diafiltration.

== Impact ==
Since its introduction in 2004 the vaccine has had a dramatic impact on the meningitis epidemic began in 1991. Between 2004 and 2006 New Zealand offered free MeNZB vaccination to anyone under the age of 20. Routine immunisation for babies and preschoolers continued until June 2008. The last phase of this programme, immunisation for people with a high medical risk, ended in March 2011. Reasons given for this halt of the programme include that the epidemic was coming to an end, and that immune protection given by the vaccine is only short-term. The primary analysis estimated MeNZB to have an effectiveness of 77% after 3 doses and a mean follow-up time of 3.2 years.

As N. gonorrhoeae and N. meningitidis are closely related bacteria and have 80–90% homology in their genetic sequences some cross-protection by meningococcal vaccines against N. gonorrhoeae infections is plausible. A study published in 2017 showed that MeNZB vaccine provided a partial protection against Gonorrhea. The vaccine efficiency was calculated to be 31%.
