= Meningococcal disease =

- Other names: invasive meningococcal disease (IMD)
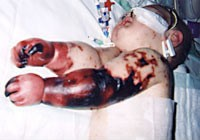
- Charlotte Cleverley-Bisman, a young survivor of meningococcal disease. Her necrotic arms and legs had to be amputated later.
- Specialty: Infectious disease; critical care medicine
- Symptoms: Flu-like symptoms; neck stiffness; altered mental status; seizures; purpura and petechiae
- Complications: Septic shock leading to gangrene and organ failure; brain damage; blindness; deafness
- Usual onset: Usually 3–4 days
- Causes: Neisseria meningitidis spread by respiratory droplets or saliva
- Risk factors: Complement deficiencies; asplenia
- Diagnostic method: Isolation of N. meningitidis from blood or cerebrospinal fluid by culture or PCR
- Prevention: Meningococcal vaccine; preventative antibiotics in those exposed
- Treatment: Antibiotics; supportive care
- Medication: Antibiotics including cephalosporins, penicillins, and rifampin
- Prognosis: 80% mortality rate if untreated; 4–20% mortality rate with treatment
- Frequency: 1.2 million (2012)
- Deaths: 135,000 (2012)

Meningococcal disease is a serious, vaccine-preventable infection caused by Neisseria meningitidis, a gram-negative diplococcus bacterium also known as meningococcus. Meningococcal disease presents as life-threatening and rapidly progressive meningitis (infection of the protective membranes surrounding the brain and spinal cord), meningococcal septicemia (infection of the bloodstream), or a combination of both. Early symptoms may be nonspecific and flu-like. Meningitis commonly causes fever, headache, and neck stiffness, sometimes accompanied by nausea, vomiting, photophobia, and confusion. A purple non-blanching rash may also be present. As infection progresses, septic shock eventually leads to gangrene and organ failure. Left untreated, meningococcal disease has an 80% mortality rate. With proper treatment, the mortality rate drops to 4–20%, with roughly 20% of survivors experiencing long-term complications including brain damage, blindness, deafness, and amputation.

Neisseria meningitidis colonizes the nasopharynx of roughly 10% of the population without symptoms, but meningococcal disease can develop in rare cases when the bacteria enter the bloodstream. Meningococcal disease is transmitted by respiratory droplets or saliva from anyone who carries the bacteria in their respiratory tract, including asymptomatic individuals, although transmission usually requires close or lengthy contact. Symptoms usually begin three to four days after exposure. Almost all cases of meningococcal disease are caused by one of six encapsulated serotypes of N. meningitidis: A, B, C, W, X, and Y. Risk factors for infection include immunodeficiency, especially in cases of complement component deficiencies and low or absent spleen function. Diagnosis is often suspected based on symptoms and confirmed by culture or PCR finding N. meningitidis in the blood or cerebrospinal fluid.

Several vaccines against meningococcal disease have been developed against all six disease-causing serotypes and have significantly reduced the incidence of disease. The United States CDC recommends the vaccine for all adolescents, along with children and adults at increased risk of infection. The World Health Organization recommends mass vaccination in areas with high rates of meningococcal disease. Meningococcal disease is treated with antibiotics; cephalosporins are generally the first-line treatment. In severe cases, additional supportive care may be necessary, and necrotic limbs may require amputation. Atypical presentation of meningococcal disease can rarely occur in the form of pneumonia, septic arthritis, and other infections.

Predominant disease-causing serotypes differ by country and age group, with serotype B accounting for most new cases worldwide. Most cases in the developed world are sporadic, with outbreaks rarely occurring in residential settings such as college campuses. In the United States, incidence is highest among children under 5, young adults, and older adults. In some regions, such as the African meningitis belt, meningococcal disease is endemic and outbreaks are more frequent. In 2012, an estimated 1.2 million cases of meningococcal disease occurred worldwide, resulting in roughly 135,000 deaths.

== Signs and symptoms ==
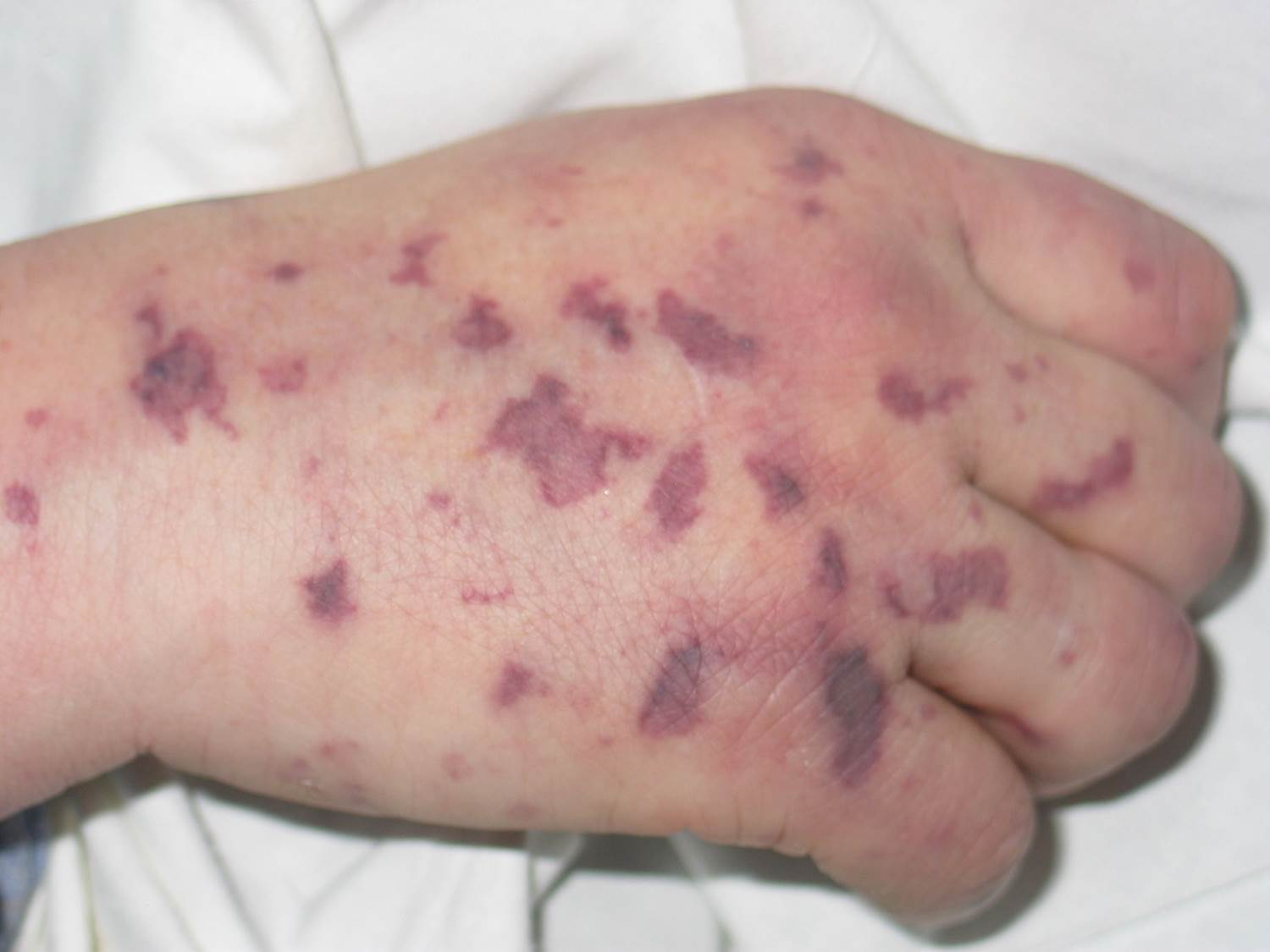
Purpura on the hand of a person with meningococcal sepsis

Meningococcal disease refers to a broad spectrum of conditions caused by invasive Neisseria meningitidis infection. It typically presents in two primary forms: meningitis and meningococcal septicemia. Meningitis is the most common presentation, representing roughly half of U.S. cases; in meningococcal meningitis, N. meningitidis invades the meninges, protective membranes surrounding the central nervous system. Meningococcal septicemia, in which N. meningitidis invades the bloodstream and triggers a life-threatening immune response known as sepsis, presents without meningitis in roughly 30% of U.S. cases. Many cases involve both meningitis and sepsis. Symptoms generally begin three to four days after exposure.

Initial symptoms appear as flu-like illness, which can be problematic due to the necessity for prompt treatment. Meningococcal meningitis typically presents with sudden onset of fever, headache, neck stiffness, nausea, vomiting, and myalgia (muscle pain). Meningitis also causes neurological symptoms, including altered mental status and photophobia (sensitivity of the eyes to light). Kernig's sign and Brudziński's sign can confirm meningitis, but each have low sensitivities and cannot exclude illness. The classic "triad" of meningitis symptoms consists of fever, neck stiffness, and altered mental status; however, all three symptoms are present in less than half of meningitis cases. Infants may present with different symptoms, including inactivity, irritability, poor feeding, and abnormal reflexes. There may also be a bulge in the anterior fontanelle at the top of the head. Meningococcal septicemia, also known as meningococcemia, also causes flu-like symptoms that are difficult to differentiate from other illnesses. Initial symptoms of sepsis include fever, chills, diarrhea, nausea, vomiting, fatigue, and muscle and joint pain. Other common signs include hypotension (low blood pressure) and tachycardia (high heart rate).

Another hallmark sign of meningococcal disease is bleeding under the skin, causing purple bruising known as petechiae (less than 3 mm in diameter) or purpura (3–10 mm). Bleeding under the skin can be confirmed if rolling a glass over the skin does not cause the rash to fade.

=== Complications ===
Meningococcal disease is a rapidly progressive disease, and without treatment can quickly lead to extensive complications. Even with treatment, one in five survivors experience long-term complications. Like other gram-negative infections, N. meningitidis releases endotoxin, causing disseminated intravascular coagulation (DIC), a condition in which blood clots block small blood vessels. As available clotting factors are used up, bleeding occurs throughout the body and blood vessels are damaged. Sepsis eventually leads to tissue death (necrosis) and organ failure throughout the body. Tissue death is most common in the limbs, which may require amputation after treatment. If hemorrhaging affects the adrenal glands, Waterhouse–Friderichsen syndrome can occur, causing deadly adrenal insufficiency. Meningitis may cause irreversible brain damage, blindness, deafness, and other neurological problems.

=== Atypical presentations ===
While meningitis and sepsis are the two most common complications of meningococcal disease, in rarer cases, N. meningitidis can infect and cause complications in other parts of the body. In about 15% of cases, meningococcal disease presents as bacterial pneumonia; this is the most common presentation in adults over 65. This is a multi-lobar, rapidly evolving pneumonia, sometimes associated with septic shock. With prompt treatment, the prognosis is excellent.

Meningococcal disease can also cause septic arthritis, in which N. meningitidis infects joints, causing inflammation. Septic arthritis presents with joint pain, redness, warmth, and restricted joint movement. It most commonly affects the knee and is usually confined to one joint. Meningococcal disease can cause gastrointestinal symptoms in some cases, including nausea, vomiting, and abdominal pain, which can result in misdiagnosis. In rare cases, meningococcal disease can affect the pericardium, the sac surrounding the heart, causing pericarditis.

Although not considered within the definition of meningococcal disease, N. meningitidis has been found to cause urethritis in men, causing urethral discharge and pain or discomfort during urination.

== Cause and transmission ==
Meningococcal disease is caused by infection by the bacterium Neisseria meningitidis. Also known as the meningococcus, N. meningitidis is a gram-negative diplococcus that colonizes the nasopharynx of around 5–10% of the population as a commensal organism. Meningococcal disease develops in rare cases when N. meningitidis enters the bloodstream, rapidly leading to systemic infection. While there are 13 identified serotypes of N. meningitidis, almost all cases of meningococcal disease are caused by one of six serotypes with polysaccharide capsules: A, B, C, W, X, and Y.

Meningococcal disease is transmitted by respiratory droplets or saliva from an individual who carries N. meningitidis in their respiratory tract. Therefore, it can be spread both by asymptomatic carriers and people with meningococcal disease. However, it is generally not very contagious, and close contact is usually required for transmission.

== Pathogenesis ==
Meningococcal disease causes life-threatening meningitis and sepsis conditions. In the case of meningitis, bacteria attack the lining between the brain and skull called the meninges. Infected fluid from the meninges then passes into the spinal cord, causing symptoms including stiff neck, fever, and rashes. The meninges (and sometimes the brain itself) begin to swell, which affects the central nervous system.

Even with antibiotics, approximately 1 in 10 people who suffer from meningococcal meningitis will die; however, a similar proportion of survivors are affected by limb loss, hearing impairment, or permanent brain damage. The sepsis type of infection is much more deadly, and results in a severe blood poisoning called meningococcal sepsis that affects the entire body. In this case, bacterial toxins rupture blood vessels and can rapidly shut down vital organs. Within hours, patients' health can change from seemingly good to mortally ill.

The N. meningitidis bacterium is surrounded by a slimy outer coat that contains disease-causing endotoxin. While many bacteria produce endotoxin, the levels produced by meningococcal bacteria are 100 to 1,000 times greater (and accordingly more lethal) than normal. As the bacteria multiply and move through the bloodstream, it sheds concentrated amounts of toxin. The endotoxin directly affects the heart, reducing its ability to circulate blood, and also causes pressure on blood vessels throughout the body. As some blood vessels start to hemorrhage, major organs like the lungs and kidneys are damaged.

Patients with meningococcal disease are treated with a large dose of antibiotic, like penicillin or cephalosporins. The systemic antibiotic in the bloodstream rapidly kills the bacteria, with some harmful bacterial mass and endotoxin being released in the process of lysis. There is a lack of evidence that this phenomenon is clinically significant, with studies pointing to an overall decrease in endotoxin release with antibiotic treatment in comparison to leaving it untreated. It may take several days for the toxin to be neutralized by the body through continuous liquid treatment and antibiotic therapy due to inflammatory responses and the initial amount of bacteria.

== Diagnosis ==
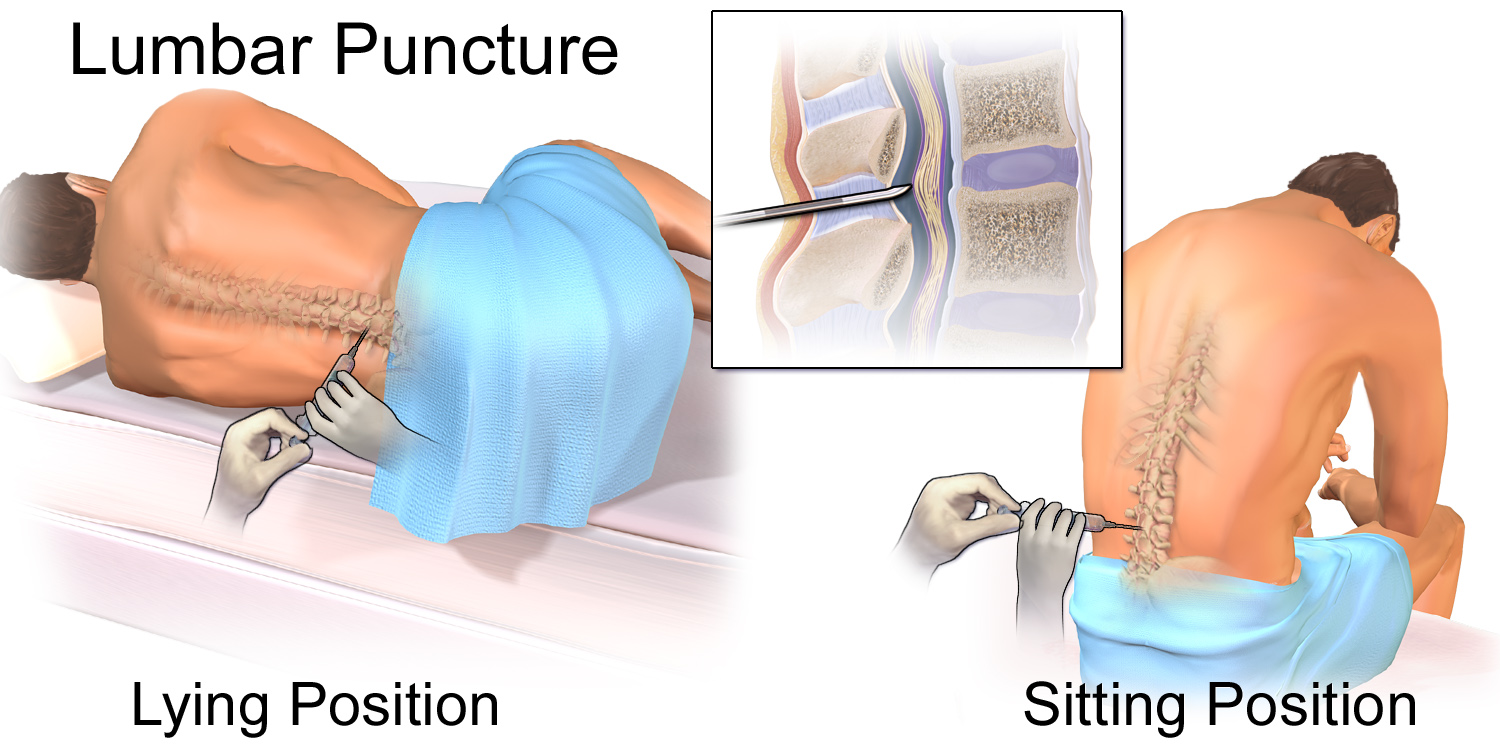
A lumbar puncture can be used to collect cerebrospinal fluid from a patient and diagnose meningococcal meningitis.

Diagnosing meningococcal disease is vital, as death can occur in a person within 6–12 hours of initial signs and symptoms. Therefore, if diagnosis can be suspected based on symptoms, treatment should begin even before the diagnosis is confirmed. The gold standard for diagnosis of meningococcal disease is the isolation of Neisseria meningitidis from sterile body fluids, usually the cerebrospinal fluid by lumbar puncture or the blood. Testing of the synovial fluid in the joints or pleural fluid in the lungs can confirm septic arthritis or pneumonia, respectively, caused by N. meningitidis.

If a patient presents with evidence of elevated intracranial pressure, such as altered mental status or focal neurological deficits, a lumbar puncture should be avoided because of the risk of brain herniation In these cases, a computer tomography (CT) scan can assist diagnosis.

== Prevention ==
The most effective method of prevention against meningococcal disease are vaccines that invoke acquired immunity against N. meningitidis. Other effective prevention methods include prophylactic antibiotics for those exposed to contagious individuals. Vaccines are currently available against all of these strains. The United States CDC recommends the vaccine for all adolescents, along with children and adults at increased risk of infection. The World Health Organization recommends mass vaccination in areas with high rates of meningococcal disease.

Vaccines offer significant protection from three to five years (plain polysaccharide vaccine Menomune, Mencevax and NmVac-4) to more than eight years (conjugate vaccine Menactra).

=== Vaccinations ===
Since the development of the first meningococcal vaccine in the 1970s, vaccines have been developed against all six disease-causing serotypes of N. meningitidis, which differ based on their polysaccharide capsule. The first vaccines were polysaccharide vaccines, and faced several limitations including failure to produce immunological memory or prevent nasopharyngeal carriage. This reduced the ability of the vaccine to provide herd immunity for those unable or unwilling to be vaccinated. By 1999, the first meningococcal conjugate vaccines were introduced with polysaccharides conjugated to stronger antigens. The development of a vaccine specifically against serotype B was challenging because the serotype B polysaccharide resembles a human neural cell adhesion molecule, provoking concerns about autoimmunity. However, vaccines against serotype B infection were eventually developed first based on outer membrane vesicles and then based on conserved proteins. By 2013, the first broad-coverage serotype B vaccine was approved for use in the European Union. In July 2023, the World Health Organization approved the first vaccine to protect against serotype X infection.

==== Children ====
Children 2–10 years of age who are at high risk for meningococcal disease, such as certain chronic medical conditions and travel to or reside in countries with hyperendemic or epidemic meningococcal disease, should receive primary immunization. Although the safety and efficacy of the vaccine have not been established in children younger than 2 years of age and under outbreak control, the unconjugated vaccine can be considered. In the UK, infants are routinely vaccinated against serotype B.

==== Adolescents ====
Primary immunization against meningococcal disease with meningitis A, C, Y, and W-135 vaccines is recommended for all young adolescents at 11–12 years of age and all unvaccinated older adolescents at 15 years of age. Although conjugate vaccines are the preferred meningococcal vaccine in adolescents 11 years of age or older, polysaccharide vaccines are an acceptable alternative if the conjugated vaccine is unavailable.

==== Adults ====
Primary immunization with meningococcal A, C, Y, and W-135 vaccines is recommended for college students who plan to live in dormitories. The risk of meningococcal disease in college students aged 18–24 years is similar to that of the general population of similar age.

Routine primary immunization against meningococcal disease is recommended for most adults living in areas where meningococcal disease is endemic or who are planning to travel to such areas. Although conjugate vaccines are the preferred meningococcal vaccine in adults 55 years of age or younger, polysaccharide vaccines are an acceptable alternative for adults in this age group if the conjugated vaccine is unavailable. Since the safety and efficacy of conjugate vaccines in adults older than 55 years of age have not been established to date, polysaccharide vaccines should be used for primary immunization in this group.

==== Medical staff ====
Health care personnel should receive routine immunization against meningococcal disease, especially laboratory personnel who are routinely exposed to isolates of N. meningitidis. Laboratory personnel and medical staff are at risk of exposure to N. meningitides or to patients with meningococcal disease. The Hospital Infection Control Practices Advisory Committee (HICPAC) recommends healthcare workers be routinely vaccinated against meningococcus. Any individual 11–55 years of age who wishes to reduce their risk of meningococcal disease may receive meningococcal A, C, Y, and W-135 vaccines, and those older than 55 years of age. Under certain circumstances if unvaccinated health-care personnel cannot get vaccinated and who have intensive contact with oropharyngeal secretions of infected patients and who do not use proper precautions should receive anti-infective prophylaxis against meningococcal infection (i.e., 2-day regimen of oral rifampicin or a single dose of IM ceftriaxone or a single dose of oral ciprofloxacin).

==== United States military recruits ====
Because the risk of meningococcal disease is increased among United States military recruits, all military recruits routinely receive primary immunization against the disease.

==== Travelers ====
Immunization against meningococcal disease is not a requirement for entry into any country, unlike yellow fever. Only Saudi Arabia requires that travelers to that country for the annual Hajj and Umrah pilgrimage have a certificate of vaccination against meningococcal disease, issued not more than 3 years and not less than 10 days before arrival in Saudi Arabia.

Travelers to or residents of areas where N. meningitidis is highly endemic or epidemic are at risk of exposure should receive primary immunization against meningococcal disease.

==== HIV-infected individuals ====
HIV-infected individuals are likely to be at increased risk for meningococcal disease; HIV-infected individuals who wish to reduce their risk of meningococcal disease may receive primary immunization against meningococcal disease. Although the efficacy of meningococcal A, C, Y, and W-135 vaccines has not been evaluated in HIV-infected individuals to date, HIV-infected individuals 11–55 years of age may receive primary immunization with the conjugated vaccine. Vaccination against meningitis does not decrease CD4+ T-cell counts or increase viral load in HIV-infected individuals, and there has been no evidence that the vaccines adversely affect survival.

==== Close contacts ====
Protective levels of anticapsular antibodies are not achieved until 7–14 days following administration of a meningococcal vaccine. Vaccination cannot prevent early-onset disease in these contacts and usually is not recommended following sporadic cases of invasive meningococcal disease. Unlike developed countries, in sub-Saharan Africa and other underdeveloped countries, entire families live in a single room of a house.

Meningococcal infection is usually introduced into a household by an asymptomatic person. Carriage then spreads through the household, reaching infants usually after one or more other household members have been infected. Disease is most likely to occur in infants and young children who lack immunity to the strain of organism circulating and who subsequently acquire carriage of an invasive strain.

Close contacts are defined as those persons who could have had intimate contact with the patient's oral secretions, such as through kissing or sharing of food or drink. The importance of the carrier state in meningococcal disease is well known. In developed countries, the disease transmission usually occurs in day care, schools, and large gatherings, where disease transmission can usually occur. Since respiratory droplets transmit meningococcus and are susceptible to drying, it has been postulated that close contact is necessary for transmission. Therefore, the disease transmission to other susceptible persons cannot be prevented. Meningitis occurs sporadically throughout the year, and since the organism has no known reservoir outside of man, asymptomatic carriers are usually the source of transmission.

Additionally, basic hygiene measures, such as handwashing and not sharing drinking cups, can reduce the incidence of infection by limiting exposure. When a case is confirmed, all close contacts with the infected person can be offered antibiotics to reduce the likelihood of the infection spreading to other people. However, rifampin-resistant strains have been reported, and the indiscriminate use of antibiotics contributes to this problem. Chemoprophylaxis is commonly used for those close contacts who are at the highest risk of carrying the pathogenic strains. Since vaccine duration is unknown, mass selective vaccinations may be the most cost-effective means for controlling the transmission of the meningococcal disease, rather than mass routine vaccination schedules.

==== Chronic medical conditions ====
Persons with component deficiencies in the final common complement pathway (C3, C5-C9) are more susceptible to N. meningitidis infection than complement-satisfactory persons, and it was estimated that the risk of infection is 7000 times higher in such individuals. In addition, complement component-deficient populations frequently experience frequent meningococcal disease since their immune response to natural infection may be less complete than that of complement non-deficient persons.

Inherited properdin deficiency is also related to an increased risk of contracting meningococcal disease. Persons with functional or anatomic asplenia may not efficiently clear encapsulated Neisseria meningitidis from the bloodstream. Persons with other conditions associated with immunosuppression also may be at increased risk of developing meningococcal disease.

=== Antibiotics ===
An updated 2013 Cochrane review investigated the effectiveness of different antibiotics for prophylaxis against meningococcal disease and eradication of N. meningitidis, particularly in people at risk of being carriers. The systematic review included 24 studies with 6,885 participants. During follow-up, no cases of meningococcal disease were reported, and thus, true antibiotic preventive measures could not be directly assessed. However, the data suggested that rifampin, ceftriaxone, ciprofloxacin, and penicillin were equally effective for the eradication of N. meningitidis in potential carriers, although rifampin was associated with antibiotic resistance following treatment. Eighteen studies provided data on side effects and reported that they were minimal but included nausea, abdominal pain, dizziness, and pain at the injection site.

=== Disease outbreak control ===
Meningitis A, C, Y, and W-135 vaccines can be used in large-scale vaccination programs during meningococcal disease outbreaks in Africa and other regions globally. Whenever sporadic or cluster cases or outbreaks of meningococcal disease occur in the US, chemoprophylaxis is the principal means of preventing secondary cases in household and other close contacts of individuals with invasive disease. Meningitis A, C, Y, and W-135 vaccines may rarely be used as an adjunct to chemoprophylaxis, but only in situations where there is an ongoing risk of exposure (e.g., when cluster cases or outbreaks occur) and when a serogroup contained in the vaccine is involved.

It is important that clinicians promptly report all cases of suspected or confirmed meningococcal disease to local public health authorities and identify the serogroup of the meningococcal strain involved. The effectiveness of mass vaccination programs depends on early and accurate recognition of outbreaks. When a suspected outbreak of meningococcal disease occurs, public health authorities will then determine whether mass vaccinations (with or without mass chemoprophylaxis) are indicated and delineate the target population to be vaccinated based on risk assessment.

== Treatment ==
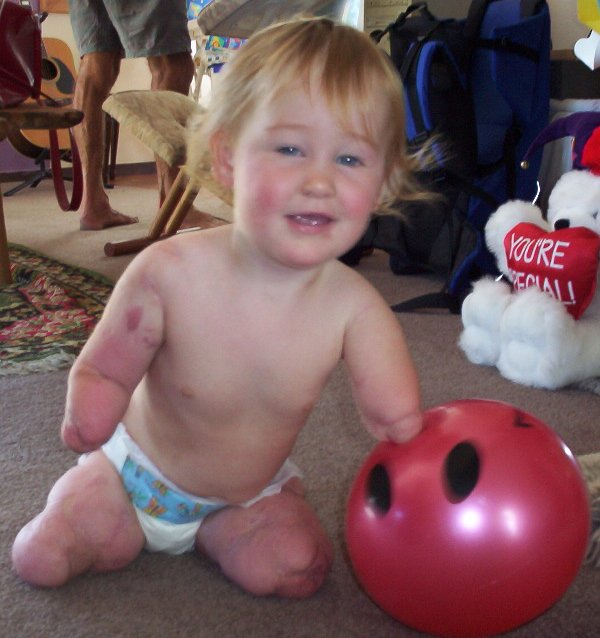
Charlotte Cleverley-Bisman, who had all four limbs partially amputated aged seven months due to meningococcal B disease.

Meningococcal disease is treated with intravenous antibiotics. Due to the rapid progression of infection and high risk of complications and death, treatment should be administered if meningococcal disease is suspected, even without confirmation from culture or PCR. Initial treatment is with broad spectrum cephalosporins such as cefotaxime or ceftriaxone. After diagnosis is confirmed, benzylpenicillin or ampicillin can be used if testing finds the strain susceptible to penicillin. A single dose of cephalosporin antibiotic also clears N. meningitidis from the nasopharynx; if cephalosporin treatment is not used in initial treatment, a single dose of cephalosporin or a course of rifampin can be used.

In severe cases of meningococcal disease, such as those involving septic shock additional supportive care may be required. This may include IV fluids, intubation, and vasopressors that raise blood pressure. In patients with signs of disseminated intravascular coagulation, aggressive treatment should be provided, including IV rehydration and blood transfusions, along with replacement of platelets and coagulation factors which are depleted by DIC.

There is some debate on which antibiotic is most effective at treating the illness. A systematic review compared two antibiotics. There was one trial: an open-label (not blinded) non-inferiority trial of 510 people comparing two antibiotics: ceftriaxone (in which there were 14 deaths out of 247), and chloramphenicol (12 deaths out of 256). There were no reported side effects. Both antibiotics were considered equally effective. Antibiotic choice should be based on local antibiotic resistance information.

== Prognosis ==
Without treatment, meningococcal disease is often fatal, with a case fatality rate of up to 80%. Proper treatment reduces the case fatality rate to 4–20%, averaging out at about 10%. Around one-fifth of survivors experience permanent disability including blindness, hearing loss, neurological damage, or gangrene in the limbs requiring amputation.

=== Complications ===
Complications following meningococcal disease can be divided into early and late groups. Early complications include: raised intracranial pressure, disseminated intravascular coagulation, seizures, circulatory collapse, and organ failure.

Later complications of meningococcal disease can be physical, neurological, or psychological. Physical effects, most commonly following meningococcal sepsis, may include limb malformation or amputation. These outcomes are more frequently observed in children who have experienced invasive meningococcal disease. Neurological complications, typically associated with meningococcal meningitis, can include hearing loss, cognitive impairments, and seizures. Psychological effects, observed in children, include post-traumatic stress disorder (PTSD) and increased levels of anxiety.

== Epidemiology ==
The epidemiology of meningococcal disease varies between different populations and regions worldwide. In 2012, Methods in Molecular Biology estimated that around 1.2 million cases of meningococcal disease occur worldwide each year, causing an estimated 135,000 deaths. In 2015, The Lancet estimated around 73,000 deaths occurred worldwide due to meningococcal meningitis alone (not including meningococcemia and other presentations). Disease-causing serotypes vary by country and age group, with serotype B accounting for most new cases worldwide. In the United States and other parts of the developed world, incidence is highest among children under 5, young adults, and older adults. Due to the availability of meningococcal vaccination and antibiotics, outbreaks in the developed world are rare, and 98% of cases are sporadic. Outbreaks that do occur tend to take place in dense settings such as schools, college campuses, nursing homes, and prisons. In some parts of the world such as the African meningitis belt, outbreaks of meningococcal disease are much more frequent.

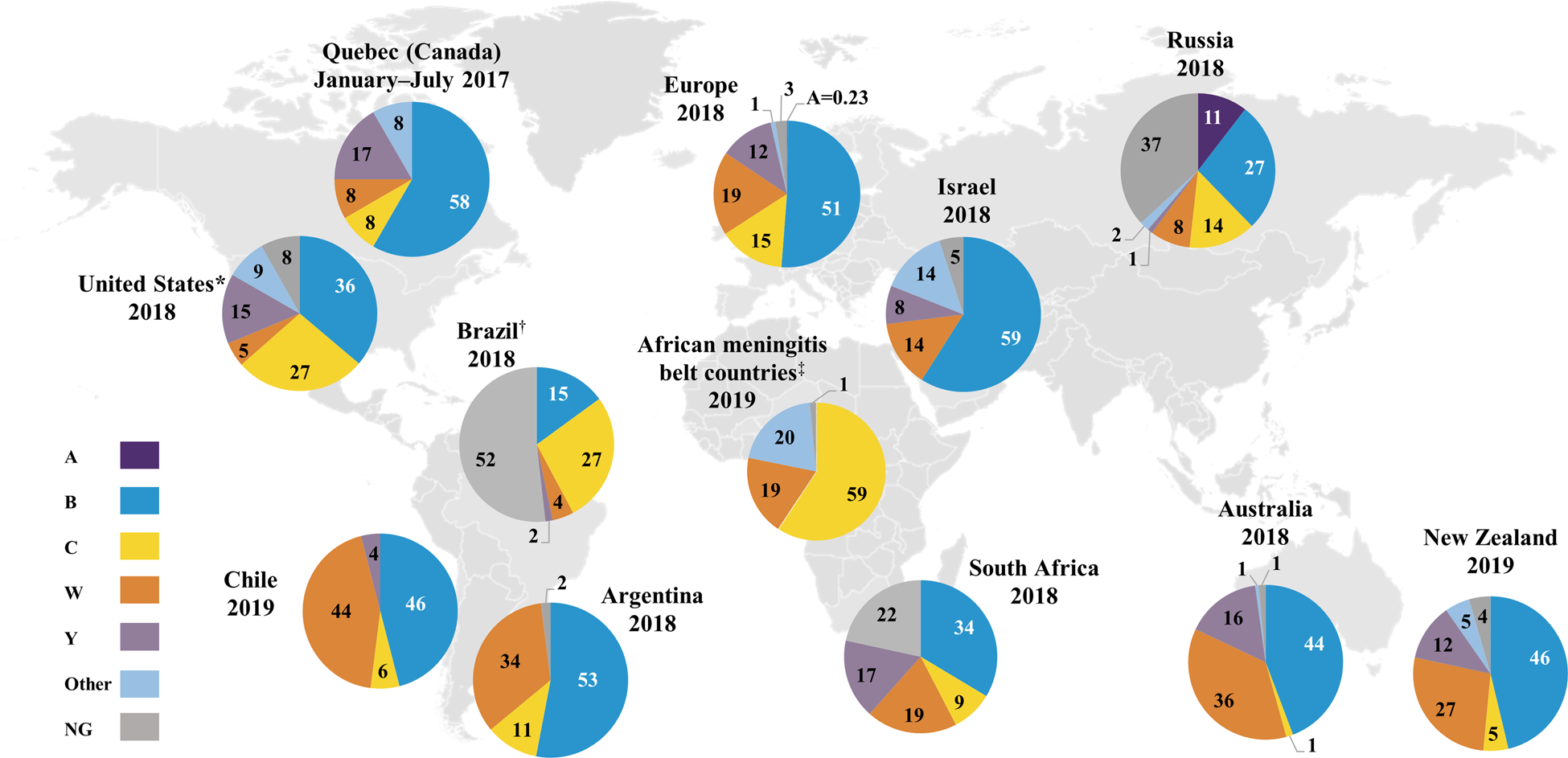
Percentage serogroup distribution of IMD cases worldwide from 2017 to 2019 (geographical regions with available data). Data from China, Colombia, the Dominican Republic, Japan, Kuwait, Mozambique, Paraguay, South Korea, Uruguay, and Venezuela are not shown. Percentages may not sum to 100% due to rounding. *Serogroup A is included in the “Other” category. ^{†}Serogroups other than B, C, W, and Y are included in the NG category. ^{‡}Among the African meningitis belt countries, Benin, Burkina Faso, Cameroon, Central African Republic, Ghana, Mali, Niger, Nigeria, Senegal, South Sudan, Chad, and Togo contributed serogroup data

=== Africa ===
The distribution of meningococcal meningitis in the African meningitis belt

The importance of meningitis disease is as significant in Africa as HIV, TB, and malaria. Cases of meningococcemia leading to severe meningoencephalitis are common among young children and the elderly. Deaths occurring in less than 24 hours are more likely during the disease epidemic seasons in Africa, and Sub-Saharan Africa is hit by meningitis outbreaks throughout the epidemic season. It may be that climate change contributes significantly the spread of the disease in Benin, Burkina Faso, Cameroon, the Central African Republic, Chad, Côte d'Ivoire, the Democratic Republic of the Congo, Ethiopia, Ghana, Mali, Niger, Nigeria and Togo. This is an area of Africa where the disease is endemic: meningitis is "silently" present, and there are always a few cases. When the number of cases passes five per population of 100,000 in one week, teams are on alert. Epidemic levels are reached when there have been 100 cases per 100,000 population over several weeks.

Further complicating efforts to halt the spread of meningitis in Africa is the fact that extremely dry, dusty weather conditions, which characterize Niger and Burkina Faso from December to June, favor the development of epidemics. Overcrowded villages are breeding grounds for bacterial transmission and lead to a high prevalence of respiratory tract infections, leaving the body more susceptible to infection, encouraging the spread of meningitis. IRIN Africa news has been providing the number of deaths for each country since 1995, and a mass vaccination campaign following a community outbreak of meningococcal disease in Florida was done by the CDC.

=== Americas ===
From 2021 to 2023 there was an outbreak of the disease in Florida primarily in MSM caused by serogroup C.

== History and etymology ==
From the Greek meninx (membrane) + kokkos (berry), meningococcal disease was first described by Gaspard Vieusseux during an outbreak in Geneva in 1805. In 1884, Italian pathologists Ettore Marchiafava and Angelo Celli described intracellular micrococci in cerebrospinal fluid, and in 1887, Anton Weichselbaum identified the meningococcus (designated as Diplococcus intracellularis meningitidis) in cerebrospinal fluid and established the connection between the organism and epidemic meningitis. "Meningococcal disease" is often colloquially referred to as "meningitis," even though meningitis can be caused by several other infections and meningococcal disease does not exclusively lead to meningitis.

== See also ==
- Endocarditis
- Pathogenic bacteria
- Waterhouse–Friderichsen syndrome
- African meningitis belt
- 2009–10 West African meningitis outbreak
- Meningococcal vaccine
- Meningitis Vaccine Project
- Niels Vink, Dutch sufferer of the disease, champion wheelchair tennis player
