= Milburn =

Milburn may refer to:

== Places ==
=== United States ===
- Milburn, Kentucky, an unincorporated community
- Milburn, Nebraska, an unincorporated community
- Milburn Township, Custer County, Nebraska
- Milburn, Oklahoma, a town
- Milburn, Texas, an unincorporated community
- Milburn, Utah, an unincorporated community
- Milburn, West Virginia, an unincorporated community
- Milburn Creek, West Virginia

=== Elsewhere ===
- Milburn, Cumbria, England, a village and civil parish
- Milburn, New Zealand, a settlement
- Milburn Bay, Trinity Island, Antarctica
- Milburn Peak, British Columbia, Canada

== People ==
- Milburn (surname)
- Milburn (given name)

== Other uses ==
- Milburn (band), an English indie rock band
- Milburn baronets, an extant title in the Baronetage of the United Kingdom
- Milburn building, Toronto, Canada
- Milburn Electric, an electric car company active from 1915 to 1923
- Milburn Schools, an American private school and charter school operator
- Brooklyn Waterworks, also known as the Milburn Pumping Station, a former historic building in Freeport, Long Island, New York

== See also ==
- Millburn (disambiguation)
