= Melbourne (name) =

Melbourne is a surname, and a masculine given name. It is derived from the English toponym Melbourne, named in Old English as 'millstream', from mylen 'mill' and burna 'stream', i.e. the mill by the stream.

== Given name ==
- Melbourne Armstrong Carriker (1879–1965), American ornithologist and entomologist
- Melbourne Parker Boynton (1867–1942), American pastor and temperance proponent
- Melbourne Brindle (1904–1995), Australian-American illustrator and painter
- Melbourne H. Ford (1849–1891), American politician
- Melbourne Gass (1938–2018), Canadian politician
- Melbourne Inman (1878–1951), English snooker player
- Melbourne Johns (1901–1955), Welsh-born munitions factory worker
- Melbourne MacDowell (1856–1941), American stage and screen actor
- Melbourne McTaggart Tait (1842–1917), Canadian lawyer and judge
- Melbourne Moran, American politician
- Melbourne Thomas (1896–1966), Welsh rugby union player
- Melbourne Tierney (1923–2014), Welsh rugby league player

== Surname ==
- A. C. V. Melbourne (1888–1943), Australian historian
- Charles Melbourne (1838–1891), Australian politician
- Colin Melbourne (1928–2009), English ceramicist and sculptor
- Hirini Melbourne (1949–2003), Māori academic, musician, composer and activist
- Jade Melbourne (born 2002), Australian basketball player
- Jimmy Melbourne (c. 1876–1937), Australian rules footballer
- Mark Melbourne (15 April 1984, Clonmel, Co. Tipperary) is an Irish rugby union player
- Max Melbourne (born 1998), English footballer

== See also ==
- Milbourne (disambiguation)
- Milburn (given name)
- Milburn (surname)
- Mel (given name)
