= Milburn (surname) =

Milburn is a surname. Its origin is English (Northumbria and Cumbria), and it is a habitational name from a place in Cumbria, named in Old English as 'millstream', from mylen 'mill' and burna 'stream'.

People with the surname include:

- Alan Milburn (born 1958), UK politician
- Amos Milburn (1927–1980), American R&B singer and pianist
- Barry Milburn (born 1943), New Zealand cricketer
- Clara Milburn (1883–1961), British diarist of life during the Second World War
- Colin Milburn (1941–1990), English Test match cricketer
- Darren Milburn (born 1977), Australian rules footballer
- George Milburn (1910–1980), English footballer
- Glyn Milburn (born 1971), American football player
- Jack Milburn (footballer) (1908–1979), English footballer
- Jackie Milburn (1924–1988), English footballer
- Jackie Milburn (footballer, born 1921) (1921–2006), English footballer
- Jeff Milburn, American professional driver and racing team owner
- Jim Milburn (1919–1985), English footballer
- Joel Milburn (born 1986), Australian sprinter
- Martina Milburn (born 1957), Chief Executive of the Prince's Trust
- Oliver Milburn (born 1973), English actor
- Richard Milburn, 19th century African-American composer
- Richard M. Milburn (1866–1915), American politician
- Rod Milburn (1950–1997), American hurdler
- Rowan Milburn (born 1977), New Zealand cricketer
- Stuart Milburn (born 1972), English cricketer

== See also ==
- Milburn (given name)
