= Jackie Milburn (disambiguation) =

Jackie Milburn (1924–1988) was an English footballer who played for Newcastle United and England.

Jackie Milburn or Jack Milburn may also refer to:

- Jack Milburn (footballer) (1908–1979), English footballer, Leeds United and manager of Bradford City
- Jackie Milburn (footballer, born 1921) (1921–2006), English footballer who played for Crook Town and Willington
