= Melbourne (disambiguation) =

Melbourne is the capital and most populous city of Victoria, Australia.

Melbourne or Melbourn may also refer to:

== Melbourne, Australia ==
- Melbourne central business district, the central area of metropolitan Melbourne
- City of Melbourne, a local government area
- Electoral district of Melbourne, an electorate of the Victorian Legislative Assembly
- Division of Melbourne, an electorate of Australia's federal parliament
- Anglican Diocese of Melbourne, church district

== Other places ==
- Mount Melbourne, Antarctica
- Melbourne, Nova Scotia, Canada
- Melbourne, Quebec, Canada
- Melbourne, Derbyshire, UK
- Melbourne, East Riding of Yorkshire, UK
- Melbourn, Cambridgeshire, UK, a village
  - Melbourn Rural District, Cambridgeshire
- Melbourne, Arkansas, U.S.
- Melbourne, Florida, U.S.
- Melbourne, Iowa, U.S.
- Melbourne, Kentucky, U.S.

== Sport ==
- Melbourne Football Club, a club in the Australian Football League
- North Melbourne Football Club, a club in the Australian Football League
- Melbourne Storm, a club in the National Rugby League

== Music ==
- Melbourne (album), an album by the Models
- Melbourne (song), a song by the Whitlams

== People ==
- Melbourne (name), a given name and a family name (including a list of people with the name)
- Peniston Lamb, 1st Viscount Melbourne (1745–1828)
- William Lamb, 2nd Viscount Melbourne (1779–1848)
- Frederick Lamb, 3rd Viscount Melbourne (1782–1853)

== Ships ==
- Melbourne, a mid-19th-century screw steamship, which was one of three used in the mail service between England and Australia run by the Australian Royal Mail Steam Navigation Company
- Melbourne, an iron-hull sailing ship that was later renamed Macquarie and eventually became Fortuna, a mechanised coal hulk in Sydney
- HMAS Melbourne (1912), a Town-class light cruiser launched in 1912
- HMAS Melbourne (R21), a Majestic-class light aircraft carrier acquired by the RAN in 1947
- HMAS Melbourne (FFG 05), an Adelaide-class guided missile frigate launched in 1989

== Other uses ==
- USS Melbourne, a fictional spaceship in the Star Trek: The Next Generation episode The Best of Both Worlds
- Portrait of Lord Melbourne, an 1805 painting by Thomas Lawrence

== See also ==
- Melbern, Ohio, U.S.
- Royal Melbourne (disambiguation)
