= Monty Lord =

British author and researcher (born 2005)

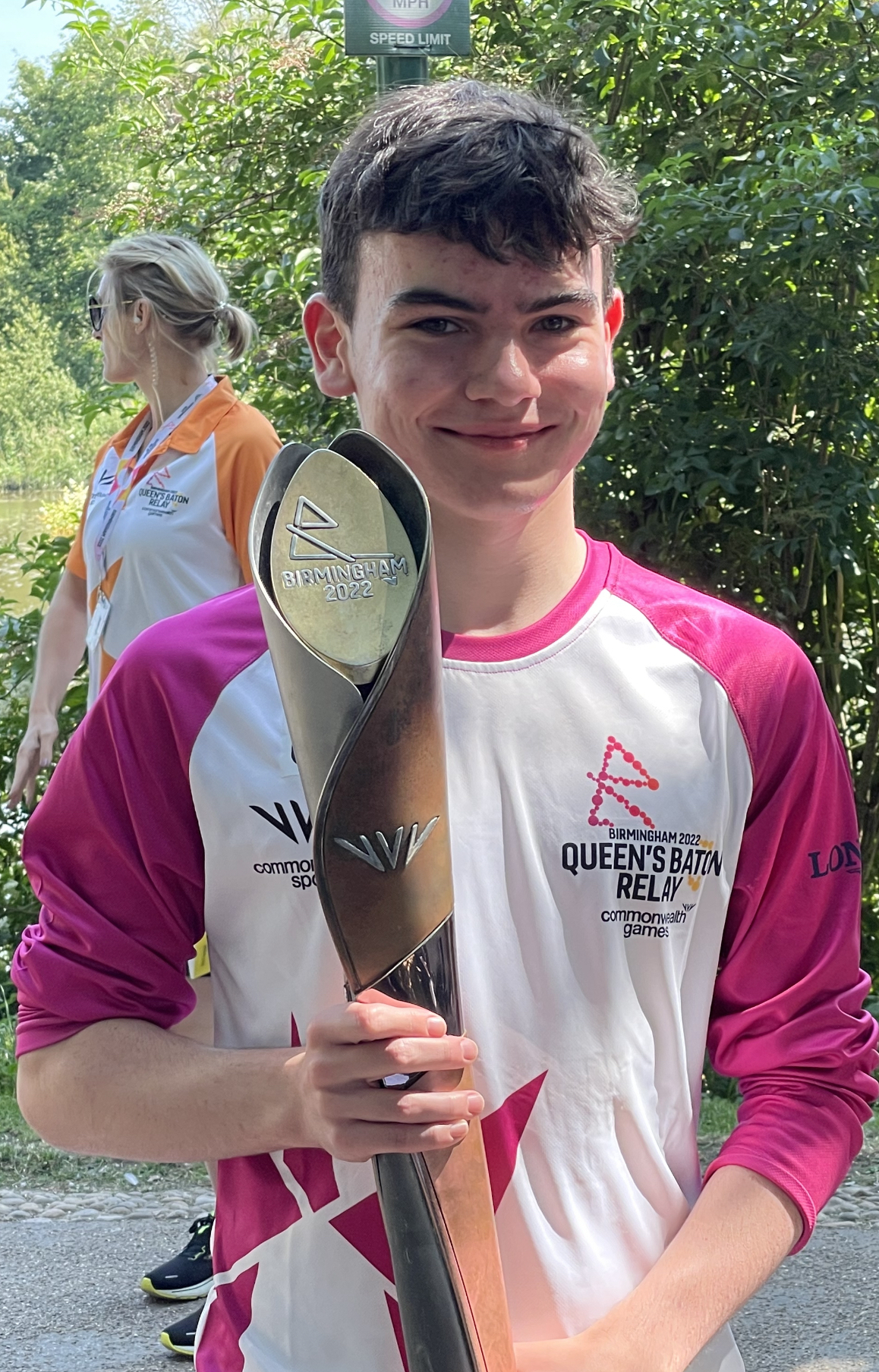
- Lord in 2022
- Born: Montgomery Lord; 2005 (age 20–21); Bolton, Greater Manchester, England
- Education: Bolton School; Runshaw College
- Occupations: Author; researcher
- Website: montylord.com

Montgomery Lord (born 2005) is a British author, mnemonist, and researcher.

Lord has been described in The Daily Telegraph as a "something of a polymath". He holds five Guinness World Records for memory challenges.

== Early life and education ==
Lord was born in 2005 in Bolton, Greater Manchester to Fabian Lord, a television producer. He was educated at Bolton School and became head boy at St. Joseph's RC High School He was a student at Runshaw College in Leyland, Lancashire. He now attends Cambridge University pursuing a degree in law after completing his college education.

Lord is interested in the martial art taekwondo, participating in national championships in Stratford-upon-Avon. He has played football for Bolton County Lightning.

== Career ==
In 2012, at the age of seven, Lord self-published his first children's fiction novel, Freaky School. The novel later became a bestseller and was well-received by authors such as Jeff Kinney. Lord cited Kinney, author of the Diary of a Wimpy Kid series, as his inspiration to write his book from the first-person perspective. Kinney and Lord met to discuss writing.

In May 2020, Monty Lord founded a charity called Young Active Minds, to alleviate social disparity in education by improving memory and learning processes.

In November 2020, Lord was presented with the British Citizen Youth Award for services to charity, by Greater Manchester Deputy Lieutenant Saeed Atcha. He later became an ambassador for the British Citizen Awards, being presented with his award at the Palace of Westminster in October 2021.

In March 2021, he received a Points of Light award from UK Prime Minister Boris Johnson in appreciation of his outstanding community engagement and charity efforts.

In May 2021, Lord was presented with The Diana Award in recognition of his contributions to society. He is also an anti-bullying ambassador with The Diana Award.

In August 2021, Lord was named by The Independent in their annual Happy List as in the top 50 inspirational people driving positive change in Britain.

Lord is also a former Royal Marine cadet. In January 2022, he sued the Preston Sea Cadets for breach of contract on behalf of himself and five other claimants after several complaints of bullying, harassment, and homophobic behavior at the sea cadets were made by cadets, staff, parents, and a trustee. He wrote a 312 pages report to Preston County Court claiming Preston Sea Cadets unit was "not fit for purpose" and sought damages under The Consumer Rights Act (2015). Later, he and other claimants received their requested payments for damages and court costs in an out-of-court settlement.

Lord holds five Guinness World Records which he received for various memory challenges.<ref="auto1"/> Lord has invented a memory technique.<ref="auto2"/> At the age of 14, he attempted his first world record after receiving financial assistance to complete a course in foundational psychology and memory from the University of Yale.

Lord now attends schools, teaching his memory recall techniques to children.

== Research ==
Lord completed his four-month study on the impacts of bedtime technology on the body's circadian rhythm and authored a 55,000-word thesis in the start of 2020. It discovered a statistically significant link between children who used technology in bed or at night and daytime somnolence.

In December 2020, Lord presented the findings of his research at the United Nations in Geneva. Previously, he has presented his research work to academics at the University of Manchester.

Lord is also known for raising awareness of the effects of mental health disorders in children and young people, developing an Amazon Alexa app to provide mental health advice to young people. He is a member of Greater Manchester Mental Health's CAMHS.Digital research team.

During the COVID-19 pandemic, he undertook a piece of independent research into the effects of COVID-19 on the mental health of children and young people.

== Awards and honors ==
- British Citizen Youth Award (2020)
- Fellow of the Royal Society of Arts (February 2021)
- Prime Minister's Points of Light Award (March 2021)
- The Diana Award (May 2021)
- NM2 Michaelmas Teacup for Caius Boat Club (December 2023)

== Bibliography ==
- Lord, Monty (2012). Freaky School
- Lord, Monty (2022). Bizarre laws & curious customs of the UK
