= Polio Children =

International non-governmental organization

- Founded: 2002
- Founders: Arun Patel; Mayoor Patel; Shirish Patel
- Type: NGO
- Registration no.: 1096394 (UK); 32-0070765 (USA)
- Location(s): Ilford, UK Rochester, USA
- Origins: Ilford, England (UK)
- Website: www.poliochildren.org

Polio Children is an international non-governmental organization which has fundraised over £1.3million to fund projects in India, Tanzania, South Sudan and Sierra Leone which enhance the welfare of children with poliomyelitis. The charity has provided scholarships, vocational training and material assistance to polio victims across the world to ensure they can live dignified, independent lives.

== Founding Trustees ==
Polio Children was founded in 2002 by Arun Patel, Mayoor Patel and Shirish Patel.

== Projects ==
Polio Children supports projects in India, Tanzania and South Sudan, with projects pending to begin in Sierra Leone.

=== India ===
Polio Children work in partnership with the Indiability Foundation to support the Sucheta Kriplani Shiksha Niketan (SKSN) Institute in Jodhpur, Rajasthan.

Kitchen built in Kwa Mkono Polio Camp, Tanzania

=== Tanzania ===
Polio Children also works in partnership with the Kwa Mkono Disabled Children’s Trust to support the Kwa Mkono Disabled Children's Centre (formerly known as The Kwa Mkono Polio Hostel).

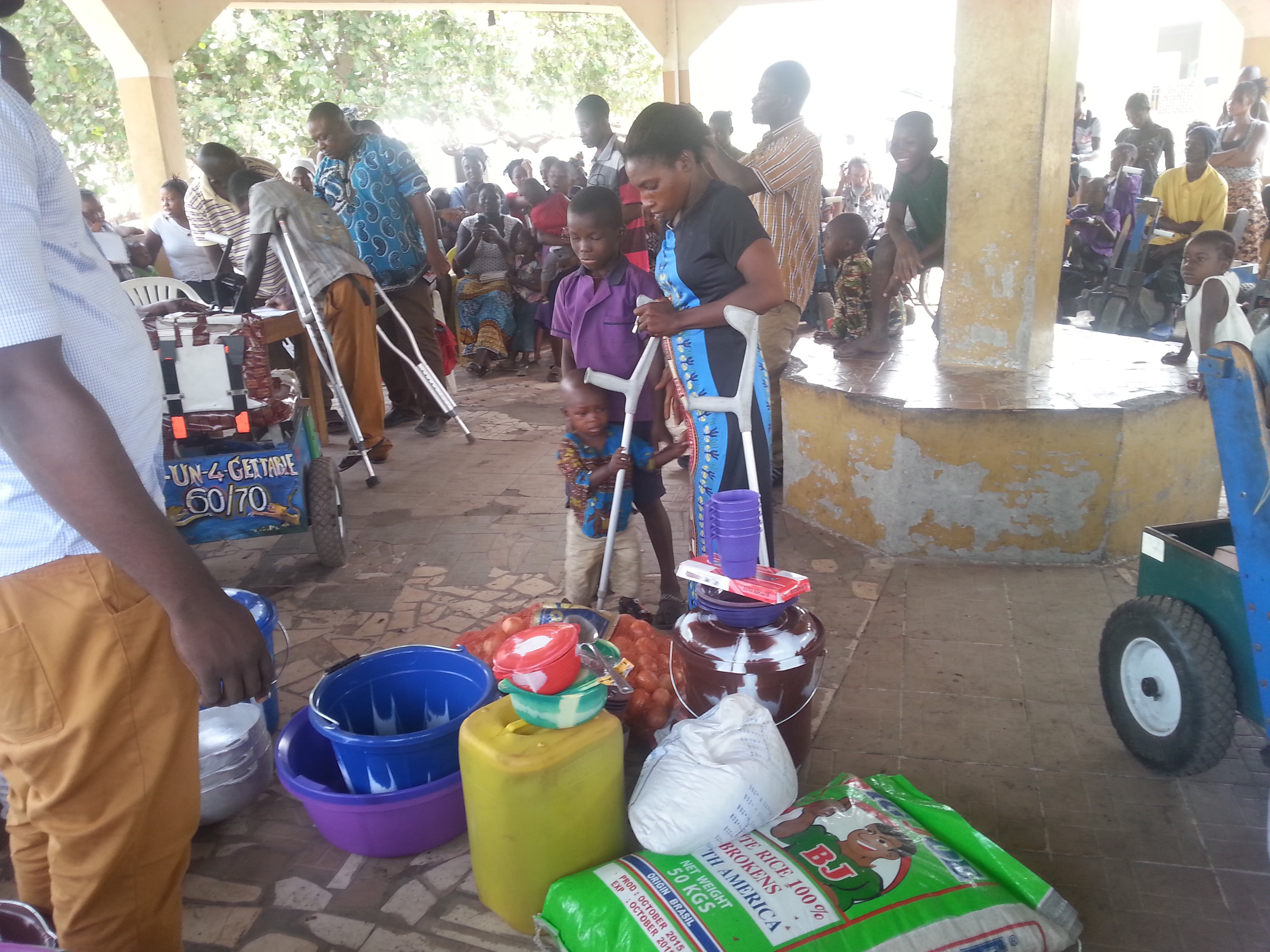
Polio sufferers at Magbenteh Polio Camp, Makeni receive humanitarian donation, 2016

=== South Sudan ===
Polio Children works with Building Minds in South Sudan (BMISS), a non-profit organisation that provides educational opportunities to villagers in the Republic of South Sudan. The organisation seeks to restore hope by providing an education for people adversely affected by conflict in Sudan.

=== Sierra Leone ===
Polio Children has worked with the Magbenteh Polio Camp in Makeni to establish self-sustaining revenue generating projects.

=== Kenya ===
In 2016, Polio Children worked in partnership with the Olympia Wafula Foundation, a charity established by paralympian Anne Wafula Strike, which promotes social inclusion and empowerment of disabled and disadvantaged persons. Together they provided tricycles for polio sufferers living in remote areas of Kenya.

== Awards and recognition ==
In 2012 the chairman, Arun Patel, was chosen as one of only 7 Paralympic torchbearers to carry the National Flame of England, and has been honoured by both the British Citizen Awards and the Redbridge Cultural Association for his philanthropic work with the charity. Arun has also been nominated and shortlisted for both the Asian Achievers Award (2008, 2015) and World of Children Awards (2014, 2015). In addition, his brother Mayoor Patel was also nominated for the British Polio Fellowship Awards in 'Helper of the Year' category in 2008. In November 2015, the UK Prime Minister David Cameron awarded Arun & Mayoor Patel the Points of Light Award to recognise the positive impact the charity has had on polio afflicted children across the world. The Prime Minister said:

"Arun and Mayoor Patel have seen first-hand the huge impact polio has on a child’s life and they have dedicated their lives to helping to overcome the difficulties they face. By making sure children with polio have the same chance of finishing their education as other children, and helping them to gain vocational skills, they make a huge difference in their lives. Over 1,000 children have received support and education through Polio Children, and I am delighted to recognise Arun and Mayoor as Points of Light for all that they have achieved."

In 2016, founding trustee Mayoor Patel was recognised in the British Citizen Awards. Mayoor Patel was awarded a BCA in the International Achievement category as a result of his endeavours to allow children disadvantaged by poverty to access university education.

Polio Children was selected as a winner at the 2016 Asian Voice Charity Awards powered by Charity Clarity in recognition of their fundraising endeavours to support their portfolio of projects. In July 2016, Polio Children was also a finalist in the Charity Initiative of the Year category of the British Indian Awards. The awards recognise the commitment and hard work of the Indian community in contributing to a better society.
