= Young People and Work =

2026 independent review

"Young People and Work", also known as the Milburn Review, is a 2026 independent review on NEETs in the United Kingdom. It was commissioned in 2025 by the Secretary of State for Work and Pensions, Pat McFadden and prepared by Alan Milburn.

== Background ==
The Department for Work and Pensions made a call for evidence from 16 December 2025 to 30 January 2026.

== Reception ==
Prime Minister Keir Starmer described the report as "sobering".
