= Xplode Magazine =

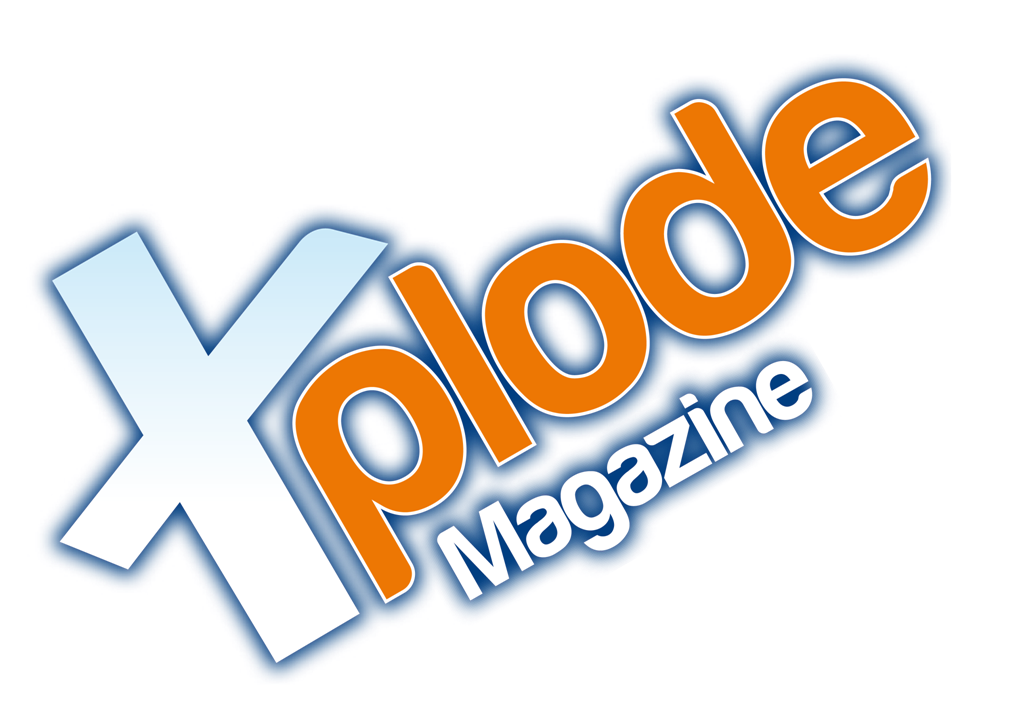
- Company type: Charity
- Industry: Media and Education
- Founded: 12 September 2011
- Headquarters: Bolton, England
- Key people: Saeed Atcha, managing editor = Chloe Bennett
- Website: xplode.co.uk

Xplode Magazine is a registered charity in the United Kingdom, formed on 13 February 2014. Before this, Xplode Magazine operated as a Constituted Community Group. Xplode Magazine is a volunteering and training charity. It was founded by Saeed Atcha. Xplode trains young people aged 12–22 in media, business, and life skills in order to develop their employability prospects. The young people then practice what they're taught through the creation of Xplode's actual publication, Xplode Magazine.

== Organisation ==
Xplode Magazine operates in Bolton, Bury, and Manchester City. The main objects of the charity are to provide advice, to assist and organize programmes of activities as a means of helping young people advance in life by developing their skills, capacities and abilities, relieve unemployment and provide recreational and leisure time activity in the interests of social welfare. Xplode Magazine also act as a platform for young people to develop business skills as part of their innovative non-formal education programmes.

Xplode Magazine's slogan is 'By Young People, For Young People'. Xplode's CEO and chairman, Saeed Atcha recently tweeted a new slogan to be used for the corporate side of Xplode, saying Xplode's Mission Statement is to 'Be Bold, Move Fast and Focus on your Impact'

Xplode's publication, Xplode Magazine has 35,105 readers. The free magazine is distributed to Bolton's schools, colleges, youth centres, ASDA Stores, Starbucks, Cineworld, Bolton Lads & Girls Club and local, independent stores. The magazine covers pop culture, showbiz and TV.

== Xplode XTRA ==
In a press release, Xplode Magazine talked about the launch of 'Xplode XTRA' which is made up of two strands; Vlogging, with a new YouTube channel housing Music and Film reviews as well as ‘How-To’ and other videos, and a radio stream, consisting of non-stop hit music and showbiz news which will be linked with a brand new app bringing the Xplode portfolio together.

== Activities ==
Xplode's setting mimics a youth club where young people meet, make friends and socialise, and participate in various activities. Prime Minister David Cameron gave the charity's CEO, Saeed Atcha a Point of Light award and applauded the partnerships with Telefónica O2, ASDA, Cineworld and Domino's Pizza. Other partnerships include UnLtd and Santander
