= Martina Milburn =

British charity worker

Dame Martina Milburn DCVO CBE
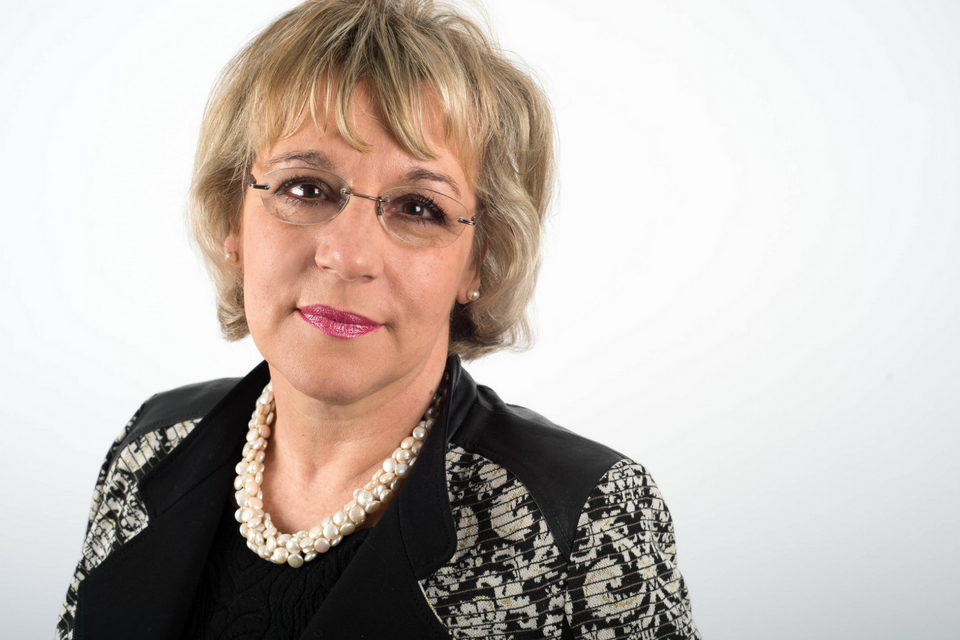

Chair of the Social Mobility Commission
- In office 13 July 2018 – 29 April 2020
- Appointed by: Theresa May
- Prime Minister: Theresa May; Boris Johnson
- Preceded by: Alan Milburn
- Succeeded by: Sandra Wallace and Steven Cooper

Personal details
- Born: Martina Jane Milburn; September 1957 (age 68)
- Known for: Charity leadership
- Awards: Dame Commander of the Royal Victorian Order; Commander of the Most Excellent Order of the British Empire

Dame Martina Jane Milburn, DCVO, CBE (born September 1957) is a British charity manager. She was the chief executive of The Prince's Trust UK from 2004 to 2017, and group chief executive until 2022. Milburn was Chair of the Social Mobility Commission from 2018 to 2020.

== Career ==
Milburn started a career as a journalist, but then worked freelance for a number of charities including CAFOD. She also worked as a researcher on a number of BBC television appeals, including Challenge Anneka from Malawi, Going Live! and Blue Peter specials from Jamaica.

In 1993 she became the chief executive of the Association of Spinal Injury Research Rehabilitation and Reintegration (ASPIRE) charity for seven years, where she ensured that the Aspire National Training Centre was completed on time and on budget. In July 2000 she became the chief executive of the BBC Children in Need Appeal, serving until 2004.

In May 2004 Milburn became chief executive of The Prince's Trust, succeeding Sir Tom Shebbeare who had been at The Prince's Trust for 16 years. Milburn was appointed group chief executive (covering the UK, Australia, Canada, New Zealand, United States and International) in 2017 and retired from the position in 2022.

Milburn was a trustee of Media Trust, the UK's leading communications charity, from October 2009 to May 2012.

She was appointed Chair of the Social Mobility Commission in 2018, serving two years until May 2020.

As of 2023 she holds active positions at the Windsor Leadership Trust and Dial Global Limited.

== Honours ==
In the 2012 New Year Honours, Milburn was appointed Commander of the Order of the British Empire (CBE) for services to charity. In the 2017 New Year Honours, she was appointed Dame Commander of the Royal Victorian Order (DCVO) in recognition of her service as chief executive of The Prince's Trust Group.
