= St Joseph's Roman Catholic High School, Horwich =

Coordinates: 53.585°N 2.528°W

St Joseph's Roman Catholic High School
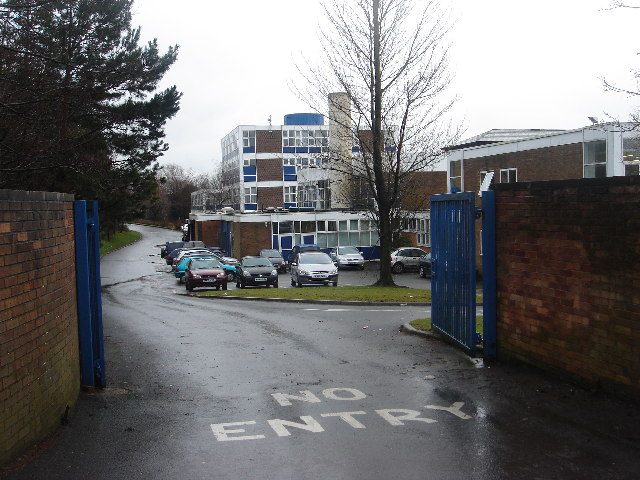

Location
- Chorley New Road; Horwich, Greater Manchester, BL6 6HW; England

Information
- Type: Voluntary Aided Comprehensive
- Motto: Justitia Sine Timore (Be Just and Fear Not)
- Religious affiliation: Roman Catholic
- Established: 5 November 1963
- Local authority: Bolton
- Department for Education URN: 105262 Tables
- Ofsted: Reports
- Headteacher: Tony McCabe
- Gender: Mixed
- Age: 11 to 16
- Enrolment: 1005
- Capacity: 1050
- Colours: Blue & Silver
- Website: www.stjosephsbolton.org.uk

St Joseph's Roman Catholic High School and Sports College is a voluntary aided comprehensive school located in Horwich, Greater Manchester, England. It is under trusteeship of the Roman Catholic Diocese of Salford and is maintained by Bolton Metropolitan Borough Council.

On 2 June 2020, the school was formally admitted as a member to the worldwide UNESCO Associated Schools Network.

The school offers GCSEs as programmes of study for pupils.

== Admissions ==
As of 2023 the school had 1005 pupils within the age range of 11-16. The school is in the trusteeship of the Diocese of Salford, established in 1963.

== Headteachers ==
- 1963–1975: John Yates
- 1975–1991: G. Eric Hester
- 1991–1995: Gerard Boyle
- 1995–2013: Leo Conley
- 2013–2017: Richard Woods
- 2017–present: Tony McCabe

== School performance and inspections ==
As of 2023, the school's most recent inspection by Ofsted was in 2022, with a judgement of Requires Improvement. In 2025 this was upgraded to Good.

== Buildings ==
A new £3,000,000 wing of the school was opened during the summer term of 2020. This created the capacity for a further 10 classrooms, 2 ICT rooms, a large library and drama studio.

== Welfare ==
On 4 June 2020, St Joseph's was awarded the Teach Well School Gold Award from the Teach Well Alliance in recognition of the work it undertook to take care of the physical and mental wellbeing of its staff and students during the coronavirus pandemic.

== Notable former pupils ==
- Lewis Alessandra, professional footballer who has played for several EFL sides
- Vernon Kay, British TV presenter
- Monty Lord, World memory champion (5 Guinness World Records) and bestselling author
- Phil Clarke, Great Britain Rugby league captain and Sky Sports commentator
- Peter Anglesea, Sale Sharks rugby union former captain and head coach
- Sean Long, former rugby league footballer, most notable for playing for St. Helens
- Jordan Flores, professional footballer who has played in England, Sweden and Ireland
- Adam Senior, footballer who plays as a defender for Bolton Wanderers
- Peter Morrison, footballer and then an agent following retirement
