= Child Poverty Act 2010 =

Act of the Parliament of the United Kingdom

Child Poverty Act 2010 (Note: Section 32.)
- Act of Parliament
- Parliament of the United Kingdom
- Long title: An Act to set targets relating to the eradication of child poverty, and to make other provision about child poverty
- Citation: 2010 c. 9
- Introduced by: Stephen Timms (Commons); Lord McKenzie of Luton (Lords)
- Territorial extent: England and Wales; Scotland; Northern Ireland; (Note: Section 30.)

Dates
- Royal assent: 25 March 2010
- Commencement: 25 March 2010 (except part 2 and section 26); 25 May 2010 (part 2 and section 26); (Note: Section 31.)
Other legislation
Amends	Education Act 1996

Status: Amended

History of passage through Parliament

Text of statute as originally enacted

Revised text of statute as amended

The Child Poverty Act 2010 (c. 9), later amended to Life Chances Act 2010, is an act of the Parliament of the United Kingdom "to set targets relating to the eradication of child poverty, and to make other provision about child poverty". More specifically, the act has been summarised as comprising "a new set of legal duties for the [UK] government of the day to take action to meet four income targets for ending child poverty by 2020 and to minimise 'socio-economic disadvantage' for children."

The four income targets all related to median UK household income, and were as follows:

Measure	Target
Relative low income	Less than 10% of children living in households with an income below 60% of the 2020 median (Note: 10% as opposed to the 5% absolute low income target, taking into account that by 2020 the median could have moved upwards, making a target related to the median more challenging to reach.)
Combined low income and material deprivation	Less than 5% of children living in households with both (a) an income below 70% of the 2020 median, and (b) material deprivation (i.e. the inability to afford goods and activities typical in UK society)
Absolute low income	Less than 5% of children living in households with an income below 60% of the 2010 median (Note: Taking into account any change to the value of UK money between 2010 and 2020 (i.e. inflation).)
Persistent poverty	Less than 7% of children living in households with an income below 60% of the median in the given year for at least three out of a four-year period (Note: Target proposed following a consultation that ended in August 2014.)

== Background ==
The act provided a statutory basis to the commitment made by Tony Blair's Labour Government in 1999 to eradicate child poverty by 2020, which the Conservatives in Opposition under David Cameron had accepted as a "shared goal" ("an aspiration, not a pledge") in 2006. The proposed legislation was first read as the Child Poverty Bill in June 2009. Its sponsors were Labour politicians Stephen Timms, then Financial Secretary to the Treasury, and Bill McKenzie.

In its comprehensive, ambitious scope and focus on poorer children, the Act has been compared to educational proposals made in Australia over a similar timeframe by the 2011 Gonski Report.

== Other provisions ==
=== Child Poverty Commission ===
Chapter 9, section 8 of the Act required the establishment of an independent Child Poverty Commission to oversee progress towards the targets, which via the Welfare Reform Act 2012 became the Child Poverty and Social Mobility Commission. This section of the Act was later revised by chapter 7, section 6 of the Welfare Reform and Work Act 2016, which renamed the body as the Social Mobility Commission.

== Criticism ==
The act received Royal Assent on 25 March 2010, six weeks before the 2010 general election which brought to an end 13 years of Labour government. A paper published in the Political Quarterly in 2012 described it as "[o]ne of Labour's parting shots before leaving office": "Although passed with cross-party support, the Child Poverty Act 2010 was clearly something of a stitch up, intended to embarrass an incoming government if it tried to shirk its commitments or move the goal posts."

As noted by the politically independent but Conservative-leaning think tank the Centre for Social Justice (CSJ) in 2016, the targets had been deliberately envisaged as being impossible to delay or quietly lay aside. In a meeting with the Work and Pensions Select Committee in June 2009, Timms had explained: "In the way the Bill has been drafted, the commitment to hit those four targets is binding by 2020. [...T]he only way to avert the possibility of a judicial review forcing a future government to take whatever steps are needed to hit the target would be for the legislation to be repealed." Timms further explained how this differed from the Climate Change Act 2008, as "with the Climate Change Act, there is there a mechanism to delay the target or to recognise that economic circumstances might make it impossible to deliver that. That provision is not in this Bill."

== Abandonment ==
It became clear to Parliament with the 2012/13 child poverty data that "under any plausible scenario, the [act's] 2020 targets will be missed". 2013 was a turning point due to a renewed rise in middle incomes after the Great Recession while incomes continued to fall at the bottom, rising pensioner poverty, and rising poverty among social housing tenants.

The targets were formally abandoned on 1 July 2015 when the Department for Work and Pensions and the Work and Pensions Secretary Iain Duncan Smith (one of the CSJ's co-founders) announced "a new and strengthened approach to tracking the life chances of Britain’s most disadvantaged children".

The act was not formally repealed. However, the announcement was liveblogged under the title "Iain Duncan Smith announces Child Poverty Act being scrapped" in the Guardian.

== Bibliography ==
- Bamfield, Louise (2012). "Child Poverty and Social Mobility: Taking the Measure of the Coalition's 'New Approach'". Political Quarterly. 83 (4): 830–837. doi:10.1111/j.1467-923x.2012.02418.x.
- Maslen, Joseph (2019). "Cracking the Code: The Social Mobility Commission and Education Policy Discourse". Journal of Education Policy. 34 (5): 599–612. doi:10.1080/02680939.2018.1449891. S2CID 149726651. Archived from the original on 12 July 2021.Maslen, Joseph (5 April 2018). "Accepted manuscript". Journal of Education Policy. Institutional open access repository: 1–14. Archived from the original on 12 July 2021.
