= Royal Melbourne =

The phrase Royal Melbourne can be used in several contexts:

The following are organisations, institutions, and places in Melbourne, Australia:

- Royal Melbourne Golf Club
- Royal Botanic Gardens, Melbourne
- Royal Melbourne Hospital
- Royal Melbourne Yacht Squadron
- Royal Melbourne Philharmonic
- Melbourne Royal Show, formerly the Royal Melbourne Show

== See also ==
- Melbourne (disambiguation)
