= Millburn =

Millburn may refer to:

== Places ==
=== United Kingdom ===
- Millburn, Inverness, an area of Inverness, Scotland
- Millburn, County Londonderry, a townland in County Londonderry, Northern Ireland

=== United States ===
- Millburn, Illinois, an unincorporated community in Illinois, United States
- Millburn, New Jersey, a township in New Jersey, United States

== Other ==
- Millburn Academy, secondary school in Inverness
- Millburn distillery, distillery in Inverness
- Millburn High School, public high school in Millburn, New Jersey
- Millburn Magic, women's soccer team in New Jersey
- Millburn Park, Vale of Leven F.C. football ground
- Millburn (NJT station), New Jersey Transit station in Millburn, New Jersey
- Millburn Township Public Schools, school district in Millburn, New Jersey

== See also ==
- Milburn (disambiguation)
