= Greg Indruk =

American politician

Member of New Hampshire House of Representatives for Hillsborough 34
- In office December 5, 2018 – December 1, 2020
- Succeeded by: Melbourne Moran

Personal details
- Party: Democratic

Greg Indruk is an American politician. He was a member of the New Hampshire House of Representatives and represented Hillsborough 34th district.
