= Ann-Marie Wilson =

British anti-FGM activist

Ann-Marie Wilson MBE is a British psychologist and anti-FGM activist. She founded 28 Too Many, a UK-based organisation that aims to eradicate female genital mutilation. She also speaks out against violence against women.

== FGM ==
Wilson first came across FGM (female genital mutilation) while working in a refugee camp in Sudan in 2005. She then started dedicating herself to working against FGM.

Wilson worked with the government of the United Kingdom to encourage over 350 faith leaders to sign a pledge against FGM in 2014. It was hosted by Prime Minister David Cameron.

=== 28 Too Many ===
Wilson founded 28 Too Many in 2010. It works with 28 countries in Africa where FGM had been practiced. 28 Too Many provides research, knowledge and tools in eradicating FGM. The organization also works with the diaspora in the UK.

=== Overcoming ===
Wilson authored Overcoming (2021, Lion Hudson: ISBN 9781800300071). It contains the experience of over 3,000 survivors of FGM.

== Recognition ==
Wilson was given a British Citizen Award in the "International Achievement" category in 2015.

Wilson was appointed Member of the Order of the British Empire (MBE) in the 2023 New Year Honours for services to the prevention of violence against women and girls.
