= Saeed Atcha =

British politician

Saeed Atcha MBE DL
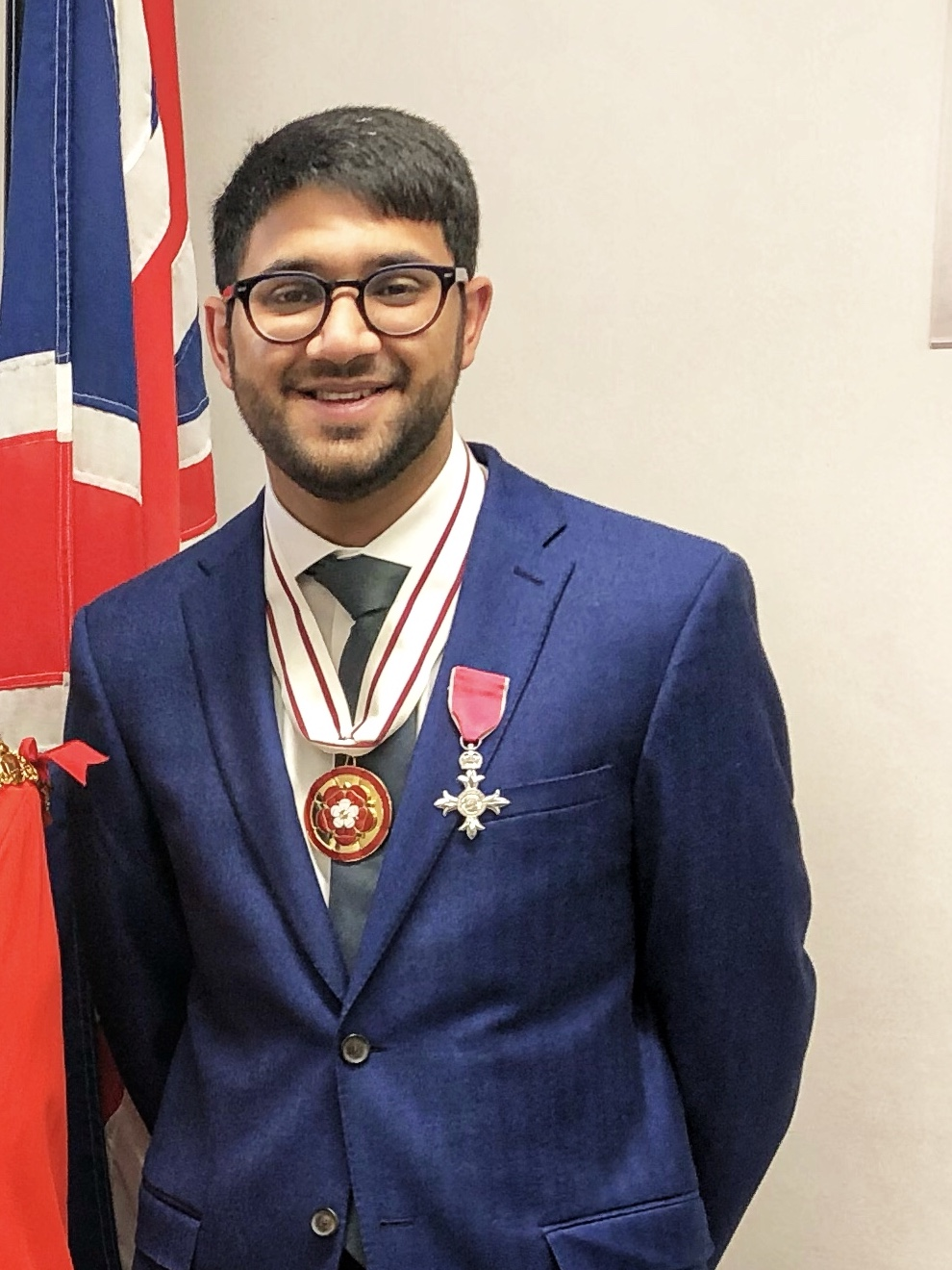

Deputy Lieutenant of Greater Manchester
- Incumbent
- Assumed office July 2019
- Appointed by: Sir Warren James Smith

Commissioner, Young People & Vulnerable Groups Social Mobility Commission
- Incumbent
- Assumed office October 2018
- Prime Minister: Theresa May; Boris Johnson

Personal details
- Born: Saeed Atcha; July 1996 (age 30) Deane, Bolton, England
- Spouse: Maryam Kara
- Education: Manchester Metropolitan University
- Known for: Charity leadership
- Awards: Member of the Most Excellent Order of the British Empire

Saeed Atcha MBE DL (born July 1996), is Chief executive of the youth-led charity Youth Leads UK. Atcha is currently a Deputy Lieutenant of Greater Manchester and a Commissioner of the Social Mobility Commission.

== Early life ==
Atcha was born in Deane, Bolton. He then moved to Hulton and attended Ladybridge High School. Atcha went on to study Public Relations at Manchester Metropolitan University.

== Career ==
Atcha founded the charity Youth Leads UK, supporting disadvantaged young people in Greater Manchester to access volunteering opportunities and skills development programmes. He was trustee of the Prince of Wales’ charity Step Up To Serve. Atcha was appointed Deputy lieutenant of Manchester by Lord Lieutenant of Greater Manchester in June 2019. Atcha is currently Associate Non-Executive Director of Pennine Care NHS Foundation Trust He is also currently trustee of Generation UK & Ireland. Atcha is patron of the East of England's Children's charity, Ormiston Families.

== Honours ==
Atcha was the awarded an MBE for services to young people and the community in Greater Manchester in the 2019 New Year Honours. He was the youngest recipient on the list. Atcha was given a Point of Light award by the Prime Minister, David Cameron for his work establishing the Xplode Magazine.
