= Social Mobility Commission =

UK non-departmental public body

The Social Mobility Commission (SMC), formerly the Social Mobility and Child Poverty Commission (2012–2016) and originally the Child Poverty Commission (2010–2012), is an independent advisory non-departmental public body of the UK Government. Originally sponsored by the Department for Education (DfE), the commission moved to the Cabinet Office on 1 April 2021. It now operates under the sponsorship of the Minister for Women and Equalities as part of the Equality Hub, which also includes the Government Equalities Office, the Race Disparity Unit, and the Disability Unit.

The SMC was established under the Life Chances Act 2010 (formerly the Child Poverty Act 2010), and its statutory role is to monitor progress in improving social mobility in the UK and to promote social mobility in England.

In September 2026, the Government announced the Social Mobility Commission will be abolished. Legislation is required to formalise this.

== Current Commissioners ==
As of August 2024 the commissioners are:

- Alun Francis, Chair
- Resham Kotecha, Vice-chair
- Rob Wilson, Vice-chair
- Raghib Ali, Commissioner
- Ryan Henson, Commissioner
- Parminder Kohli, Commissioner
- Tina Stowell, Commissioner

== Remit ==
The SMC's stated aim is to "create a United Kingdom where the circumstances of birth do not determine outcomes in life". Four specific responsibilities are listed on the SMC's website. These are:

- publishing an annual report setting out its views on the progress made towards improving social mobility in the United Kingdom.
- promoting social mobility in England, for example, by supporting employers, the professions, universities and schools to play their part in promoting social mobility.
- carrying out and publishing research in relation to social mobility.
- providing advice to ministers (at their request) on how to improve social mobility in England, with this advice then being published.

Until 2020, the Commission described its role as "monitor[ing] progress towards improving social mobility in the UK, and promot[ing] social mobility in England". Because education in the United Kingdom is a devolved matter with each of the countries of the United Kingdom having separate systems under separate governments, the SMC has a remit to promote social mobility in England but only to monitor progress towards improving social mobility in the other countries of the United Kingdom. In Scotland an equivalent body is the Social Justice and Fairness Commission announced by Nicola Sturgeon as First Minister of the Scottish Government in April 2019.

As the Social Mobility and Child Poverty (SMCP) Commission, its objective was to "monitor the progress of government and others in improving social mobility and reducing child poverty in the United Kingdom".

== Creation and Renaming ==
The body was created by chapter 9, section 8 of the Child Poverty Act 2010 (also known as the life chances Act), which required the establishment of an independent Child Poverty Commission to monitor the effectiveness of the Government's then-yet-to-be-published Child Poverty Strategy. It was renamed as the Social Mobility and Child Poverty (SMCP) Commission by the Welfare Reform Act 2012, and its name was changed to the Social Mobility Commission by chapter 7, section 6 of the Welfare Reform and Work Act 2016. From 2012 to 2017 the Chair of the commission was Alan Milburn.

=== Renaming as the SMCP Commission ===
In April 2011, when the Government's Child Poverty Strategy was published, it announced (p. 22, §1.41; p. 66, §5.21) that the Child Poverty Act would be amended so that the Child Poverty Commission would "be replaced by a new Social Mobility and Child Poverty Commission". The commission's "broader scope" incorporating social mobility was described in the Strategy as "the Government's new approach", designed "to ensure that the Commission considers the issue of child poverty within the wider context of children's life chances and inter-generational poverty" and "the crucial links between child poverty, children's life chances and social mobility". The SMCP Commission's role was described as being "to monitor progress against the broad range of child poverty, life chances and social mobility indicators, towards the end goal of eradicating child poverty."

=== Renaming as the SMC ===
In July 2015 a Commons statement on the renaming of the commission as the SMC was made by Iain Duncan Smith (Note: Duncan Smith had held roles on Cabinet Committees on Social Justice and Social Mobility as, respectively, Chair and vice-chair.) as Work and Pensions Secretary: "Governments will no longer focus on just moving families above a poverty line. Instead, we want to focus on making a meaningful change to children’s lives by extending opportunity for all, so that both they and their children can escape from the cycle of poverty and improve their life chances."

=== Academic critiques of renaming ===
In semantic terms the 2011 name-change was criticised for putting together the terms "child poverty" and "social mobility" without addressing the potential "internal contradictions" of trying to deal with both at the same time, or specifying "the relative priority or importance of the two issues".

In a political studies paper published in the Political Quarterly in 2012, the renaming was interpreted ideologically as a covert rejection of any aspirations regarding child poverty. Noting the commission's shift from child poverty per se to "the broad range of child poverty, life chances and social mobility indicators", the paper argued that: "While continuing to pay lip service to the goal of ending child poverty, much of the government's energy has been devoted to trying to redefine the problem of poverty, moving beyond what it sees as a narrow preoccupation with relative low income." Severely criticising this scope creep as a climbdown from the principles of the Child Poverty Act, the paper argued: "In truth, neither the letter nor the spirit of the law has been fully adhered to, and only a lack of sustained public or media attention has spared the government the embarrassment of anyone noticing how far its policy and strategy falls short of its professed goals."

Apart from this push factor away from ending child poverty, it has also been theorised sociologically that the pull towards headlining social mobility in government policy during the 2010s occurred due to growing "underclass anxiety" about the political and social actions of the economically disadvantaged, especially following the 2011 England riots and latterly the vote for Brexit in the 2016 EU referendum. In this context, the SMC has been seen to be part of a trend among governmental agencies towards portraying social mobility simplistically (and conveniently, in this view) as a set of "component pieces which can be tackled with specific ameliorant policies", and shying away from acknowledging (more accurately, in this view) how "the class system" creates a fundamental structure of inequality. This trend in governmental outlook has been critiqued as "the New Mobility discourse".

== December 2017 – December 2018 ==
=== Resignations ===
In December 2017 Milburn and his three fellow Commissioners resigned. Milburn's letter of resignation, dated 2 December, explained to Prime Minister Theresa May the reasons for their decision, including roles on the Commission being vacant for almost two years and his belief that the Government was "unable to devote the necessary energy and focus to the social mobility agenda". The letter was published in The Guardian.

=== The Future of the Social Mobility Commission ===
In March 2018 the Commons Education Committee published The Future of the Social Mobility Commission. The report recommended that the commission should be renamed as the Social Justice Commission, and that there should be a minister for social justice/social mobility. It also recommended that the commission should always have at least seven members in addition to the chair, and have an extended remit to:

- publish social justice impact assessments on government policies and proposals
- actively advise Ministers on how to improve social justice in England, rather than advising only at their request

Robert Halfon as the committee's Chair argued that the extended remit would give the Commission "real teeth" as "a new social justice body in the heart of Downing Street with the levers and powers to coordinate action to drive forward initiatives and implement solutions". He argued that renaming the SMC as the Social Justice Commission would "ensure [that the Commission is] not just focusing on those already on the ladder but bringing them to the ladder and making sure we are there if they fall".

=== Government response ===
In May 2018 the Government published its response, which rejected the committee's recommendations.

Recommendation	Response	Explanation
that the commission should be renamed as the Social Justice Commission.	Rejected	that the terms 'social justice' and 'social mobility' are "intrinsically linked": "Social justice is a term which has come to denote a specific focus on the most deprived in society, making sure they have the opportunities to succeed enjoyed by others and are not held back by their circumstances. Social mobility–making sure that someone's background does not determine their future chances in life–therefore must have social justice at its core" (p. 6).
that the commission should have an extended remit to publish social justice impact assessments on government policies and proposals, and actively advise Ministers on how to improve social justice in England, rather than advising only at their request.	Rejected	"that [government] departments themselves are best placed to consider the impact of policy and legislative proposals on social justice, as they are the experts on their policy areas" (p. 7).
that there should be a minister for social justice/social mobility.	Rejected	that the responsibility was already covered by Nadhim Zahawi as Parliamentary Under-Secretary of State for Children and Families, and that Damian Hinds as Education Secretary was "absolutely committed" to social mobility, having previously chaired the All-Party Parliamentary Group for Social Mobility (p. 9).

The Government's response was criticised by Halfon: "We called for a beefed-up Commission with the resources, direction and teeth needed to tackle society's burning injustices but, in its response, the Government has sadly failed to seize this opportunity."

=== Relaunch ===
Alongside its response, the Government announced via Hinds that Martina Milburn (not a family relation of Alan Milburn) was its preferred candidate to succeed Alan Milburn as the Chair of the commission. She was confirmed as chair in July, having been questioned by the Education Committee that month. Twelve fellow commissioners were appointed in October.

In December 2018 the SMC was relaunched, with an announcement that the commission had been awarded an additional £2m of funding by the DfE.

=== Remuneration of Chair ===
Upon the announcement of Martina Milburn as the Government's preferred candidate in May 2018 the role of chair was announced as unremunerated, as had been the case under Alan Milburn. However, upon the relaunch of the SMC in December 2018 it was announced that, in accordance with the greater responsibilities arising from the commission's new budget, the Education Secretary had decided to remunerate the role.

== Criticism ==
=== Political ===
In June 2019 the SMC was criticised by the Education Committee. Alleged failings included a lack of diversity in its commissioners, an over-emphasis on research rather than action, and a lack of contact with the Education Secretary.

=== Academic ===
The commission has been praised for identifying "the social closure at the upper echelons of society and the isolation of those at the bottom" as key issues, thereby "recognising where the real 'problem of mobility' lies". However, it has been criticised for apparent naivety in its individualistic belief in "the possibility of [personal] exertion generating social mobility" and consequent reliance on "individualistic explanations [of how to improve social mobility] based on personal qualities and aspirations".

It has also been criticised for viewing education as a silver bullet for social mobility, and therefore focusing excessively on school effectiveness and the behaviour-management of pupils, teachers and parents. A critical discourse analysis of Commission's report Cracking the Code published in the Journal of Education Policy in 2018 found that its recommendations relied heavily on the 'marginal gains' philosophy associated with Dave Brailsford, and questioned the implementation of such a philosophy in everyday school life.

It had earlier been noted that the New Mobility discourse was concerned with upward mobility among the deserving poor without properly considering the accompanying need for downward mobility among the undeserving rich. This lack was addressed by the commission's report Downward Mobility, Opportunity Hoarding and the Glass Floor, which acknowledged and discussed the issue (pp. i–ii).

== Social Mobility Index and Opportunity Areas ==
=== Social Mobility Index ===
In January 2016 the Commission produced a Social Mobility Index of children's life chances in different local authority areas, including data published as a MS Excel spreadsheet, with an update to the data published in a similar spreadsheet in November 2017. The data was translated by Parliament into a "Social Mobility Index by Constituency" in October 2018.

=== Opportunity Areas ===
The commission's Index was also used by the DfE to designate "opportunity areas" that would receive extra government funding "to address the biggest challenges they face". Six opportunity areas were announced in October 2016 (West Somerset, Norwich, Blackpool, Scarborough/North Yorkshire Coast), Derby and Oldham) and a further six in January 2017 (Bradford, Doncaster, Fenland & East Cambridgeshire, Hastings, Ipswich and Stoke-on-Trent).

In October 2017 the DfE published a "delivery plan" for each opportunity area:

- Blackpool
- Bradford
- Derby
- Doncaster
- Fenland and East Cambridgeshire
- Hastings
- Ipswich
- North Yorkshire Coast
- Norwich
- Oldham
- Stoke-on-Trent
- West Somerset

An Evaluation of the "set-up phase" of the opportunity areas programme was published alongside a Selection of Case Studies in October 2018.

Although only indirectly responsible for the scheme, the SMC maintained an active interest, visiting Blackpool and Oldham as part of a "north west tour" in October 2019.

== Other publications ==
Publications produced by the commission are searchable on its website.

=== Annual reports ===
The commission has produced "State of the Nation" reports for 2013, 2014, 2015, 2016, 2017 and 2018–19.

=== Single-issue reports published as the Social Mobility and Child Poverty Commission ===
- Mapping the Occupational Destinations of New Graduates (October 2013)
- Lessons from London Schools for Attainment Gaps and Social Mobility (June 2014)
- Elitist Britain? (August 2014)
- Cracking the Code: How Schools Can Improve Social Mobility (October 2014)
- Escape Plan: Understanding Who Progresses from Low Pay and Who Gets Stuck (November 2014, Resolution Foundation report in association with the Social Mobility and Child Poverty Commission)
- Downward Mobility, Opportunity Hoarding and the Glass Floor (June 2015)
- Elitist Scotland? (December 2015, with David Hume Institute)
- Apprenticeships, Young People, and Social Mobility (March 2016)

=== Single-issue reports published as the SMC prior to December 2017 resignations ===
- The Childhood Origins of Social Mobility: Socio-Economic Inequalities and Changing Opportunities (June 2016)
- Socio-Economic Diversity in Life Sciences and Investment Banking (July 2016)
- Social and Ethnic Inequalities in Choice Available and Choices Made at Age 16 (December 2016)
- Ethnicity, Gender and Social Mobility (December 2016)
- Social Mobility, the Class Pay Gap and Intergenerational Worklessness: New Insights from the Labour Force Survey (January 2017)
- Helping Parents to Parent (February 2017)
- The Impacts of Family Support on Access to Homeownership for Young People in the UK (March 2017)
- Time for Change: An Assessment of Government Policies on Social Mobility 1997 to 2017 (June 2017)
- The Great Escape? Low Pay and Progression in the UK's Labour Market (October 2017)

=== Single-issue reports published following December 2018 relaunch ===
- Social Mobility Barometer: Public Attitudes to Social Mobility in the UK (December 2018)
- The Adult Skills Gap: Is Falling Investment in UK Adults Stalling Social Mobility? (January 2019)
- Elitist Britain 2019 (June 2019, with Sutton Trust)
- An Unequal Playing Field: Extra-Curricular Activities, Soft Skills and Social Mobility (July 2019)
