= Welfare Reform and Work Act 2016 =

Act of the Parliament of the United Kingdom

Welfare Reform and Work Act 2016 (Note: Section 37.)
- Act of Parliament
- Parliament of the United Kingdom
- Long title: An Act to make provision about reports on progress towards full employment and the apprenticeships target; to make provision about reports on the effect of certain support for troubled families; to make provision about life chances; to make provision about the benefit cap; to make provision about social security and tax credits; to make provision for loans for mortgage interest and other liabilities; and to make provision about social housing rents.
- Citation: 2016 c. 7
- Introduced by: Iain Duncan Smith (Commons); Lord Freud (Lords)
- Territorial extent: England and Wales; Scotland; Northern Ireland; (Note: Section 35.)

Dates
- Royal assent: 16 March 2016
- Commencement: Various (Note: Section 36.)
Other legislation
Amends	Social Security Administration Act 1992; Jobseekers Act 1995
Amended by	Universal Credit (Removal of Two Child Limit) Act 2026
Relates to	Child Poverty Act 2010

Status: Amended

History of passage through Parliament

Text of statute as originally enacted

Revised text of statute as amended

The Welfare Reform and Work Act 2016 (c. 7) is an act of the Parliament of the United Kingdom. It was introduced into the House of Commons on 9 July 2015 by Iain Duncan Smith and received Royal assent in March 2016.

== Background ==
The act implements policies that were contained in both the Conservative Party manifesto ahead of the 2015 general election as well as statements made in the July 2015 budget. Among other measures that Act represents the Government's attempts to increase employment, curb the welfare budget, reduce child poverty and support working households.

== Provisions ==
- Section 1 establishes a duty to produce an annual report on progress towards full employment.
- Section 2 establishes a duty to report on progress towards three million apprenticeships during this Parliament.
- Section 5 amends the Child Poverty Act 2010 so that the Secretary of State must produce an annual report on 'life chances'.
- Section 7 repeals much of the Child Poverty Act 2010.
- Section 8 amends the Welfare Reform Act 2012 so that the annual limit for benefits is "£23,000 or £15,410, for persons resident in Greater London [and] £20,000 or £13,400, for other persons."
- Section 11 freezes a number of social security benefits for four years.
- Section 18 replaces Support for Mortgage Interest with Loans for Mortgage Interest.
- Section 23 requires social housing providers to reduce rent levels by 1% each year for four years beginning from 2016/17.

== Criticism ==
Many people have criticised the bill, with some even going as far as to defining it as a "Pandora's box for Britain's poorest families". The cuts to tax credits have been criticised for unfairly affecting the working poor, and a clause in the bill allows the benefits cap of £20,000 (£23,000 in London) to be reduced further, without any further consultation with Parliament (apart from the passage of the act through parliament), thus making those from larger families even worse off. It also called for £12bn to be made in cuts.

Harriet Harman, then interim leader of the Labour Party, required Labour MPs to abstain from the vote for the bill as opposed to voting against it (a move which US-based magazine The Nation said "underline[d] Labour's moral and intellectual bankruptcy".) However, the Labour Party was in the process of choosing a new leader at the time, and one candidate associated with the party's left-wing, the eventual new leader Jeremy Corbyn, voted against the bill along with 48 of his Labour colleagues who also defied the Labour whip. Other parties in opposition to the bill were the Scottish National Party (who said that the Bill was "...an attack on civil society, it's an attack on our poorest and hard working families, and it's a regressive Bill that takes us back in time with cuts that will hit women and children the hardest"), the Liberal Democrats, the Democratic Unionist Party (Northern Ireland), Plaid Cymru and the Green Party of England and Wales.
