= Alan Milburn =

British politician (born 1958)

The Right Honourable Alan Milburn
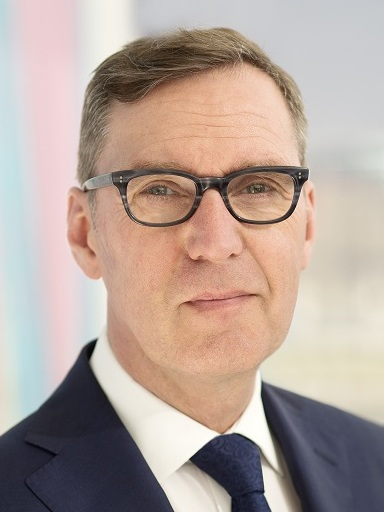
- Official portrait, 2016

Chancellor of Lancaster University
- Incumbent
- Assumed office 1 January 2015
- Preceded by: Chris Bonington

Chair of the Social Mobility Commission
- In office 10 July 2012 – 2 December 2017
- Appointed by: Nick Clegg
- Preceded by: Office established
- Succeeded by: Dame Martina Milburn

Minister for the Cabinet Office Chancellor of the Duchy of Lancaster
- In office 8 September 2004 – 6 May 2005
- Prime Minister: Tony Blair
- Preceded by: Douglas Alexander
- Succeeded by: John Hutton

Secretary of State for Health
- In office 11 October 1999 – 13 June 2003
- Prime Minister: Tony Blair
- Preceded by: Frank Dobson
- Succeeded by: John Reid

Chief Secretary to the Treasury
- In office 23 December 1998 – 11 October 1999
- Prime Minister: Tony Blair
- Chancellor: Gordon Brown
- Preceded by: Stephen Byers
- Succeeded by: Andrew Smith

Minister of State for Health Services
- In office 6 May 1997 – 23 December 1998
- Prime Minister: Tony Blair
- Preceded by: Gerry Malone
- Succeeded by: John Denham

Member of Parliament for Darlington
- In office 9 April 1992 – 12 April 2010
- Preceded by: Michael Fallon
- Succeeded by: Jenny Chapman

Personal details
- Born: 27 January 1958 (age 68) Whitehaven, Cumberland, England
- Party: Labour
- Education: Lancaster University

Alan Milburn (born 27 January 1958) is a British politician who was Member of Parliament (MP) for Darlington from 1992 to 2010. A member of the Labour Party, he served for five years in the Cabinet, first as Chief Secretary to the Treasury from 1998 to 1999, and subsequently as Secretary of State for Health until 2003, when he resigned. He briefly rejoined the Cabinet as Chancellor of the Duchy of Lancaster in order to manage Labour's 2005 re-election campaign. He did not seek re-election in the 2010 election. Milburn was chair of the Social Mobility Commission from 2012 to 2017. Since 2015, he has been Chancellor of Lancaster University.

== Early life and career ==
Milburn was born in Whitehaven, and brought up in the village of Tow Law in County Durham and in Newcastle-upon-Tyne.

He was educated at John Marley School in Newcastle and, after his mother married, Stokesley Comprehensive School in North Yorkshire. He went on to Lancaster University, where he lived in Morecambe and Galgate, graduating in 1979 with a Bachelor of Arts degree with Upper Second Class Honours in History. After leaving university, he returned to Newcastle where, with Martin Spence, he operated a small radical bookshop in the Westgate Road, called Days of Hope (the shop was given the Spoonerised nickname Haze of Dope). He studied for a PhD at Newcastle University, but did not complete his thesis.

Milburn was Co-ordinator of the Trade Union Studies Information Unit (TUSIU) from the mid-1980s onwards.

From 1988, Milburn co-ordinated a campaign to defend shipbuilding in Sunderland, Tyne and Wear, and was elected Chairman of Newcastle-upon-Tyne Central Constituency Labour Party. In 1990 he became a Business Development Officer for North Tyneside Borough Council and was elected as President of the North East Region of the Manufacturing Science and Finance trade union. He duly won the seat of Darlington in the 1992 general election.

== Member of Parliament ==
In Parliament, Milburn allied himself with the Blairite neoliberals in the Labour Party, close to Tony Blair, MP for the next-door constituency of Sedgefield. The political editor of the New Statesman wrote that "Alan Milburn is regarded by most in Labour as the epitome of Blairite centrism and moderation."

=== In government ===
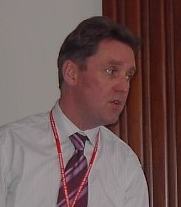
Milburn in 2002

In 1997 he was appointed Minister of State at the Department of Health, an important post in which he had responsibility for driving through Private Finance Initiative deals on hospitals. In the reshuffle caused by Peter Mandelson's resignation on 23 December 1998, Milburn was promoted to the Cabinet as Chief Secretary to the Treasury.

He became Secretary of State for Health in October 1999, with responsibility for continuing the reduction in waiting times and delivering modernisation in the National Health Service (NHS). In 2002 Milburn introduced NHS foundation trusts, originally envisaged as a new form of not-for-profit provider and "described at the time as a sort of halfway house between the public and private sectors". Milburn later described his reforms as "getting the private sector into the NHS to work alongside the public sector. We gave more choice to patients. We paid more for the hospitals that were doing more rather than paying everyone the same."

Milburn was thought to be a candidate for promotion within the Government, but on the day of a reshuffle (12 June 2003) he announced his resignation from government. He cited the difficulties of combining family life in North-East England with a demanding job in London as his reason for quitting. Later in 2003 stories appeared in the press of allegations, based on leaked emails, that Milburn had fiddled the 2002 NHS hospital ratings - including that of the hospital in the prime minister's constituency.

While on the backbenches he continued to be a strong supporter of Tony Blair's policies, especially his continued policy of increased private involvement in public service provision. Following his resignation as Secretary of State for Health, Milburn took a post for £30,000 a year as an adviser to Bridgepoint Capital, a venture capital firm heavily involved in financing private health-care firms moving into the NHS, including Alliance Medical, Match Group, Medica and the Robinia Care Group.

He returned to government in September 2004, as Chancellor of the Duchy of Lancaster. He was brought back to lead the Labour Party's campaign in the 2005 general election, but the unsuccessful start to the campaign led to Milburn taking a back seat, with Gordon Brown returning to take a very prominent role.

=== Backbenches ===
On election night in 2005, he announced he would be leaving the Cabinet for a second time, although rumours persisted that he would challenge Gordon Brown for the succession. On 27 June 2007, Brown was unopposed. On 8 September 2006, after Tony Blair had announced his intention to step down within a year, Charles Clarke suggested Milburn as leader in place of Brown. On 28 February 2007, he and Clarke launched The 2020 Vision, a website intended to promote policy debate in the Labour Party.

He was the honorary president of the political organisation Progress, which was founded by Derek Draper. In 2007, Milburn worked as an advisor to Australian Prime Minister Kevin Rudd and again in 2010 acted as an advisor to the election campaign of Julia Gillard. Between January and July 2009, Milburn chaired a governmental commission on social mobility, the Panel on Fair Access to the Professions. The Panel reported in July 2009 with recommendations to improve social mobility by acting at every life stage – including through schools, universities, internship practices and recruitment processes.

In 2007, Milburn became a paid advisor to PepsiCo and sat on its nutritional advisory board. By the time he stood down from Parliament, Milburn had an income at least £115,000 a year from five companies.

In June 2009, he told his local party he would not be standing at the 2010 general election, saying: "Standing down as an MP will give me the chance to balance my work and my family life with the time to pursue challenges other than politics."

== Later career ==
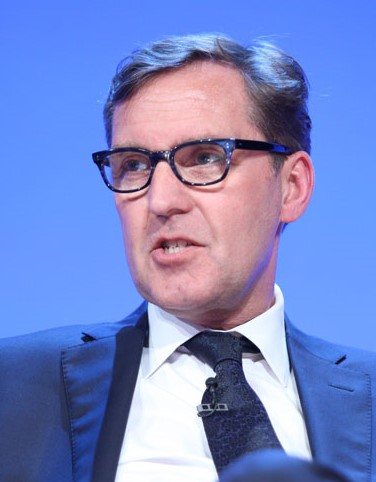
Milburn addressing the NHS Confederation Conference in 2014

Despite the change of government following the May 2010 general election, it was reported in August 2010 that Milburn had been offered a role in the Conservative-Liberal Democrat coalition as "social mobility tsar". Although not officially politically-affiliated, the role would involve advising the government on how to break down social barriers for people from disadvantaged backgrounds, and help people who feel they are barred from top jobs on grounds of race, religion, gender or disability. Milburn provoked criticism from former Cabinet colleague John Prescott, and his former ally Andy Burnham, for advising the government. However, David Miliband defended Milburn claiming that he was serving the country and was not working for the coalition government.

In June 2011, Milburn was asked by Andrew Lansley to chair the new clinical commissioning board, as part of the Coalition Government's health reforms but he rejected the offer labelling the reforms as "privatization", "cuts" and a "car crash".

In 2011, Milburn contributed to The Purple Book (alongside other key figures in the Labour Party such as Ed Miliband, Peter Mandelson, Jacqui Smith, Liam Byrne, Tessa Jowell, Tristram Hunt, Stephen Twigg, Rachel Reeves and Liz Kendall). In the book, he called for the Labour Party to adopt a policy of "educational credit", a system whereby lower and middle-income families whose children attend failing schools can withdraw their children and get funding, worth 150% the cost of education at the failing school, in order to pay for a place at a higher achieving school for the child, with the money coming from the budget of the failing school. The policy was rejected by the leftwing MP Michael Meacher but was welcomed by Labour's Shadow Education Secretary Stephen Twigg and other shadow cabinet members.

In 2012, a senior Number 10 adviser called for Andrew Lansley to be "taken out and shot" for introducing the Health and Social Care bill despite widespread opposition, and that Alan Milburn should be ennobled and join the coalition government as Secretary of State for Health. This was rejected by David Cameron and it is understood that Milburn rejected such offer and remained in the Labour Party. He wrote in The Times attacking the reforms, but calling for the left to give an alternative.

In July 2012, Milburn was appointed as Chair of the Social Mobility and Child Poverty Commission. He served until his resignation in December 2017.

In 2013 Milburn joined PricewaterhouseCoopers (PwC) as Chair of PwC's UK Health Industry Oversight Board, whose objective is to drive change in the health sector, and assist PwC in growing its presence in the health market. Milburn continued to be chairman of the European Advisory Board at Bridgepoint Capital, whose activities include financing private health care companies providing services into the NHS, and continued as a member of the Healthcare Advisory Panel at Lloyds Pharmacy. As of 2022 he remains a Senior Adviser to PwC.

In 2015, Milburn became Lancaster University’s third Chancellor, taking over from the mountaineer Chris Bonington.

Early in 2015, Milburn intervened in the British election campaign to criticise Labour's health plans, which would limit private sector involvement in the NHS. Milburn was criticised for doing so while having a personal financial interest in the private health sector. In 2017, Milburn was touted as a possible leader of a pro-EU movement after Brexit.

In November 2025, Milburn was asked by prime minister Keir Starmer to look at why one million 16 to 24-year-olds in the UK were not in education, employment or training. Milburn published an interim report on 28 May 2026, stating that "a rising tide of mental ill-health, anxiety, depression [and] neurodiversity" is a central driver of economic inactivity among young people. The government noted the number of NEETs in the UK was twice as high as Ireland, Japan, and other advanced economies. Milburn explained: "What is shameful is that we've discovered in the course of this review for every £25 that we spend keeping young people on benefits, we spend only a pound helping them get into work through employment support."

== Personal life ==
Milburn married future Labour MEP Mo O'Toole in 1981; the couple split up in the late 1980s.

Milburn has been in a relationship with Ruth Briel, a consultant psychiatrist, since 1990. They married in 2007. They have two sons.

== Honours ==
Country	Date	Appointment	Post-nominal letters
United Kingdom	1998–present	Member of His Majesty's Most Honourable Privy Council	PC

=== Scholastic ===
Chancellor, visitor, governor, rector and fellowships

Location	Date	School	Position
England	1 January 2015 –	University of Lancaster	Chancellor

Honorary Degrees

Location	Date	School	Degree	Gave Commencement Address
England	2000	University of Lancaster	Doctor of Laws (LL.D)	Yes
England	19 July 2012	University of Exeter	Doctor of Laws (LL.D)	Yes
England	23 January 2020	University of Sussex	Doctor of the University (D.Univ)	Yes

Parliament of the United Kingdom
Preceded by Michael Fallon	Member of Parliament for Darlington; 1992–2010	Succeeded by Jenny Chapman
Political offices
Preceded by Gerry Malone	Minister of State for Health Services; 1997–1998	Succeeded by John Denham
Preceded by Stephen Byers	Chief Secretary to the Treasury; 1998–1999	Succeeded by Andrew Smith
Preceded by Frank Dobson	Secretary of State for Health; 1999–2003	Succeeded by John Reid
Preceded by Douglas Alexander	Minister for the Cabinet Office; 2004–2005	Succeeded by John Hutton
Preceded by Douglas Alexander	Chancellor of the Duchy of Lancaster; 2004–2005	Succeeded by John Hutton
Academic offices
Preceded by Sir Chris Bonington	Chancellor of the University of Lancaster; 2015-Present	Incumbent
