= Melbourne Moran =

American politician

Member of New Hampshire House of Representatives for Hillsborough 34
- In office December 2, 2020 – December 7, 2022
- Preceded by: Greg Indruk

Personal details
- Party: Democratic
- Education: Boston University School of Social Work

Melbourne R. Moran Jr. is an American politician. He was a member of the New Hampshire House of Representatives and represented Hillsborough 34th district. In 2024, Moran was named the 2024 Social Worker of the Year by the National Association of Social Workers New Hampshire Chapter (NASW-NH). He is Alderman At-Large for the City of Nashua.
