= British Citizen Awards =

Ceremony held bi-annually in the United Kingdom

The British Citizen Award (BCA) is a recognition programme (The People's Honours) which is held bi-annually in the United Kingdom for individuals doing extraordinary work in their local community. The People's Honours was founded in September 2012. The medal presentation takes place in January and July each year at the Palace of Westminster hosted by The Rt. Hon. Lord Dholakia. In order to honour young people who are aged 18 and under who are also doing extraordinary work in their community, The British Citizen Youth Award was launched. The award ceremony for the BCyA also takes place at The Palace of Westminster annually in October each year.

== Patrons ==
- Mary Perkins
- Lord Dholakia
- Bradley Walsh

== Nominations ==
Individuals are nominated for The British Citizen Award provided that they have had a meaningful impact on their community. Nominees come from all across the UK, all cultural backgrounds, and from all sectors of the community.

Nominations are free and all successful applicants are invited to a presentation day at the Palace of Westminster in London. Those who receive a BCA will be encouraged to use the post nominal after their name, thus enabling them to promote their achievement in perpetuity.

Nominations will require validation, the first level of which is the seconding of all individual submissions. The BCA Independent Assessment Panel will then require evidence that the achievements, commitment and dedication outlined in the application form has brought benefit to any given community or group. Finally the panel will need to ratify the application before an award will be made. The robust process ensures that the award becomes meaningful, sought-after and long-lasting.

== Categories ==
Each award is made in its own category. There's currently 8 categories:

- BCAa - for Service to Arts
- BCAb - for Service to Business
- BCAc - for Service to the Community
- BCAe - for Service to Education
- BCAh - for Service to Healthcare
- BCAi - for Service to Industry
- BCAo - for International Achievement
- BCAv - for Volunteering & Charitable Giving

== BCA Honours ==
Roll of Honours July 2021:

- Martin Turner, BCAc
- Maggie Short, BCAe
- Ragasudha Rani Vinjamuri, BCAa
- Marion Baker, BCAh
- Nick Barnes, BCAe
- Robert James, BCAv
- Lianne Havell, BCA
- Marcelle Porteous, BCAv
- Xavier Wiggins, BCAc
- Craig Wellstead, BCAc
- Cormac Van Der Hoeven, BCAc
- Tony Lopes, BCAc
- David Rowles, BCAv
- Rachel Mason, BCAa
- Stuart Smith, BCAc
- Andrew Palazon, BCAc
- Richard Andersone, BCAv
- Joan Halkett, BCAe
- Pam Ashmore, BCAv
- Elaine Powell, BCAh
- Ross Hockham, BCAe
- Saira Begum Mir, BCAc
- Suzanne Smith, BCAv
- Janet Sayers, BCAv
- Idris Patel, BCAc
- Anwar Khattak, BCAc

Roll of Honours January 2021:

- Alan Bell BCAe
- Alexander Anderson BCAv
- Alia Jones BCAc
- Anthony Kelly BCAh
- Barrie de Suys BCAv
- Claire Furness BCAe
- Dennis Gowans BCAv
- Graham Dodds BCAc
- Preeti Kaur BCAv
- Helen Mackenzie BCAc
- Jonathan Hindley BCAv
- Joyce Porter BCAv
- Khalid Raza BCAo
- Louise Channon BCAv
- Mansoor Ahmad BCAv
- Michael Scott BCAc
- Mohammed Nadeem BCAc
- Mukesh Malhotra BCAv
- Paul Browning BCAh
- Rofikul Islam BCAc
- Sally Miller BCAc
- Sarah Gardner BCAv
- Sharon Warboys BCAc
- Sharon Knott BCAc
- Stephen Wyatt BCAc
- Timothy Baker BCAa
- Tracie Pal BCAc

Roll of Honours July 2020:

- Dr. Aamer Khan BCAh
- Alan Lewis BCAv
- Anne Boyd BCAb
- Arthur Gray BCAc
- Bee Bee Waldon BCAc
- Carla Andrews BCAh
- David Edward Pugh BCAc
- Derek Scrivener BCAc
- Doreen Raymond BCAc
- Jade Kilduff BCAc
- Janet Gurney BCAc
- Joseph Craven BCAc
- Kevin Winchcombe BCAv
- Linda Shave BCAc
- Mark Kissin BCAh
- Michael Cullen BCAv
- Nahimul Islam BCAv
- Nicola Sheldrake BCAe
- Olutayo Arikawe BCAh
- Oyovwe Kigho BCAh
- Peter Baker BCAc
- Dr. Shamus Butt BCAv
- Shirley Barrett BCAc
- Simona Stankovska BCAv
- Sophia Kaur Badhan BCAh
- Neil Jurd BCAv

Roll of Honours January 2020:

- Adedayo Olowsale, BCAc
- Ally Eloise, BCAv
- Barbara Williams, BCAc
- Ben Forbes, BCAc
- Bevan Johns, BCAv
- Carolyn Cross, BCAv
- Coral Kelham, BCAc
- David Facey, BCAv
- David Gentry, BCAe
- Dr Nooralhaq Nasimi, BCAc
- Jackie Cooper, BCAv
- Jamie McDonald, BCAv
- Jim Montgomerie, BCAv
- Jonathan Dalton, BCAc
- Kim Hughes, BCAv
- Laura Dunion, BCAv
- Leah Chowdhry, BCAv
- Lindsey Wilmshurst, BCAh
- Lorraine & Lee Lewis, BCAh
- Maureen Collins, BCAc
- Mervin Sharp, BCAv
- Michael Brown, BCAc
- Michael Douglass, BCAh
- Michelle Southern, BCAv
- Nic Williams, BCAc
- Paul England, BCAv
- Paul Townsend, BCAv
- Salma Bi, BCAe
- Scott Fitzsimmons, BCAv
- Steve Whiteway, BCAc
- Vinod Patel, BCAc

Roll of Honours July 2019:

- Sayd Ahmed, BCAhon
- Emma Rigby, BCAhon
- Paul Atwal-Brice, BCAc
- Tony Nisbet, BCAv
- Frank McGowan, BCAv
- Brett Townsley, BCAc
- Christine Reid, BCAv
- Carol Darby, BCAa
- Ron Darby, BCAa
- Dennis Jones, BCAc
- Nora Bryan, BCAe
- Suzanne Fernando, BCAh
- Shwetal Shah, BCAhon
- Dave McPartlin, BCAe
- Elaine McCarthy, BCAc
- Nahim Ahmed, BCAa
- Caroline Bestwick, BCAh
- Corinne Hutton, BCAc
- Dwain Longley, BCAh
- Siobhan Fennell, BCAc
- Sean Molino, BCAh
- Lauren Doherty, BCAv
- Adrian Ducker, BCAc
- Dr. Bill Webster, BCAh
- Alex Eades, BCAv
- Leigh Yates, BCAe
- Karen Schurer, BCAv
- Joan Briglin, BCAc
- Neil Parsons, BCAc
- Deborah Slator, BCAv
- Will Harris, BCAv
- Henderson Moore, BCAc
- Molly Bird, BCAv
- Margaret Woolhouse, BCAc
- Tony Foulds, BCAc

Roll of Honours January 2019:

- Andrew Willis, BCAv
- Valerie Gwynne, BCAv
- Cliff Van Tonder, BCAa
- David Wood, BCAv
- Bridget Biddlecombe, BCAc
- Paul Biddlecombe, BCAc
- Ian Wilson, BCAh
- Deborah Hedderwick, BCAa
- Stephen Howard, BCAc
- Kevin Byrne, BCAb
- Ahmad Nawaz, BCAhon
- Dr. Harjinder Kaur, BCAe
- Brian Jones, BCAe
- Ella Marsden, BCAv
- Peter Ryan, BCAc
- Daniel Lawrence, BCAc
- Marianne Cash, BCAc
- Julian Cash, BCAc
- Nazim Ali, BCAc
- Isobel Lafferty, BCAc
- Pamela Corrigan, BCAv
- Natasha Krywald, BCAv
- Robert McCarthy, BCAv
- Keith Davies, BCAv
- Prof. Roman Hovorka, BCAh
- Linda Kirk, BCAh
- Haroon Mahmood, BCAh
- Rhona Innes, BCAh
- Dr. Nihara Krause, BCAh
- Timothy Evers, BCAh

Roll of Honours July 2018:

- Terence Yates, BCAc
- Billy Birch, BCAv
- Jeanette Lowe, BCAc
- Benjamin Carpenter, BCAe
- Joyce Obaseki, BCAc
- Bruce Ferguson, BCAc
- Ronald Charles Mills, BCAe
- Naveen Arles, BCAa
- Reece Ryan, BCAv
- Caitlin Jones, BCAv
- Dr. Asher Lewinsohn, BCAh
- John Anderson, BCAc
- Sharron Hardwick, BCAo
- Jonathan David Dixon, BCAv
- Lily Blewitt, BCAc
- Lisa Oguntoyinbo, BCAv
- Les Newington, BCAv
- Judith Wood, BCAh
- Carlos Dennis, BCAv
- Chrisetta Mitchell, BCAv
- Lauraine Cheesman, BCAc
- Douglas Thomas, BCAc
- Hyung Dal Kim, BCAc
- Chris Ross, BCAv
- Marie O’Brien, BCAa
- Lynne Misner, BCAc
- Muhammad Ahmad, BCAc
- Yvonne Limbrick, BCAe
- Amanda Conner, BCAb

Roll of Honours January 2018:

- Dr. Abdullah Kraam, BCAh
- Ann-Marie Lyons-Mummery, BCAc
- Anthony Ebbutt, BCAv
- Chris Clark, BCAe
- David Evans, BCAo
- Dr. Peter Minto, BCAe
- David Wase, BCAv
- Dr. Diahanne Rhiney, BCAe
- Eric Green, BCAc
- Irene Hicks, BCAv
- Jane Gould-Smith, BCAi
- Jennifer Gill, BCAv
- Moawia Bin-Sufyan, BCAe
- John McGorman, BCAv
- John Newell, BCAv
- Joy Hudson, BCAc
- John Hudson, BCAc
- Kojo Marfo, BCAa
- LeighAnne Wright, BCAv
- Lynda Smith, BCAh
- Margaret McCrirrick, BCAv
- Mark Jones, BCAc
- Nick Antill-Holmes, BCAc
- Nigel Davidson, BCAv
- Joan Ward, BCAc
- Qaiser Niazi, BCAc
- Saba Nasim, BCAv
- Shani Shamah, BCAv
- Sheila Hanson, BCAc
- David Hanson, BCAc
- David Holby-Wolinski, BCAc
- Steven Walker, BCAv
- Sue Lockwood, BCAe
- Toby Freeman, BCAh
- Walter Innes, BCAc
- Wayne Knowles, BCAc

Roll of Honours July 2017:

- Dr. Donald Mackenzie, BCAc
- Chris Morrison, BCAo
- Kelly Waite, BCAc
- Jagraj Poselay, BCAc
- Ben Haggarty, BCAa
- Fiona Coldron, BCAc
- Daphne Sharp, BCAc
- Elaine Dunlop, BCAc
- Steven Makin, BCAe
- Susan Rutherford, BCAv
- Clive Daniels, BCAv
- Kelvin Smith, BCAv
- Dr. Farnaaz Sharief, BCAh
- Adrian Walker, BCAo
- Andrew Baker, BCAv
- Raymond Cannings, BCAv
- Fiona Southern, BCAc
- Steve Whitmore, BCAv
- Nishall Garala, BCAc
- Gillian Williamson, BCAv
- Michelle Mulholland, BCAv
- Alan Faulds, BCAc
- Scott Wilson, BCAc
- Doreen Duke, BCAc
- Andrew Clarke-Coates, BCAh
- Mary Beard, BCAc
- Sheila Foster, BCAc
- Anthony Paul Holding, BCAc
- Mary Taggart, BCAc
- David Campbell, BCAe
- Lorraine Sass, BCAe

Roll of Honours January 2017:

- Gwen Gray, BCAc
- Linda McLeod, BCAv
- Adam Black, BCAe
- Richard Chalmers, BCAc
- Les Heyhoe, BCAv
- Martha Lester-Cribb, BCAc
- Sandy Kerr, BCAc
- Denise Fergus, BCAc
- Ray Matthews, BCAc
- Julie Hill, BCAv
- Clive Horton-Stephens, BCAc
- Agnes Forde, BCAc
- Beryl Parker, BCAv
- John Holden, BCAa
- Pauline Holden, BCAa
- Janis Thomson, BCAc
- Marion Strudwick, BCAe
- Kevin Healey, BCAv
- Mohammed Saddique, BCAv
- Christine Higgott, BCAa
- Steve Mee, BCAc
- Dr. Joseph Waas, BCAh
- Janet Perce, BCAc
- Fred Holland, BCAh
- Bamidele Adeoye, BCAc
- Rita Piller, BCAv
- Shane Yerrell, BCAc
- Avis Fawcitt, BCAa

Roll of Honours July 2016:

- Max Morris, BCAv
- Jeanette Marshall, BCAc
- Kenny Marshall, BCAc
- Barbara Craig, BCAh
- Stanley Taylor, BCAc
- David Atkinson, BCAe
- Charles Hustwayte, BCAc
- Cintra Bainbridge, BCAv
- Audrey Tibbles, BCAv
- Mohammed Amran, BCAc
- Kim Douglas, BCAh
- Christine Connell, BCAc
- Doreen Mitchell, BCAc
- Amanda Root, BCAa
- Tim Low, BCAe
- Sharron Macdonald, BCAe
- Eileen Galling, BCAc
- Torron-Lee Dewar, BCAa
- Irene Calcutt, BCAh
- Richard Field, BCAc
- Michael Bates, BCAc
- Frances Kelly, BCAa
- Brian Linnegar, BCAv
- Jonathan Andrews, BCAb
- Nigel Blair-Park, BCAh
- Karen Thistlethwaite, BCAv
- Julie Bell, BCAc
- Zoe Clark-Coates, BCAh
- Rosemary Hutton, BCAa
- Simon Headley, BCAv
- Sajid Rashid, BCAc
- Courtney Hughes, BCAv
- Dr. Mark Sims, BCAv
- Ethan Evans, BCAy

Roll of Honours January 2016:

- Andrew Davies, BCAe
- Mayoor Patel, BCAo
- Mohammed Zafran, BCAc
- Charles Claydon, BCAh
- Anthony Gowing, BCAh
- Nancy Kilburn, BCAv
- Tony Eaton, BCAv
- Stella Hayes, BCAv
- Raymond Collins, BCAc
- Trevor Gilbert, BCAb
- Lawrence Lockhart, BCAe
- Josephine Wylie, BCAc
- Sylvia Morris, BCAh
- Joyce Foxall, BCAv
- Professor Gerald Russell, BCAh
- Julie Lankshear, BCAv & Sue Dennett, BCAv
- Harrison Nash, BCAo
- Sarah Hynds, BCAc
- Elspeth Baecke, BCAo
- James Ewins, BCAo
- Barbara Boyes, BCAc
- Elizabeth Jackson, BCAc
- Alan Nethercott, BCAv
- John Young, BCAc
- Ken Floyde, BCAc
- Paula Maguire, BCAv & Robert Maguire, BCAv
- Andy Jackson, BCAv
- Mavis Nye, BCAh
- Alison Kinge, BCAv
- Emily Palmer, BCAv
- Fred Sirieix, BCAc

Roll of Honours July 2015:

- Jane Newton, BCAc
- Heather Jones, BCAe
- Daniel O’Brien, BCAc
- Max Levitas, BCAc
- George Geraghty, BCAc
- Mark and Nicola Tipping, BCAv
- Gordon Badenoch, BCAv
- Elizabeth Parker, BCAo
- Kenneth Gardner, BCAa
- Joyce Rothschild, BCAv
- Kwong Ngan, BCAc
- Patsy Elliott, BCAv
- Christopher Colledge, BCAc
- Stuart Russell, BCAa
- David Hardy, BCAc
- Mary Rae, BCAa
- Brian and Mary Kay, BCAv
- Patricia Caffrey, BCAv
- Nicola Stevens, BCAo
- David Westley, BCAc
- Barbara Ruby Quartey, BCAe
- John Fahey, BCAv
- Ashley Jones, BCAc
- Graham Penness, BCAc
- Rosa Macpherson, BCAv
- Maureen Brass, BCAa
- Chantal Lockey, BCAh
- Martin Wyatt, BCAa
- Jodie Vasquez, BCAv
- Monica Russell, BCAv

Roll of Honours January 2015:

- Simon Albert, BCAb
- John Anderson, BCAv
- Susan Bates, BCAv
- Dr. Ashok Bhuvanagiri, BCAc
- Shane Board, BCAv
- Evelyn Buckland, BCAc
- Charles Callaghan, BCAv
- Donald Franks, BCAv
- Claire Guest, BCAh
- Lynda Gwyther, BCAe
- Pauline Holman, BCAv
- Audrey Johnson, BCAv
- Capt. Tristan Loraine, BCAi
- Tracy Maher, BCAc
- Harvey Mcsloy, BCAv
- Irene Moore, BCAc
- Primrose Kaur Panglea, BCAc
- Arun Vaghjibhai Patel, BCAh
- Linda Ann Phillips, BCAc
- Howell Briscoe Rowlands, BCAc
- Dorothy Rundle, BCAo
- Darran Saunders, BCAc
- Courtney Saunders-Jones, BCAc
- Caroline Shearer, BCAc
- John Shufflebottom, BCAv
- Tommy Whitelaw, BCAh
- Rick Wilson, BCAh
- Dr. Ann-Marie Wilson, BCAo

== BCyA Honours ==
Roll of Honours October 2022

- Aimee Phillips BCyA
- Alex Macpherson BCyA
- Aneeshwar Kunchala BCyA
- Dilip Gosall BCyA
- Ellis Whitehead BCyA
- Freddie Xavi BCyA
- Hughie Higginson BCyA
- Hannah Miah BCyA
- Heather Bryson BCyA
- Hollie Evans BCyA
- Poppie Evans BCyA
- Lillie Evans BCyA
- Jenk Oz BCyA
- Jessica Nelly Dowle BCyA
- Jax Batty BCyA
- Max Johnson BCyA
- Melissa Grace McComas BCyA
- Moksha Roy BCyA
- Poppy-mae Jones BCyA
- Reece Ryan BCyA
- Emilie Ryan BCyA
- Steven Rushmer BCyA
- Thomas Brinsley BCyA
- Zia Snow BCyA

Roll of Honours October 2021

- Maya Chiva Shah, BCyA
- Jack Hopkins, BCyA
- Samuel Gascoyne, BCyA
- Tony Hudgell, BCyA
- Milana Berhe, BCyA
- Amol Neupane, BCyA
- Millie Tammaro, BCyA
- Samir Mazumder, BCyA
- Lamissah La-Shontae Bhatti, BCyA
- Freya Thakral, BCyA
- Milan Paul Kumar, BCyA
- Carlos-Ricardo Luis Foster-Gomes, BCyA
- William Sears, BCyA
- Isabella Evans, BCyA
- Roxana-Andreea Tuinea-Bobe, BCyA
- Molly May, BCyA
- Jago Wickett, BCyA
- Millie Gould, BCyA
- George Ralphs, BCyA
- Taylor Ashe, BCyA
- Gethyn Dixon, BCyA
- Olivia Eaton, BCyA
- Beth Stephenson, BCyA

Roll of Honours October 2020:

- Monty Lord, BCyA
- Joshua Forster, BCyA
- Joseph Thompson, BCyA
- Henry Howarth, BCyA
- Katie Bradbeer, BCyA
- Chloe Rollitt, BCyA
- Michael Prentice, BCyA
- Hollie-Grace Gough, BCyA
- Ava Prisk, BCyA
- Jack Yates, BCyA
- Lily Yates, BCyA
- Ruby Lockey-Pope, BCyA
- Daniel Lloyd, BCyA
- Krish Zagorski-Shah, BCyA
- Rohan Zagorski-Shah, BCyA
- Anokhi Zagorski-Shah, BCyA
- Lauren Lazard, BCyA
- Faith Clotworthy, BCyA
- Joseph Bartlett, BCyA
- Kane Roker, BCyA
- Charlotte Berry, BCyA
- Sahil Usman, BCyA
- Ciaren Adam, BCyA
- Christopher Johnson, BCyA
- Francis Cantlow, BCyA

Roll of Honours October 2019:

- Aidan Henderson, BCyA
- Amy Barbour, BCyA
- Andrew Lunn BCyA
- James Lunn, BCyA
- Marcus Weston, BCyA
- Chloe Blanchfeld, BCyA
- Evie Toombes, BCyA
- Ben Godsell, BCyA
- Ellie Toth, BCyA
- Freddie Clark, BCyA
- Sam McGhee, BCyA
- Daniel Bubb, BCyA
- Matthew Bubb, BCyA
- Charlie Matthews, BCyA
- Georgina Bearder, BCyA
- Benjamin Harbottle, BCyA
- Amy Roberts, BCyA
- Nicole Kessy, BCyA
- Harry Steel, BCyA
- Olivia Hancock, BCyA
- Isaac Mendelsohn, BCyA
- Joey Tildesley-Devine, BCyA
- Nathan Halford, BCyA
- Jack Thompson, BCyA
- Marcus Wilton, BCyA
- Sir John Heron School, HON

Roll of Honours October 2018:

- Alex Yates, BCyA
- Olivia Hart, BCyA
- Nicholas Nikiforou, BCyA
- Tallulah Deeks, BCyA
- Jake Cathcart, BCyA
- Nicole Kalungwishi-Hines, BCyA
- Courtney Powdrill, BCyA
- Tyler Ford, BCyA
- Kiaragh Brown, BCyA
- Jake Glennon, BCyA
- Millie Nabarro, BCyA
- Ben Mooney, BCyA
- Bethany Groves, BCyA
- Georgie Cavanagh, BCyA
- Ishwar Sharma, BCyA
- Hannah Chowdhry, BCyA
- Jonathon Dawes, BCyA
- Katlyn Wilson, BCyA
- Jordan Havell, BCyA
- Ruben Evans-Guillen, BCyA
- Elena Evans-Guillen, BCyA
- Iggy Just, BCyA
- Siena Castallon, BCyA

Roll of Honours October 2017:

- Mia Goleniowska, BCyA
- Natalie Goleniowska, BCyA
- Junior Frood, BCyA
- Bethan Owen, BCyA
- Benjamin Wilson-Mayor, BCyA
- Aidan Jackson, BCyA
- Emily Lindley, BCyA
- Jake Mendelsohn, BCyA
- Chanel Murrish, BCyA
- Owen Perks, BCyA
- Molly Fraser, BCyA
- Caine Wildman, BCyA
- Aled Griffiths, BCyA
- Grace Warnock, BCyA
- Ted McCaffery, BCyA
- Bailey Matthews, BCyA
- Phoebe Maddison, BCyA
- Gracie Howarth, BCyA
- Madeleine Barnsley, BCyA
- Cody McManus, BCyA
- Amelia Butterfield, BCyA
- Ellie Payne, BCyA
- Jenny Cook, BCyA
- Erin Spray, BCyA

Roll of Honours October 2016:

- Jonjo Heuerman, BCyA
- Louis Johnson, BCyA
- Luke Chapman, BCyA
- Bethan Rees, BCyA
- Honey Jones, BCyA
- Jennifer Brown, BCyA
- Elly Neville, BCyA
- Oliver Gatenby, BCyA
- Esme Clark-Coates, BCyA
- Bronte Clark-Coates, BCyA
- Keira Beeson, BCyA
- Sophie Fraser, BCyA
- Ryan Wiggins, BCyA
- Ashley Palipana, BCyA
- Lyndsey Engelbrecht, BCyA
- Millie Turner, BCyA
- A’Mari Carribon, BCyA
- Joab Price, BCyA
- Emma whittaker, BCyA
- James Whittaker, BCyA
