= Jackie Milburn (footballer, born 1921) =

English footballer (1921–2006)

Personal information
- Full name: John Nicholson Milburn
- Date of birth: 15 September 1921
- Place of birth: Crook, England
- Date of death: 18 June 2006 (aged 84)
- Place of death: Stanhope, England
- Position: Left winger

Senior career*
Years	Team	Apps	(Gls)
- Crook Town
- Willington
- Stanley United
1939–1945	Newcastle United	0	(0)
- * Club domestic league appearances and goals

John Nicholson Milburn (15 September 1921 – 18 June 2006) was an English footballer.

== Early life ==
Born in Crook, County Durham; Milburn was interested in all sports and became well known for his running and football skills. His running career was at a time of big bets, weighted body belts and lead in the pumps - all to bamboozle the bookies. At the time the Shildon Show was a huge event for runners.

As a school child he played football for Crook District (10-14's) and the team always did well in competitions, travelling to many distant locations. The team was drawn from seven schools in the area and on a number of occasions reached the semi-finals. In one semi-final they played Manchester who had children selected from 300 schools, first they played at Manchester and drew, played at Crook and drew, then tossed a coin to see where the next match would be. It took place in Manchester and Crook lost 1–0. This schoolboy team drew larger crowds than Crook United, having local attendances in excess of 5–6000.

== Career ==
He played for Crook Town, Willington and Stanley United before the war and Newcastle United during the Second World War as left winger. Milburn's time at Newcastle lasted all the way through World War II and the majority of his appearances for The Magpies were in the Northern Combination League team and played one first team match for Newcastle, against Grimsby Town in December 1940. He was not related to "Wor Jackie" Milburn.

During World War II he played for the R.A.F. (as guest player for Chelsea in the same side as Sammy Weaver – who invented the long throw in). One program from his time at Chelsea, offers advice on what to do in the event of an air raid warning. "Those who wish to leave can do so. Play will continue unless the 'Spotter' reports enemy activity in the vicinity". He was sent to Cairo for three weeks whilst waiting to be transferred elsewhere however the man in charge of the camp discovered his talent and he remained there for two years. When stationed in Cairo he was the only non-international on the team (they never lost a match).

== Retirement ==
Milburn developed prostate cancer in his 80s and this was the direct cause of his death on 18 May 2006, only seven weeks after the death of his wife.

== Sources ==
- Rollin, Glenda; Rollin, Jack (2006). "Obituaries". SKY SPORTS FOOTBALL YEARBOOK 2006-2007 (37th ed.). Headline Publishing Group. p. 1028. ISBN 0-7553-1526-X.
- "The first Jackie Milburn - Crook's wartime Magpie".
- Backtrack's 2006 from The Northern Echo
