= Milburn Creek =

Stream in West Virginia, U.S.

Coordinates: 37°59′21″N 81°18′23″W

Milburn Creek is a stream in the U.S. state of West Virginia.

Milburn Creek was named after one Mr. Milburn, a pioneer settler.

== See also ==
- List of rivers of West Virginia
