= Milburn (given name) =

Milburn is an English male given name which may refer to:

== People ==
- Milburn Akers (1900–1970), American newspaper journalist and editor
- Milburn G. Apt (1924–1956), United States Air Force test pilot, the first person to reach the speed of Mach 3
- Tiny Croft (1920–1977), American National Football League player
- Milburn Morante (1887–1964), American actor, film director and makeup artist
- Milburn Price (born 1938), American hymn composer and academic
- Milt Shoffner, real name Milburn (1905–1978), American Major League Baseball pitcher
- Milburn Smith (1912–1994), American college and high school football and basketball coach
- Milburn Stone (1904–1980), American actor best known for playing Doc in the TV series Gunsmoke
- Milburn White (1878–1944), American politician

== Fictional characters ==
- Milburn Drysdale, a banker in the TV series The Beverly Hillbillies
- Milburn Pennybags, mascot of the game Monopoly

== See also ==
- Milburn
