= 2022–2023 mpox outbreak in Brazil =

Ongoing outbreak of mpox in Brazil

- Confirmed cases by state
- Disease: Mpox
- Pathogen: Monkeypox virus (West African clade)
- Location: Brazil
- Index case: São Paulo, Brazil
- Date: 20 May 2022 – 2023
- Confirmed cases: 5,525 (as of 10 September 2022)
- Suspected cases: 6
- Deaths: 2

The 2022–2023 mpox outbreak in Brazil is a part of the ongoing outbreak of human mpox caused by the West African clade of the monkeypox virus. The outbreak was first reported in Brazil on 9 June 2022 when a man in São Paulo was registered as the country's index case.

== Background ==
Mpox (/ˈɛmpɒks/, EM-poks; originally known as monkeypox) is an infectious viral disease that can occur in humans and other animals. Symptoms include a rash that forms blisters and then crusts over, as well as fever and swollen lymph nodes. The illness is usually mild, and most infected individuals recover within a few weeks without treatment. The time from exposure to the onset of symptoms ranges from three to seventeen days, and symptoms typically last from two to four weeks. However, cases may be severe, especially in children, pregnant women, or people with suppressed immune systems.

The disease is caused by the monkeypox virus, a zoonotic virus in the genus Orthopoxvirus. The variola virus, which causes smallpox, is also in this genus. Human-to-human transmission can occur through direct contact with infected skin or body fluids, including sexual contact. People remain infectious from the onset of symptoms until all the lesions have scabbed and healed. The virus may spread from infected animals through handling infected meat or via bites or scratches. Diagnosis can be confirmed by polymerase chain reaction (PCR) testing a lesion for the virus's DNA.

Vaccination is recommended for those at high risk of infection. No vaccine has been developed specifically against mpox, but smallpox vaccines have been found to be effective. There is no specific treatment for the disease, so the aim of treatment is to manage the symptoms and prevent complications. Antiviral drugs such as tecovirimat can be used to treat mpox, although their effectiveness has not been proven.

In May 2022, the World Health Organization (WHO) made an emergency announcement of the existence of a multi-country outbreak of mpox, a viral disease then commonly known as "monkeypox". The initial cluster of cases was found in the United Kingdom, where the first case was detected in London on 6 May 2022 in a patient with a recent travel history from Nigeria where the disease has been endemic. On 16 May, the UK Health Security Agency (UKHSA) confirmed four new cases with no link to travel to a country where mpox is endemic. Subsequently, cases have been reported from many countries and regions. The outbreak marked the first time mpox had spread widely outside Central and West Africa. The disease had been circulating and evolving in human hosts over several years before the outbreak and was caused by the clade IIb variant of the virus.

On 23 July 2022, the director-general of the WHO, Tedros Adhanom Ghebreyesus, declared the outbreak a public health emergency of international concern (PHEIC), stating that "we have an outbreak that has spread around the world rapidly, through new modes of transmission, about which we understand too little". A global response to the outbreak included public awareness campaigns in order to reduce spread of the disease, and repurposing of smallpox vaccines.

== Transmission ==
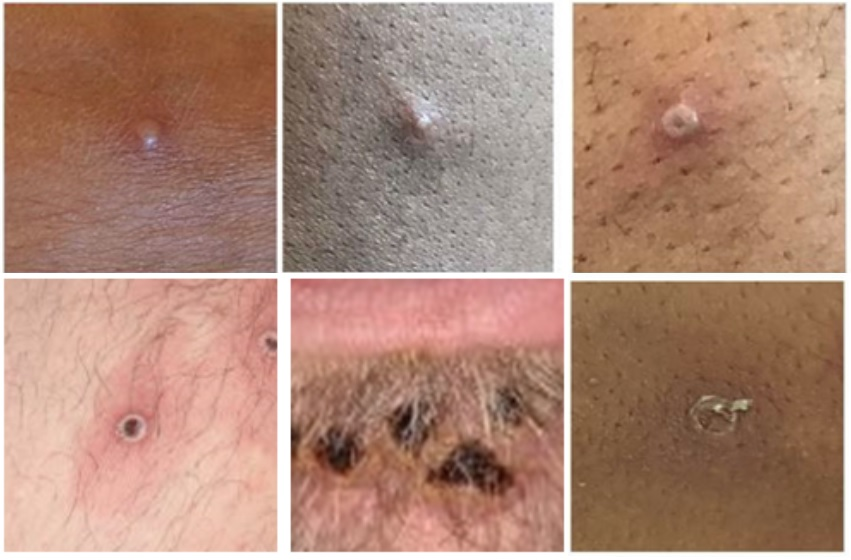
Stages of lesion development.

A large portion of those infected were believed to have not recently traveled to areas of Africa where mpox is normally found, such as Nigeria, the Democratic Republic of the Congo as well as central and western Africa. It is believed to be transmitted by close contact with sick people, with extra caution for those individuals with lesions on their skin or genitals, along with their bedding and clothing. The CDC has also stated that individuals should avoid contact and consumption of dead animals such as rats, squirrels, monkeys and apes along with wild game or lotions derived from animals in Africa.

In addition to more common symptoms, such as fever, headache, swollen lymph nodes, and rashes or lesions, some patients have also experienced proctitis, an inflammation of the rectum lining. CDC has also warned clinicians to not rule out mpox in patients with sexually transmitted infections since there have been reports of co-infections with syphilis, gonorrhea, chlamydia, and herpes.

== Timeline ==
Three suspected mpox cases were reported in Brazil on 30 May 2022. On 9 June, a 41-year-old man, who had recently travelled to Spain and Portugal and had been admitted to a São Paulo hospital, tested positive for the virus.

On 29 July, the first death was reported outside of Endemic african countries and the country's first mpox cases in children were confirmed in three kids from São Paulo city.

== See also ==
- 2022–2023 mpox outbreak
- Timeline of the 2022–2023 mpox outbreak
- 2022–2023 mpox outbreak in Asia
  - 2022–2023 mpox outbreak in India
- 2022–2023 mpox outbreak in Europe
  - 2022–2023 mpox outbreak in France
  - 2022–2023 mpox outbreak in Germany
  - 2022–2023 mpox outbreak in the Netherlands
  - 2022–2023 mpox outbreak in Portugal
  - 2022–2023 mpox outbreak in Spain
  - 2022–2023 mpox outbreak in the United Kingdom
- 2022–2023 mpox outbreak in Canada
- 2022–2023 mpox outbreak in Peru
- 2022–2023 mpox outbreak in South Africa
- 2022–2023 mpox outbreak in the United States
- Mpox in Nigeria
- Mpox in the Democratic Republic of the Congo
