= 2022–2023 mpox outbreak in Belgium =

Ongoing viral outbreak

- Disease: Mpox
- Pathogen: Monkeypox virus (West African clade)
- Location: Belgium
- Index case: Antwerp, Belgium
- Arrival date: 19 May 2022 (3 years, 11 months, 4 weeks and 1 day ago)
- Date: 15 March 2023
- Confirmed cases: 793
- Suspected cases^{‡}: 1
- Deaths: 2

The 2022–2023 mpox outbreak in Belgium is part of the larger outbreak of human mpox caused by the West African clade of the monkeypox virus. Belgium was the fifth country, outside of the African countries with endemic mpox, to experience an outbreak in 2022. The first case was documented in Antwerp, Belgium, on 19 May 2022. As of 10 August, Belgium has 546 cases and 1 suspected case.

== Background ==
Mpox (/ˈɛmpɒks/, EM-poks; originally known as monkeypox) is an infectious viral disease that can occur in humans and other animals. Symptoms include a rash that forms blisters and then crusts over, as well as fever and swollen lymph nodes. The illness is usually mild, and most infected individuals recover within a few weeks without treatment. The time from exposure to the onset of symptoms ranges from three to seventeen days, and symptoms typically last from two to four weeks. However, cases may be severe, especially in children, pregnant women, or people with suppressed immune systems.

The disease is caused by the monkeypox virus, a zoonotic virus in the genus Orthopoxvirus. The variola virus, which causes smallpox, is also in this genus. Human-to-human transmission can occur through direct contact with infected skin or body fluids, including sexual contact. People remain infectious from the onset of symptoms until all the lesions have scabbed and healed. The virus may spread from infected animals through handling infected meat or via bites or scratches. Diagnosis can be confirmed by polymerase chain reaction (PCR) testing a lesion for the virus's DNA.

Vaccination is recommended for those at high risk of infection. No vaccine has been developed specifically against mpox, but smallpox vaccines have been found to be effective. There is no specific treatment for the disease, so the aim of treatment is to manage the symptoms and prevent complications. Antiviral drugs such as tecovirimat can be used to treat mpox, although their effectiveness has not been proven.

An ongoing outbreak of mpox was confirmed on 6 May 2022, beginning with a British resident who, after travelling to Nigeria (where the disease is endemic), presented symptoms consistent with mpox on 29 April 2022. The resident returned to the United Kingdom on 4 May, creating the country's index case of the outbreak. The origin of several of the cases of mpox in the United Kingdom is unknown. Some monitors saw community transmission taking place in the London area as of mid-May, but it has been suggested that cases were already spreading in Europe in the previous months.

== Transmission ==
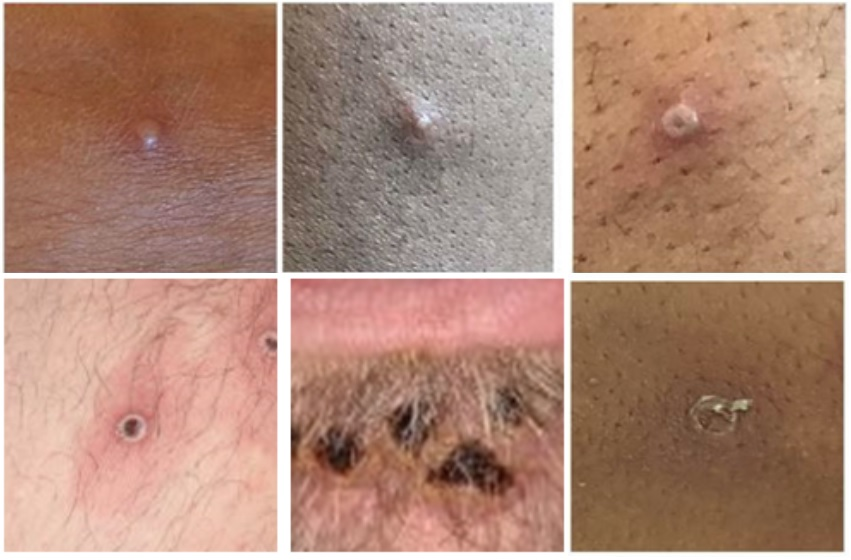
Stages of lesion development.

A large portion of those infected were believed to have not recently traveled to areas of Africa where mpox is normally found, such as Nigeria, the Democratic Republic of the Congo as well as central and western Africa. It is believed to be transmitted by close contact with sick people, with extra caution for those individuals with lesions on their skin or genitals, along with their bedding and clothing. The CDC has also stated that individuals should avoid contact and consumption of dead animals such as rats, squirrels, monkeys and apes along with wild game or lotions derived from animals in Africa.

In addition to more common symptoms, such as fever, headache, swollen lymph nodes, and rashes or lesions, some patients have also experienced proctitis, an inflammation of the rectum lining. CDC has also warned clinicians to not rule out mpox in patients with sexually transmitted infections since there have been reports of co-infections with syphilis, gonorrhea, chlamydia, and herpes.

== History ==
The first two known cases were detected in on 19 May 2022. The first infected person was diagnosed in Antwerp, and the second from a region called Flemish Brabant. Both had gone to the same party, and thus began the mpox outbreak in Belgium. It is unknown what hospital they went to, although it is very likely that the first infected person went to an Antwerp hospital, and the second infected person went to a Flemish Brabant region hospital. There, they both tested positive for mpox, becoming the first cases in Belgium.

A day after both tested positive, there was another case reported in a man of unknown age who was relatively healthy but had bullous lesions on his hands. More and more cases were reported in Belgium days later and more continue to be reported. As of 10 August, there are 546 cases and 1 suspected case.

== Vaccination response ==
On 5 July the Office of European Commissioner for Health, Stella Kyriakides, told Belga News Agency that 3,040 mpox vaccines were shipped to Belgium on 7 July. According to the Cypriot commissioner, these deliveries will "protect Belgian citizens and respond to this outbreak." She also praised the European Health Emergency Response and Preparedness Authority's (HERA) quick response. Kyriakides concluded that more doses will be delivered to Belgium in the following weeks.

== Responses and reactions ==
Hospitals have also begun making their own preparations to help control the current mpox outbreak, including screening patients, increasing decontamination and cleaning procedures, and wearing appropriate safety gear (Personal protective equipment / Medical gown) when interacting with infected patients.

Belgium also introduced a mandatory 21-day quarantine for infected mpox patients in hopes of containing the disease in the country. Close contacts are not required to self-isolate but are encouraged to remain vigilant, especially if in contact with vulnerable people.

== See also ==
- 2022–2023 mpox outbreak
- 2022–2023 mpox outbreak in Europe
  - 2022–2023 mpox outbreak in France
  - 2022–2023 mpox outbreak in Germany
  - 2022–2023 mpox outbreak in Italy
  - 2022–2023 mpox outbreak in the Netherlands
  - 2022–2023 mpox outbreak in Portugal
  - 2022–2023 mpox outbreak in Spain
  - 2022–2023 mpox outbreak in Switzerland
  - 2022–2023 mpox outbreak in the United Kingdom
- Monkeypox virus
- Timeline of the 2022–2023 mpox outbreak
- Smallpox vaccine
