= 2022–2023 mpox outbreak =

World public health emergency (May 2022 – May 2023)

- Spread of disease as of 14 October 2022 Endemic clade I (formerly Congo Basin or Central African clade) Endemic clade II (formerly West African clade) Both clades recorded Clade II outbreak in 2022 Suspected cases
- Disease: Mpox
- Pathogen: Monkeypox virus (MPV), clade II, 2017–2019 outbreak subclade
- Source: Travel from Nigeria (presumed/hypothesis)
- Location: 121 countries and territories (119 with confirmed cases, 2 with suspected cases only)
- First outbreak: London, United Kingdom (first outside of historically endemic African countries)
- Date: First international outbreak: 6 May 2022; Public health emergency of international concern: 23 July 2022 – 11 May 2023 (9 months, 2 weeks and 4 days)
- Confirmed cases: 99,518 (since January 2022) (6 August 2024)
- Deaths: 207 (since January 2022) (6 August 2024)

In May 2022, the World Health Organization (WHO) made an emergency announcement of the existence of a multi-country outbreak of mpox, a viral disease then commonly known as "monkeypox". The initial cluster of cases was found in the United Kingdom, where the first case was detected in London on 6 May 2022 in a patient with a recent travel history from Nigeria where the disease has been endemic. On 16 May, the UK Health Security Agency (UKHSA) confirmed four new cases with no link to travel to a country where mpox is endemic. Subsequently, cases have been reported from many countries and regions. The outbreak marked the first time mpox had spread widely outside Central and West Africa. The disease had been circulating and evolving in human hosts over several years before the outbreak and was caused by the clade IIb variant of the virus.

On 23 July 2022, the director-general of the WHO, Tedros Adhanom Ghebreyesus, declared the outbreak a public health emergency of international concern (PHEIC), stating that "we have an outbreak that has spread around the world rapidly, through new modes of transmission, about which we understand too little". A global response to the outbreak included public awareness campaigns in order to reduce spread of the disease, and repurposing of smallpox vaccines.

In May 2023, the World Health Organization declared an end to the PHEIC, citing steady progress in controlling the spread of the disease. Relatively low levels of cases continued to occur, and as of 30 April 2026, there have been a total of 180,545 confirmed cases and 506 deaths in 144 countries.

Mpox is a viral infection that manifests a week or two after exposure with fever and other non-specific symptoms, and then produces a rash with lesions that usually last for 2–4 weeks before drying up, crusting and falling off. While mpox can cause large numbers of lesions, in this outbreak some patients experience only a single lesion in the mouth or on the genitals, making it more difficult to differentiate from other infections. In previous outbreaks, 1–3 per cent of people with known infections had died (without treatment). In the 2022–2023 outbreak the rate of death was less than 0.2 percent. Cases in children and immunocompromised people are more likely to be severe.

Mpox spreads through close, personal, often skin-to-skin contact. The disease can spread through direct contact with rashes, or body fluids from an infected person, by touching objects and fabrics that have been used by someone with mpox or through respiratory secretions. Given the unexpected and vast geographical spread of the disease, the actual number of cases is likely to be underestimated. While anyone can get mpox, the majority of confirmed cases outside of the endemic regions in Africa occurred in young or middle-aged men who have sex with men (MSM) who had recent sexual contact with new or multiple partners. On 28 July 2022, the WHO Director-General advised MSM to limit exposure by reducing the number of sexual partners, reconsidering sex with new partners, and maintaining contact details to allow for epidemiological follow-up. The Centers for Disease Control and Prevention has emphasized the importance of reducing stigma in communicating about the demographic aspects of mpox, specifically with regards to gay and bisexual men.

A new outbreak of a different variant of mpox began in 2023 and was declared a PHEIC in August 2024.

== Background ==
Mpox, originally known as monkeypox, is an infectious viral disease that can occur in humans and other animals. Symptoms include a rash that forms blisters and then crusts over, as well as fever and swollen lymph nodes. The illness is usually mild, and most infected individuals recover within a few weeks without treatment. The time from exposure to the onset of symptoms ranges from three to seventeen days, and symptoms typically last from two to four weeks. However, cases may be severe, especially in children, pregnant women, or people with suppressed immune systems.

The disease is caused by the monkeypox virus, a zoonotic virus in the genus Orthopoxvirus. The variola virus, which causes smallpox, is also in this genus. Human-to-human transmission can occur through direct contact with infected skin or body fluids, including sexual contact. People remain infectious from the onset of symptoms until all the lesions have scabbed and healed. The virus may spread from infected animals through handling infected meat or via bites or scratches. Diagnosis can be confirmed by polymerase chain reaction (PCR) testing a lesion for the virus's DNA.

Vaccination is recommended for those at high risk of infection. No vaccine has been developed specifically against mpox, but smallpox vaccines have been found to be effective. There is no specific treatment for the disease, so the aim of treatment is to manage the symptoms and prevent complications. Antiviral drugs such as tecovirimat can be used to treat mpox, although their effectiveness has not been proven.

=== Emergency preparedness prior to outbreak ===
On 17 March 2021, the Nuclear Threat Initiative led a tabletop exercise at the Munich Security Conference simulating hypothetical public health responses to the intentional release of a genetically manipulated strain of monkeypox virus. On 23 July 2022, the World Health Organization Director-General Tedros Adhanom Ghebreyesus declared the 2022 outbreak a public health emergency of international concern. In May 2023, the emergency was declared over.

=== Endemic mpox in Africa ===
Mpox is endemic to West and Central Africa.

In a 2021 article, Oyewale Tomori pointed out that the number of mpox infections in Nigeria through 2021 were likely to be under-reported, because many Nigerians had been avoiding healthcare facilities due to fear of contracting COVID-19. Nigeria's surveillance of various diseases, including mpox, had to focus on the global COVID-19 pandemic in 2020 and 2021, missing many cases and resulting in a drop in official statistics.

As British health authorities reported the first case of mpox in the UK in May 2022, the Nigerian government released information and statistics on reported cases and deaths in the country: The report of 9 May 2022 stated that between 2017 and 2022 there were 230 confirmed cases across 20 states and the Federal Capital Territory. Rivers State was the most affected, followed by Bayelsa and Lagos. In the span from 2017 to 2022, the NCDC reported six deaths in six different states, making for a 3.3% case fatality ratio. On 30 May, the first death from mpox was reported in Nigeria during 2022; the last time a death was reported in the country from this disease was in 2019.

In May 2022 the Africa Centres for Disease Control and Prevention alerted several members of the African Union about cases of mpox. The director of the Africa CDC, Ahmed Ogwell, said that Cameroon, Central African Republic, the Democratic Republic of Congo and Nigeria have reported 1,405 endemic cases with 62 deaths during the first five months of 2022. The case fatality rate in these four African countries combined was 4.4%.

== Outbreak characteristics ==
Prior to the 2022 outbreak, the United Kingdom had recorded only seven previous cases of mpox, all of which were imported cases from Africa or healthcare workers involved in their treatment. The first three such cases were in 2018, followed by a further case in 2019 and three more in 2021. The only major mpox outbreak to be recorded in a Western country prior to 2022 was the 2003 Midwest monkeypox outbreak in the United States, which did not feature community transmission.

=== Phylogenetics ===
Phylogenomic characterization of the first monkeypox virus outbreak genome sequences, found the "presumably slow-evolving" DNA virus has evolved roughly 6–to-12-fold more mutations than one would expect and 15 SNP mutations since the beginning of the outbreak. Examination of the mutations suggested they were the result of cytosine deamination by an APOBEC (apolipoprotein B mRNA editing enzyme, catalytic polypeptide) protein expressed in the human cells. Recombination has been reported in the natural transmission of monkeypox virus. Using Tandem repeat polymorphism, case FVGITA-01 (ON755039) in Italy, case VIDRL01(ON631963) in Australia, as well as six cases in Slovenia (ON838178, ON631241, ON609725, ON754985, ON754986, ON754987) were recombinant crossovers. Based on linkage disequilibrium (LD) between monkeypox virus variants with minor alleles in at least two MPXV isolates and to detect the possible recombination, two Germany cases (ON959149 and ON637939) and one Spain case (ON720849) already gained their mutations via recombination. Scientists investigated circulating lineages (and potential variants) of the monkeypox virus and are comparing them against the African endemic lineages.

=== Long incubation periods ===
Most mpox patients become symptomatic 4–11 days after infection. Very short incubation periods are also possible, with 5% of patients developing symptoms within 3 days. This outbreak revealed that incubation periods of up to 4 weeks are possible, with 5% of cases having incubation periods longer than the previously assumed 21 days.

=== Mild clinical manifestations ===
An analysis of studies by a journalist in August 2022 indicated that "about 10 to 15% of cases had been hospitalized, mostly for pain and bacterial infections that can occur as a result of mpox lesions". Studies published a month later, in August indicated hospitalizations of small cohorts of early patients were 8% and 13%. A short review suggested supportive care may typically be sufficient and that several antivirals and vaccinia immune globulin intravenous (VIGIV) are available as treatments. The outbreak showed there can be (rare) asymptomatic infections.

=== Fear of zoonotic spread ===
In May 2022, the UK Human Animal Infections and Risk Surveillance (HAIRS) group warned that the virus could reach wildlife and become endemic as a result. There was a concern that if the ongoing outbreak is prolonged, it "could establish new ecological niches in wild animals" in regions outside of Africa.

In August, the first-known case of probable human-to-dog transmission was reported with the canine exhibiting very similar signs and symptoms of mpox infection to that of humans.

== Chronology ==
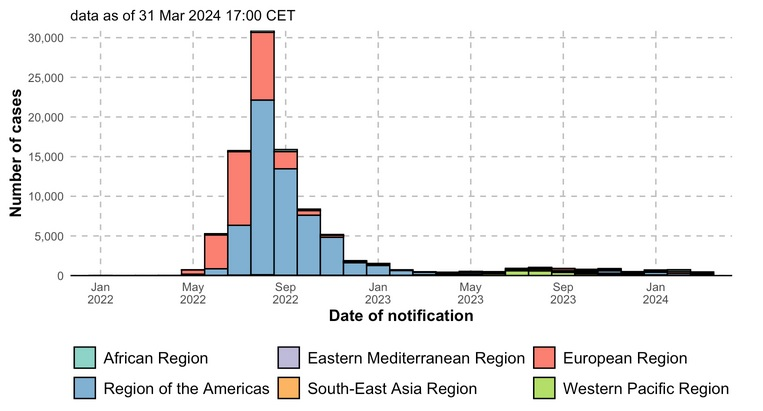
Epidemic curve shown by month for mpox cases reported to WHO up to 31 March 2024

In the beginning of May 2022, a case of mpox in a British resident who had travelled to Lagos and Delta State in Nigeria, in areas where mpox is considered to be an endemic disease, was reported. The person developed a rash on 29 April while in Nigeria and flew back to the United Kingdom, arriving on 4 May, and presented to hospital later the same day. Mpox infection was immediately suspected, and the patient was hospitalised at a specialist clinical unit of the Guy's and St Thomas' NHS Foundation Trust and isolated, then tested positive for the virus on 6 May. Testing of patient swab samples by polymerase chain reaction revealed clade II of monkeypox virus, which is the less deadly of the two known monkeypox virus variants with a case fatality rate of around 1%. The genomic sequence of the virus associated with this outbreak was first published on 19 May by Portuguese researchers.

Extensive contact tracing of people who had been in contact with the index case both on the international flight from Nigeria to the United Kingdom and within the country following their arrival was carried out, with potential contacts advised to remain aware of the symptoms of mpox and immediately isolate if any were to develop within 21 days of the contact event. Following this contact tracing effort, the World Health Organization (WHO) considered further transmission of the virus within the United Kingdom to be of "minimal" risk. Contact tracing was extended to Scotland on 14 May according to Public Health Scotland. A "small number" of people in Scotland were ordered to self-isolate following close contact with the person initially reported to have been infected, although overall risk to the general public remained "very low".

On 12 May two new cases of mpox were confirmed by the UK Health Security Agency (UKHSA), both in London, living together in the same household, with no known link between them and the index case. One of the new cases was hospitalised at St Mary's Hospital, while the other case with milder symptoms was said to be self-isolating at home. On 17 May, another four cases of mpox were confirmed by the UKHSA in three Londoners and a person in North East England who had previously travelled to London.

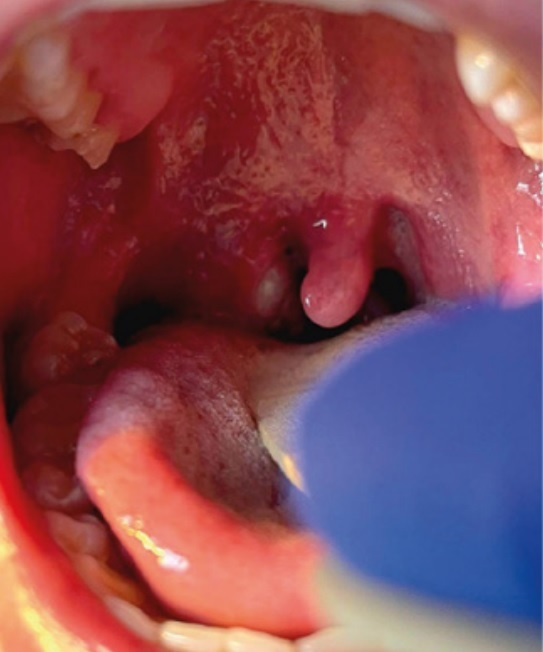
Right tonsillar enlargement with an overlying pustular lesion during the outbreak

Unusually, none of these new cases had any known contact history with the previous three confirmed cases, which suggested a kind of transmission that had not been seen before, a wider community transmission of the virus in the London area. The UKHSA stated that the risk to the general public remained "very low". Patients with active mpox infection were confirmed to be hospitalised at the Royal Victoria Infirmary in Newcastle upon Tyne and at the Royal Free Hospital and Guy's Hospital in London.

Also on 20 May, UK Health Secretary Sajid Javid reported that another eleven cases had been confirmed, bringing the total in the country to twenty. UKHSA reported on 10 June that 311 of the 314 cases where sex was known were men, and that all of the 151 infected persons who filled out an additional questionnaire and answered questions about sexual practices were men who have sex with men, abbreviated MSM. Dr. Susan Hopkins from the UKHSA urged watchfulness among men who have sex with men. The UK Health Security Agency (UKHSA) advised people who have had close contact with a person infected with mpox to self-isolate for 21 days.

Further cases in multiple countries outside the endemic area were reported through the second half of May 2022. On 18 May, Portugal reported 14 cases of mpox. In Spain, there were seven confirmed cases as of 18 May. On the same day, the United States confirmed its first 2022 case of mpox and Canada reported 13 suspected cases.

On 19 May, Sweden, Belgium and Italy confirmed their first cases. On 20 May, Australia, Germany, France and the Netherlands confirmed their first cases. For the remainder of May, multiple European countries and Israel confirmed their first cases. The United Arab Emirates and Mexico also confirmed their first cases.

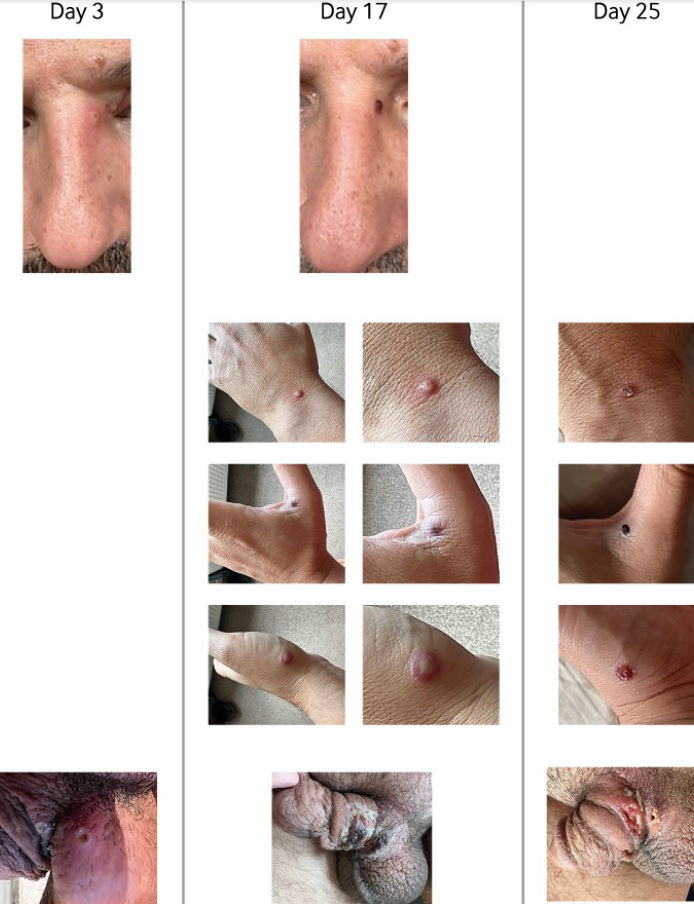
Stages of lesion development during the outbreak

On 23 May, David Heymann, an advisor for the World Health Organization, said that the likely theory of how the outbreak started is transmission during sexual intercourse of gay and bisexual men at two raves in Belgium and Spain. On 25 May, The Guardian stated that many scientists suspect the disease was circulating across Europe before reaching the MSM community, possibly misdiagnosed or detected only in isolated cases; four cases were diagnosed in 2018 and 2019, all in individuals who recently arrived from Nigeria.

In addition to more common symptoms, such as fever, headache, swollen lymph nodes, and rashes or lesions, some patients have also experienced proctitis, an inflammation of the rectum lining. CDC has also warned clinicians to not rule out mpox in patients with sexually transmitted infections since there have been reports of co-infections with syphilis, gonorrhea, chlamydia and herpes.

=== Deaths outside of Africa ===
The first death outside of endemic Africa was reported in Brazil on 29 July 2022, in a 41-year-old man with underlying comorbidities. On the same day Spain reported its first death, a 44-year-old man in Alicante, with the cause of death being encephalitis associated with mpox infection. Spain reported its second mpox-related death on 30 July 2022, in a 31-year-old man in Córdoba, who had also suffered from encephalitis according to reports. On 1 August 2022, India confirmed its first mpox death, a 22-year-old male who died in Thrissur, Kerala on 30 July. On the same day, Peru reported the death of a mpox-affected 45-year-old male, who also had HIV and septic shock.

On 30 August 2022, a Texan from Harris County became the first American to die of the mpox epidemic.

== Transmission ==
A large portion of those infected had not recently travelled to areas of Africa where mpox is endemic, such as Nigeria, the Democratic Republic of the Congo as well as central and western Africa. It is transmitted by close contact with infected people, with extra caution for those individuals with lesions on their skin or genitals, along with their bedding and clothing. The disease can spread via respiratory secretions or by direct contact with rashes, body fluids or by touching objects and fabrics that have been used by someone with mpox. The CDC has also stated that individuals should avoid contact and consumption of dead animals such as rats, squirrels, monkeys and apes along with wild game or lotions derived from animals in Africa.

=== Transmission patterns ===
The 2022–2023 outbreak initially had a different pattern of spread compared to prior mpox outbreaks outside Africa. Genetic evidence suggest the outbreak likely started in Nigeria. Given the unusually high frequency of human-to-human transmission observed in this event, and the probable community transmission without history of traveling to endemic areas, spread of the virus through close contact is more likely, with transmission during sexual activities being the most common route. Most cases have been in men. A significant proportion of cases, although not all, are in men who have sex with men (MSM), notably in Canada, Spain and the UK, with many cases diagnosed in sexual health clinics. Cases are mostly in young and middle-aged men. This points to transmission due to close contact during sex as being the main route of transmission. In May 2022, the European Centre for Disease Prevention and Control (ECDC) considered the monkeypox virus to be moderately transmissible among humans. According to the centre, among MSM who contracted the virus, the most common means of transmission is likely through sexual activity due to intimate contact with infectious skin lesions. The ECDC rated likelihood of transmission due to close contact, including sexual contact, as "high", but, without close contact, as low. In Nature, Anne Rimoin and Raina MacIntyre speculate that the higher percentage of MSM affected is a result of coincidental introduction to the community and then sexual activity constituting "close contact" rather than the virus itself becoming sexually transmitted. However, in a study published in August 2022, infectious monkeypox virus was able to be isolated from semen samples, and the prolonged shedding of virus in seminal fluids raised the possibility of a genital reservoir for human mpox.

On 21 July, a study on a sample of 528 infections diagnosed between 27 April and 24 June outside endemic regions in Africa indicated that: 99% cases were in men; 98% of cases occurred in the community of men who have sex with men (MSM), mainly those who have multiple sex partners (median of 5 partners in the previous 3 months); 75% were white; 41% had HIV/AIDS, of which 96% were on antiretroviral therapy, while 57% of the persons who were not known to have HIV infection were on pre-exposure prophylaxis; 29% had another concomitant sexually transmitted infection; and in the previous month, 32% attended a sex on premises venue and 20% engaged in chemsex. On 2 August, data collected by the Joint ECDC–WHO Regional Office for Europe Mpox Surveillance indicated that 99% (15,439/15,572) of the cases reported throughout the European region were among males, with 44% among MSM, 1% among heterosexuals and another 55% in males whose sexual orientation is unknown. Among cases with known HIV status, 36% (2,690/7,487) were HIV-positive.

A preprint suggests that cases "where a small fraction of individuals have disproportionately large numbers of partners, can explain the sustained growth of mpox cases among the MSM population".

The basic reproduction number during the initial phase of the 2022 global outbreak of mpox was estimated to be 1.29, and the herd immunity of mpox was estimated to be 24.94%.

As the mpox outbreak developed, nosocomial and other forms of human-to-human spread became apparent, with a notable example being a doctor in an Israeli hospital becoming infected probably while removing protective clothing after examining mpox patients. Contaminated surfaces within hospitals and households may be infectious, with widespread contamination of surface and air samples taken from mpox isolation rooms in UK hospitals being documented.

=== Wastewater surveillance ===
A study from the Faculty of Medicine at Chulalongkorn University reported multiple traces of monkeypox virus were detected in non-sewered wastewater with sparse sampling collected from both the Bangkok, Thailand with increasing concentrations from June to August 2022. Monkeypox viral DNA was first detected in wastewater in the second week of June 2022. From the first week of July, the number of viral DNA copies increased. Sanger sequencing confirmed the identification of the monkeypox virus and its relation to the 2022–2023 mpox outbreak.

== Interventions ==
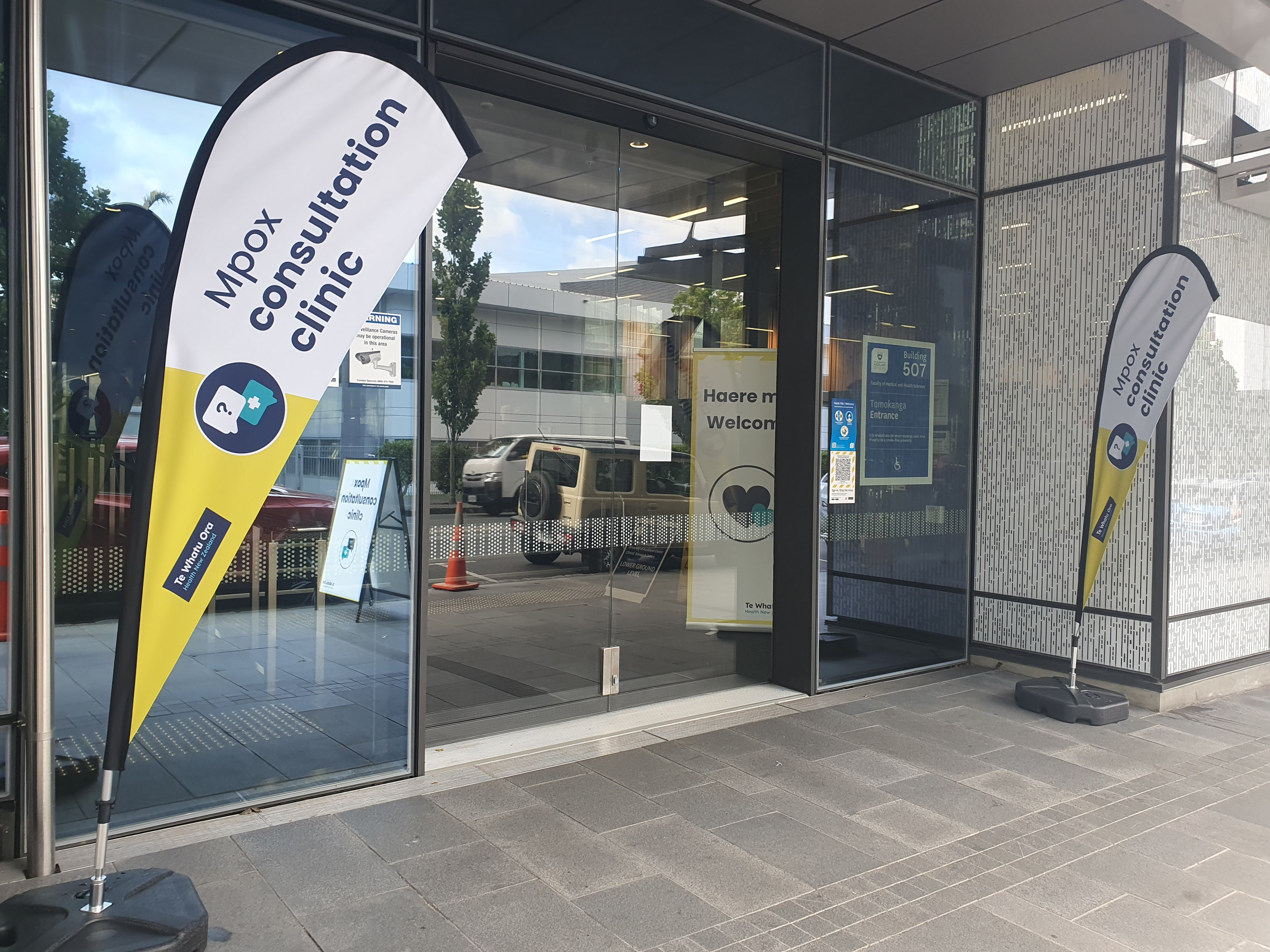
Mpox vaccination event in Auckland, New Zealand held in January 2023

=== Testing and containment ===
In early July 2022, scientists reported that the window to be able to contain the outbreak is closing or has closed. Previous attempts to control the disease had included encouraging individuals to quarantine or inoculation efforts directed at high-risk individuals. By late 23 July, the WHO declared the mpox a public health emergency due to its prevalence and spread in multiple countries. Mpox testing is done in various ways, usually using a swab or test sample from an infected persons lesions, throat, blood, or semen. Upon the recommendation of the WHO, PCR testing became the most common test for diagnosing mpox during the outbreak. PCR testing used genome sequencing to identify genomes which are unique to MPVX to use in diagnosis.

=== Vaccination ===
As of June 2022, ring-vaccinations and pre-exposure vaccination of MSM were strategies in some countries to contain the outbreak. Local transmission leading to sizeable clusters may have gone unnoticed for some time. Two vaccines are available. Smallpox vaccines containing vaccinia such as Imvanex (Jynneos) and ACAM2000 can provide around 85% effectiveness against mpox. This protection level is calculated from studies using smallpox vaccines tested in late 1980 in Africa. According to the CDC the vaccination with Jynneos/Imvanex is "[a]dministered as two subcutaneous injections four weeks apart" while the vaccination with ACAM2000 is "administered as one percutaneous dose via multiple puncture technique with a bifurcated needle". However, ACAM2000 is not recommended for potentially immunocompromised persons due to high replication competency of vaccinia while Imvanex (Jynneos) is recommended for potentially immunocompromised persons due it containing an attenuated, non-replicating orthopoxvirus, Modified Vaccinia Ankara-Bavarian Nordic (MVA-BN). The UKHSA has begun using Imvanex as post-exposure prophylaxis for close contacts of known cases.

On 25 May, disease experts from the NICD in South Africa said they saw no need for mass vaccination, because they believe cases will not explode as they did in the COVID-19 pandemic.

In reaction to this outbreak of mpox, a number of countries have stated they are buying vaccines and/or releasing vaccines from national stockpiles for use in the outbreak. In May 2022, the US, Spain, Germany and the UK all announced purchases of smallpox vaccine.

On 24 May, Centers for Disease Control (CDC) Deputy Director Jennifer McQuiston confirmed the United States is releasing some of their Jynneos vaccine supply from their Strategic National Stockpile for people who are "high-risk".

On 23 June, the New York City Department of Health announced a clinic at the Chelsea Sexual Health Clinic would offer the two-dose Jynneos vaccine to "...all gay, bisexual, and other men who have sex with men (cisgender or transgender) ages 18 and older who have had multiple or anonymous sex partners in the last 14 days". By 27 July, the federal government had distributed 300,000 doses to state and local health authorities, with distribution at clinics nation-wide, and was planning to release 786,000 more that week.

Bavarian Nordic is the only manufacturer of Jynneos in the world, and its manufacturing facility closed in spring 2022 to be refitted to make vaccines for other diseases using the MVA-BN technology. The company projects Jynneos manufacturing will restart in 2023, except for 15 million doses that just need final "fill and finish" repackaging. The United States helped fund the development of Jynneos, leading to concerns that existing contracts will lead to vaccine nationalism and hoarding, and prompting calls for allocating doses to lower-income countries via GAVI.

On 9 August, the FDA gave Emergency Use Authorization for intradermal (rather than subcutaneous) mpox vaccination using a lower dose of Jynneos, which would increase the number of available doses up to five-fold. The vaccination would still be given in two doses, 28 days apart. A 2015 study had tested a regimen of one-fifth dose given intradermally.

Another mpox vaccine, the modern LC16m8 vaccine, the only mpox vaccine approved for children, was developed in Japan as a national asset, and the manufacturer initially said it could not assist other countries. In August 2024, though, the Japanese government decided to send donations of the vaccine to the Democratic Republic of the Congo to help in their mitigation efforts.

== Social aspects ==
As of May 2022, public health authorities had aimed to target resources and health education to affected groups, but avoid stigma which could discourage people with symptoms or who have been exposed from seeking help. LGBT rights groups issued statements advising media to avoid stigmatizing marginalized groups such as men who have sex with men or transgender individuals. On 22 May, UNAIDS urged communicators to avoid stigma by taking an evidence-based approach, and reiterated that the disease can affect anyone and that risk is by no means limited to men who have sex with men.

On 24 May, The Washington Post published an article that pointed out the lack of global attention to the disease at a time when it only affected Africans, compared to the attention directed at it when a small number of cases started affecting Western countries. Some also objected to pictures used in media coverage of mild illnesses in Europe that featured severe cases in sub-Saharan Africans.

On 25 May, the World Health Organization released several statements and pamphlets aimed at gay and bisexual men describing the symptoms of mpox, as well as possible transmission routes. The statements emphasized that mpox was not a disease that was exclusive to the LGBT community, or to men, but that because these groups were disproportionately affected, the WHO felt they should tailor some health material to these groups.

On 26 July, Owen Jones of The Guardian argued that the focus needs to be on testing, awareness and vaccination, that targeted health messages help protect as many people as possible from the virus, and that those most at risk should be protected without stigma, noting that some members of the LGBT community already started to adjust behaviors to reduce risk.

On 30 July, Rod Dreher of The American Conservative criticized public health officials for not shutting down gay sex clubs in response to the outbreak. Similarly, many conservative commentators accused public health officials of hypocrisy for implementing strict restrictions in response to the COVID-19 pandemic while not encouraging other restrictions in response to mpox, such as shutting down sex parties and practicing abstinence. In response, public health officials have "reject[ed] comparisons to the early days of the coronavirus pandemic, when they mandated masks and shut down public spaces. They noted that the novel coronavirus was unfamiliar, far deadlier and airborne, with hospitals overrun with patients at various points over the past two years." and that "Monkeypox has known treatments and vaccines, although they have been challenging to access; it also has not killed anyone in the United States, and hospitalizations are uncommon."

An August survey by the CDC found that gay and bisexual men have significantly reduced sexual encounters in response to the mpox outbreak. An additional WHO survey, also conducted in August, showed similar patterns in queer men in Europe. Many of the men surveyed noted that they had reduced how often they went out with others, limited their number of sexual partners, or began temporarily practicing abstinence.

=== Misinformation ===
Misinformation and conspiracy theories immediately spread online in various social media networks. In an article published by the BBC in May 2022 countering misinformation about the mpox outbreak, journalist Rachel Schraer noted that social media accounts and news outlets from different countries including China, Russia, Ukraine and the United States have been promoting the idea that the outbreak was caused by a lab leak or that mpox is being used as a bioweapon. The Institute for Strategic Dialogue described this as "Reviving the spread of a set of cut-and-paste... conspiracies", referring to conspiracy theories used during the COVID-19 pandemic. The BBC also made it clear that the genetic sequences of the virus, as far as is known, date back to a West African strain. Some online misinformation also included claims that the COVID-19 vaccine included mpox or that mpox was going to be used to justify new widespread lockdowns akin to those that occurred during COVID-19.

== Responses ==
=== World Health Organization ===
On 20 May, the World Health Organization (WHO) convened an emergency meeting of independent advisers to discuss the outbreak and assess the threat level. Initial assessments expressed the expectation of the outbreak to be contained, and of low impact to the general population in affected countries. Its European chief, Hans Kluge, expressed concern that infections could accelerate in Europe as people gather for parties and festivals over the summer. On 1 June, a WHO statement acknowledged that undetected transmission had occurred for some time, and called for urgent action to reduce transmission. On 14 June, the WHO announced plans to rename disease from monkeypox to mpox to combat stigma and racism surrounding the disease. A meeting convened on 23 June determined that the outbreak did not constitute a public health emergency of international concern for the time being, but that decision was overturned by a later meeting on 23 July. After consistently dropping cases and several countries seemingly having a grasp on the outbreak, the WHO would declare the mpox epidemic over in May 2023. However, they continued to urge governments and their citizens to be wary of a potential resurgence of mpox.

=== Countries ===
- Algeria: The Pasteur Institute of Algeria issued a communiqué in May, in which the Institute described the origins of mpox in Sub-Saharan Africa, and recommended physical distancing, as well as the use of masks in crowded or enclosed places, in addition to avoiding contact with wild animals that may possess the virus.
- Armenia: On 28 July, Health Minister Anahit Avanesian told reporters that the country had not yet recorded any cases of mpox, but confirmed that the country had received test kits from Russia.
- Australia: On 28 July, the Chief Medical Officer of Australia declared the increasing presence of mpox "a communicable disease incident of national significance". On 4 August, the Health Minister announced the securing of 450,000 third-generation mpox vaccines.
- Bangladesh: On 22 May, the Directorate General of Health Services (DGHS) issued warnings at every port in the country to prevent the spread of mpox. The Directorate spokesperson said that they have asked all air, land and sea ports to be alert. Suspected cases are instructed to be sent to an infectious disease hospital and kept in isolation. Bangladesh became the first country to bar shore passes, after the Chittagong Seaport barred shore passes for all crew unless in the case of an emergency, while signed-off crew will have to undergo health checks.
- Belgium: The Risk Assessment Group (RAG) and health authorities declared that those infected with mpox must self-isolate for 21 days.
- Brazil: The Brazilian Ministry of Health created groups of biologists to monitor monkeys and medical groups to monitor possible cases. On 8 August 2022, during a podcast, the president of Brazil Jair Bolsonaro made homophobic jokes about the disease. When questioning the host about whether he would get a mpox vaccine, and the host says yes; Jair Bolsonaro replied: "I'm sure you want to get the vaccine. You don't fool me" followed by laughter. The host remains in his serious speech on the subject, Bolsonaro commented: "Don't you understand?" clarifying the homophobic tone of the comment.
- Botswana: In June, the Ministry of Health advised the population of Botswana to go to the nearest hospital in case of any unusual symptoms. In addition, the ministry advised to avoid close contact with other people.
- Cambodia: In May, Or Vandine, spokeswoman for the Ministry of Health, alerted the citizens of Cambodia that mpox could be lethal due to the lesions caused by this disease, which can lead to complications in the body's organs. In June 2022, the Cambodian government ordered screening under the supervision of health workers of all air, sea and land entry points in the country, in addition to ordering mandatory quarantine of anyone infected or in contact with people with the disease.
- Canada: On 21 April, Public Services and Procurement Canada published a tender request seeking to stockpile doses of smallpox vaccine to be prepared in the event of a future accidental or intentional release of the virus. The contract for 500,000 doses closed on 5 May, and was awarded to Bavarian Nordic. On 24 May, the Public Health Agency of Canada stated that they were in the process of extracting Imvamune vaccines from their National Emergency Strategic Stockpile for deployment across the country, starting with the province of Quebec. On 26 May, Quebec announced that Imvamune vaccines would be made available to those who have been in close contact with confirmed or suspected mpox cases. On 7 June, PHAC announced that travellers returning to Canada may be subject to a mandatory quarantine period if they become ill with mpox, and warned that quarantined travellers may have restricted access to health care and delays returning home.
- China: On 2 June, the Chinese CDC issued a notice quoting a WHO's document with a translation of the original "Stigmatising people because of a disease is never okay. Anyone can get or pass on monkeypox, regardless of their sexuality." On 10 June, the General office of the National Health Commission of the People's Republic of China and the Office of the State Administration of Traditional Chinese Medicine issued the Guidelines for the Diagnosis and Treatment of Monkeypox (2022 Version). On 25 July, after the declaration of mpox as a public health emergency of international concern by World Health Organization, the General Administration of Customs of the People's Republic of China issued the Announcement on Preventing Monkeypox from Spreading into China. In September 2022, the Chinese CDC's chief epidemiologist advised Chinese citizens to avoid "direct skin-to-skin contact with foreigners". Months after the end of the WHO public health emergency, in the late summer and early fall of 2023, China accounted for half of the world's new confirmed cases amid a spike in positive test results. At the time of the 2023 outbreak, it had not yet approved any of the three existing mpox vaccines for domestic use, with some analysts citing vaccine nationalism and homophobia as contributing factors.
- Colombia: As of May, the Colombian Ministry of Health was taking follow-up and control measures. The Director of Epidemiology and Demography of the Ministry of Health, Claudia Cuellar, informed the Colombian population about how mpox is spread through people, and she spoke about the clinical presentation of the virus and international health regulations. Health authorities in the Department of Norte de Santander have been on alert, since the department is a border area where people pass between Colombia and Venezuela.
- Dominican Republic: In May, the Ministry of Public Health of the Dominican Republic issued a preventive epidemiological alert after mpox was reported in several countries.
- Egypt: On 24 May, the Egyptian Ministry of Health and Population informed about measures to prevent new mpox infections, among them, was to wash hands with soap or use an alcohol-based hand sanitiser, in addition to using personal protective equipment such as masks. In addition, the Ministry informed that veterinary quarantine procedures should be taken for animals that present the disease.
- Fiji: The country's Centre for Disease Control and Border Health Protection Unit are monitoring the situation. The Ministry of Health has put in place infection prevention protocols at the border. Minister for Health Ifereimi Waqainabete said that the Ministry is on high alert after three suspected cases of mpox returned negative results.
- France: On 11 July 2022, Frances National Authority for Health released vaccines to the public with the hope of vaccinating vulnerable groups including sex workers and MSM communities. In total, the Directorate General of Health sent out 30,000 vaccines, though it was unclear how many were administered to citizens.
- Germany: Fabian Leendertz of the Robert Koch Institute described the outbreak as an epidemic that would not last long: "The cases can be well isolated via contact tracing and there are also drugs and effective vaccines that can be used if necessary."
- Guatemala: On 26 May, the Minister of Health of Guatemala, Francisco Coma, informed that the Ministry declared an epidemiological alert on the borders of the Central American country, with the objective of detecting possible cases of mpox. The minister also mentioned that one of the main transmissions of mpox is from injuries and body fluids as well as contact with contaminated clothing.
- India: Union Health Minister Mansukh Mandaviya directed the National Centre for Disease Control and the ICMR to keep a close watch and monitor the situation. The Union Health Ministry has also directed airport and port health officers to be vigilant, according to official sources. They have been instructed to isolate and send samples to the National Institute of Virology of any sick passenger with a travel history to infected countries.
- Indonesia: When cases of mpox were reported in Australia in May 2022, they triggered the alert of health authorities in Indonesia. Mohammad Syahril, ministry spokesperson, urged medical personnel and the country's population to be alert and aware of the symptoms of the disease.
- Ireland: The Health Service Executive (HSE) has set up a multidisciplinary incident management team to prepare for the possible arrival of mpox, and infectious diseases experts are on alert for patients with symptoms of the virus. On 26 July, the Government of Ireland confirmed the issuing of a vaccination for specific groups and to increase awareness.
- Japan: The Japanese health ministry confirmed its first case of mpox on 25 July 2022. It was detected from a man in his 30s residing in the Tokyo area.
- Kosovo: On 23 May, the Ministry of Health and the National Public Health Institute drafted a document of recommendations and measures to help prevent the spread of the disease. In a press statement, healthcare authorities have declared that the situation is being closely monitored.
- Luxembourg: On 21 May, the Ministry of Health said that they were monitoring the situation with Europe. The National Infectious Diseases Department of the HLC and refrained from close contact activities until the infection has resolved.
- Malaysia: On 27 May, the Malaysian Ministry of Health reactivated the MySejahtera app to provide information and surveillance on mpox.
- Mexico: In May, Mexican health authorities have posted notices in clinics and hospitals for the purpose of identifying suspected cases in the country. In addition, the Ministry of Health issued an epidemiological alert on 26 May 2022.
- Morocco: In May, several regional directors of the Moroccan Ministry of Health coordinated a surveillance system for mpox with the Directorate of Epidemiology and Disease Control to prevent cases of mpox from European countries from spreading to Morocco, according to the Al Akhbar newspaper. Due to the "Marhaba 2022" operation, an operation that aims to facilitate the travel of Moroccans living abroad by sea when they travel during the summer period, sanitary measures have already been put in place.
- Netherlands: The Netherlands started vaccinating people considered 'at risk' for mpox infection at the end of July 2022. This includes people on pre-exposure prophylaxis for HIV prevention.
- Nigeria: The director general of the NCDC, Ifedayo Adetifa, advised the Nigerian population to avoid eating bush meat to prevent new mpox infections, in addition to storing food properly to avoid being contaminated by rodents, as mpox is a viral zoonosis.
- Philippines: Former health secretary Francisco Duque III said that the Philippines was intensifying its border control measures amid the threat of the monkeypox virus. The health department stated it is exploring potential sources of mpox vaccines and antivirals.
- Saudi Arabia: On 21 May, the Saudi Ministry of Health stated that they are ready to monitor and investigate cases of mpox, if any occurs. They added that it also has an integrated preventive plan to deal with such cases if they appear, including identifying suspected and confirmed cases.
- Senegal: Badara Ly of the Ministry of Health and Social Action, spoke about the creation of a contingency plan in Senegal during an online conference with the WHO in May, in addition the doctor alerted the health system and advised the creation of fact sheets on prevention methods and reinforcement of screening in border areas.
- South Africa: On 26 May, the National Institute for Communicable Diseases (NICD) gave a communiqué on how the virus is transmitted, and the institute stated that the 2022 outbreak is the largest outbreak of mpox outside of endemic regions. In addition, the NICD affirmed that the virus mainly spreads in tropical forest areas in West and Central Africa.
- Taiwan: On 30 May, the Taiwan Centers for Disease Control officially listed mpox as a notifiable infectious disease, and on 23 June, mpox was officially upgraded to a second-class notifiable infectious disease, which means that confirmed cases must be notified within 24 hours, and if necessary, isolation treatment may be implemented in designated isolation treatment institutions.
- Thailand: On 24 May, the Department of Disease Control (DDC) started screening all overseas passengers from Central African countries and other outbreak countries at international airports. On 26 May 2022, the DDC set up an emergency operations center to monitor the outbreak situation and plan for a possible outbreak in the kingdom. Anutin Charnvirakul, Minister of Public Health, said that the government is seeking a smallpox vaccine from the WHO to bolster the public's immunity in case of a viral outbreak. On 30 May, the local news reported the first case of mpox in the country. The patient was a passenger who was transiting from Europe to Australia via Bangkok. However, the patient's symptoms developed and were diagnosed in Australia. Multiple traces of mpox DNA were detected in non-sewered wastewater in Bangkok between late June and August, and the first clinical case was reported on 21 July.
- United Kingdom: On 22 May, Education Secretary Nadhim Zahawi said "we're taking it very, very seriously" and that the UK government had already started purchasing smallpox vaccines. The Terrence Higgins Trust and British Association for Sexual Health and HIV (BASHH) expressed concern about the impact on sexual health services in the United Kingdom.
- United States: On 22 May, President Joe Biden commented "they haven't told me the level of exposure yet but it is something that everybody should be concerned about". National security advisor Jake Sullivan told reporters the US has a vaccine that is relevant to treating mpox. On 25 May, the CDC issued an alert for gay and bisexual men to be especially vigilant. In addition, the CDC placed its mpox travel alert at "Level 2", following reports of cases in Australia and several countries in Europe. Beginning 18 July, Sonic Healthcare USA started testing for mpox using CDC's orthopoxvirus test, which includes monkeypox virus at Sonic Reference Laboratory in Austin, Texas.
- Vietnam: On 24 May, Vietnam's Ministry of Health asked border localities to increase surveillance to detect possible cases of mpox.

=== Dependent territories ===
- Gibraltar: On 31 May, a Strategic Coordination Group met to discuss Gibraltar's state of preparedness in the eventuality that a case of mpox was confirmed in the territory amid the rapid rise of cases in the United Kingdom and Spain.

== Cases per country and territory ==
This is a table of confirmed mpox cases in countries and territories during 2022. Countries whose 2022 timeline precede the 6 May index case are shaded orange. The table does not include countries where suspected cases were reported but later discarded.

Cases per country and territory in 2022
Country	Confirmed cases	Deaths	Last case update	First confirmed case/data taken	First confirmed death	Last confirmed death	Clade
Andorra	4	0	5 August 2022	2 July 2022			
Argentina	1,127	2	13 April 2023	27 May 2022	29 November 2022		
Aruba (Note: Constituent country of the Kingdom of the Netherlands)	3	0	26 October 2022	22 August 2022			
Australia	144	0	8 December 2022	20 May 2022			
Austria	327	0	13 December 2022	22 May 2022			
Bahamas	2	0	22 August 2022	30 June 2022			
Bahrain	1	0	16 September 2022	16 September 2022			
Barbados	1	0	16 July 2022	16 July 2022			
Belgium	793	2	15 March 2023	19 May 2022	August 2022		
Benin	3	0	14 June 2022	14 June 2022			
Bermuda (Note: British Overseas Territory)	1	0	22 July 2022	22 July 2022			
Bolivia	265	2	1 March 2023	1 August 2022	7 October 2022		
Bosnia and Herzegovina	9	0	12 October 2022	13 July 2022			
Brazil	10,897	15	13 April 2023	17 June 2022	29 July 2022		
Bulgaria	6	0	19 September 2022	23 June 2022			
Cameroon	18	3	4 January 2023	1 January 2022 – 1 August 2022	?		Clade I and Clade II
Canada	1,480	0	13 April 2023	19 May 2022			
Central African Republic	29	1	15 April 2023	February 2022 – 1 August 2022	February 2022		Clade I
Chile	1,439	2	13 April 2023	17 June 2022	16 November 2022		
China	1,100	0	17 September 2023	16 September 2022			
Colombia	4,089	0	13 April 2023	23 June 2022			
Republic of the Congo	5	0	26 September 2022	1 January 2022 – August 2022	April 2022		Clade I
Costa Rica	227	1	13 April 2023	20 July 2022	15 March 2023		
Croatia	33	0	24 January 2023	23 June 2022			
Cuba	8	1	12 October 2022	21 August 2022	23 August 2022		
Curaçao	3	0	26 October 2022	19 August 2022			
Cyprus	5	0	29 August 2022	2 August 2022			
Czech Republic	71	1	13 December 2022	24 May 2022	22 September 2022		
Democratic Republic of the Congo	206	0	9 November 2022	1 January 2022 – August 2022	January 2022		Clade I
Denmark	196	0	15 February 2023	23 May 2022			
Dominican Republic	52	0	23 November 2022	6 July 2022			
Ecuador	530	3	13 April 2023	6 July 2022	8 August 2022		
Egypt	3	0	22 December 2022	7 September 2022			
El Salvador	104	0	13 April 2023	30 August 2022			
Estonia	11	0	19 September 2022	28 June 2022			
Finland	42	0	13 December 2022	27 May 2022			
France	5,002	0	27 April 2023	20 May 2022			
Georgia	2	0	18 August 2022	19 July 2022			
Germany	3,692	0	1 February 2023	20 May 2022			
Ghana	123	4	15 March 2023	8 June 2022	31 July 2022		
Gibraltar	6	0	11 August 2022	1 June 2022			
Greece	87	0	15 March 2023	8 June 2022			
Greenland	2	0	9 August 2022	9 August 2022			
Guadeloupe (Note: Part of Overseas France) (Note: Overseas Department of France)	1	0	25 July 2022	25 July 2022			
Guam (Note: Unincorporated territory of the United States)	1	0	12 September 2022	12 September 2022			
Guatemala	404	1	13 April 2023	3 August 2022	13 April 2023		
Guyana	2	0	29 August 2022	22 August 2022			
Honduras	40	1	15 March 2023	12 August 2022	13 April 2023		
Hong Kong (Note: Special administrative region of China)	91	0	6 September 2022	6 September 2022			
Hungary	80	0	26 October 2022	31 May 2022			
Iceland	16	0	7 October 2022	9 June 2022			
India	22	1	24 January 2023	14 July 2022	1 August 2022		
Indonesia	34	0	6 November 2023	19 August 2022			
Iran	1	0	16 August 2022	16 August 2022			
Ireland	228	0	13 April 2023	27 May 2022			
Israel	262	0	31 October 2022	21 May 2022			
Italy	957	0	1 March 2023	19 May 2022			
Jamaica	21	0	13 April 2023	6 July 2022			
Japan	95	0	13 April 2023	25 July 2022			
Jersey (Note: British Crown Dependency)	1	0	23 July 2022	23 July 2022			
Jordan	1	0	16 September 2022	16 September 2022			
Latvia	6	0	7 October 2022	3 June 2022			
Lebanon	27	0	15 March 2023	20 June 2022			
Liberia	10	0	13 April 2023	23 July 2022			
Lithuania	5	0	11 August 2022	3 August 2022			
Luxembourg	57	0	16 November 2022	15 June 2022			
Malta	34	0	13 April 2023	28 May 2022			
Martinique	7	0	15 September 2022	17 July 2022			
Mayotte	2	0	5 September 2022	27 August 2022			
Mexico	3,956	10	13 April 2023	28 May 2022			
Moldova	2	0	16 August 2022	8 August 2022			
Monaco	3	0	11 August 2022	22 July 2022			
Montenegro	2	0	26 August 2022	31 July 2022			
Morocco	3	0	25 August 2022	2 June 2022			
Mozambique	1	0	5 October 2022	5 October 2022			
Netherlands	1,262	0	15 March 2023	20 May 2022			
New Caledonia (Note: Sui generis collectivity of France)	1	0	12 July 2022	12 July 2022			
New Zealand	41	0	24 January 2023	9 July 2022			
Nigeria	604	7	9 November 2022	1 January 2022 – 7 August 2022	29 May 2022		Clade II
Norway	95	0	1 February 2023	31 May 2022			
Panama	221	0	13 April 2023	5 July 2022			
Paraguay	122	0	13 April 2023	25 August 2022			
Peru	3,800	20	13 April 2023	26 June 2022	1 August 2022		
Philippines	4	0	22 August 2022	28 July 2022			
Poland	215	0	24 January 2023	10 June 2022			
Portugal	953	0	13 April 2023	18 May 2022			
Puerto Rico	198	0	4 November 2022	29 June 2022			
Qatar	5	0	4 October 2022	20 July 2022			
Réunion	1	0	15 September 2022	14 September 2022			
Romania	47	0	18 January 2023	13 June 2022			
Russia	2	0	8 September 2022	12 July 2022			
Saint Martin	1	0	1 August 2022	1 August 2022			
San Marino	1	0	20 October 2022	20 October 2022			
Saudi Arabia	8	0	19 September 2022	14 July 2022			
Serbia	40	0	6 October 2022	17 June 2022			
Singapore	22	0	13 April 2023	20 June 2022			
Slovakia	14	0	19 September 2022	12 July 2022			
Slovenia	47	0	26 September 2022	24 May 2022			
Somalia	—		9 June 2022	—			
South Africa	5	0	19 August 2022	23 June 2022			
South Korea	184	0	17 August 2023	22 June 2022			
Spain	7,549	4	13 April 2023	18 May 2022	29 July 2022		
Sudan	19	1	13 April 2023	31 July 2022			
Sri Lanka	2	0	2 December 2022	4 November 2022			
Sweden	260	0	1 February 2023	19 May 2022			
Switzerland	552	0	15 March 2023	21 May 2022			
Taiwan (Note: Non-member of the United Nations with limited recognition by some UN member states)	76	0	2 September 2023	24 June 2022			
Thailand	219	0	21 August 2023	21 July 2022			
Turkey	12	0	26 October 2022	30 June 2022			
Ukraine	5	0	26 October 2022	15 September 2022			
United Arab Emirates	16	0	24 July 2022	24 May 2022			
United Kingdom	3,738	0	4 May 2023	6 May 2022			
United States	30,395	42	10 May 2023	18 May 2022	30 August 2022		
Uruguay	19	0	22 December 2022	29 July 2022			
Venezuela	12	0	12 January 2023	12 June 2022			
Vietnam	2	0	20 October 2022	3 October 2022			
Zambia	—		20 June 2022	—			
Total	87,844	119					

=== Timeline of first confirmed cases by country or territory ===
First confirmed mpox cases by country or territory in 2022
Date	Countries / Territories
From 1 January	Cameroon • Republic of the Congo • Democratic Republic of the Congo • Nigeria
From February	Central African Republic
6 May 2022	United Kingdom
18 May 2022	Portugal • Spain • United States
19 May 2022	Belgium • Canada • Italy • Sweden
20 May 2022	Australia • France • Germany • Netherlands
21 May 2022	Israel • Switzerland
22 May 2022	Austria
23 May 2022	Denmark
24 May 2022	Czech Republic • Slovenia • United Arab Emirates
27 May 2022	Argentina • Finland • Ireland
28 May 2022	Malta • Mexico
31 May 2022	Hungary • Norway
1 June 2022	Gibraltar (Note: British Overseas Territory.)
2 June 2022	Morocco
3 June 2022	Latvia
8 June 2022	Ghana • Greece
9 June 2022	Brazil • Iceland
10 June 2022	Poland
12 June 2022	Venezuela
13 June 2022	Romania
14 June 2022	Benin
15 June 2022	Georgia • Luxembourg
17 June 2022	Chile • Serbia
20 June 2022	Lebanon • Singapore
22 June 2022	South Korea
23 June 2022	Bulgaria • Colombia • Croatia • South Africa
24 June 2022	Taiwan (Note: Non-member of the United Nations with limited recognition by some UN member states.)
26 June 2022	Peru
28 June 2022	Estonia
29 June 2022	Puerto Rico (Note: Unincorporated territory of the United States.)
30 June 2022	Bahamas • Turkey
2 July 2022	Andorra
5 July 2022	Panama
6 July 2022	Dominican Republic • Ecuador • Jamaica
7 July 2022	Slovakia
9 July 2022	New Zealand
12 July 2022	New Caledonia (Note: Sui generis collectivity of France.) (Note: Part of Overseas France.) • Russia
13 July 2022	Bosnia and Herzegovina
14 July 2022	India • Saudi Arabia
16 July 2022	Barbados
17 July 2022	Martinique (Note: Single territorial collectivity and Overseas Department of France.)
20 July 2022	Costa Rica • Qatar
21 July 2022	Thailand
22 July 2022	Monaco • Bermuda
23 July 2022	Jersey (Note: British Crown Dependency.) • Liberia
25 July 2022	Guadeloupe • Japan
29 July 2022	Philippines • Uruguay
31 July 2022	Montenegro • Sudan
1 August 2022	Bolivia • Collectivity of Saint Martin
2 August 2022	Cyprus
3 August 2022	Guatemala • Lithuania
8 August 2022	Moldova
9 August 2022	Greenland (Note: Constituent country of the Kingdom of Denmark.)
12 August 2022	Honduras
16 August 2022	Iran
19 August 2022	Indonesia
22 August 2022	Aruba (Note: Constituent country of the Kingdom of the Netherlands.) • Guyana
24 August 2022	Curaçao
25 August 2022	Paraguay
27 August 2022	Mayotte
30 August 2022	El Salvador
6 September 2022	Hong Kong (Note: Special administrative region of China.)
7 September 2022	Egypt
12 September 2022	Guam
14 September 2022	Réunion
16 September 2022	China • Jordan • Ukraine • Bahrain
3 October 2022	Vietnam
5 October 2022	Mozambique
20 October 2022	San Marino
4 November 2022	Sri Lanka

=== Timeline of suspected cases by country or territory ===
Countries listed below had only suspected cases at the time of reporting. Some countries reported confirmed cases after reporting suspected cases (i.e. Greece, Morocco, Turkey, Ecuador, Peru). Countries listed several times reported suspected cases again after they discarded suspected cases before.

Timeline of suspected mpox cases by country or territory
Date	Countries / Territories
20 May 2022	Greece (discounted on 22 May) • Israel (confirmed on 21 May)
23 May 2022	French Guiana (Note: Single territorial collectivity and Overseas Department of France.) (Note: Part of Overseas France) (discounted on 1 June) • Morocco (discounted on 25 May)
25 May 2022	Bolivia (discounted between 3 and 10 June) • Sudan (discounted on 3 June)
27 May 2022	Ecuador (discounted on 30 May) • Iran (discounted on 4 June) • Malaysia (discounted on 31 May)
29 May 2022	Afghanistan (discounted between 31 May and 5 June)
30 May 2022	Peru (discounted on 2 June) • Brazil (confirmed cases reported on 9 June)
1 June 2022	Costa Rica (discounted on 4 June) • Haiti (discounted on 5 July) • Paraguay (discounted on 7 June)
2 June 2022	Cambodia (discounted on 2 June) • Cayman Islands (Note: British Overseas Territory) (discounted on 30 June) • Mauritius (discounted on 10 June) • Uruguay (confirmed cases reported on 29 July)
3 June 2022	India (discounted on 7 June)
4 June 2022	Kosovo (discounted on 15 June) • Turkey (discounted on 5 June)
5 June 2022	Georgia (confirmed on 15 June)
7 June 2022	Bahamas (confirmed cases reported on 30 June) • Bangladesh (discounted on 9 June)
8 June 2022	Uganda (discounted on 1 July)
9 June 2022	Somalia
14 June 2022	Ecuador (discounted on 15 June)
15 June 2022	Libya (discounted on 13 July)
16 June 2022	Nepal (discounted on 17 June)
20 June 2022	Zambia
21 June 2022	South Korea (confirmed on 22 June)
24 June 2022	Fiji (discounted on 28 June)
8 July 2022	India (discounted on 9 July)
14 July 2022	India (confirmed on 14 July)

=== Timeline of first deaths by country or territory (in countries with initial 2022 detection from 6 May onwards) ===
Timeline of mpox deaths by country or territory
Date	Countries / territories
29 July 2022	Brazil • Spain
31 July 2022	Ghana
1 August 2022	India • Peru
8 August 2022	Ecuador
23 August 2022	Cuba • Mexico
30 August 2022	United States • Belgium
22 September 2022	Czech Republic
24 September 2022	Sudan
7 October 2022	Bolivia
16 November 2022	Chile
29 November 2022	Argentina

== See also ==
- Mpox in the Democratic Republic of the Congo
- Mpox in Nigeria
- 2023 Crimean–Congo hemorrhagic fever outbreak
- 2024 mpox epidemic
