= 2022–2023 mpox outbreak in South Africa =

Outbreak of mpox in South Africa

- Disease: Human mpox
- Location: South Africa
- Arrival date: 23 June 2022 – ongoing (3 years, 10 months, and 26 days)
- Date: June 29th, 2022
- Confirmed cases: 4
- Deaths: 0

The 2022–2023 mpox outbreak in South Africa is a part of the larger outbreak of human mpox caused by the West African clade of the monkeypox virus. South Africa was the forty-seventh country, outside of the African countries with endemic mpox, to experience an outbreak in 2022. The first case of mpox in South Africa was on June 23, 2022.

== Background ==
Mpox (/ˈɛmpɒks/, EM-poks; originally known as monkeypox) is an infectious viral disease that can occur in humans and other animals. Symptoms include a rash that forms blisters and then crusts over, as well as fever and swollen lymph nodes. The illness is usually mild, and most infected individuals recover within a few weeks without treatment. The time from exposure to the onset of symptoms ranges from three to seventeen days, and symptoms typically last from two to four weeks. However, cases may be severe, especially in children, pregnant women, or people with suppressed immune systems.

The disease is caused by the monkeypox virus, a zoonotic virus in the genus Orthopoxvirus. The variola virus, which causes smallpox, is also in this genus. Human-to-human transmission can occur through direct contact with infected skin or body fluids, including sexual contact. People remain infectious from the onset of symptoms until all the lesions have scabbed and healed. The virus may spread from infected animals through handling infected meat or via bites or scratches. Diagnosis can be confirmed by polymerase chain reaction (PCR) testing a lesion for the virus's DNA.

Vaccination is recommended for those at high risk of infection. No vaccine has been developed specifically against mpox, but smallpox vaccines have been found to be effective. There is no specific treatment for the disease, so the aim of treatment is to manage the symptoms and prevent complications. Antiviral drugs such as tecovirimat can be used to treat mpox, although their effectiveness has not been proven.

An ongoing outbreak of mpox was confirmed on 6 May 2022, beginning with a British resident who, after travelling to Nigeria (where the disease is endemic), presented symptoms consistent with mpox on 29 April 2022. The resident returned to the United Kingdom on 4 May, creating the country's index case of the outbreak. The origin of several of the cases of mpox in the United Kingdom is unknown. Some monitors saw community transmission taking place in the London area as of mid-May, but it has been suggested that cases were already spreading in Europe in the previous months.

== Transmission ==
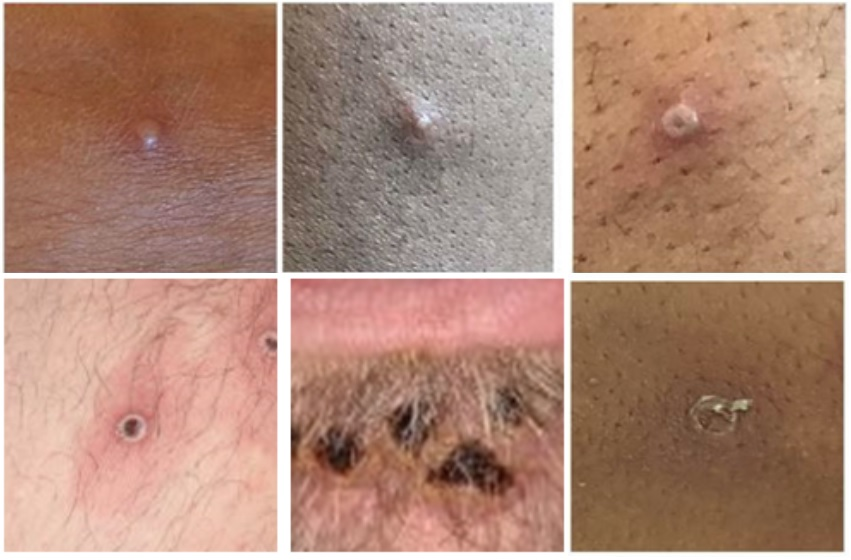
Stages of lesion development.

A large portion of those infected were believed to have not recently traveled to areas of Africa where mpox is normally found, such as Nigeria, the Democratic Republic of the Congo as well as central and western Africa. It is believed to be transmitted by close contact with sick people, with extra caution for those individuals with lesions on their skin or genitals, along with their bedding and clothing. The CDC has also stated that individuals should avoid contact and consumption of dead animals such as rats, squirrels, monkeys and apes along with wild game or lotions derived from animals in Africa.

In addition to more common symptoms, such as fever, headache, swollen lymph nodes, and rashes or lesions, some patients have also experienced proctitis, an inflammation of the rectum lining. CDC has also warned clinicians to not rule out mpox in patients with sexually transmitted infections since there have been reports of co-infections with syphilis, gonorrhea, chlamydia, and herpes.

== History ==
The first known case of mpox in South Africa was detected on Thursday, 23 June 2022 declared by the health minister of South Africa Joe Phaahla. The first victim was a 30-year-old man who had no recent travel history, meaning that he has not contacted the disease outside the country. 5 days later on the 28th of June, South Africa confirmed its second case of mpox. The victim also had no recent travel history. On 11 July 2022 South Africa confirmed third case of mpox, the 42 year old is a tourist from Switzerland who came to South Africa to enjoy his holidays. On the second week of August 2022 Minister of Health South Africa announced the 4th case of mpox in South Africa the victim recently arrived from Spain.

== See also ==
- 2022–2023 mpox outbreak in Asia
- 2022–2023 mpox outbreak in Europe
- 2022–2023 mpox outbreak in Canada
- 2022–2023 mpox outbreak in Germany
- 2022–2023 mpox outbreak in the Netherlands
- 2022–2023 mpox outbreak in Portugal
- 2022–2023 mpox outbreak in Spain
- 2022–2023 mpox outbreak in the United Kingdom
- 2022–2023 mpox outbreak in the United States
- Mpox in Nigeria
- Mpox in the Democratic Republic of the Congo
