= 2022–2023 mpox outbreak in Australia =

Disease outbreak in Australia

- Disease: Mpox
- Pathogen: Monkeypox virus (West African clade)
- Location: Australia
- Index case: Sydney
- Arrival date: May 20, 2022–present (4 years, 4 months and 6 days)
- Confirmed cases: >140

The 2022–2023 mpox outbreak in Australia is a part of the outbreak of human mpox caused by the West African clade of the monkeypox virus. The outbreak reached Australia on 20 May 2022. By 28 October 2022 there were over 140 confirmed cases. The Chief Medical Officer of Australia stood down the country's Communicable Disease Incident of National Significance declaration on 25 November 2022.

== Background ==
Mpox (/ˈɛmpɒks/, EM-poks; originally known as monkeypox) is an infectious viral disease that can occur in humans and other animals. Symptoms include a rash that forms blisters and then crusts over, as well as fever and swollen lymph nodes. The illness is usually mild, and most infected individuals recover within a few weeks without treatment. The time from exposure to the onset of symptoms ranges from three to seventeen days, and symptoms typically last from two to four weeks. However, cases may be severe, especially in children, pregnant women, or people with suppressed immune systems.

The disease is caused by the monkeypox virus, a zoonotic virus in the genus Orthopoxvirus. The variola virus, which causes smallpox, is also in this genus. Human-to-human transmission can occur through direct contact with infected skin or body fluids, including sexual contact. People remain infectious from the onset of symptoms until all the lesions have scabbed and healed. The virus may spread from infected animals through handling infected meat or via bites or scratches. Diagnosis can be confirmed by polymerase chain reaction (PCR) testing a lesion for the virus's DNA.

Vaccination is recommended for those at high risk of infection. No vaccine has been developed specifically against mpox, but smallpox vaccines have been found to be effective. There is no specific treatment for the disease, so the aim of treatment is to manage the symptoms and prevent complications. Antiviral drugs such as tecovirimat can be used to treat mpox, although their effectiveness has not been proven.

In May 2022, the World Health Organization (WHO) made an emergency announcement of the existence of a multi-country outbreak of mpox, a viral disease then commonly known as "monkeypox". The initial cluster of cases was found in the United Kingdom, where the first case was detected in London on 6 May 2022 in a patient with a recent travel history from Nigeria where the disease has been endemic. On 16 May, the UK Health Security Agency (UKHSA) confirmed four new cases with no link to travel to a country where mpox is endemic. Subsequently, cases have been reported from many countries and regions. The outbreak marked the first time mpox had spread widely outside Central and West Africa. The disease had been circulating and evolving in human hosts over several years before the outbreak and was caused by the clade IIb variant of the virus.

On 23 July 2022, the director-general of the WHO, Tedros Adhanom Ghebreyesus, declared the outbreak a public health emergency of international concern (PHEIC), stating that "we have an outbreak that has spread around the world rapidly, through new modes of transmission, about which we understand too little". A global response to the outbreak included public awareness campaigns in order to reduce spread of the disease, and repurposing of smallpox vaccines.

== Transmission ==
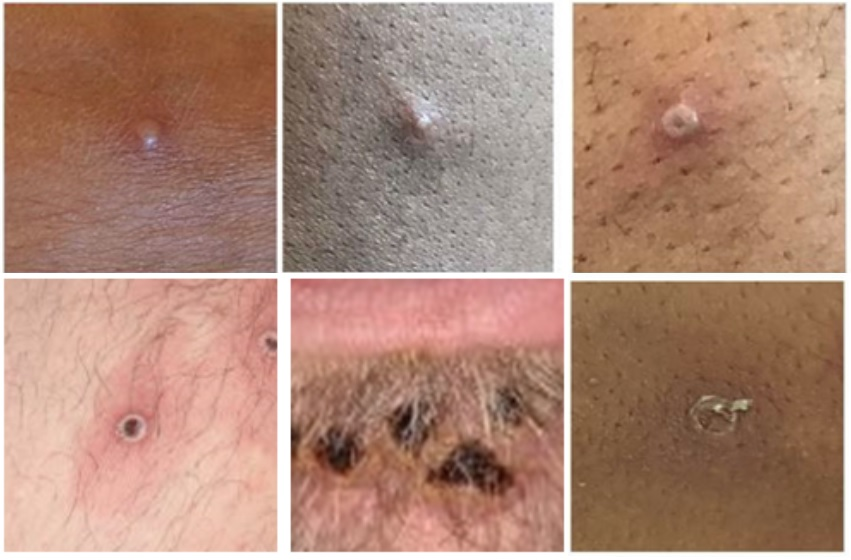
Stages of lesion development. Picture taken by Dr O.O. Afuye on 15 September 2019.

A large portion of those infected were believed to have not recently traveled to areas of Africa where mpox is normally found, such as Nigeria, the Democratic Republic of the Congo as well as central and western Africa. It is believed to be transmitted by close contact with sick people, with extra caution for those individuals with lesions on their skin or genitals, along with their bedding and clothing. The CDC has also stated that individuals should avoid contact and consumption of dead animals such as rats, squirrels, monkeys and apes along with wild game or lotions derived from animals in Africa.

In addition to more common symptoms, such as fever, headache, swollen lymph nodes, and rashes or lesions, some patients have also experienced proctitis, an inflammation of the rectum lining. CDC has also warned clinicians to not rule out mpox in patients with sexually transmitted infections since there have been reports of co-infections with syphilis, gonorrhea, chlamydia, and herpes.

== History ==
The first case was detected on 20 May 2022 by a General Practitioner in Sydney. The patient, a male in his 40s, had recently returned from travelling in Europe and had developed symptoms. The man was placed in isolation while testing was carried out. Shortly afterward another male, in is 30s, who had recently returned from the United Kingdom to Victoria was diagnosed with the disease.

By 26 June 2022 there were six cases in New South Wales and four in Victoria.

By 30 June 2022 the first case of the virus was reported in South Australia, the man tested positive after returning from overseas and was placed in isolation.

Queensland reported the first case on 11 July 2022 with one person testing positive and being placed in isolation and under virtual monitoring in Brisbane.

On 24 July 2022 Australia had recorded a total of 44 cases, by 2 August the number of cases had increased to 53.

The first case was detected in Western Australia on 4 August 2022 in a person who had travelled from overseas. The person was placed in isolation in Perth, Western Australia.

On 5 August 2022 there had been 34 cases of mpox recorded in New South Wales and 57 cases had been recorded nationally.

By 11 August there were 70 confirmed and probable cases in Australia with 33 in New South Wales, 30 in Victoria, 2 in Queensland, 2 in Western Australia, 2 in the Australian Capital Territory and 1 in South Australia.

By 18 August there were 89 confirmed cases in Australia with 40 cases in Victoria, 39 in New South Wales, 3 in Queensland, 3 in Western Australia, 2 in both South Australia and the Australian Capital Territory.

There were 106 confirmed cases of mpox in Australia on the 25th of August with 52 recorded cases in Victoria, 43 cases in New South Wales, 4 in Western Australia, 3 in Queensland, 2 in South Australia and the Australian Capital Territory.

The Chief Medical Officer of Australia stood down the country's Communicable Disease Incident of National Significance declaration on 25 November 2022. At least 140 cases had been reported between May and late October 2022.

== See also ==
- 2022-2023 mpox outbreak
