= Mpox in the Philippines =

- Disease: Human mpox
- Pathogen: Monkeypox virus (MPV), clade II, 2017–2019 outbreak subclade
- Location: Philippines
- First reported: July 28, 2022 (Note: Date when the monkepox infection of the index case was confirmed through a positive test. The individual involved arrive in the country on July 19, 2022. The first case was announced publicly by the Department of Health on July 29, 2022. The patient was already tagged as recovered by the time of the announcement though still undergoing mandatory quarantine.)
- Confirmed cases: 911 (2024–May 2025)
- Deaths: 0

The Philippines was among the countries which reported cases during the 2022–2023 global outbreak of human mpox caused by the West African clade of the monkeypox virus. The outbreak was first reported in the Philippines when a suspected case was confirmed on July 28, 2022, according to the Department of Health.

== Background ==
Mpox (/ˈɛmpɒks/, EM-poks; originally known as monkeypox) is an infectious viral disease that can occur in humans and other animals. Symptoms include a rash that forms blisters and then crusts over, as well as fever and swollen lymph nodes. The illness is usually mild, and most infected individuals recover within a few weeks without treatment. The time from exposure to the onset of symptoms ranges from three to seventeen days, and symptoms typically last from two to four weeks. However, cases may be severe, especially in children, pregnant women, or people with suppressed immune systems.

The disease is caused by the monkeypox virus, a zoonotic virus in the genus Orthopoxvirus. The variola virus, which causes smallpox, is also in this genus. Human-to-human transmission can occur through direct contact with infected skin or body fluids, including sexual contact. People remain infectious from the onset of symptoms until all the lesions have scabbed and healed. The virus may spread from infected animals through handling infected meat or via bites or scratches. Diagnosis can be confirmed by polymerase chain reaction (PCR) testing a lesion for the virus's DNA.

Vaccination is recommended for those at high risk of infection. No vaccine has been developed specifically against mpox, but smallpox vaccines have been found to be effective. There is no specific treatment for the disease, so the aim of treatment is to manage the symptoms and prevent complications. Antiviral drugs such as tecovirimat can be used to treat mpox, although their effectiveness has not been proven.

As of May 2025, only the clade II strain which is milder than clade Ib has been detected in the Philippines.

== History ==
=== 2022 ===
==== Arrival ====
The first case of human mpox in the Philippines was confirmed on July 28, 2022. The case involved a 31-year-old Filipino national who arrived from abroad to the Philippines on July 19, 2022. He also had prior travel to countries with documented mpox cases. The individual's mpox infection was confirmed through a reverse transcription–polymerase chain reaction (RT-PCR) test at the Research Institute for Tropical Medicine in Muntinlupa which yielded a positive result on July 28, 2022. The patient had already recovered at the time of the health department's announcement but is undergoing isolation at home. Ten other people, including three people from the individual's household were identified as close contacts.

Earlier on July 23, 2022, Director-General Tedros Adhanom Ghebreyesus of the World Health Organization declared the mpox global outbreak a public health emergency of international concern.

On August 6, 2022, the patient was discharged after undergoing the 21-day quarantine isolation to which no other person was infected according to the Department of Health (DOH). Other close contacts tested negative too though they are still required to complete their 21 days of quarantine.

==== Further cases ====
On August 19, 2022, the DOH announced the detection of two more cases; those of a 34-year-old and a 29-year-old both of which had a history of travel abroad. The 34-year-old patient underwent home isolation and the 29-year-old patient was placed in isolation at a health facility. Contract tracing was conducted for both with the latter having 17 identified contacts. The PCR test conducted for both individuals returned positive results on August 18 and 19 respectively.

All three cases at that time were unrelated to each other as they entered the Philippines from different countries and the DOH considered these cases as "imported" cases. They exhibited typical symptoms associated with mpox like lesions on their faces and other parts of their bodies.

DOH Technical Advisory Group (TAG) member Dr. Edsel Salvana said he expected more cases to be detected but allayed concerns of a local transmission or the disease becoming endemic in the country. He pointed out that mpox is less contagious than COVID-19 and that protocols in place for the COVID-19 pandemic were also mitigating the spread of mpox.

On August 22, the DOH announced that the country had detected its fourth case, that of a 25-year-old Filipino with no travel history outside the country. The individual's PCR Test returned a positive result on August 19. The health department also stated that the fourth case was not related to the previous three. The following day the health department's Western Visayas regional office, released further details regarding the patient confined in a hospital; a male who works in Iloilo City and resides in Iloilo province. Iloilo City mayor Jerry Treñas in an interview with local radio stations said that the individual worked in a fast food chain in the city and added that he had a relative who recently came from abroad.

The DOH also asked the Western Visayas regional office to investigate the photos of the patient shared on social media as early as August 22 deeming such act as an unauthorized disclosure of private and confidential information.

The second case was deemed recovered on August 31 while the third case was considered the same on September 8. The fourth case was discharged from the hospital on September 15 and is deemed to have recovered.

=== 2023 ===
The Philippines would not record any further case of the human mpox. In May 2023, the public health emergency of the WHO was declared over. Meanwhile, the country's health department never declared a health emergency. There has been five more cases since then, bringing the total number of cases to nine. The last three cases were in December 2023.

=== 2024 ===
No cases of mpox would be reported for the earlier months of 2024. Meanwhile a new mpox epidemic is largely affecting Africa. The Department of Health (DOH) on August 19, 2024 announced that a positive case of mpox was reported to it the day prior. It was that of a 33-year old male in Metro Manila with no prior history of travelling overseas. The patient is later determined to have contracted the milder clade II variant, the same as the one from 2022–23. This case is the tenth overall since July 2022. Two more cases were confirmed in the metropolis on August 26.

On August 28, the DOH confirmed two more cases. One each in Metro Manila and Calabarzon. The next day, the health department's Central Visayas office disclosed there are five suspected mpox cases in the region.

September 1, 2024 saw more cases. Two in Metro Manila and one in Calabarzon.

By September 9, the number of active cases rose to 14, or 23 overall since July 2022. Mpox has been detected in three regions by around this time, with the DOH Cagayan Valley confirming the first case in the region in September 7. Two days later a new case was confirmed.

By September 16, there is now a total of 27 mpox cases since July 2022. Eighteen since August 2024; five of which have recovered. All eighteen cases have no determined epidemiological link.

=== 2025 ===
By May 2025, 911 cases has been reported in the Philippines since 2024. In the same month, Mindanao has faced a rise of mpox case with at least three regions reporting more than a dozen new cases.

== Related cases abroad ==
On September 5, 2022, the first ever case of mpox in Hong Kong was detected from a passenger who arrived from a flight from Manila. The individual concerned is a 30-year old Hong Konger.

== Response ==
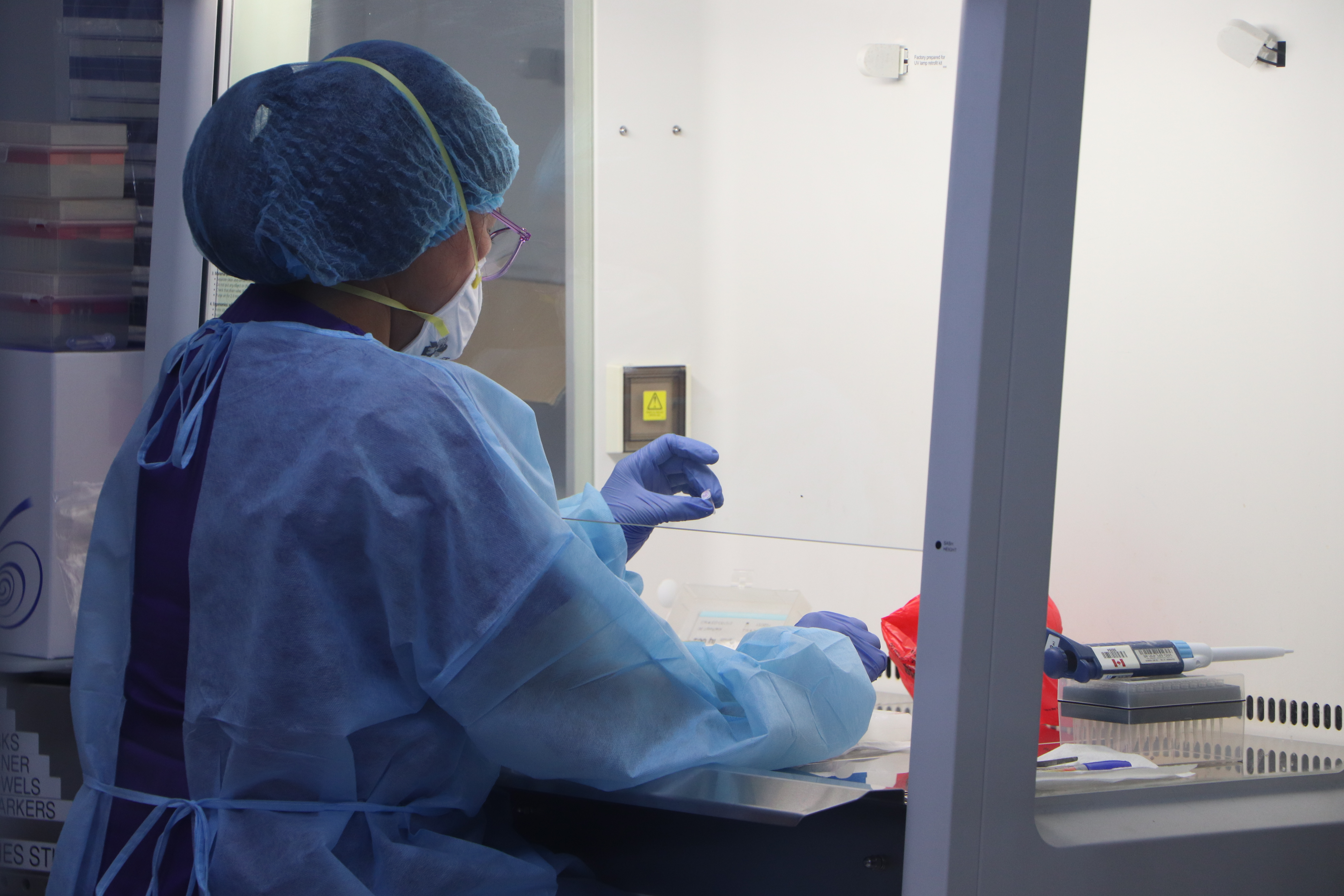
RITM Special Pathogens Laboratory staff prepares reagents during optimization of assay for mpox detection. June 2022

On May 24, 2022, the DOH expressed readiness to detect and contain mpox if it reaches the Philippines. It has classified mpox as a notifiable disease requiring health facilities in the country to report all patients under investigation and cases to its Epidemiology Bureau (EB) and Regional Epidemiology Surveillance Unit. It also announced that all suspected cases are to undergo reverse transcription–polymerase chain reaction (RT-PCR) tests for mpox.

By June 20, 2022, the Research Institute for Tropical Medicine in Muntinlupa announced that it has optimized its real-time polymerase chain reaction (PCR) assay for the detection of monkeypox virus.

As of July 2022, the RITM and the Philippine Genome Center in Quezon City are the only institutions in the Philippines capable of detecting mpox through RT-PCR tests. The DOH has aimed to expand capacity and capability to other institutional hospitals as well. Ninoy Aquino International Airport and several national airports ramped up their surveillance to detect the virus. In an explicit statement on August 2, 2022, DOH Officer in Charge Maria Rosario Vergeire said that borders and foreign entry are not to be shut down whilst not yet receiving recommendations from the World Health Organization (WHO). Furthermore, it was affirmed that the opening of classes and universities will still resume on August 22 accordingly along with the cooperation of DepEd and local LGUs.

The DOH has also entered negotiations with the United States government in a bid to secure mpox vaccines for a limited demographic. Along with the WHO, the DOH has been proactively monitoring cases and revamping medical facilities in the country.

Upon the detection of the first case, the Private Hospitals Association of the Philippines Inc. released a statement advising against home isolation for further suspected mpox cases.

== See also ==
- COVID-19 pandemic in the Philippines
