= 2022–2023 mpox outbreak in Singapore =

Disease outbreak in Singapore

- Disease: Human mpox
- Location: Singapore
- First reported: 21 June 2022
- Date: 21 June 2022 – ongoing (3 years, 10 months, and 28 days)
- Confirmed cases: 15

The 2022–2023 mpox outbreak in Singapore is a part of the global outbreak of human mpox caused by the West African clade of the monkeypox virus. According to the Ministry of Health (MOH), Singapore's first imported mpox case was reported on 20 June 2022. It was the first ever confirmed case in Southeast Asia.

== Background ==
Mpox (/ˈɛmpɒks/, EM-poks; originally known as monkeypox) is an infectious viral disease that can occur in humans and other animals. Symptoms include a rash that forms blisters and then crusts over, as well as fever and swollen lymph nodes. The illness is usually mild, and most infected individuals recover within a few weeks without treatment. The time from exposure to the onset of symptoms ranges from three to seventeen days, and symptoms typically last from two to four weeks. However, cases may be severe, especially in children, pregnant women, or people with suppressed immune systems.

The disease is caused by the monkeypox virus, a zoonotic virus in the genus Orthopoxvirus. The variola virus, which causes smallpox, is also in this genus. Human-to-human transmission can occur through direct contact with infected skin or body fluids, including sexual contact. People remain infectious from the onset of symptoms until all the lesions have scabbed and healed. The virus may spread from infected animals through handling infected meat or via bites or scratches. Diagnosis can be confirmed by polymerase chain reaction (PCR) testing a lesion for the virus's DNA.

Vaccination is recommended for those at high risk of infection. No vaccine has been developed specifically against mpox, but smallpox vaccines have been found to be effective. There is no specific treatment for the disease, so the aim of treatment is to manage the symptoms and prevent complications. Antiviral drugs such as tecovirimat can be used to treat mpox, although their effectiveness has not been proven.

== Arrival ==
The Ministry of Health (MOH) detailed that the patient is a 42-year-old British man who works as a flight attendant. He was reportedly in Singapore between 15 and 17 June 2022 and again on 19 June as he flew in and out of Singapore. He tested positive for mpox on 20 June.

On 6 July, it was confirmed that a 45-year-old Malaysian man tested positive becoming the first locally unlinked infection in the country.

== Situation ==
As of 5 August 2022, there are 10 locally transmitted cases and 5 imported cases in the country, all of whom are in stable conditions or ready to be discharged.
