= 2022–2026 mpox outbreak and pandemic in Taiwan =

Outbreak of mpox in Taiwan

- Disease: Human mpox
- Pathogen: Monkeypox virus (clades IIb and Ib)
- Location: Taiwan
- Arrival date: 24 June 2022 – ongoing (4 years, 2 months, and 3 days)
- Confirmed cases: 530
- Deaths: 1

The 2022–2026 mpox outbreak and pandemic in Taiwan is a part of the larger outbreak of human mpox caused by the West African clade of the monkeypox virus. According to the Centers for Disease Control, Taiwan's first mpox case was reported on 24 June 2022. Through July 2025, mpox cases in Taiwan were classified as clade IIb. The first clade Ib case of mpox in Taiwan was identified in May 2026.

== Background ==
Mpox (/ˈɛmpɒks/, EM-poks; originally known as monkeypox) is an infectious viral disease that can occur in humans and other animals. Symptoms include a rash that forms blisters and then crusts over, as well as fever and swollen lymph nodes. The illness is usually mild, and most infected individuals recover within a few weeks without treatment. The time from exposure to the onset of symptoms ranges from three to seventeen days, and symptoms typically last from two to four weeks. However, cases may be severe, especially in children, pregnant women, or people with suppressed immune systems.

The disease is caused by the monkeypox virus, a zoonotic virus in the genus Orthopoxvirus. The variola virus, which causes smallpox, is also in this genus. Human-to-human transmission can occur through direct contact with infected skin or body fluids, including sexual contact. People remain infectious from the onset of symptoms until all the lesions have scabbed and healed. The virus may spread from infected animals through handling infected meat or via bites or scratches. Diagnosis can be confirmed by polymerase chain reaction (PCR) testing a lesion for the virus's DNA.

Vaccination is recommended for those at high risk of infection. No vaccine has been developed specifically against mpox, but smallpox vaccines have been found to be effective. There is no specific treatment for the disease, so the aim of treatment is to manage the symptoms and prevent complications. Antiviral drugs such as tecovirimat can be used to treat mpox, although their effectiveness has not been proven.

An ongoing outbreak of mpox was confirmed on 6 May 2022, beginning with a British resident who, after travelling to Nigeria (where the disease is endemic), presented symptoms consistent with mpox on 29 April 2022. The resident returned to the United Kingdom on 4 May, creating the country's index case of the outbreak. The origin of several of the cases of mpox in the United Kingdom is unknown. Some monitors saw community transmission taking place in the London area as of mid-May, but it has been suggested that cases were already spreading in Europe in the previous months.

== Timeline ==
The first known case of the mpox outbreak in Taiwan was detected on 24 June 2022. According to the Centers for Disease Control, the case was a Taiwanese man in his 20s who had traveled to Germany for his studies. He returned to Taiwan on 16 June, started showing symptoms on 20 June, and tested positive for mpox on 24 June. On 12 July, Taiwan reported its second case of mpox in a man in his 30s who had gone on a business trip to the United States. On 6 August, a third case of imported mpox was reported, involving a man in his 20s who had returned to Taiwan from the United States. The fourth imported case, reported on 9 October, involved a man in his 40s who had visited Canada, and developed symptoms in the United States. The fifth case was reported on 15 February 2023. By March 2023, the disease was confirmed to have been domestically transmitted. In November 2023, the first death from mpox in Taiwan was reported.

In February 2024, Taiwan's Ministry of Health and Welfare formally changed the Mandarin name of the disease from monkeypox (猴痘) to mpox (M痘). This mirrored a change in the English-language name of the disease, originally proposed by the World Health Organization (WHO) on 28 November 2022. On 20 February, the Centers for Disease Control announced that Taiwan had avoided domestic transmission of mpox for fourteen consecutive weeks, thereby meeting the WHO criteria for the elimination of mpox from epidemic status. Subsequently, two men separately tested positive for mpox, and each was classified as a domestic case. Four additional mpox cases were reported in August 2024.

In July 2025, another set of four mpox cases were announced in unvaccinated males, each around thirty years of age. Three of the cases were domestic, and one was imported from China. From June 2022 through 14 July 2025, (after mpox had been declared a pandemic) a total of 473 cases had been reported in Taiwan. All cases up to that point had been identified as clade IIb. By 27 August 2025, 483 cases of mpox had been identified, with 451 classified as local and 32 as imported.

In May 2026, the first case of clade Ib mpox was recorded. Total mpox cases had risen to 530, split between 493 local cases and 37 imported cases. By August 2026, a total of nine clade Ib mpox had been identified in Taiwan, including the confirmation of the first two domestic cases of clade Ib mpox.

== Responses ==
In May 2022, the Taiwan Centers for Disease Control started increasing monitoring for mpox cases. Later that month, health minister Chen Shih-chung stated that Taiwan was not yet planning to purchase a mpox vaccine.

As the global outbreak spread, Taiwan designated mpox as a category 2 communicable disease on 23 June. Two days after the index case was publicized, the CDC issued guidelines for risk assessment and control. By 27 June, the CDC had begun working to reverse the vaccine policy declared in May, stating that talks to acquire mpox medications and vaccines had started. Later on 30 June, the CDC issued a travel warning for 44 countries that had reported cases of mpox. On 2 July, the CDC announced that they are planning to receive third-generation smallpox vaccines and antiviral drugs in late 2022. The CDC said that frontline medical workers and researchers will be the first to receive the vaccine. On 24 July, the CDC announced that they signed a contract to purchase medication to treat mpox patients, and that a shipment will arrive in August at the earliest. The CDC also announced that they are in talks to purchase mpox vaccines, and that they are hoping to receive them by late August. On 27 July, 504 courses of mpox medications arrived in Taiwan, to be used by severe cases and immunocompromised individuals. On 1 September, Taiwan received its first doses of the mpox vaccine.

In August 2024, the Centers for Disease Control issued Travel Health Notices for seven African countries.

== Statistics ==
Total cases and deaths

View source data.

New cases per day

View source data.
