= 2022–2023 mpox outbreak in the Republic of Ireland =

Disease outbreak in Ireland

2022 mpox outbreak in the Republic of Ireland
- Disease: Mpox
- Pathogen: Monkeypox virus (Clade II)
- Location: Ireland
- Arrival date: 27 May 2022 (3 years, 11 months, 2 weeks and 6 days ago).
- Date: As of 7 February 2024
- Confirmed cases: 244
- Hospitalised cases: 20 (total)
- Deaths: 0
- Fatality rate: 0%

Government website
- https://www.hpsc.ie/a-z/zoonotic/monkeypox/

The 2022-2023 mpox outbreak in the Republic of Ireland is part of the larger ongoing global outbreak of human mpox caused by Clade II of the monkeypox virus. The first case in the Republic was confirmed on 27 May 2022.

== Background ==
Mpox (/ˈɛmpɒks/, EM-poks; originally known as monkeypox) is an infectious viral disease that can occur in humans and other animals. Symptoms include a rash that forms blisters and then crusts over, as well as fever and swollen lymph nodes. The illness is usually mild, and most infected individuals recover within a few weeks without treatment. The time from exposure to the onset of symptoms ranges from three to seventeen days, and symptoms typically last from two to four weeks. However, cases may be severe, especially in children, pregnant women, or people with suppressed immune systems.

The disease is caused by the monkeypox virus, a zoonotic virus in the genus Orthopoxvirus. The variola virus, which causes smallpox, is also in this genus. Human-to-human transmission can occur through direct contact with infected skin or body fluids, including sexual contact. People remain infectious from the onset of symptoms until all the lesions have scabbed and healed. The virus may spread from infected animals through handling infected meat or via bites or scratches. Diagnosis can be confirmed by polymerase chain reaction (PCR) testing a lesion for the virus's DNA.

Vaccination is recommended for those at high risk of infection. No vaccine has been developed specifically against mpox, but smallpox vaccines have been found to be effective. There is no specific treatment for the disease, so the aim of treatment is to manage the symptoms and prevent complications. Antiviral drugs such as tecovirimat can be used to treat mpox, although their effectiveness has not been proven.

== Transmission ==
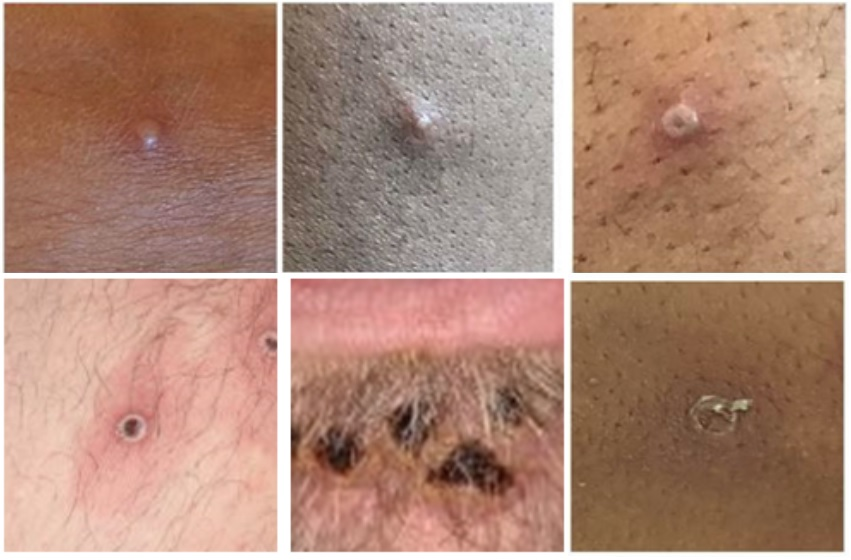
Stages of lesion development.

A large portion of those infected were believed to have not recently traveled to areas of Africa where mpox is normally found, such as Nigeria, the Democratic Republic of the Congo as well as central and western Africa. It is believed to be transmitted by close contact with sick people, with extra caution for those individuals with lesions on their skin or genitals, along with their bedding and clothing. The CDC has also stated that individuals should avoid contact and consumption of dead animals such as rats, squirrels, monkeys and apes along with wild game or lotions derived from animals in Africa.

In addition to more common symptoms, such as fever, headache, swollen lymph nodes, and rashes or lesions, some patients have also experienced proctitis, an inflammation of the rectum lining. CDC has also warned clinicians to not rule out mpox in patients with sexually transmitted infections since there have been reports of co-infections with syphilis, gonorrhea, chlamydia, and herpes.

== Statistics ==
As of 28 June 2023, the Health Protection Surveillance Centre (HPSC) had been notified of 228 cases of mpox, no deaths have been recorded so far.

Age profile of confirmed mpox cases as of 28 June 2023
Age	Cases
0–18	1
19–24	9
25–34	96
35–44	77
45–54	28
55–64	14
65+	3
Median age: 35; Mean age: 37;

Sex of confirmed mpox cases as of 28 June 2023
Gender	Number of cases (%)
Male	226(99.12%)
Female	2(0.88%)
Unknown	0(0%)
Total = 228

Sexual orientation of confirmed mpox cases as of 28 June 2023
Gender	Number of cases (%)
gbMSM	205(89.91%)
Other	3(1.32%)
Unknown	20(8.77%)
Total = 228

== See also ==
- Human mpox
- Monkeypox virus
- 2022–2023 mpox outbreak
