= Sex on premises venue =

Term in medical literature

Sex on premises venue (SOPV) is the term used primarily in British and Australian medical literature for the various commercial venues expressly for engaging in public sex, as opposed to spaces such as parks which may be used for sexual behavior but are intended for general public use.

A similar term, "on-premises club", is used by heterosexual swingers to describe a sex club in which non-commercial sexual activity takes place between clients or members.

While the term is primarily used with respect to men who have sex with men (MSM), at least one piece of legislation (the Sex Work Act in Victoria, Australia) uses "sex on premises venue" to mean "any venue where a person is required to pay an admission fee or charge to enter the venue for the purpose of engaging in sexual activities with another person who has also entered the venue on the same terms and who did not receive any form of payment or reward, whether directly or indirectly, for engaging in sexual activities". This wording excludes brothels.

== MSM sex-on-premises venues ==
Men who have sex with men (MSM) SOPVs include gay bathhouses, "backrooms", and "club" style venues that have no spa or sauna. Most gay bathhouses, bookstores, and bars in the United States do not openly advertise their actual sex-on-premises purpose or activity, as SOPVs elsewhere can.

"Backrooms" consisting of small cubicles with expensive-to-view video machines are usually attached to an adult bookstore. Sometimes there are glory holes between the cubicles. The cubicles are also referred to as private viewing rooms or cruise lounges. "Backrooms" of pubs or bars are usually darkened rooms with or without continuous (and free) pornographic films, but without any dividers or privacy, encouraging group sex.

Club style SOPVs are an entire venue and often consist of small cubicles, sometimes with no bed or mattress, unlike gay bathhouses which usually have some kind of comfort amenities in individual rooms.

Some bathhouses sell alcohol; pubs and bars sell alcohol but are prohibited from marketing themselves as SOPVs. Sometimes special events are held at pubs or bars that include sexual activity without causing the venue to be classified as an SOPV.

SOPVs are recognized by some city planners as part of the management strategy for sexually transmitted disease education and part of catering for a city's cultural diversity and tourist industry.

== See also ==
- Anonymous sex
