= 2022–2023 mpox outbreak in the Netherlands =

Disease outbreak in the Netherlands

- Disease: Human mpox
- Pathogen: Monkeypox virus (MPV), West African clade, 2017–2019 outbreak subclade
- Source: Travel from Nigeria (presumed/hypothesis)
- First outbreak: London, England (first outside West Africa)
- Arrival date: 4 May 2022 – ongoing (4 years and 13 days)
- Date: As of 30 August 2024
- Confirmed cases: 1,308
- Deaths: 0

The 2022–2023 mpox outbreak in the Netherlands is an ongoing global outbreak which has also spread in the Netherlands. The RIVM declared the disease an A-disease which makes it mandatory to report suspected cases to the GGD. The first human case of mpox in the Netherlands has been identified at the 21 May 2022. The outbreak does have a noticeable impact at the society, especially with people spreading misinformation related to the virus. The ongoing COVID-19 pandemic in the Netherlands has increased the fear among the community for a new pandemic like mpox.

== Background ==
Mpox (/ˈɛmpɒks/, EM-poks; originally known as monkeypox) is an infectious viral disease that can occur in humans and other animals. Symptoms include a rash that forms blisters and then crusts over, as well as fever and swollen lymph nodes. The illness is usually mild, and most infected individuals recover within a few weeks without treatment. The time from exposure to the onset of symptoms ranges from three to seventeen days, and symptoms typically last from two to four weeks. However, cases may be severe, especially in children, pregnant women, or people with suppressed immune systems.

The disease is caused by the monkeypox virus, a zoonotic virus in the genus Orthopoxvirus. The variola virus, which causes smallpox, is also in this genus. Human-to-human transmission can occur through direct contact with infected skin or body fluids, including sexual contact. People remain infectious from the onset of symptoms until all the lesions have scabbed and healed. The virus may spread from infected animals through handling infected meat or via bites or scratches. Diagnosis can be confirmed by polymerase chain reaction (PCR) testing a lesion for the virus's DNA.

Vaccination is recommended for those at high risk of infection. No vaccine has been developed specifically against mpox, but smallpox vaccines have been found to be effective. There is no specific treatment for the disease, so the aim of treatment is to manage the symptoms and prevent complications. Antiviral drugs such as tecovirimat can be used to treat mpox, although their effectiveness has not been proven.

An ongoing outbreak of mpox was confirmed on 6 May 2022, beginning with a British resident who, after travelling to Nigeria (where the disease is endemic), presented symptoms consistent with mpox on 29 April 2022. The resident returned to the United Kingdom on 4 May, creating the country's index case of the outbreak. The origin of several of the cases of mpox in the United Kingdom is unknown. Some monitors saw community transmission taking place in the London area as of mid-May, but it has been suggested that cases were already spreading in Europe in the previous months.

== Transmission ==
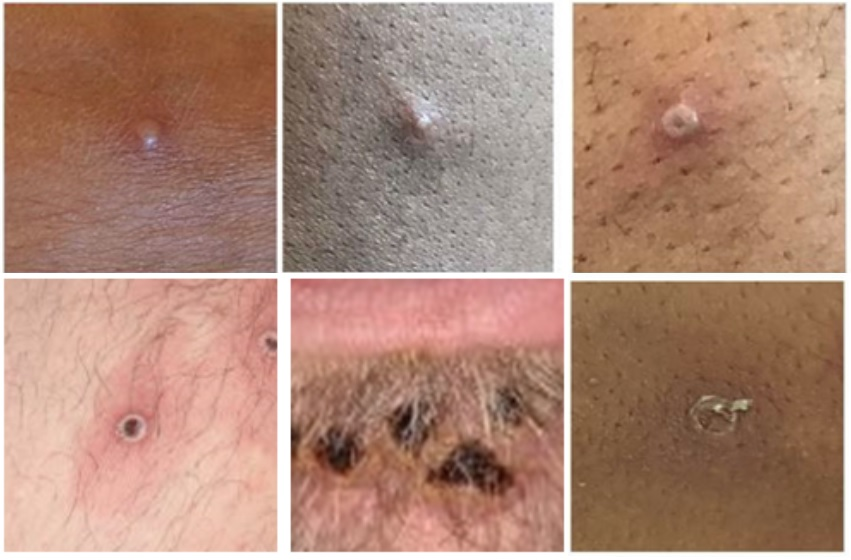
Stages of lesion development.

A large portion of those infected were believed to have not recently traveled to areas of Africa where mpox is normally found, such as Nigeria, the Democratic Republic of the Congo as well as central and western Africa. It is believed to be transmitted by close contact with sick people, with extra caution for those individuals with lesions on their skin or genitals, along with their bedding and clothing. The CDC has also stated that individuals should avoid contact and consumption of dead animals such as rats, squirrels, monkeys and apes along with wild game or lotions derived from animals in Africa.

In addition to more common symptoms, such as fever, headache, swollen lymph nodes, and rashes or lesions, some patients have also experienced proctitis, an inflammation of the rectum lining. CDC has also warned clinicians to not rule out mpox in patients with sexually transmitted infections since there have been reports of co-infections with syphilis, gonorrhea, chlamydia, and herpes.

== Statistics ==
As of 4 July 2022, there are 818 cases of the mpox virus in the Netherlands and zero deaths. The RIVM does update their mpox statistics two times per week, usually at Monday and Thursday.

== See also ==
- 2022–2023 mpox outbreak in Asia
- 2022–2023 mpox outbreak in Europe
- 2022–2023 mpox outbreak in Canada
- 2022–2023 mpox outbreak in Germany
- 2022–2023 mpox outbreak in Portugal
- 2022–2023 mpox outbreak in South Africa
- 2022–2023 mpox outbreak in Spain
- 2022–2023 mpox outbreak in the United Kingdom
- 2022–2023 mpox outbreak in the United States
- Mpox in Nigeria
- Mpox in the Democratic Republic of the Congo
