= 2022–2023 mpox outbreak in Spain =

2022–2023 outbreak of viral disease in Spain

- Disease: Mpox
- Pathogen: Monkeypox virus (West African clade)
- Location: Spain
- Index case: Madrid
- Arrival date: 18 May 2022 (4 years, 6 months and 3 days ago)
- Date: As of 30 August 2024
- Confirmed cases: 8,178 (Ministry of Health); 5,805 (Regional governments)
- Suspected cases: 0 (Regional governments)
- Hospitalized cases: 249 (Ministry of Health)
- Deaths: 3 (Ministry of Health)

Government website
- Monkeypox alert in Spain and other European countries (in Spanish)

The 2022–2023 mpox outbreak in Spain was a part of the outbreak of human mpox caused by the West African clade of the monkeypox virus. Spain was the second country outside the African countries with endemic mpox, to experience an outbreak in 2022. The outbreak was first reported in Spain on 18 May 2022.

== Background ==
Mpox, originally known as monkeypox, is an infectious viral disease that can occur in humans and other animals. Symptoms include a rash that forms blisters and then crusts over, as well as fever and swollen lymph nodes. The illness is usually mild, and most infected individuals recover within a few weeks without treatment. The time from exposure to the onset of symptoms ranges from three to seventeen days, and symptoms typically last from two to four weeks. However, cases may be severe, especially in children, pregnant women, or people with suppressed immune systems.

The disease is caused by the monkeypox virus, a zoonotic virus in the genus Orthopoxvirus. The variola virus, which causes smallpox, is also in this genus. Human-to-human transmission can occur through direct contact with infected skin or body fluids, including sexual contact. People remain infectious from the onset of symptoms until all the lesions have scabbed and healed. The virus may spread from infected animals through handling infected meat or via bites or scratches. Diagnosis can be confirmed by polymerase chain reaction (PCR) testing a lesion for the virus's DNA.

Vaccination is recommended for those at high risk of infection. No vaccine has been developed specifically against mpox, but smallpox vaccines have been found to be effective. There is no specific treatment for the disease, so the aim of treatment is to manage the symptoms and prevent complications. Antiviral drugs such as tecovirimat can be used to treat mpox, although their effectiveness has not been proven.

An ongoing outbreak of mpox was confirmed on 6 May 2022, beginning with a British resident who, after travelling to Nigeria (where the disease is endemic), presented symptoms consistent with mpox on 29 April 2022. The resident returned to the United Kingdom on 4 May, creating the country's index case of the outbreak. The origin of several of the cases of mpox in the United Kingdom is unknown. Some monitors saw community transmission taking place in the London area as of mid-May, but it has been suggested that cases were already spreading in Europe in the previous months.

== Transmission ==
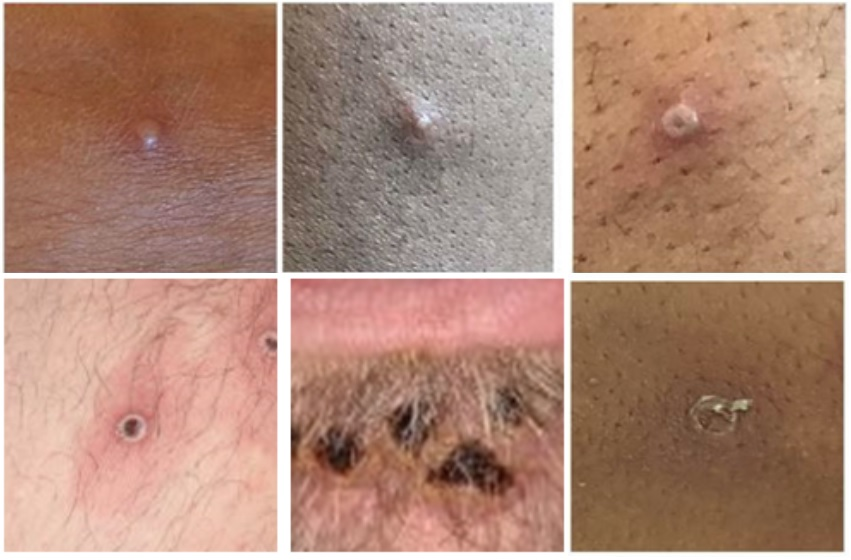
Stages of lesion development.

A large portion of those infected were believed to have not recently traveled to areas of Africa where mpox is normally found, such as Nigeria, the Democratic Republic of the Congo as well as central and western Africa. It is believed to be transmitted by close contact with sick people, with extra caution for those individuals with lesions on their skin or genitals, along with their bedding and clothing. The CDC has also stated that individuals should avoid contact and consumption of dead animals such as rats, squirrels, monkeys and apes along with wild game or lotions derived from animals in Africa.

In addition to more common symptoms, such as fever, headache, swollen lymph nodes, and rashes or lesions, some patients have also experienced proctitis, an inflammation of the rectum lining. CDC has also warned clinicians to not rule out mpox in patients with sexually transmitted infections since there have been reports of co-infections with syphilis, gonorrhea, chlamydia, and herpes.

== History ==
On 18 May 2022, the Community of Madrid regional government reported the first eight suspected cases of mpox, and seven of them were confirmed by the Ministry of Health on 20 May.

On 20 May, the health authorities of Madrid closed the gay sauna Paraíso, which was under investigation as a possible high transmission point in Madrid. The sauna reopened again on 9 June after receiving an authorization from the regional health department.

== Outbreak characteristics ==
According to the Community of Madrid regional government on 6 June 2022, all cases in the region were men, except one woman who is cohabitant with one of the infected men. The most likely contagion event for most was sexual relations with strangers, usually at parties in private residences, a sauna, or the gay pride event at Maspalomas, Canary Islands. 48% of cases were also HIV-positive.

On 10 June, the Ministry of Health disclosed that out of a sample of 78 cases, 21 had a previous smallpox vaccine dose.

On 26 August, the Ministry of Health published additional data about 6,459 cases. 6,334 of them were men, and 125 were women. Age ranged between 7 months and 88 years, with a median age of 37 years. Out of 5,198 cases with recorded data, 5,022 were men who have sex with men. Out of 3,700 cases with recorded data, 92,6% had prolonged intimate contact during sexual relation as the most likely transmission mechanism.

== LGBT stigmatization ==
Several experts have raised concerns about stigmatization of LGBT people in connection to the mpox outbreak.

In June 2022, the public prosecutor of Valencia opened an investigation of a publication about the mpox outbreak by the far-right political party España 2000, which could constitute hate speech against the LGBT community.

== Cases per region ==
Mpox cases in Spain per autonomous community
| Community | Confirmed | Suspected | As of | Ref. |
|---|---|---|---|---|
| Andalusia | 685 | 96 | 12 August 2022 | |
| Aragon | 53 | — | 12 August 2022 | |
| Asturias | 53 | — | 12 August 2022 | |
| Balearic Islands | 134 | — | 12 August 2022 | |
| Canary Islands | 136 | — | 12 August 2022 | |
| Cantabria | 27 | — | 12 August 2022 | |
| Castilla–La Mancha | 42 | — | 12 August 2022 | |
| Castile and León | 54 | — | 12 August 2022 | |
| Catalonia | 1,782 | — | 12 August 2022 | |
| Ceuta | — | — | 12 August 2022 | |
| Valencian Community | 353 | — | 12 August 2022 | |
| Extremadura | 22 | — | 12 August 2022 | |
| (Galicia (Spain)) Galicia | 83 | — | 12 August 2022 | |
| Community of Madrid | 2,169 | — | 12 August 2022 | |
| Melilla | — | — | 12 August 2022 | |
| (Region of Murcia) Murcia | 33 | — | 12 August 2022 | |
| Navarre | 13 | — | 12 August 2022 | |
| (Basque Country (autonomous community)) Basque Country | 162 | — | 12 August 2022 | |
| La Rioja | 4 | — | 12 August 2022 | |
| Total | 5,805 | 96 | | |

== See also ==
- 2022–2023 mpox outbreak
- 2022–2023 mpox outbreak in Canada
- Timeline of the 2022–2023 mpox outbreak
