= 2022–2023 mpox outbreak in the United Kingdom =

Ongoing viral outbreak

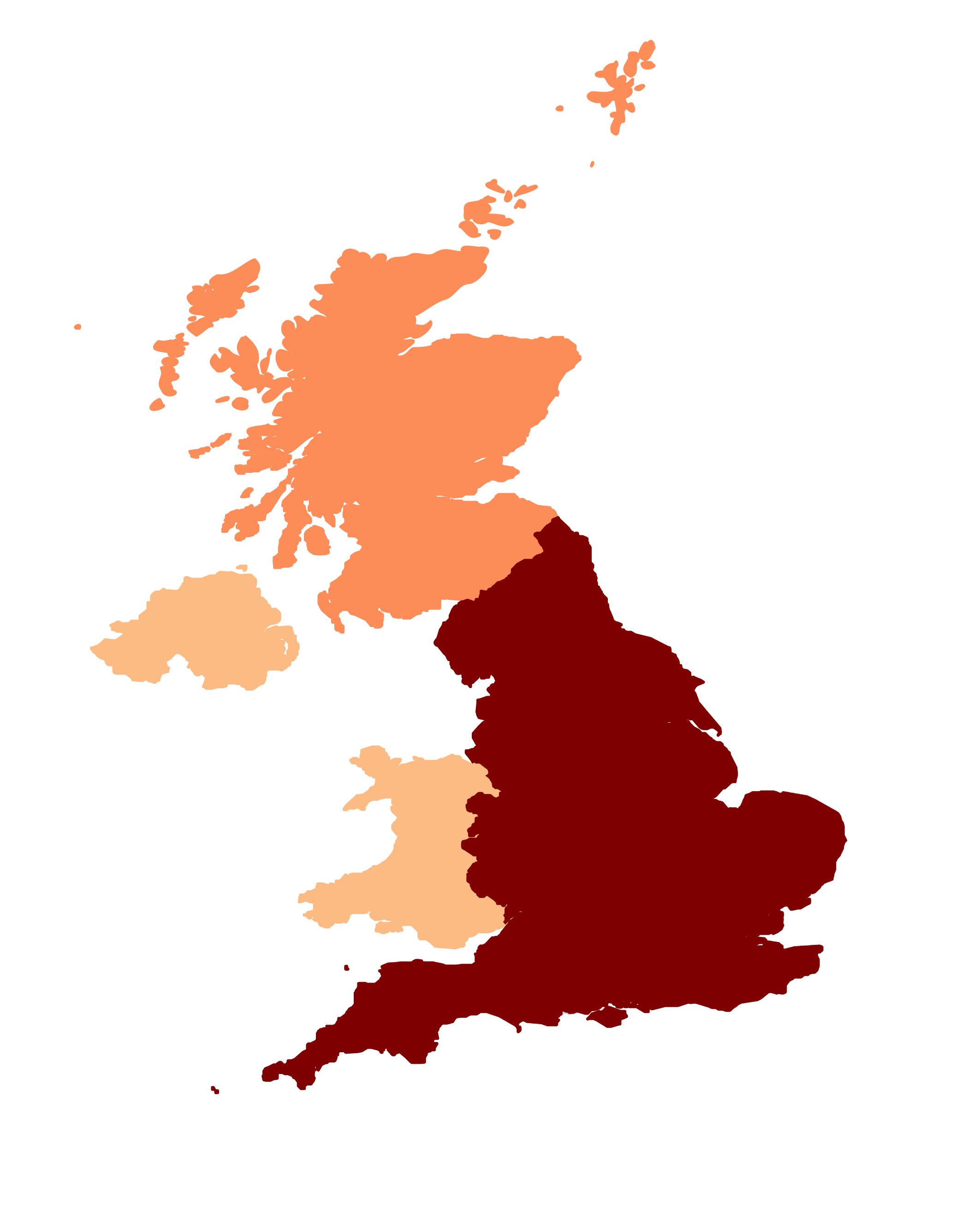
- Confirmed cases by countries in the United Kingdom during the 2022 outbreak (as of 12 July) 101–1,660 26–100 1–25
- Disease: Mpox
- Pathogen: Monkeypox virus (West African clade)
- Location: United Kingdom
- Index case: London
- Arrival date: 6 May 2022 (4 years, 1 month and 2 days ago)
- Date: As of 29 August 2022
- Confirmed cases: 3,279 (and 134 highly probable cases)
- Deaths: 0

Government website
- UK Government

The 2022–2023 mpox outbreak in the United Kingdom was part of the larger outbreak of human mpox caused by the West African clade (type) of the monkeypox virus. The United Kingdom was the first country, outside of the endemic African areas, to experience an outbreak. As of 22 July 2022, there were 2,208 confirmed cases in the United Kingdom, with 2,115 in England, 54 in Scotland, 24 in Wales, and 15 in Northern Ireland.

== Background ==
Mpox (/ˈɛmpɒks/, EM-poks; originally known as monkeypox) is an infectious viral disease that can occur in humans and other animals. Symptoms include a rash that forms blisters and then crusts over, as well as fever and swollen lymph nodes. The illness is usually mild, and most infected individuals recover within a few weeks without treatment. The time from exposure to the onset of symptoms ranges from three to seventeen days, and symptoms typically last from two to four weeks. However, cases may be severe, especially in children, pregnant women, or people with suppressed immune systems.

The disease is caused by the monkeypox virus, a zoonotic virus in the genus Orthopoxvirus. The variola virus, which causes smallpox, is also in this genus. Human-to-human transmission can occur through direct contact with infected skin or body fluids, including sexual contact. People remain infectious from the onset of symptoms until all the lesions have scabbed and healed. The virus may spread from infected animals through handling infected meat or via bites or scratches. Diagnosis can be confirmed by polymerase chain reaction (PCR) testing a lesion for the virus's DNA.

Vaccination is recommended for those at high risk of infection. No vaccine has been developed specifically against mpox, but smallpox vaccines have been found to be effective. There is no specific treatment for the disease, so the aim of treatment is to manage the symptoms and prevent complications. Antiviral drugs such as tecovirimat can be used to treat mpox, although their effectiveness has not been proven.

An ongoing outbreak of mpox was confirmed on 6 May 2022, beginning with a British resident who, after travelling to Nigeria (where the disease is endemic), presented symptoms consistent with mpox on 29 April 2022. The resident returned to the United Kingdom on 4 May, creating the country's index case of the outbreak. The origin of several of the cases of mpox in the United Kingdom is unknown. Some monitors saw community transmission taking place in the London area as of mid-May, but it has been suggested that cases were already spreading in Europe in the previous months.

== Transmission ==
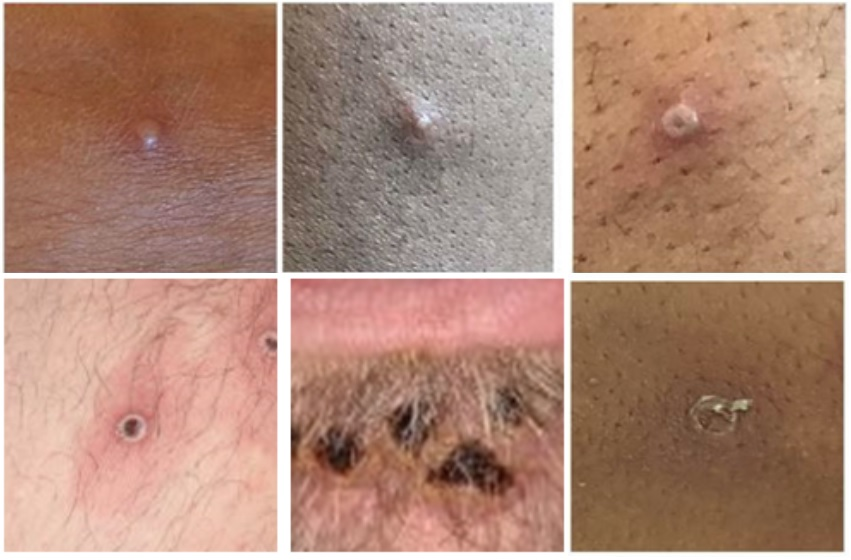
Stages of lesion development.

A large portion of those infected were believed to have not recently traveled to areas of Africa where mpox is normally found, such as Nigeria, the Democratic Republic of the Congo as well as central and western Africa. It is believed to be transmitted by close contact with sick people, with extra caution for those individuals with lesions on their skin or genitals, along with their bedding and clothing. The CDC has also stated that individuals should avoid contact and consumption of dead animals such as rats, squirrels, monkeys and apes along with wild game or lotions derived from animals in Africa.

In addition to more common symptoms, such as fever, headache, swollen lymph nodes, and rashes or lesions, some patients have also experienced proctitis, an inflammation of the rectum lining. CDC has also warned clinicians to not rule out mpox in patients with sexually transmitted infections since there have been reports of co-infections with syphilis, gonorrhea, chlamydia, and herpes.

== History ==
The first known case was detected in the beginning of May 2022, in a British resident who had travelled to Lagos and Delta State in Nigeria, in areas where mpox is considered to be an endemic disease. The person developed a rash on 29 April while in Nigeria and flew back to the United Kingdom, arriving on 4 May, and presented to hospital later the same day. Mpox infection was immediately suspected, and the patient was hospitalised at Guy's Hospital and isolated, then tested positive for the virus on 6 May.

In late May, cases started to be reported in the other constituent countries, with Public Health Scotland reporting its first case on 23 May. Public Health Wales and the Public Health Agency of Northern Ireland each reported one case on 26 May.

On 1 June, a case was reported in Gibraltar, a British Overseas Territory.

On 30 August 2022, 3413 cumulative cases (3,279 confirmed and 134 highly probable cases) of human mpox up to (and including) 29 August were reported for the UK.

=== UK cumulative and weekly cases ===
View source data.
- (*) total cases = confirmed and highly probable cases
- cases up to and including day d (Monday) are reported and hence ref. the next day
- Ref: (common access date 19 February 2023)
  - June 21st, 24th, 28th
  - July 1st, 5th, 8th, 12th, 15th, 19th, 22nd, 26th
  - August 2nd, 9th, 16th, 23rd, 30th
  - September 6th, 13th, 20th, 27th
  - October 4th, 11th, 18th, 25th
  - November 1st, 8th, 15th, 22nd, 29th
  - December 6th, 13th, 20th

== Responses ==
On 22 May, Education Secretary Nadhim Zahawi said "we're taking it very, very seriously" and that the UK government had already started purchasing smallpox vaccines.

The UK Health Security Agency (UKHSA) advised people who have had close contact with a person infected with mpox to self-isolate for 21 days. Self-isolation is not mandatory.

Furthermore, to combat the continued spread of the outbreak, the UKHSA has offered doses of the Imvanex smallpox vaccine, also effective against mpox, to people having had close contact with people confirmed to having been infected.

On 30 May, the four main public health agencies published a consensus statement describing the principles they will put in use, with the aim of limiting community transmission.

== Number of cases confirmed in constituent countries ==
Cases of mpox
Constituent country	Case(s)
Northern Ireland	15
Scotland	54
Wales	24
England	2,115
Total	2,208

== See also ==
- 2022–2023 mpox outbreak in Canada
- 2022–2023 mpox outbreak in Europe
- 2022–2023 mpox outbreak in the United States
