= 2022–2023 mpox outbreak in India =

Ongoing outbreak of mpox in India

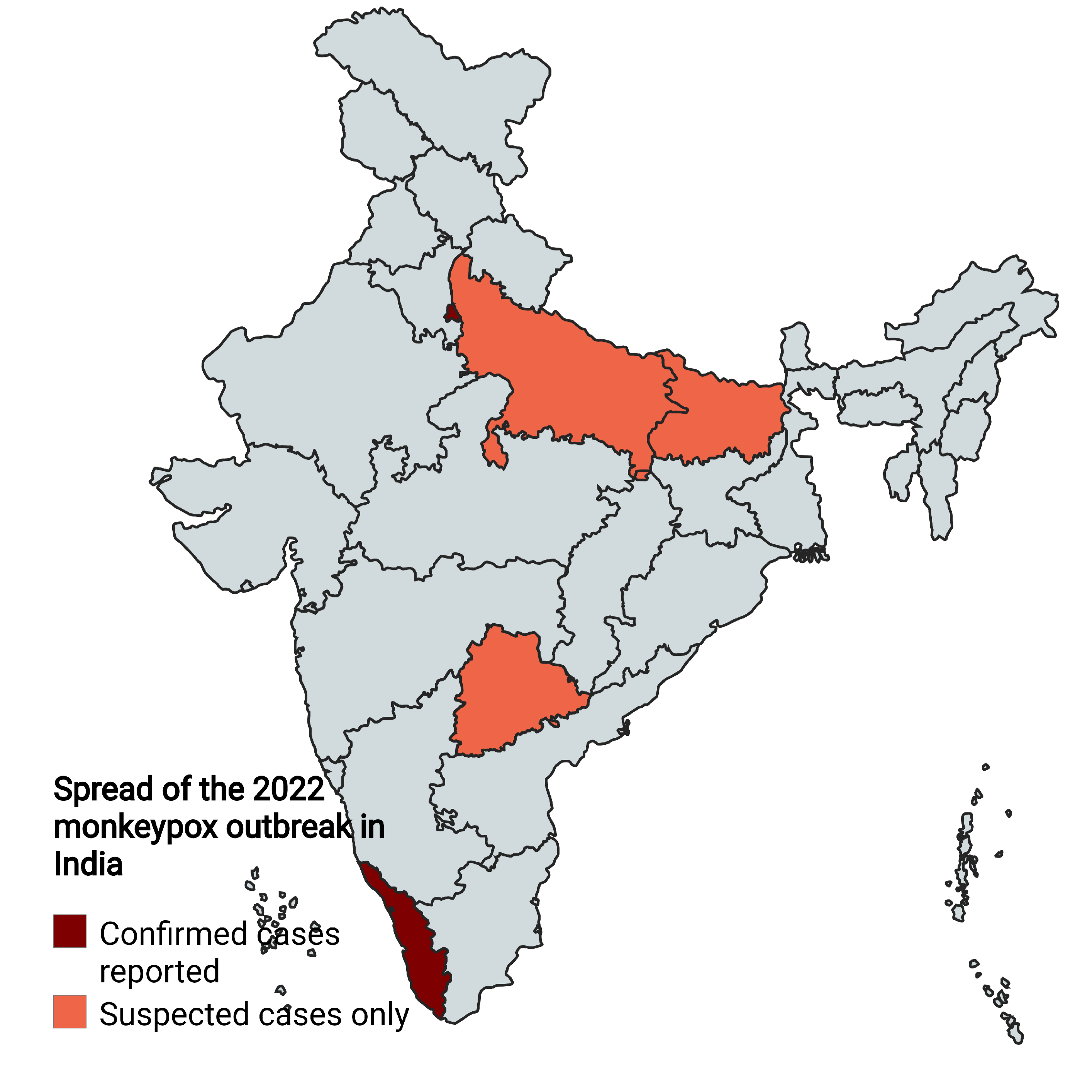
- Disease: Mpox
- Pathogen: Monkeypox virus (West African clade)
- Location: India
- Index case: Kollam, Kerala (First landed and hospitalized in Thiruvananthapuram, infected in the United Arab Emirates)
- Date: 14 July 2022 – ongoing (4 years, 3 months, 4 weeks and 1 day ago)
- Confirmed cases: 23
- Suspected cases: 0
- Deaths: 1

The 2022–2023 mpox outbreak in India is a part of the ongoing outbreak of human mpox caused by the West African clade of the monkeypox virus. The outbreak was first reported in India on 14 July 2022 when Kerala's State Health Minister Veena George announced a suspected imported case which was confirmed hours later by the NIV. India was the tenth country to report a mpox case in Asia and the first in South Asia. Currently, India has reported more than 30 cases of mpox.

On 24 July, the first locally transmitted case was reported in Delhi. The individual, a middle-aged male who had no recent history of travelling abroad, was isolated in the Lok Nayak Hospital, New Delhi.

== Background ==
Mpox, originally known as monkeypox, is an infectious viral disease that can occur in humans and other animals. Symptoms include a rash that forms blisters and then crusts over, as well as fever and swollen lymph nodes. The illness is usually mild, and most infected individuals recover within a few weeks without treatment. The time from exposure to the onset of symptoms ranges from three to seventeen days, and symptoms typically last from two to four weeks. However, cases may be severe, especially in children, pregnant women, or people with suppressed immune systems.

The disease is caused by the monkeypox virus, a zoonotic virus in the genus Orthopoxvirus. The variola virus, which causes smallpox, is also in this genus. Human-to-human transmission can occur through direct contact with infected skin or body fluids, including sexual contact. People remain infectious from the onset of symptoms until all the lesions have scabbed and healed. The virus may spread from infected animals through handling infected meat or via bites or scratches. Diagnosis can be confirmed by polymerase chain reaction (PCR) testing a lesion for the virus's DNA.

Vaccination is recommended for those at high risk of infection. No vaccine has been developed specifically against mpox, but smallpox vaccines have been found to be effective. There is no specific treatment for the disease, so the aim of treatment is to manage the symptoms and prevent complications. Antiviral drugs such as tecovirimat can be used to treat mpox, although their effectiveness has not been proven.

In May 2022, the World Health Organization (WHO) made an emergency announcement of the existence of a multi-country outbreak of mpox, a viral disease then commonly known as "monkeypox". The initial cluster of cases was found in the United Kingdom, where the first case was detected in London on 6 May 2022 in a patient with a recent travel history from Nigeria where the disease has been endemic. On 16 May, the UK Health Security Agency (UKHSA) confirmed four new cases with no link to travel to a country where mpox is endemic. Subsequently, cases have been reported from many countries and regions. The outbreak marked the first time mpox had spread widely outside Central and West Africa. The disease had been circulating and evolving in human hosts over several years before the outbreak and was caused by the clade IIb variant of the virus.

On 23 July 2022, the director-general of the WHO, Tedros Adhanom Ghebreyesus, declared the outbreak a public health emergency of international concern (PHEIC), stating that "we have an outbreak that has spread around the world rapidly, through new modes of transmission, about which we understand too little". A global response to the outbreak included public awareness campaigns in order to reduce spread of the disease, and repurposing of smallpox vaccines.

== Transmission ==
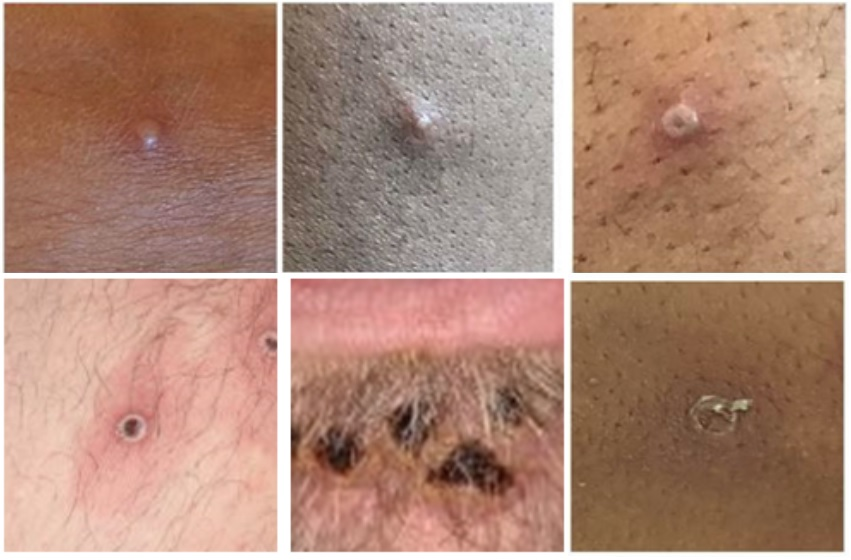
Stages of lesion development.

A large portion of those infected were believed to have not recently traveled to areas of Africa where mpox is normally found, such as Nigeria, the Democratic Republic of the Congo as well as central and western Africa. It is believed to be transmitted by close contact with sick people, with extra caution for those individuals with lesions on their skin or genitals, along with their bedding and clothing. The CDC has also stated that individuals should avoid contact and consumption of dead animals such as rats, squirrels, monkeys and apes along with wild game or lotions derived from animals in Africa.

In addition to more common symptoms, such as fever, headache, swollen lymph nodes, and rashes or lesions, some patients have also experienced proctitis, an inflammation of the rectum lining. CDC has also warned clinicians to not rule out mpox in patients with sexually transmitted infections since there have been reports of co-infections with syphilis, gonorrhea, chlamydia, and herpes.

== History ==
=== Arrival ===
On 14 July, a suspected mpox case was reported in the South-Indian state of Kerala by the State health minister Veena George. The patient was reportedly in close contact with a person who tested positive for mpox abroad in the United Arab Emirates, and arrived in India from UAE four days prior to the announcement.

Hours later, minister Veena George announced that the patient was confirmed to be infected with the mpox disease by the NIV of Pune.

=== Spread ===
No community transmission or locally transmitted cases were detected in India until on 24 July, Delhi reported their first case, and the patient had no history of travel from abroad. He recently attended a party in Himachal Pradesh. Although community transmission of the disease in India wasn't confirmed by the government health officials.

== Timeline ==
Mpox cases in India Deaths Confirmed cases
Date	Cases (rise)	Deaths (rise)
2022-07-14
2022-07-15
2022-07-16
2022-07-17
2022-07-18
2022-07-19
2022-07-20
2022-07-21
2022-07-22
2022-07-23
2022-07-24

=== July 2022 ===
14 July: A suspected mpox case was reported in Kerala. State health minister Veena George said that the patient was in close contact with a person who tested positive for mpox. The patient arrived in India from the United Arab Emirates four days earlier, according to the health minister, and was admitted to a hospital in the state after the patient showed symptoms, and samples were sent to the National Institute of Virology (NIV). It was also reported that tests in local hospitals confirmed that the individual was affected with disease, but still samples were sent to the NIV for confirmation, as per the guideline given by the central government.

31 July: A 22-year-old man who had been in the United Arab Emirates came back to India. During his stay in the UAE, he had been in contact with another man who also tested positive for the virus. He then tested positive for mpox in the UAE but left the country following the test, he then arrived in his home-district in Thrissur, Kerala on 22 July. At first, he didn't have much symptoms with others in contact with him saying he was actively playing 'football' and other daily activities. On 26 July, he was admitted to a hospital with a fever and the authorities announced a suspected case. On 31 July, he died in the hospital of an unknown cause. It was then reported he died of mpox.

== Responses ==
=== Central government ===
After the outbreak was highlighted on mid-May, Union Health Minister Mansukh Mandaviya directed the National Centre for Disease Control (NCDC) and the Indian Council of Medical Research (ICMR) to keep a close watch and monitor the situation. The Union Health Ministry has also directed airport and other port health officers to be vigilant and have been instructed to isolate and send samples to the National Institute of Virology (NIV) in Pune of any sick passenger with a travel history to infected countries.

=== State and Union territory governments ===
- Karnataka: Following the directions of the Union Health Ministry, Karnataka state government directed officials to set up mpox surveilience and set up a two-bed isolation ward in every district hospital to isolate suspected or confirmed cases.
- Madhya Pradesh: The state health department issued an advisory about pox-related diseases (especially Smallpox and Mpox) on early June. Health Commissioner-and-Secretary Sudam Khade directed all district Chief Medical and Health Officers (CMHOs) to take necessary steps as per the advisory when needed.
- West Bengal: The West Bengal state government issued an advisory on June. In the advisory, the State Health Department asked hospitals in the state to set up separate facilities to accommodate patients coming from abroad with symptoms and collect and sent samples of suspected patients to the NIV.
- Uttar Pradesh: On June, Uttar Pradesh Chief Medical Officer issued an advisory for and District Magistrates and other higher health officials of the state to remain alert. The advisory directed that information on patients with fever and rashes to be shared with the office of the CMO.

== Cases and statistics ==
State/Union Territory	District	Confirmed Cases	Suspected Cases	Total Cases	References
Bihar	Patna	—	1	1	
Bihar	Nalanda	—	1	1	
Bihar	State Total	—	2	2	
Delhi	New Delhi	—	1	1	
Delhi	West Delhi	1	—	1	
Delhi	UT Total	1	1	2	
Kerala	Kannur	1	—	1	
Kerala	Kollam	1	—	1	
Kerala	Malappuram	2	—	1	
Kerala	State Total	4	—	3	
Telangana	Khammam	—	1	1	
Telangana	State Total	—	1	10	
Uttar Pradesh	Auraiya	—	1	1	
Uttar Pradesh	Ghaziabad	—	2	2	
Uttar Pradesh	Gautam Buddha Nagar	—	1	1	
Uttar Pradesh	State Total	—	4	4	
India		4	8	12	—

== See also ==
- 2022–2023 mpox outbreak
- Timeline of the 2022–2023 mpox outbreak
- 2022–2023 mpox outbreak in Asia
  - 2022–2023 mpox outbreak in Israel
  - 2022–2023 mpox outbreak in Japan
- 2022–2023 mpox outbreak in Europe
  - 2022–2023 mpox outbreak in France
  - 2022–2023 mpox outbreak in Germany
  - 2022–2023 mpox outbreak in the Netherlands
  - 2022–2023 mpox outbreak in Portugal
  - 2022–2023 mpox outbreak in Spain
  - 2022–2023 mpox outbreak in the United Kingdom
- 2022–2023 mpox outbreak in Canada
- 2022–2023 mpox outbreak in Brazil
- 2022–2023 mpox outbreak in Peru
- 2022–2023 mpox outbreak in South Africa
- 2022–2023 mpox outbreak in the United States
- Mpox in Nigeria
- Mpox in the Democratic Republic of the Congo
- COVID-19 pandemic in India
