= 2022–2023 mpox outbreak in Canada =

Ongoing viral outbreak

- Spread of disease as of September 2, 2022
- Disease: Mpox
- Pathogen: Monkeypox virus (West African clade)
- Location: Canada
- Index case: Montreal, Quebec (first suspected May 12, 2022)
- Arrival date: May 19, 2022 (4 years, 1 week and 6 days ago)
- Confirmed cases: 1,460
- Hospitalized cases: 44
- Deaths: 0

Government website
- Government of Canada

The 2022–2023 mpox outbreak in Canada is a part of the outbreak of human mpox caused by the West African clade of the monkeypox virus. The outbreak started in Canada on May 19, 2022, with the country since then becoming one of the most affected in the Americas.

== Background ==
Mpox (/ˈɛmpɒks/, EM-poks; originally known as monkeypox) is an infectious viral disease that can occur in humans and other animals. Symptoms include a rash that forms blisters and then crusts over, as well as fever and swollen lymph nodes. The illness is usually mild, and most infected individuals recover within a few weeks without treatment. The time from exposure to the onset of symptoms ranges from three to seventeen days, and symptoms typically last from two to four weeks. However, cases may be severe, especially in children, pregnant women, or people with suppressed immune systems.

The disease is caused by the monkeypox virus, a zoonotic virus in the genus Orthopoxvirus. The variola virus, which causes smallpox, is also in this genus. Human-to-human transmission can occur through direct contact with infected skin or body fluids, including sexual contact. People remain infectious from the onset of symptoms until all the lesions have scabbed and healed. The virus may spread from infected animals through handling infected meat or via bites or scratches. Diagnosis can be confirmed by polymerase chain reaction (PCR) testing a lesion for the virus's DNA.

Vaccination is recommended for those at high risk of infection. No vaccine has been developed specifically against mpox, but smallpox vaccines have been found to be effective. There is no specific treatment for the disease, so the aim of treatment is to manage the symptoms and prevent complications. Antiviral drugs such as tecovirimat can be used to treat mpox, although their effectiveness has not been proven.

An ongoing outbreak of mpox was confirmed on May 6, 2022, beginning with a British resident who, after travelling to Nigeria (where the disease is endemic), presented symptoms consistent with mpox on April 29, 2022. The resident returned to the United Kingdom on May 4, creating the country's index case of the outbreak. The origin of several of the cases of mpox in the United Kingdom is unknown. Some monitors saw community transmission taking place in the London area as of mid-May, but it has been suggested that cases were already spreading in Europe in the previous months.

== Transmission ==
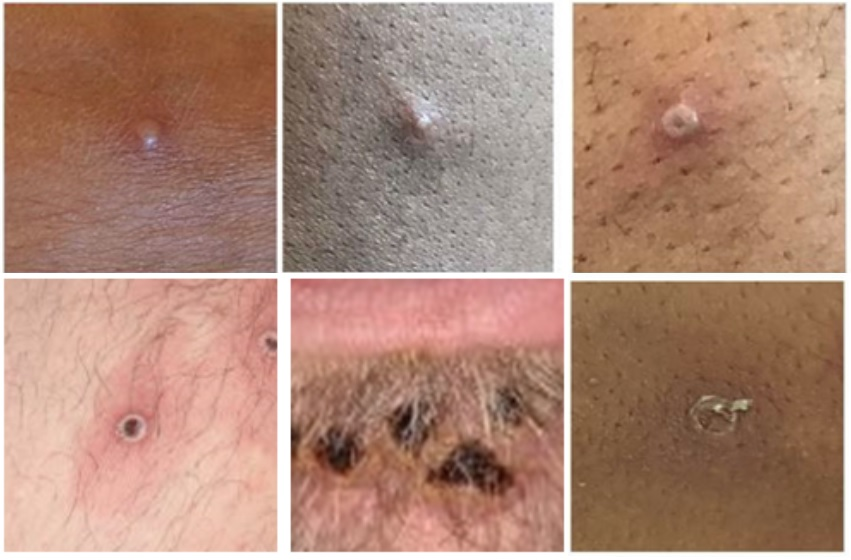
Stages of lesion development.

A large portion of those infected were believed to have not recently traveled to areas of Africa where mpox is normally found, such as Nigeria, the Democratic Republic of the Congo as well as central and western Africa. It is believed to be transmitted by close contact with sick people, with extra caution for those individuals with lesions on their skin or genitals, along with their bedding and clothing. The CDC has also stated that individuals should avoid contact and consumption of dead animals such as rats, squirrels, monkeys and apes along with wild game or lotions derived from animals in Africa.

Symptoms such as fever, headache, swollen lymph nodes, and rashes or lesions are fairly common. Additionally some patients also have presented with proctitis. The Public Health Agency of Canada has noted that person to person transmission of mpox is possible from direct contact with bodily fluids including sexual contact.

== History ==
On May 18, the United States confirmed its first 2022 case of mpox and Canada reported 13 suspected cases. On May 19, the first confirmed case of mpox was reported in Toronto. On May 27, 500 people in Montreal, Quebec, received smallpox vaccinations. By July 6, 800 Montrealers had lined up at the clinic in the center of the Gay Village that was offering the initial vaccination.

== Number of cases confirmed in the Canadian provinces ==
Canada currently has the 8th most mpox cases.

Cases of mpox
Province or territory	Cases
Nova Scotia	1
New Brunswick	1
Manitoba	1
Yukon	2
Saskatchewan	6
Alberta	43
British Columbia	190
Quebec	525
Ontario	691
Total cases	1,460
As of March 3, 2022, at 12:00 PM EDT

== Responses ==
This was the first time in history that mpox was in Canada.

== See also ==
- 2022–2023 mpox outbreak
- Timeline of the 2022–2023 mpox outbreak
  - 2022–2023 mpox outbreak in Asia
  - 2022–2023 mpox outbreak in Brazil
    - 2022–2023 mpox outbreak in India
    - 2022–2023 mpox outbreak in Israel
    - 2022–2023 mpox outbreak in Japan
    - 2022–2023 mpox outbreak in South Africa
  - 2022–2023 mpox outbreak in Europe
    - 2022–2023 mpox outbreak in France
    - 2022–2023 mpox outbreak in Germany
    - 2022–2023 mpox outbreak in the Netherlands
    - 2022–2023 mpox outbreak in Portugal
    - 2022–2023 mpox outbreak in Spain
    - 2022–2023 mpox outbreak in the United Kingdom
    - 2022–2023 mpox outbreak in the United States
    - 2022–2023 mpox outbreak in Peru
- Mpox in Nigeria
- Mpox in the Democratic Republic of the Congo
