= 2022–2023 mpox outbreak in Europe =

Ongoing outbreak of monkeypox in Europe

- Disease: Mpox
- Pathogen: Monkeypox virus (West African clade)
- Index case: London, England
- Arrival date: 6 May 2022 (4 years, 4 months, 3 weeks and 3 days ago)
- Confirmed cases: 22,640
- Suspected cases: 82
- Deaths: 1
- Territories: 35

The 2022–2023 mpox outbreak in Europe is a part of the outbreak of human mpox caused by the West African clade of the monkeypox virus. The outbreak reached Europe on 6 May 2022 when the United Kingdom reported their first case of mpox. As of 13 July 2022, 35 European countries and territories have confirmed cases.

== Background ==
Mpox (/ˈɛmpɒks/, EM-poks; originally known as monkeypox) is an infectious viral disease that can occur in humans and other animals. Symptoms include a rash that forms blisters and then crusts over, as well as fever and swollen lymph nodes. The illness is usually mild, and most infected individuals recover within a few weeks without treatment. The time from exposure to the onset of symptoms ranges from three to seventeen days, and symptoms typically last from two to four weeks. However, cases may be severe, especially in children, pregnant women, or people with suppressed immune systems.

The disease is caused by the monkeypox virus, a zoonotic virus in the genus Orthopoxvirus. The variola virus, which causes smallpox, is also in this genus. Human-to-human transmission can occur through direct contact with infected skin or body fluids, including sexual contact. People remain infectious from the onset of symptoms until all the lesions have scabbed and healed. The virus may spread from infected animals through handling infected meat or via bites or scratches. Diagnosis can be confirmed by polymerase chain reaction (PCR) testing a lesion for the virus's DNA.

Vaccination is recommended for those at high risk of infection. No vaccine has been developed specifically against mpox, but smallpox vaccines have been found to be effective. There is no specific treatment for the disease, so the aim of treatment is to manage the symptoms and prevent complications. Antiviral drugs such as tecovirimat can be used to treat mpox, although their effectiveness has not been proven.

== Transmission ==
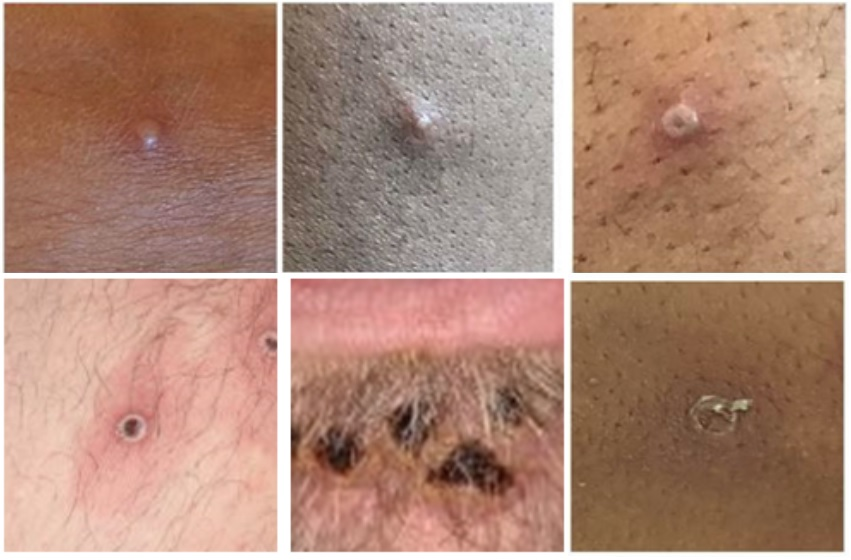
Stages of lesion development.

A large portion of those infected were believed to have not recently traveled to areas of Africa where mpox is normally found, such as Nigeria, the Democratic Republic of the Congo as well as central and western Africa. It is believed to be transmitted by close contact with sick people, with extra caution for those individuals with lesions on their skin or genitals, along with their bedding and clothing. The CDC has also stated that individuals should avoid contact and consumption of dead animals such as rats, squirrels, monkeys and apes along with wild game or lotions derived from animals in Africa.

In addition to more common symptoms, such as fever, headache, swollen lymph nodes, and rashes or lesions, some patients have also experienced proctitis, an inflammation of the rectum lining. CDC has also warned clinicians to not rule out mpox in patients with sexually transmitted infections since there have been reports of co-infections with syphilis, gonorrhea, chlamydia, and herpes.

== Timeline ==
=== Arrival ===
An index case was imported into the United Kingdom in late April 2022, by a man who had travelled to Nigeria, where the disease is endemic. He had already showed symptoms since 29 April, and was admitted to hospital in London on 6 May. On 12 May, the man was confirmed to have contracted mpox. The following day, another mpox case was confirmed, and the United Kingdom reported these cases to the World Health Organization (WHO).

=== Cases transited through Europe ===
==== May ====
===== 18 May =====
On 18 May, Spain and Portugal both confirmed their first cases of mpox following the confirmation of mpox in the United Kingdom starting an outbreak in the countries. It is unknown how it was contracted, but most likely via travel or skin-to-skin contact abroad.

===== 19 May =====
On 19 May, Belgium confirmed its first cases of mpox in two Belgian men, it was later confirmed by Reuters that the men had gone to the same party.

Later, Italy confirmed its first case of mpox in an Italian man in Rome, the man was isolated at the Spallanzani Hospital. The disease was likely contracted from a stay in the Canary Islands. There were 2 suspected cases, which later became confirmed cases.

Sweden then confirmed its first case of mpox in Stockholm, the Swedish Health Agency confirmed it later. The person was not reported to be a woman or a man, but it was most likely a man. It is unknown how it was contracted, but likely via travel or skin-to-skin contact abroad.

===== 20 May =====
On 20 May, France reported their first case of mpox. The patient had no travel history, meaning he didn't contract the disease abroad.

On the same day, Germany and the Netherlands reported their first cases of mpox. It was unknown how it was contracted in both stories, but likely via travel or skin-to-skin contact abroad.

===== 21 May =====
On 21 May, Switzerland confirmed its first case of mpox. It was in a person of undisclosed gender, contracted through "close physical contact" abroad, according to Reuters.

===== 22 May =====
On 22 May, Austria confirmed its first case of mpox. It is unknown how it was contracted or who contracted it, but likely via travel or skin-to-skin contact abroad.

===== 23 May =====
On 23 May, Denmark detected its first mpox infection. It was in an adult male, likely contracted from a trip to Spain, according to Reuters. No cases of mpox were detected in Greenland, a Danish constituent country in North America.

===== 24 May =====
On 24 May, the Czech Republic registered its first case of mpox in a woman, likely picked up from a festival in Belgium, according to Reuters.

On the same day, Slovenia also registered its first case of mpox. It was in a traveller of undisclosed gender who likely contracted mpox from a trip to the Canary Islands, according to Reuters.

===== 27 May =====
On 27 May, Ireland confirmed its first case of mpox in the east of the country. The Health Protection Surveillance Centre (HPSC) commenced publication of a weekly report on the epidemiology of human mpox in Ireland on 9 June.

On the same day, Finland also confirmed its first case of mpox. It was in a man who likely had contracted the disease from a trip to another European country, according to Reuters.

===== 28 May =====
On 28 May, Malta registered its first case of mpox. It was in an adult male, who most likely picked up the disease abroad from one of the countries affected by the outbreak, according to the Malta Times.

===== 31 May =====
On 31 May, Hungary confirmed its first case of mpox, in an adult male. It is still being investigated whether or not he recently travelled, though it is unknown how the man contracted the disease.

On the same day, Norway confirmed its first case of mpox. It was in a person of undisclosed gender who most likely contracted the disease from travelling abroad. The case was linked to the ongoing outbreak in Europe, meaning that the patient may have travelled to a European country that was affected by the outbreak.

==== June ====
===== 1 June =====
On 1 June, Gibraltar, a British Overseas Territory, registered its first case of mpox in a Spanish resident of undisclosed gender working in Gibraltar. The patient likely contracted the disease from close contact with another Spanish national also working in Gibraltar.

===== 3 June =====
On 3 June, Latvia confirmed its first mpox infection. It was in an elderly person of undisclosed gender who most likely contracted the disease abroad.

===== 8 June =====
On 8 June, Greece confirmed the country's first mpox case. It was in a person of undisclosed gender who likely contracted the disease from a trip to Portugal.

===== 9 June =====
On 9 June, Iceland confirmed its first mpox case. It was in two men who most likely contracted the disease from a trip to Europe.

===== 10 June =====
On 10 June, Poland confirmed its first mpox case. It is unknown who the patient is or how it was contracted, but it is possible it was picked up via travel or skin-to-skin contact.

===== 13 June =====
On 13 June, Romania confirmed its first monkempoxypox infection. It was in an adult male who most likely contracted the disease from his partner who travelled in several different European countries that have been affected by mpox at the time.

===== 15 June =====
On 15 June, Luxembourg confirmed its first mpox case. It is unknown how it was contracted, though it is being investigated. The disease was likely picked up via travelling abroad or skin-to-skin contact.

On the same day, Georgia also confirmed its first case of mpox. It was in a patient of undisclosed gender who likely contracted the disease from a trip to Europe.

===== 17 June =====
On 17 June, Serbia confirmed its first case of mpox. It was in a patient of undisclosed gender. It was revealed that it was an "imported case", meaning that the patient may have contracted the disease abroad.

===== 23 June =====
On 23 June, Bulgaria confirmed its first mpox case. It was in two men who most likely contracted the disease from a trip to Spain and the United Kingdom but don't reckon any contact with infected persons.

On the same day, Croatia also received its first case of mpox. It was in an adult man who most likely contracted the disease from a stay in Italy and Spain.

===== 28 June =====
On 28 June, Estonia confirmed its first case of mpox. It was in a middle-aged man who most likely contracted the disease abroad. He had no close contacts with anyone in Estonia.

==== July ====
===== 2 July =====
On 2 July, Andorra registered its first mpox case in a woman of unknown age. It is unknown how it was contracted, but it may likely have been picked up either abroad via travel or via skin-to-skin contact.

===== 7 July =====
On July 7, Slovakia received its first case of mpox. It was in a person of undisclosed gender in the 20-59 age group who most likely contracted the disease abroad.

===== 12 July =====
On 12 July, Russia confirmed its first case of mpox. It was in a man probably in his 20-25 age group who likely contracted the disease from a trip to Europe where the outbreak had started. The man then tested positive for the virus and was isolated in a hospital, most likely in Saint Petersburg.

===== 13 July =====
On 13 July, Bosnia and Herzegovina registered its first mpox case. It is unknown how it was contracted, although the disease was likely picked up abroad via travel or skin-to-skin contact.

===== 22 July =====
On 22 July, Monaco confirmed its first case of mpox, in a man who most likely had travelled to France where the disease was spreading. The Princess Grace Hospital Centre later reported that the first case of the disease had been confirmed in the residential area of La Colle.

==== September ====
===== 15 September =====
On 15 September, Ukraine's Ministry of Health reported the country's first case of mpox. The Ministry noted that the patient, who did not travel abroad, was experiencing "mild symptoms" and undergoing hospital treatment. The region where the case was reported was not disclosed.

== Responses ==
=== World Health Organization (WHO) ===
On 20 May, the WHO convened an emergency meeting of independent advisers to discuss the outbreak and assess the threat level. Its European chief, Hans Kluge, expressed concern that infections could accelerate in Europe as people gather for parties and festivals over the summer. On 14 June, the WHO announced plans to rename the disease from monkeypox to mpox in order to combat stigma and racism surrounding the disease. Another meeting convened on 23 June determined that the outbreak does not constitute a Public Health Emergency of International Concern for the time being.

=== Countries ===
The majority of European countries responded to the outbreak, and the responses of some are listed below.

- Belgium: The Risk Assessment Group (RAG) and health authorities declared that those infected with mpox must self-isolate for 21 days.
- Germany: Fabian Leendertz of the Robert Koch Institute described the outbreak as an epidemic that will not last long: "The cases can be well isolated via contact tracing and there are also drugs and effective vaccines that can be used if necessary."
- Ireland: The Health Service Executive (HSE) has set up a multidisciplinary incident management team to prepare for the possible arrival of mpox, and infectious diseases experts are on alert for patients with symptoms of the virus.
- Kosovo: On 23 May, the Ministry of Health and the National Public Health Institute, have drafted a document of recommendations and measures to help prevent the spread of the disease. In a press statement, healthcare authorities have declared that the situation is being closely monitored.
- Luxembourg: On 21 May, the Ministry of Health said that they are monitoring the situation with its Europe. he National Infectious Diseases Department of the HLC and refrain from close contact activities until the infection has resolved.
- United Kingdom: On 22 May, Education Secretary Nadhim Zahawi said "we're taking it very, very seriously" and that the UK government had already started purchasing smallpox vaccines. The Terrence Higgins Trust and British Association for Sexual Health and HIV (BASHH) expressed concern about the impact on sexual health services in the United Kingdom.

=== Dependent territories ===
- Gibraltar: On 31 May, a Strategic Coordination Group met to discuss Gibraltar's state of preparedness in the eventuality that a case of mpox was confirmed in the territory amid the rapid rise of cases in the United Kingdom and Spain.

== Cases per country and territory ==
This is a table of confirmed and suspected mpox cases in European countries during the ongoing 2022–2023 mpox outbreak. It does not include countries where suspected cases were reported but later discarded. (As of 13 July 2022)

Cases of mpox by countries of Europe (last updated on as of 8 July 2022)
Country	Confirmed	Suspected	Total	Last update	First confirmed case	Last confirmed case
Andorra	1	—	1	8 July 2022	2 July 2022	
Austria	83	—	83	14 July 2022	22 May 2022	
Belgium	225	1	226	14 July 2022	19 May 2022	
Bosnia and Herzegovina	1	—	1	13 July 2022	13 July 2022	
Bulgaria	3	—	3	5 July 2022	23 June 2022	
Croatia	3	—	3	12 July 2022	23 June 2022	
Czech Republic	12	—	12	13 July 2022	24 May 2022	
Denmark	32	—	32	13 July 2022	23 May 2022	
Estonia	2	—	2	5 July 2022	28 June 2022	
Finland	13	—	13	11 July 2022	27 May 2022	
France	912	—	912	12 July 2022	20 May 2022	
Georgia	2	—	2	28 June 2022	15 June 2022	
Germany	1,859	—	1,859	15 July 2022	20 May 2022	
Gibraltar (Note: British Overseas Territory.)	5	—	5	14 July 2022	1 June 2022	
Greece	12	—	12	13 July 2022	8 June 2022	
Hungary	28	—	28	13 July 2022	31 May 2022	
Iceland	6	—	6	7 July 2022	9 June 2022	
Ireland	85	—	85	27 July 2022	27 May 2022	
Italy	339	—	339	15 July 2022	19 May 2022	
Latvia	2	—	2	5 July 2022	3 June 2022	
Luxembourg	7	—	7	5 July 2022	15 June 2022	
Malta	9	—	9	13 July 2022	28 May 2022	
Netherlands	549	—	549	14 July 2022	20 May 2022	
Norway	35	—	35	14 July 2022	31 May 2022	
Poland	22	—	22	13 July 2022	10 June 2022	
Portugal	515	—	515	14 July 2022	18 May 2022	
Romania	16	—	16	14 July 2022	13 June 2022	
Russia	1	—	1	12 July 2022	12 July 2022	
Serbia	5	—	5	14 July 2022	17 June 2022	
Slovakia	1	—	1	7 July 2022	7 July 2022	
Slovenia	19	—	19	13 July 2022	24 May 2022	
Spain	4,371	62	4,433	12 July 2022	18 May 2022	
Sweden	58	—	58	13 July 2022	19 May 2022	
Switzerland	181	—	181	13 July 2022	21 May 2022	
Ukraine	3	—	3	22 September 2022	15 September 2022	
United Kingdom	2,469	—	2,469	14 July 2022	6 May 2022	
Total	10,005	82	10,087	—		

=== Timeline of first confirmed cases by country or territory ===
First confirmed mpox cases by country or territory
Date	Countries / Territories
6 May 2022	United Kingdom
18 May 2022	Spain • Portugal
19 May 2022	Belgium • Italy • Sweden
20 May 2022	France • Germany • Netherlands
21 May 2022	Switzerland
22 May 2022	Austria
23 May 2022	Denmark
24 May 2022	Czech Republic • Slovenia
27 May 2022	Finland • Ireland
28 May 2022	Malta
31 May 2022	Hungary • Norway
1 June 2022	Gibraltar
3 June 2022	Latvia
8 June 2022	Greece
9 June 2022	Iceland
10 June 2022	Poland
13 June 2022	Romania
15 June 2022	Luxembourg • Georgia
17 June 2022	Serbia
23 June 2022	Bulgaria • Croatia
28 June 2022	Estonia
2 July 2022	Andorra
7 July 2022	Slovakia
12 July 2022	Russia
13 July 2022	Bosnia and Herzegovina
15 September 2022	Ukraine

==== Timeline of suspected cases by country or territory ====
Countries listed below had only suspected cases at the time of reporting. Some countries reported confirmed cases after reporting suspected cases. Countries listed several times reported suspected cases again after they discarded suspected cases before.

Timeline of suspected mpox cases by country or territory
Date	Countries / Territories
20 May 2022	Greece (discounted on 22 May)
5 June 2022	Georgia (confirmed on 15 June)

As of 11 July 2022, 33 European countries and territories have been affected by the pandemic.

== See also ==
- Mpox
- Monkeypox virus
- Mpox in Nigeria
- Mpox in the Democratic Republic of the Congo
- 2022–2023 mpox outbreak
- Timeline of the 2022–2023 mpox outbreak
- 2022–2023 mpox outbreak in Asia
- 2022–2023 mpox outbreak in Canada
- 2022–2023 mpox outbreak in Germany
- 2022–2023 mpox outbreak in the Netherlands
- 2022–2023 mpox outbreak in Portugal
- 2022–2023 mpox outbreak in Spain
- 2022–2023 mpox outbreak in the United Kingdom
- 2022–2023 mpox outbreak in the United States
