= 2022–2023 mpox outbreak in Asia =

Ongoing outbreak of mpox in Asia

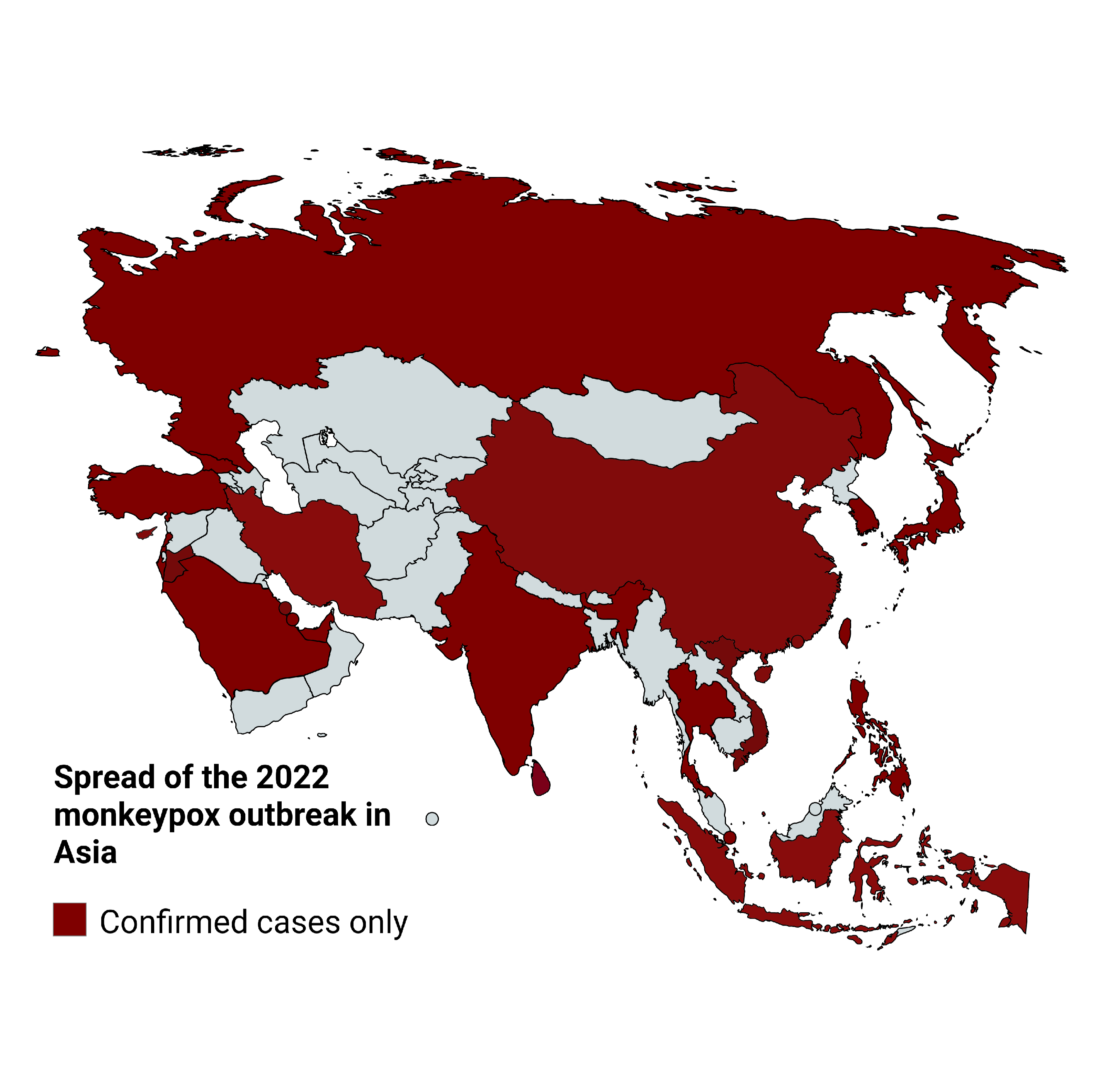
- Spread of disease in Asia as of 29 July 2022 Confirmed cases reported
- Disease: Mpox
- Pathogen: Monkeypox virus (West African clade)
- Index case: Ichilov General Hospital, Tel Aviv, Israel
- Date: 20 May 2022 – ongoing (4 years, 4 months, and 6 days)
- Confirmed cases: 162
- Suspected cases: 4
- Deaths: 1
- Territories: 14 (Note: Including Russia. All fourteen of them have reported confirmed cases.)

The 2022 mpox outbreak in Asia is a part of the ongoing outbreak of human mpox caused by the West African clade of the monkeypox virus. The outbreak was reported in Asia on 20 May 2022 when Israel reported a suspected case of mpox, which was confirmed on 21 May. As of 10 August 2022, seven West Asian, three Southeast Asian, three East Asian and one South Asian country, along with Russia, have reported confirmed cases.

As of 10 August 2022, a total of 162 cases were confirmed. Most of them were concentrated in the region of West Asia, with 141 of the total 156 cases (≈90.38%) being reported in the region. Israel alone has reported 114 cases (≈73.07%). Israel reported the first community transmission of the disease on 21 June 2022.

== Background ==
Mpox (/ˈɛmpɒks/, EM-poks; originally known as monkeypox) is an infectious viral disease that can occur in humans and other animals. Symptoms include a rash that forms blisters and then crusts over, as well as fever and swollen lymph nodes. The illness is usually mild, and most infected individuals recover within a few weeks without treatment. The time from exposure to the onset of symptoms ranges from three to seventeen days, and symptoms typically last from two to four weeks. However, cases may be severe, especially in children, pregnant women, or people with suppressed immune systems.

The disease is caused by the monkeypox virus, a zoonotic virus in the genus Orthopoxvirus. The variola virus, which causes smallpox, is also in this genus. Human-to-human transmission can occur through direct contact with infected skin or body fluids, including sexual contact. People remain infectious from the onset of symptoms until all the lesions have scabbed and healed. The virus may spread from infected animals through handling infected meat or via bites or scratches. Diagnosis can be confirmed by polymerase chain reaction (PCR) testing a lesion for the virus's DNA.

Vaccination is recommended for those at high risk of infection. No vaccine has been developed specifically against mpox, but smallpox vaccines have been found to be effective. There is no specific treatment for the disease, so the aim of treatment is to manage the symptoms and prevent complications. Antiviral drugs such as tecovirimat can be used to treat mpox, although their effectiveness has not been proven.

In May 2022, the World Health Organization (WHO) made an emergency announcement of the existence of a multi-country outbreak of mpox, a viral disease then commonly known as "monkeypox". The initial cluster of cases was found in the United Kingdom, where the first case was detected in London on 6 May 2022 in a patient with a recent travel history from Nigeria where the disease has been endemic. On 16 May, the UK Health Security Agency (UKHSA) confirmed four new cases with no link to travel to a country where mpox is endemic. Subsequently, cases have been reported from many countries and regions. The outbreak marked the first time mpox had spread widely outside Central and West Africa. The disease had been circulating and evolving in human hosts over several years before the outbreak and was caused by the clade IIb variant of the virus.

On 23 July 2022, the director-general of the WHO, Tedros Adhanom Ghebreyesus, declared the outbreak a public health emergency of international concern (PHEIC), stating that "we have an outbreak that has spread around the world rapidly, through new modes of transmission, about which we understand too little". A global response to the outbreak included public awareness campaigns in order to reduce spread of the disease, and repurposing of smallpox vaccines.

== Transmission ==
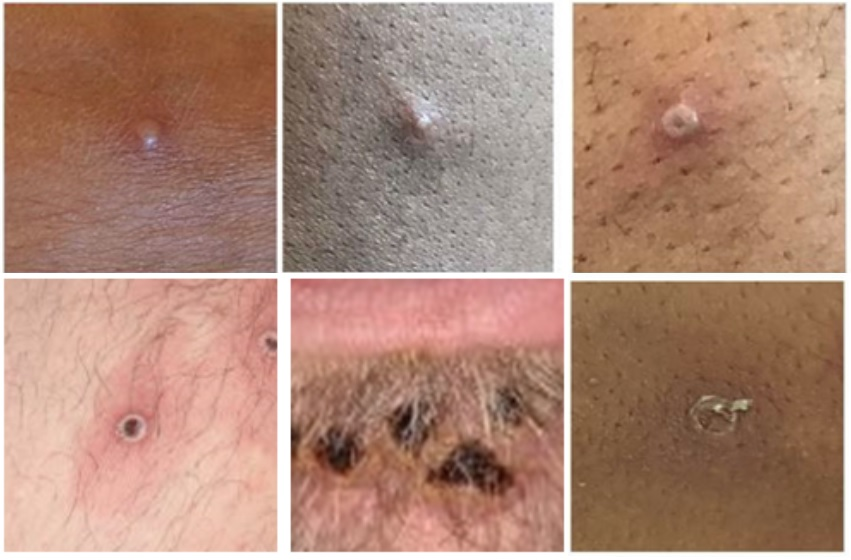
Stages of lesion development.

A large portion of those infected were believed to have not recently traveled to areas of Africa where mpox is normally found, such as Nigeria, the Democratic Republic of the Congo as well as central and western Africa. It is believed to be transmitted by close contact with sick people, with extra caution for those individuals with lesions on their skin or genitals, along with their bedding and clothing. The CDC has also stated that individuals should avoid contact and consumption of dead animals such as rats, squirrels, monkeys and apes along with wild game or lotions derived from animals in Africa.

In addition to more common symptoms, such as fever, headache, swollen lymph nodes, and rashes or lesions, some patients have also experienced proctitis, an inflammation of the rectum lining. CDC has also warned clinicians to not rule out mpox in patients with sexually transmitted infections since there have been reports of co-infections with syphilis, gonorrhea, chlamydia, and herpes.

== History ==
=== Imported cases before the outbreak ===
According to the World Health Organization, imported cases of mpox from Nigeria was detected in Israel and Singapore in September 2018 and May 2019, respectively.

In 2018, an imported case was detected in Israel. A 38-year-old man came from Rivers State, Nigeria in late September. He showed the symptoms of the disease on that month. Later on October the patient sought medical attention at Shaare-Zedek Medical Center in Jerusalem. He was confirmed to be infected with the West African Clade of monkeypox virus that month. All of the patient's contacts were traced and followed up but no virus transmission were detected.

=== Arrival ===
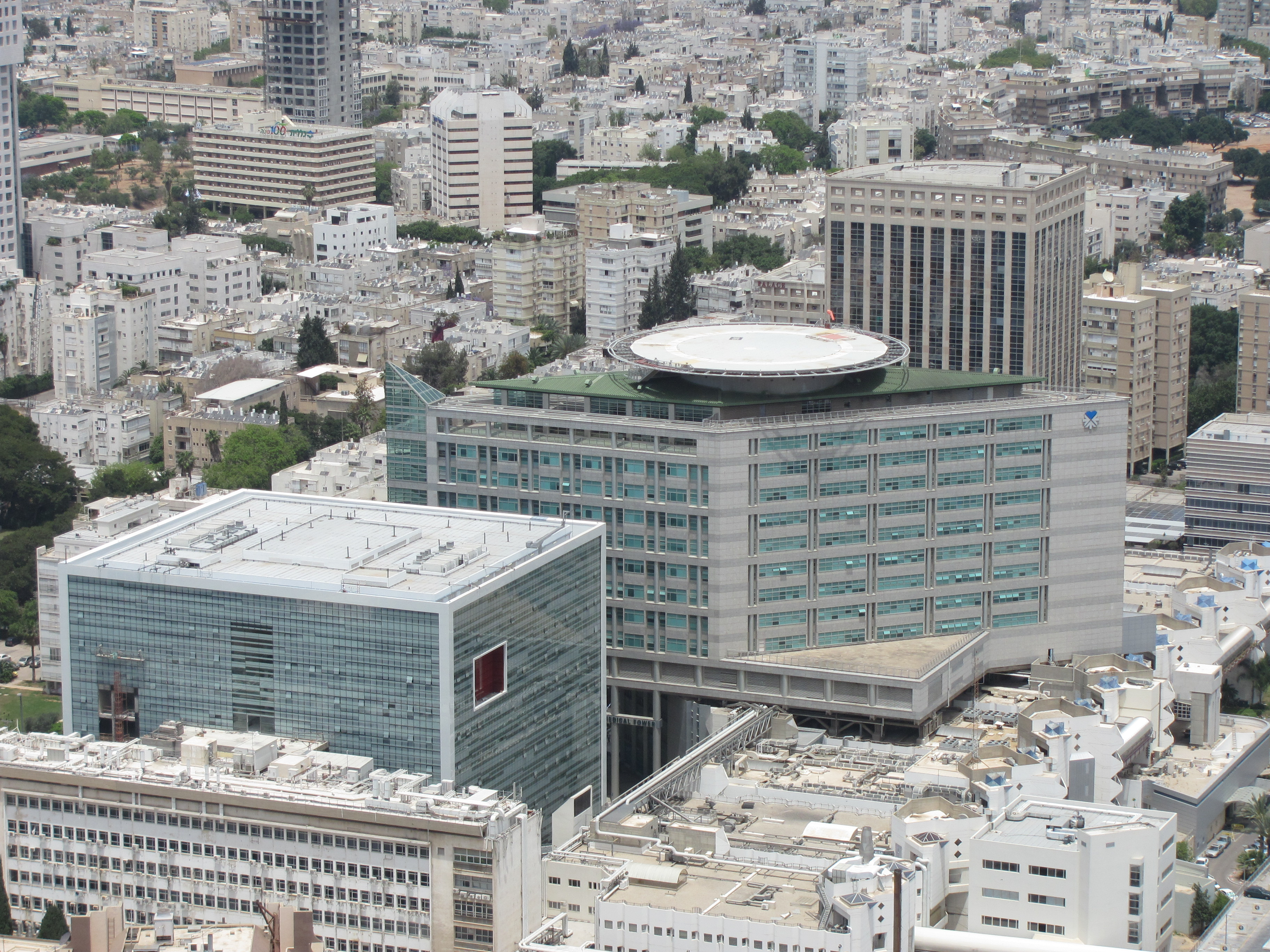
Ichilov General Hospital (in the middle) in Tel Aviv Sourasky Medical Center, where the first case was isolated

As the outbreak was spreading in Europe in the middle of May 2022, the Israeli Health Ministry reported a suspected mpox case in the country on 20 May. The case was confirmed by testing on 21 May, becoming the first case in Israel during the outbreak, which also became the first in Asia.

The 30-year-old man returned from Western Europe and contracted the disease from there. The ministry reported that he was in isolation in the Ichilov General Hospital in Tel Aviv.

=== Cases transited through Asia ===
In May and June 2022, two Australians tested positive for mpox in Australia, but before that they stayed in transit in airports for some hours in Southeast Asia.

On 30 May, Thai health authorities confirmed that an Australian who stayed in transit in Suvarnabhumi Airport for two hours that week had tested positive for mpox in Australia.

On 6 June, the Singaporean Ministry of Health announced that a mpox case in New South Wales in Australia stayed in transit in Singapore on 2 June. 13 people who had casual contact were isolated.

=== Wastewater surveillance ===
A study from the Faculty of Medicine, Chulalongkorn University, Thailand led by Dr Dhammika Leshan Wannigama reported Multiple traces of monkeypox virus were detected in non-sewered wastewater with sparse sampling collected from both the Bangkok, Thailand with increasing concentrations from June to August 2022. This is the first dataset related to monkeypox viral DNA in wastewater in Bangkok. Monkeypox viral DNA was first detected in wastewater in the second week of June 2022. From the first week of July, the number of viral DNA copies increased. Sanger sequencing confirmed the identification of the monkeypox virus and its relation to the 2022–2023 mpox outbreak. The same group later released findings from wastewater surveillance in six Southeast Asian countries (Thailand, Lao PDR, Myanmar, Cambodia, Vietnam, and Indonesia), which showed the presence of Monkeypox virus (MPXV) DNA, suggesting local transmission. This information aids in the distribution of resources such as testing, vaccines, and treatments in regions with limited resources.

=== Timeline of cases by country ===
==== Timeline of first confirmed cases by country or territory ====
First confirmed mpox cases by country or territory
Date	Countries / Territories
21 May 2022	Israel
24 May 2022	United Arab Emirates
15 June 2022	Georgia
20 June 2022	Lebanon • Singapore
22 June 2022	South Korea
24 June 2022	Taiwan (Note: Non-member of the United Nations with limited recognition by some UN member states.)
30 June 2022	Turkey
12 July 2022	Russia
14 July 2022	India • Saudi Arabia
20 July 2022	Qatar
21 July 2022	Thailand
25 July 2022	Japan
29 July 2022	Philippines
2 August 2022	Cyprus
16 August 2022	Iran
19 August 2022	Indonesia
6 September 2022	Hong Kong (Note: Special administrative region of China.)
16 September 2022	China • Jordan • Bahrain
3 October 2022	Vietnam
4 November 2022	Sri Lanka

==== Timeline of suspected cases by country or territory ====
Countries listed below had only suspected cases at the time of reporting. Some countries reported confirmed cases after reporting suspected cases (i.e. Turkey). Countries listed several times reported suspected cases again after they discarded suspected cases before.

Timeline of suspected mpox cases by country or territory
Date	Countries / Territories
20 May 2022	Israel (confirmed on 21 May)
27 May 2022	Iran (discounted on 4 June)
28 May 2022	Malaysia (discounted on 31 May)
29 May 2022	Afghanistan (discounted between 30 May and 5 June)
1 June 2022	Cambodia (discounted on 2 June)
3 June 2022	India (discounted on 7 June)
4 June 2022	Turkey (discounted on 5 June)
5 June 2022	Georgia (confirmed on 15 June)
7 June 2022	Bangladesh (discounted on 9 June)
9 June 2022	Bangladesh (discounted on 12 June)
16 June 2022	Nepal (discounted on 17 June)
21 June 2022	South Korea (confirmed on 22 June)
8 July 2022	India (discounted on 9 July)
14 July 2022	India (confirmed on 14 July)

== Responses ==
Several countries have responded to the outbreak. The responses of some of them are listed below.

- Bangladesh: On 22 May, the Directorate General of Health Services (DGHS) issued warnings at every port in the country to prevent the spread of mpox. The Directorate spokesperson Nazmul Islam said that the DGHS has asked all air, land and sea ports to be alert. Suspected cases are instructed to be sent to an infectious disease hospital and kept in isolation.
- China: On 2 June, the Chinese CDC issued a notice quoting the WHO's document with a translation of the original, "Stigmatising people because of a disease is never okay. Anyone can get or pass on mpox, regardless of their sexuality."
- India: On 21 May, Union Health Minister Mansukh Mandaviya directed the National Centre for Disease Control and the ICMR to keep a close watch and monitor the situation. The Union Health Ministry has also directed airport and port health officers to be vigilant, according to official sources. They have been instructed to isolate and send samples to the National Institute of Virology of any sick passenger with a travel history to infected countries.
- Indonesia: Indonesian health authorities were put on alert when cases of mpox were reported in Australia in May 2022. Mohammad Syahril, ministry spokesperson, urged medical personnel and the country's population to be alert and aware of the symptoms of the disease.
- Malaysia: On 27 May 2022, the Malaysian Ministry of Health reactivated the MySejahtera app to provide information and surveillance on mpox.
- Philippines: Health Secretary Francisco Duque III said that the Philippines was intensifying its border control measures amid the threat of mpox. The health department stated it is exploring potential sources of mpox vaccines and antivirals.
- Saudi Arabia: On May 21, the Saudi Ministry of Health stated that they are ready to monitor and investigate cases of mpox, if any occurs. They added that it also has an integrated preventive plan to deal with such cases if they appear, including identifying suspected and confirmed cases.
- Taiwan: On 30 May, the Taiwan Centers for Disease Control officially listed mpox as a notifiable infectious disease, and on June 23, mpox was officially upgraded to a second-class notifiable infectious disease, which means that confirmed cases must be notified within 24 hours, and if necessary, isolation treatment may be implemented in designated isolation treatment institutions.
- Thailand: On 24 May 2022, the Department of Disease Control (DDC) started screening all overseas passengers from Central African countries and other outbreak countries at international airports. On 26 May 2022, the DDC set up an emergency operations center to monitor the outbreak situation and plan for a possible outbreak in the kingdom. Anutin Charnvirakul, Minister of Public Health, said that the government is seeking a smallpox vaccine from the WHO to bolster the public's immunity in case of a viral outbreak. On 30 May 2022, The local news reported the first case of mpox in the country. The patient was a passenger who was transiting from Europe to Australia via Bangkok. However, the patient's symptoms developed and were diagnosed in Australia. There have been no local cases discovered as of yet.
- Vietnam: On May 24, 2022, Vietnam's Ministry of Health asked border localities to increase surveillance to detect possible cases of mpox.

== Outbreak by regions and countries ==
=== Western Asia ===
==== Georgia ====
Georgia was the first Caucasian and the third Asian and West Asian country to report confirmed cases of mpox. The first case was reported by the Ministry of Health on 15 June 2022.

==== Israel ====
Israel was the first in both Asia and West Asia to report a case.

On 20 May, Israel reported a suspected mpox infected patient who was in isolation in Ichilov Hospital and tested positive on 21 May. On the same day, another suspected case was reported but the case was ruled out the next day, on 22 May.

Israel reported a single case each on 28 May and 7, 9, 15 and 16 June until the authorities reported three cases on 20 June. In a press statement released on 21 June, the ministry stated that one of them was infected locally, confirming community transmission of the disease in Israel. The total reached 9 on that day.

The case figure was updated regularly and press releases were released on the ministry's website whenever cases where reported. But after 21 June, the ministry started to release weekly report of the situation on the website.

On 15 July, Health Minister Nitzan Horowitz announced that 2,000 mpox vaccines will arrive in Israel, adding that he spoke with biotech company Bavarian Nordic CEO Paul Chaplin. He also said that a total of 90 cases were registered till then, and none of them needed hospitalisation.

As of 17 July 2022, 96 confirmed cases were reported in Israel.

==== Lebanon ====
On 20 June, the first case of mpox in Lebanon was reported by the National News Agency (NNA) stating the Ministry of Health, thus Lebanon became the fourth country in both Asia and West Asia and the third in the Middle East to report a mpox case.

==== Saudi Arabia ====
On 14 July, the first mpox case was detected in the capital city of Riyadh. The person came from abroad.

=== South Asia ===
==== Afghanistan ====
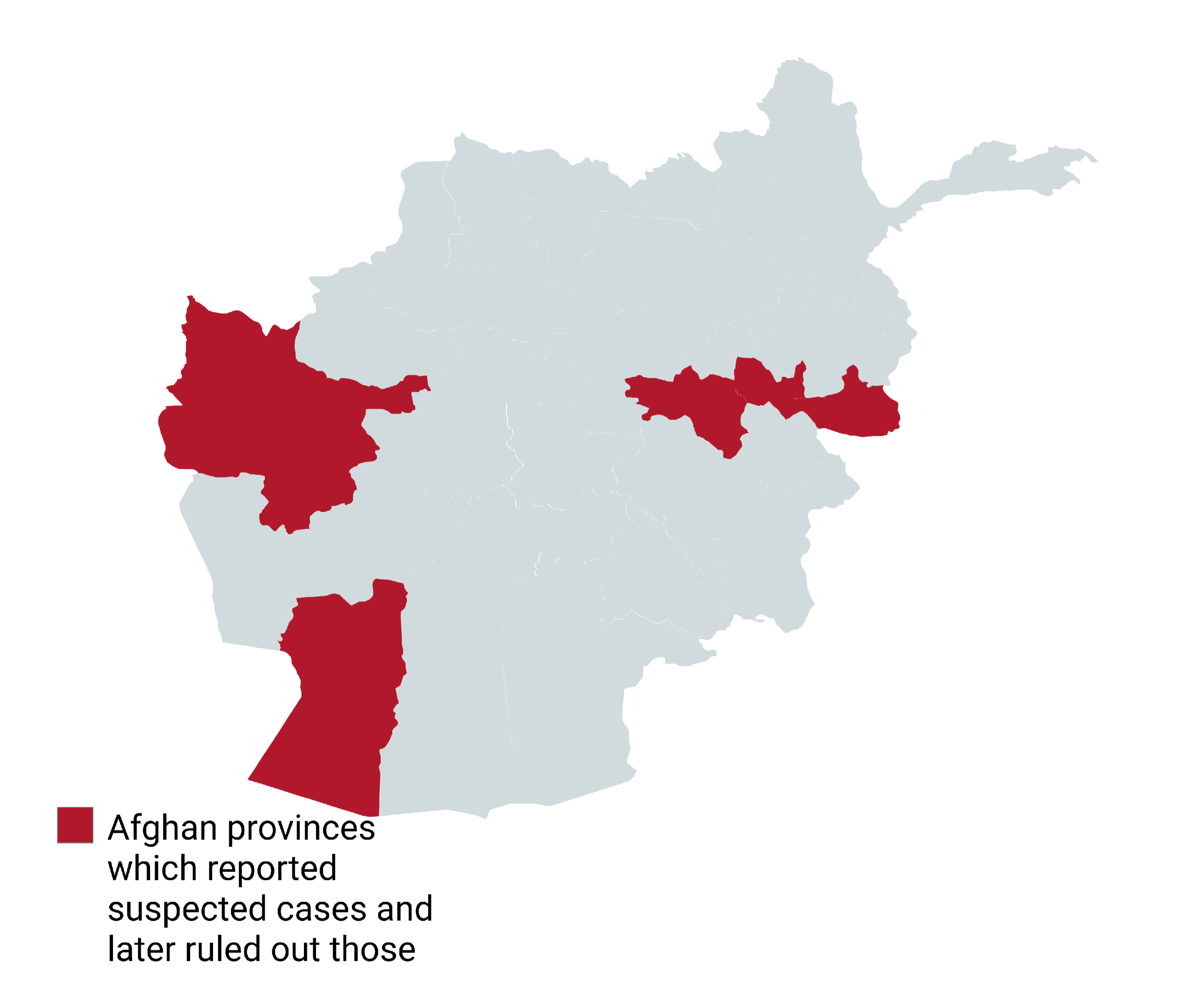
Afghanistan provinces in red reported suspected cases of mpox, but cases later tested negative, as of 5 June 2022

On 29 May, the Islamic Republic News Agency and other news agencies reported two suspected cases of mpox who came back from Iran in Nimruz Province citing local newspapers and the Ministry of Health and provincial health authorities.

On 30 May, one case was reported in Herat Province.

On 31 May, ministry spokesperson Javid Hazhir denied reports of confirmed cases and stated that suspected cases in Nimruz and Kabul provinces tested negative. He also said that Afghanistan has the capability to test mpox cases.

On 5 June, it was reported that the WHO will give test kits to the Taliban-controlled Ministry of Public Health, as they were lacking kits. Ministry spokesperson stated that suspected cases in Herat, Maidan Wardak and Nangarhar provinces along with other provinces which were stated earlier tested negative and the country is free of mpox.

==== Bangladesh ====
Bangladeshi health authorities declared alert on every ports in the country in mid-May. Shahjalal International Airport in Dhaka was in high alert.

On 7 June, a 32-year-old Turkish citizen was detected with mpox symptoms at the airport while screening. He was taken to the Infectious Diseases Hospital in Dhaka's Mohakhali and isolated. Although, on the same day the Ministry of Health and Family Welfare published a press release denying reports of mpox 'confirmed' in a foreigner.

On the next day, the DGHS director stated that he investigated the Turkish citizen himself, and his symptoms were not due to mpox, and he was suffering from a skin disease for a long time.

On 9 June, the suspected case tested negative.

On 10 June, a 60-year-old woman was isolated in Chuadanga after local doctors detected symptoms of mpox on her on 9 June. On the same day, a 42-year-old man who came back from India through Benapole Border Crossing on 3 June, was sent to Jashore Hospital after he showed pox like symptoms. Although, the district civil surgeon said on the next day that he was very probably infected with chickenpox.

On 12 June, the case in Chuandanga was discarded.

Bangladesh was the first country bar shore passes. On late May, Chittagong Seaport authority barred shore passes for all crew unless in the case of an emergency, while signed-off crew will have to undergo health checks.

==== India ====
On 21 May, Union Health Minister Mansukh Mandaviya directed the National Centre for Disease Control and the ICMR to keep a close watch and monitor the situation and directed airport and port health officers to be vigilant. They have been instructed to isolate and send samples to the National Institute of Virology (NIV) of any sick passenger with a travel history to infected countries.

Many other states also responded individually, including Karnataka, Kerala, Madhya Pradesh, Maharashtra, Rajasthan, Tamil Nadu, Uttar Pradesh, and West Bengal.

On 3 June, a sample of a 5-year-old girl of Ghaziabad in Uttar Pradesh who showed some symptoms of mpox were sent to the National Institute of Virology in Pune. The test came back negative on 7 June.

On 14 July, the health minister of Kerala Veena George announced a suspected case in Kerala. The patient was a male who came back from the United Arab Emirates three days earlier. The patient reportedly died on 31 July, making it the first mpox casualty in India.

=== Southeast Asia ===
==== Singapore ====
On 21 June 2022, Singaporean officials reported that a British flight attendant in the country had tested positive for the virus on 20 June. Singapore was the fifth Asian and first Southeast Asian country to report an mpox case during this outbreak.

On 6 July, Singaporean authorities confirmed the first case of local transmission. One more imported case was reported each on 7 and 8 July 2022, of which both are conveyed to the National Centre for Infectious Diseases (NCID).

On 13 July, the Ministry of Health reported another locally transmitted case, taking the total tally to 5. The patient was a 48-year-old British national residing in Singapore and was also warded in the NCID.

Another local case was reported on the next day on 14 July. The patient was a male in his 40s, and was also warded in the NCID.

==== Thailand ====
On 21 July 2022, the Thai health ministry reported the first case of mpox in the country. The patient was a 21-year-old Nigerian who stayed in Phuket before crossing the border into Cambodia and subsequently arrested in Phnom Penh. A week later, a second confirmed case was found in Bangkok in a 47-year-old local man who admitted to have engaged in sexual contact with foreign men.

On 3 August, a third confirmed case was reported by the Department of Disease Control. The patient was a 25-year-old German man who arrived in Phuket on July 18 as a tourist. On 5 August, the first confirmed case of a female in the country was announced. The patient was a 22-year-old Thai woman who frequented Bangkok night spots. On 15 August, it was reported that the fifth confirmed mpox patient in the country was a 25-year-old Thai woman returning from Dubai. A study from the Faculty of Medicine, Chulalongkorn University, Thailand led by Dr Dhammika Leshan Wannigama reported Multiple traces of monkeypox virus were detected in non-sewered wastewater in Thailand with increasing concentrations from June to August 2022.

=== East Asia ===
==== China ====
On 16 September, China reported its first case of mpox in Chongqing municipality.

==== Japan ====
On 25 July, Japan reported its first case of mpox in a man in his 30s. On 28 July, a second case was reported from a man in his 30s. On 5 August, a third case was reported. On 10 August, a fourth case was reported.

==== South Korea ====
On 22 June, South Korea reported its first mpox case.

==== Taiwan ====
On 24 June 2022, Taiwan reported its first confirmed case of mpox in a 25-year-old Taiwanese man who came back to Taiwan on 16 June after studying in Germany. Domestic transmission of mpox was reported in March 2023, followed by the first Taiwanese death from mpox in November 2023. Taiwan avoided domestic transmission of the disease for fourteen consecutive weeks, until late February 2024.

=== North Asia (Russia) ===
The first mpox case in Russia, and by extension North Asia, was confirmed on 12 July 2022, in a young man who returned from a trip to Europe.

== Statistics ==
=== Overview ===
This is a table of confirmed and suspected mpox cases in Asian countries during the ongoing 2022–2023 mpox outbreak. It does not include countries where suspected cases were reported but later discarded such as Afghanistan.

Cases of mpox by countries of Asia (last updated on 30 August 2024)
Country	Confirmed Cases	Suspected Cases	Total Cases	Deaths	Last Update	First Confirmed Cases	Last Confirmed Cases
Israel	317	—	317	—	13 August 2022	21 May 2022	
United Arab Emirates	24	—	24	—	13 August 2022	24 May 2022	
Singapore	63	—	63	—	13 August 2022	20 June 2022	
India	27	4	31	1	13 August 2022	14 July 2022	
Lebanon	6	—	6	—	13 August 2022	20 June 2022	
Saudi Arabia	764	—	764	—	13 August 2022	14 July 2022	
Taiwan	340	—	340	—	13 August 2022	24 June 2022	
Qatar	5	—	5	—	13 August 2022	20 July 2022	
Thailand	805	—	805	10	13 August 2022	21 July 2022	
Japan	248	—	248	1	13 August 2022	25 July 2022	
Georgia	2	—	2	—	15 June 2022	15 June 2022	
South Korea	165	—	165	—	22 June 2022	22 June 2022	
Turkey	12	—	12	—	13 August 2022	30 June 2022	
Russia	4	—	4	—	12 July 2022	12 July 2022	
Philippines	10	—	10	—	29 July 2022	29 July 2022	
China	2,541	—	2,541	1	16 September 2022	16 September 2022	
Total	5,333	4	5,337	13	—		

=== Graphs ===
(These graphs excludes the cases reported in Russia)

==== New confirmed cases of mpox per week ====
(A week is considered Saturday to Friday here)

==== Total confirmed cases of mpox by week ====
(A week is considered Saturday to Friday here)

== See also ==
- 2022–2023 mpox outbreak
- Timeline of the 2022–2023 mpox outbreak
- Mpox in Nigeria
- Mpox in the Democratic Republic of the Congo
- 2022–2023 mpox outbreak in Europe
  - 2022–2023 mpox outbreak in France
  - 2022–2023 mpox outbreak in Germany
  - 2022–2023 mpox outbreak in the Netherlands
  - 2022–2023 mpox outbreak in Portugal
  - 2022–2023 mpox outbreak in Spain
  - 2022–2023 mpox outbreak in the United Kingdom
- 2022–2023 mpox outbreak in Canada
- 2022–2023 mpox outbreak in Peru
- 2022–2023 mpox outbreak in South Africa
- 2022–2023 mpox outbreak in the United States
