= 2022–2024 mpox outbreak in New Zealand =

Disease outbreak in New Zealand

- Disease: Mpox
- Pathogen: Monkeypox virus (West African clade)
- Location: New Zealand
- Index case: Auckland
- Arrival date: July 9, 2022–present (3 years, 10 months, 1 week and 1 day)

The 2022–2024 mpox outbreak in New Zealand is a part of the outbreak of human mpox caused by the West African clade of the monkeypox virus. The outbreak reached New Zealand on 9 July 2022. By 15 August 2024, there had been 53 local cases of confirmed mpox in New Zealand since July 2022; with four occurring in Auckland in 2024. In mid-September 2024, a local outbreak linked to the Queenstown Winter Pride festival in late August 2024 had been reported.

== Background ==
Mpox (/ˈɛmpɒks/, EM-poks; originally known as monkeypox) is an infectious viral disease that can occur in humans and other animals. Symptoms include a rash that forms blisters and then crusts over, as well as fever and swollen lymph nodes. The illness is usually mild, and most infected individuals recover within a few weeks without treatment. The time from exposure to the onset of symptoms ranges from three to seventeen days, and symptoms typically last from two to four weeks. However, cases may be severe, especially in children, pregnant women, or people with suppressed immune systems.

The disease is caused by the monkeypox virus, a zoonotic virus in the genus Orthopoxvirus. The variola virus, which causes smallpox, is also in this genus. Human-to-human transmission can occur through direct contact with infected skin or body fluids, including sexual contact. People remain infectious from the onset of symptoms until all the lesions have scabbed and healed. The virus may spread from infected animals through handling infected meat or via bites or scratches. Diagnosis can be confirmed by polymerase chain reaction (PCR) testing a lesion for the virus's DNA.

Vaccination is recommended for those at high risk of infection. No vaccine has been developed specifically against mpox, but smallpox vaccines have been found to be effective. There is no specific treatment for the disease, so the aim of treatment is to manage the symptoms and prevent complications. Antiviral drugs such as tecovirimat can be used to treat mpox, although their effectiveness has not been proven.

In May 2022, the World Health Organization (WHO) made an emergency announcement of the existence of a multi-country outbreak of mpox, a viral disease then commonly known as "monkeypox". The initial cluster of cases was found in the United Kingdom, where the first case was detected in London on 6 May 2022 in a patient with a recent travel history from Nigeria where the disease has been endemic. On 16 May, the UK Health Security Agency (UKHSA) confirmed four new cases with no link to travel to a country where mpox is endemic. Subsequently, cases have been reported from many countries and regions. The outbreak marked the first time mpox had spread widely outside Central and West Africa. The disease had been circulating and evolving in human hosts over several years before the outbreak and was caused by the clade IIb variant of the virus.

On 23 July 2022, the director-general of the WHO, Tedros Adhanom Ghebreyesus, declared the outbreak a public health emergency of international concern (PHEIC), stating that "we have an outbreak that has spread around the world rapidly, through new modes of transmission, about which we understand too little". A global response to the outbreak included public awareness campaigns in order to reduce spread of the disease, and repurposing of smallpox vaccines.

== Transmission ==
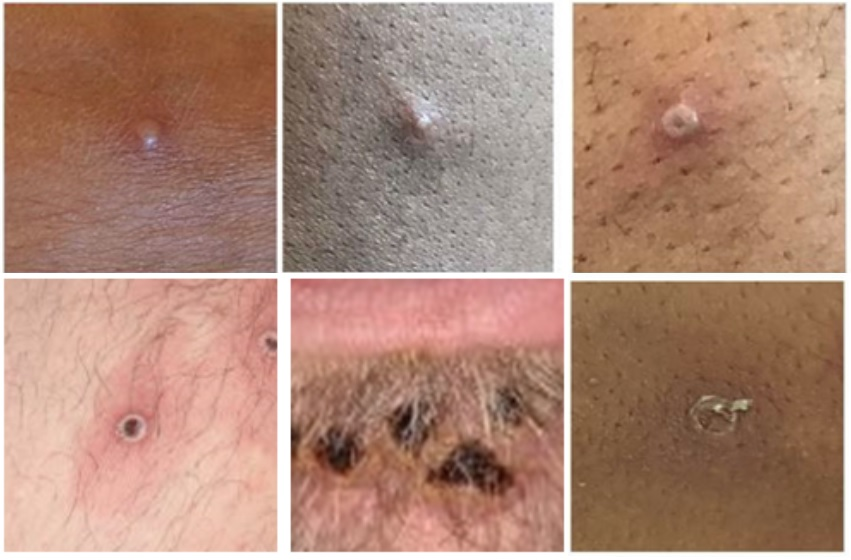
Stages of lesion development. Picture taken by Dr O.O. Afuye on 15 September 2019.

A large portion of those infected were believed to have not recently traveled to areas of Africa where mpox is normally found, such as Nigeria, the Democratic Republic of the Congo as well as central and western Africa. It is believed to be transmitted by close contact with sick people, with extra caution for those individuals with lesions on their skin or genitals, along with their bedding and clothing. The CDC has also stated that individuals should avoid contact and consumption of dead animals such as rats, squirrels, monkeys and apes along with wild game or lotions derived from animals in Africa.

In addition to more common symptoms, such as fever, headache, swollen lymph nodes, and rashes or lesions, some patients have also experienced proctitis, an inflammation of the rectum lining. CDC has also warned clinicians to not rule out mpox in patients with sexually transmitted infections since there have been reports of co-infections with syphilis, gonorrhea, chlamydia, and herpes.

== History ==
On 9 July 2022, the Ministry of Health confirmed New Zealand's first case of mpox. The individual was an Auckland resident in their 20s who had recently returned from overseas travel in a country with reported cases of mpox.

On 12 July 2022, New Zealand reported its second case of mpox. The Health Ministry confirmed that the individual had no links to the first case and had also returned from overseas travel.

By 9 January 2023, the country had reported a total 41 cases of mpox. That same day, Associate Health Minister Ayesha Verrall confirmed that the New Zealand Government purchased 5,000 vials of mpox vaccines, enough for 20,000 people. A further shipment of vaccine vials was ordered for the later half of 2023. Individuals eligible for the mpox vaccine included close physical contacts of people with mpox including sexual partners and household contacts; gay, bisexual, and other men who have sex with multiple partners, transgender and cisgender women who are in sexual relationships with these men; and those recommended to have the vaccine by medical specialists.

By 15 August 2024, Health New Zealand (Te Whatu Ora) had confirmed that there had been a total 53 local cases of mpox since July 2022; with four being reported in 2024 in Auckland.

On 9 September 2024, a new mpox case was reported. The individual had attended the Winter Pride festival in Queenstown in August 2024. On 11 September, a second mpox case was linked to the Queenstown Winter Pride festival.

By 20 September, a total of 11 cases of mpox had been linked to the Winter Pride festival. The Queenstown outbreak also included several cases of mpox clade II.

== See also ==
- 2022-2023 mpox outbreak
- 2023–2024 mpox epidemic
