= 2022–2023 mpox outbreak in the United States =

Ongoing viral outbreak

2022–2024 mpox outbreak in the United States
- Spread of mpox by US state as of September 24, 2022
- Disease: Mpox
- Pathogen: Monkeypox virus (West African clade)
- Location: United States
- Index case: Boston, Massachusetts
- Arrival date: May 17, 2022 (4 years and 2 days ago)
- Date: as of May 13, 2025
- Confirmed cases: 34,730
- Deaths: 63

Government website
- www.cdc.gov/poxvirus/mpox/response/2022/

The 2022–2023 mpox outbreak in the United States was part of the larger outbreak of human mpox caused by the West African clade of the monkeypox virus. The United States was the fourth country outside of the African countries with endemic mpox to experience an outbreak in 2022. The first case was documented in Boston, Massachusetts, on May 17, 2022. As of August 2022, mpox had spread to all 50 states in the United States, as well as Washington, D.C., and Puerto Rico. The United States had the highest number of mpox cases in the world during the outbreak. California had the highest number of mpox cases in the United States.

On August 4, 2022, the U.S. Centers for Disease Control and Prevention declared mpox a public health emergency in the United States. Wyoming was the last state in the United States to report at least one mpox case. On August 30, 2022, the first mpox death in the United States was reported.

== Background ==
Mpox (/ˈɛmpɒks/, EM-poks; originally known as monkeypox) is an infectious viral disease that can occur in humans and other animals. Symptoms include a rash that forms blisters and then crusts over, as well as fever and swollen lymph nodes. The illness is usually mild, and most infected individuals recover within a few weeks without treatment. The time from exposure to the onset of symptoms ranges from three to seventeen days, and symptoms typically last from two to four weeks. However, cases may be severe, especially in children, pregnant women, or people with suppressed immune systems.

The disease is caused by the monkeypox virus, a zoonotic virus in the genus Orthopoxvirus. The variola virus, which causes smallpox, is also in this genus. Human-to-human transmission can occur through direct contact with infected skin or body fluids, including sexual contact. People remain infectious from the onset of symptoms until all the lesions have scabbed and healed. The virus may spread from infected animals through handling infected meat or via bites or scratches. Diagnosis can be confirmed by polymerase chain reaction (PCR) testing a lesion for the virus's DNA.

Vaccination is recommended for those at high risk of infection. No vaccine has been developed specifically against mpox, but smallpox vaccines have been found to be effective. There is no specific treatment for the disease, so the aim of treatment is to manage the symptoms and prevent complications. Antiviral drugs such as tecovirimat can be used to treat mpox, although their effectiveness has not been proven.

An ongoing outbreak of mpox was confirmed on May 6, 2022, beginning with a British resident who, after travelling to Nigeria (where the disease is endemic), presented symptoms consistent with mpox on April 29, 2022. The resident returned to the United Kingdom on May 4, creating the country's index case of the outbreak. The origin of several of the cases of mpox in the United Kingdom is unknown. Some monitors saw community transmission taking place in the London area as of mid-May, but it has been suggested that cases were already spreading in Europe in the previous months.

== Transmission ==
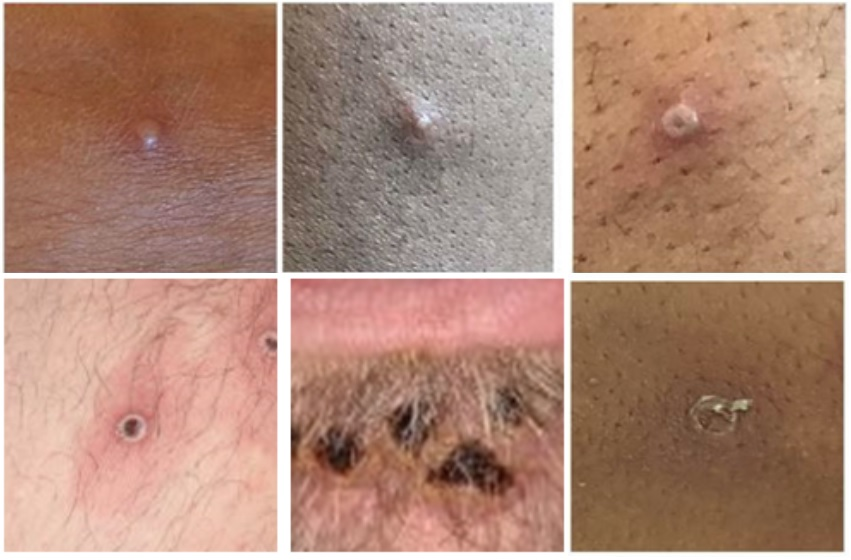
Stages of lesion development.

A large portion of those infected were believed to have not recently traveled to areas of Africa where mpox is normally found, such as Nigeria, the Democratic Republic of the Congo as well as central and western Africa. It is believed to be transmitted by close contact with sick people, with extra caution for those individuals with lesions on their skin or genitals, along with their bedding and clothing. The CDC has also stated that individuals should avoid contact and consumption of dead animals such as rats, squirrels, monkeys, and apes along with wild game or lotions derived from animals in Africa.

In addition to more common symptoms, such as fever, headache, swollen lymph nodes, and rashes or lesions, some patients have also experienced proctitis, an inflammation of the rectum lining. CDC has also warned clinicians to not rule out mpox in patients with sexually transmitted infections since there have been reports of co-infections with syphilis, gonorrhea, chlamydia, and herpes.

The CDC has stated that, among mpox cases with available data, 99% occurred in men, 94% of whom reported recent male-to-male sexual or close intimate contact.

== Cases transited through the United States ==
=== California ===
The 2022–2023 mpox outbreak in California. As of July 2022, the virus has infected 4,886 people in the U.S. state of California, with 1 death. The state has the highest number of recorded cases in the country.

=== Florida ===
Florida currently has 2,444 people infected by the virus, with no deaths. It started on May 23, 2022, in Fort Lauderdale and quickly started spreading across the State.

=== New York ===
The 2022–2023 mpox outbreak in New York currently has no deaths. This state has the second highest number of recorded cases in the country with 3,679 cases.

In New York the outbreak began on June 10, 2022, with the first mpox case recorded in Ithaca. On July 29, Governor Kathy Hochul declared a public state disaster emergency in New York State. New York is currently the state with the highest recorded number of cases in the US.

The World Health Organization in New York reports its first mpox case outside New York City on June 7.

On July 13, New York becomes the epicenter of the outbreak. With 489 cases only behind California with 266 cases.

On July 27, New York reaches 1,228 cases, with an increase of 739 cases in only 14 days.

On August 1, Mayor Eric Adams declares a state of emergency over the mpox outbreak.

==== Cases by county ====
Based from the NYSDOH.

Cases of mpox
County	Cases	Change (Note: This is the increase in cases over the previous day.)
Albany	3	(+0)
Broome	1	(+0)
Chemung	1	(+0)
Columbia	1	(+0)
Dutchess	5	(+0)
Erie	5	(+0)
Greene	1	(+0)
Monroe	7	(+0)
Nassau	14	(+0)
Niagara	1	(+0)
Orange	6	(+0)
Rockland	4	(+0)
St. Lawrence	1	(+0)
Suffolk	25	(+0)
Sullivan	2	(+0)
Tompkins	2	(+0)
Westchester	50	(+0)
New York City	1,831	(+0)
Total cases	1,960	(+0)
As of August 8, 2022 at 2:00 pm Eastern Time		

== Timeline ==
The first known case was detected on May 18, 2022, in a man from Boston, Massachusetts, who had traveled to Canada, where a case of the virus was reported the following day. The person was hospitalized in Boston. There, he tested positive for mpox, becoming the first case in the United States.

Two days after the man tested positive for the virus, other states began reporting cases, with New York reporting its first case on May 21. On May 22, President Biden gave a speech at Osan Air Base in South Korea during which he indicated the disease was "something that everybody should be concerned about". On May 26, Virginia reported its first case in a woman who had traveled to Africa, followed by California and Hawaii on June 4, 2022. As of June 3, the United States had 21 confirmed cases, a number which had risen to 460 as of July 1.

On May 23, 2022, Florida reported a case of mpox. On the same day, the Tampa Bay Times reported that the Florida Department of Health had announced the case on a man that had been isolated since the day before. WESH later on also confirmed the case, which was in Broward County. The following day, WESH reported another mpox case as being "investigated". The case was then confirmed to be in the same county as the first case, adding up the total in the county to two. Later, a third case was also investigated, this time being reported by CBS Miami to also be in the same county as the first and second case. This case added up the total in the United States to 18. A fourth case was reported by the Sun-Sentinel, although the state of Florida did not disclose the county where it was detected.

In early June 2022, a man in Washington, D.C., was reported to test positive for orthopox, potentially mpox.

On July 26, 2022, the United States had more mpox cases than any other country. At the end of August 2022, there were early signs that the mpox spread in the U.S. may be slowing.

Ref:

- FRA: 2022–2023 mpox outbreak in France#Cases, rev. Oct. 8, 2022
- GER: 2022–2023 mpox outbreak in Germany#Cumulative number of cases, rev. Oct. 8, 2022

== Cases by state ==
Data sourced from the CDC

Cases of mpox
State	Cases	Change (Note: This is the increase in cases from September 23rd, 2022, to January 4th, 2023 .)
Alabama	186	(+74)
Alaska	5	—
Arizona	580	(+134)
Arkansas	72	(+16)
California	5,670	(+784)
Colorado	407	(+144)
Connecticut	144	(+20)
Delaware	43	(+7)
District of Columbia	525	(+31)
Florida	2,855	(+411)
Georgia	1,984	(+248)
Hawaii	35	(+8)
Idaho	16	(+4)
Illinois	1,422	(+152)
Indiana	285	(+62)
Iowa	29	(+4)
Kansas	47	(+38)
Kentucky	97	(+46)
Louisiana	306	(+63)
Maine	13	(+4)
Maryland	739	(+103)
Massachusetts	456	(+75)
Michigan	395	(+138)
Minnesota	234	(+52)
Mississippi	108	(+35)
Missouri	209	(+101)
Montana	7	(+2)
Nebraska	31	(+3)
Nevada	319	(+101)
New Hampshire	33	(+4)
New Jersey	764	(+81)
New Mexico	57	(+17)
New York	4,203	(+361)
North Carolina	728	(+216)
North Dakota	6	—
Ohio	263	(+128)
Oklahoma	68	(+32)
Oregon	270	(+65)
Pennsylvania	864	(+128)
Puerto Rico	198	(+28)
Rhode Island	84	(+11)
South Carolina	226	(+70)
South Dakota	3	(+1)
Tennessee	392	(+119)
Texas	2,882	(+657)
Utah	194	(+45)
Vermont	3	—
Virginia	564	(+112)
Washington	658	(+75)
West Virginia	12	(+1)
Wisconsin	87	(+18)
Wyoming	4	(+2)
Total cases	29782	(+4,936)
As of January 4, 2023 at 2:00 pm EDT		

=== Timeline of first confirmed cases by state ===
First confirmed mpox cases by state
Date	States
May 18, 2022	Massachusetts
May 21, 2022	New York
May 23, 2022	Florida
May 25, 2022	Utah
May 26, 2022	Virginia • Colorado
May 27, 2022	Washington • California
June 2, 2022	Pennsylvania • Illinois
June 3, 2022	Hawaii
June 5, 2022	District of Columbia
June 6, 2022	Georgia
June 7, 2022	Texas
June 9, 2022	Rhode Island
June 14, 2022	Ohio • Oklahoma
June 15, 2022	Nevada
June 16, 2022	Maryland • Oregon
June 18, 2022	Indiana
June 20, 2022	New Jersey
June 22, 2022	Missouri
June 23, 2022	North Carolina
June 24, 2022	Kentucky
June 17, 2022	Nebraska • Minnesota
June 29, 2022	New Hampshire • Michigan
June 30, 2022	Wisconsin
July 1, 2022	Iowa
July 5, 2022	Connecticut
July 6, 2022	Arkansas • Idaho
July 7, 2022	Louisiana • Tennessee
July 8, 2022	South Carolina • West Virginia
July 9, 2022	Kansas
July 11, 2022	New Mexico
July 12, 2022	Delaware • Arizona
July 14, 2022	South Dakota
July 15, 2022	Alabama
July 20, 2022	North Dakota
July 22, 2022	Maine
July 25, 2022	Mississippi
July 29, 2022	Alaska • Vermont
August 5, 2022	Montana
August 22, 2022	Wyoming

=== Timeline of first deaths by state ===
As of May 8, 2023 there have been 42 mpox-related deaths reported in the US.

First confirmed mpox deaths by state
Date	States
August 30, 2022	Texas
September 13, 2022	California

== Responses ==
=== Vaccination ===
On May 19, 2022, Bavarian Nordic announced that BARDA, part of the Department of Health and Human Services (HHS), exercised a $119 million option, under a $299 million contract, to supply a freeze-dried version of JYNNEOS vaccine, converting existing bulk vaccine. The United States spent $119 million to purchase doses of the Modified vaccinia Ankara-based two-shot Jynneos vaccine from Bavarian Nordic in May 2022. The contract also allows the United States to purchase an additional $180 million worth of the vaccine at a later date. The vaccine, JYNNEOS (also known by the brand names Imvamune and Imvanex), was approved by FDA in 2019 to prevent both smallpox and mpox. As of June 14, the United States had around 70,000 doses of JYNNEOS in its stockpile, and the federal government placed an order for 500,000 more on June 10, 2022. Dawn O'Connell, assistant secretary for preparedness and response at Department of Health and Human Services (HHS), said around 300,000 doses would be delivered in June–July 2022, and the remainder would be delivered later in that year.

In addition, the Strategic National Stockpile (SNS) holds over 100 million doses of an older smallpox vaccine (ACAM2000).

As of June 28, the Biden administration was allocating tens of thousands of vaccine doses from the Strategic National Stockpile to clinics nation-wide. The rollout of vaccines and testing was criticized as too slow, as well as for having similar problems to the rollout of vaccines and tests during the COVID-19 pandemic in the United States.

The United States government's response is coordinated by the National Security Council Directorate on Global Health Security and Biodefense – more commonly known as the White House Pandemic Office – in collaboration with the Department of Health and Human Services (HHS). The White House Pandemic Office had previously reinstated Dr. Beth Cameron to the executive position. The HHS is overseen by Secretary of Health and Human Services Xavier Becerra.

As of June 29, HHS has received requests from 32 states and jurisdictions, deploying over 9,000 doses of JYNNEOS vaccine and 300 courses of ST-246 (tecovirimat) antiviral smallpox treatments. The United States expanded deployment of JYNNEOS vaccines, allocating 296,000 doses over the coming weeks, 56,000 of which will be allocated immediately. Over the coming months a combined 2.5 million additional doses will become available. As of November 2022, New York state ended its state of emergency, mobile mass vaccination sites set up since summer in New York city closed, but vaccinations were moved to outpatient and sexual health clinics.

=== Precautionary measures ===
Hospitals have begun making their own preparations to help control the current mpox outbreak, including screening patients, increasing decontamination and cleaning procedures, and wearing appropriate safety gear when interacting with infected patients.

== See also ==
- 2003 Midwest monkeypox outbreak
- 2022–2023 mpox outbreak in Brazil
- 2022–2023 mpox outbreak in Canada
- 2022–2023 mpox outbreak in India
- 2022–2023 mpox outbreak in Japan
- 2022–2023 mpox outbreak in New York (state)
- COVID-19 pandemic in the United States
- Smallpox vaccine
- Timeline of the 2022–2023 mpox outbreak
