= 2022–2023 mpox outbreak in Japan =

Outbreak of mpox in Japan

- Disease: Human mpox
- Location: Japan
- Arrival date: 25 July 2022 – ongoing (3 years, 9 months, and 24 days)
- Date: 25 July 2022
- Confirmed cases: 248
- Deaths: 1

The 2022–2023 mpox outbreak in Japan is a part of the larger outbreak of human mpox caused by the West African clade of the monkeypox virus. According to the Ministry of Health, Japan's first mpox case was reported in Tokyo on 25 July 2022.

== Background ==
Mpox (/ˈɛmpɒks/, EM-poks; originally known as monkeypox) is an infectious viral disease that can occur in humans and other animals. Symptoms include a rash that forms blisters and then crusts over, as well as fever and swollen lymph nodes. The illness is usually mild, and most infected individuals recover within a few weeks without treatment. The time from exposure to the onset of symptoms ranges from three to seventeen days, and symptoms typically last from two to four weeks. However, cases may be severe, especially in children, pregnant women, or people with suppressed immune systems.

The disease is caused by the monkeypox virus, a zoonotic virus in the genus Orthopoxvirus. The variola virus, which causes smallpox, is also in this genus. Human-to-human transmission can occur through direct contact with infected skin or body fluids, including sexual contact. People remain infectious from the onset of symptoms until all the lesions have scabbed and healed. The virus may spread from infected animals through handling infected meat or via bites or scratches. Diagnosis can be confirmed by polymerase chain reaction (PCR) testing a lesion for the virus's DNA.

Vaccination is recommended for those at high risk of infection. No vaccine has been developed specifically against mpox, but smallpox vaccines have been found to be effective. There is no specific treatment for the disease, so the aim of treatment is to manage the symptoms and prevent complications. Antiviral drugs such as tecovirimat can be used to treat mpox, although their effectiveness has not been proven.

An ongoing outbreak of mpox was confirmed on 6 May 2022, beginning with a British resident who, after travelling to Nigeria (where the disease is endemic), presented symptoms consistent with mpox on 29 April 2022. The resident returned to the United Kingdom on 4 May, creating the country's index case of the outbreak. The origin of several of the cases of mpox in the United Kingdom is unknown. Some monitors saw community transmission taking place in the London area as of mid-May, but it has been suggested that cases were already spreading in Europe in the previous months.

== Timeline ==
The first known case of the mpox outbreak in Japan was detected on 25 July 2022. According to the Ministry of Health, the index case was a man in his 30s who had recently traveled to Europe, and he had contact with someone who was later diagnosed with mpox. On 28 July 2022, Japan confirmed its second case of mpox, from a man in his 30s in Tokyo and he had recently traveled abroad. It was officially said one victim had no contact with the other victim.
