= Mpox in Nigeria =

- Disease: Mpox
- Pathogen: Monkeypox virus
- First reported: 1971

Mpox, formerly known as monkeypox, is an infectious viral disease that has been endemic in West and Central Africa, including Nigeria, for decades. The disease in Nigeria is caused by the clade 2 mpox virus. Nigeria has a long history with mpox, with the first human case identified in 1971. After an intermittent period of no reported cases, the disease re-emerged in 2017 and has since seen a progressive increase in frequency and geographic distribution, becoming a significant public health concern. The 2022 global outbreak of mpox, which spread to numerous non-endemic countries, has been linked to a strain that emerged and circulated in Nigeria for years prior.

Challenges in Nigeria's response include limited access to diagnostics, therapeutics, and vaccines, as well as issues with public awareness and surveillance. Efforts are being made by Nigerian health authorities and international partners to strengthen the country's capacity to prevent, detect, and respond to mpox outbreaks.

== History ==
=== Origins ===
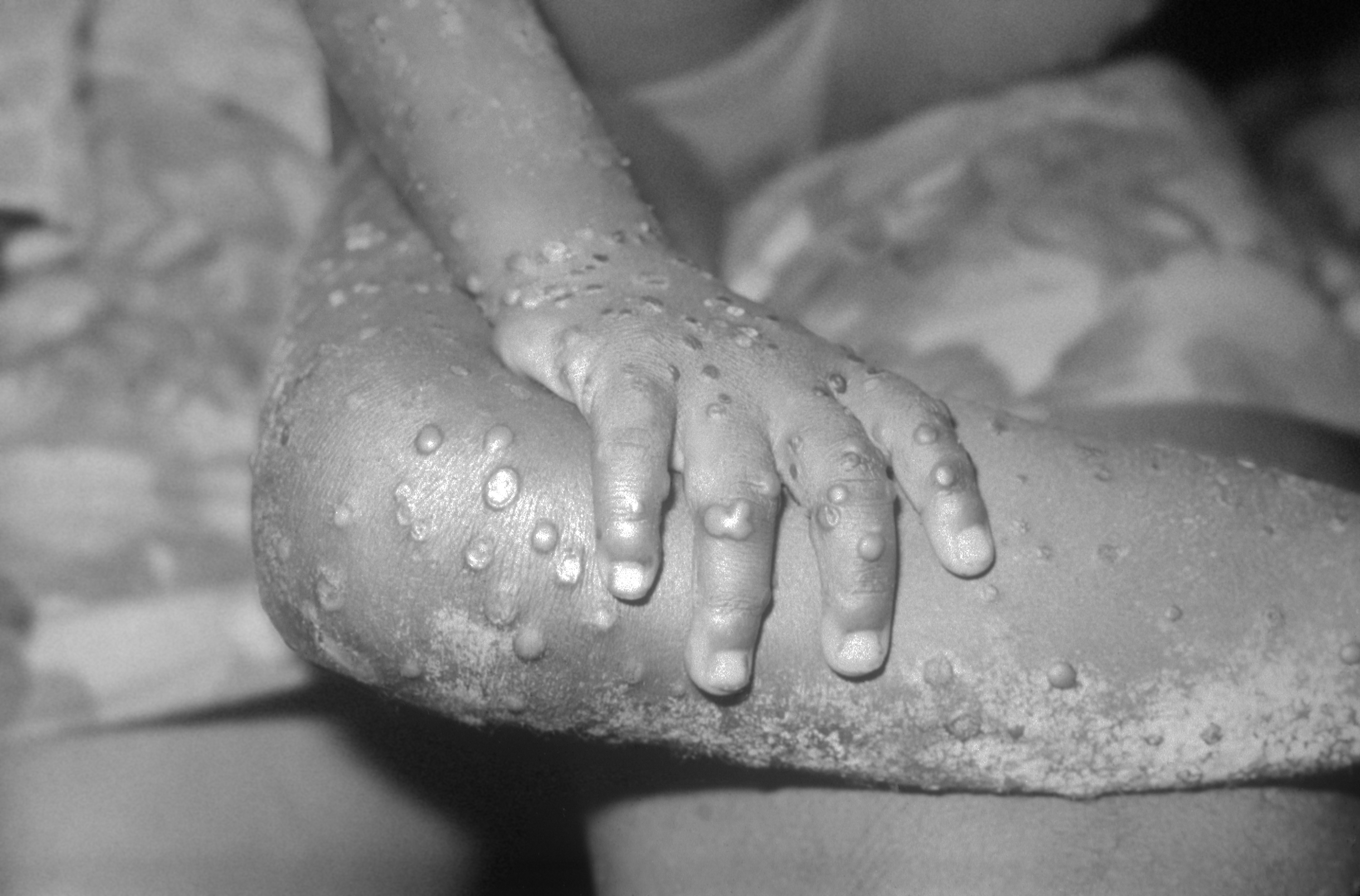
Mpox in 1971

When the first cases of human mpox were identified in the Democratic Republic of Congo, Liberia and Sierre Leone in 1970, there were no detected cases in Nigeria, and surveillance of several non-human primates in Nigeria did not identify any monkeypox virus. Two cases of human mpox infections were identified in Nigeria in 1971. The first human case of mpox in Nigeria was confirmed on 4 April in a 4-year-old girl in Ihie-Imuduru village in Abia State. This case was significant, as her mother's subsequent infection was reported as the first suspected human-to-human transmission of mpox in history. After 1971, only a few sporadic cases were reported, with the third case diagnosed in November 1978 in Oyo State.

=== Re-emergence ===
In 2017, the disease reemerged in humans in Nigeria after 39 years. By the end of 2017, there were at least 115 confirmed cases. The first exportations of mpox out of Africa via affected humans occurred in September 2018, when three unrelated affected people from Nigeria travelled to the UK and Israel. In May 2019, a 38-year-old man who travelled from Nigeria was hospitalised in an isolation ward at the National Centre for Infectious Diseases in Singapore, after being confirmed as Singapore's first detected case of mpox. The case was suspected to have been linked to a simultaneous outbreak in Nigeria. In 2021, cases of mpox were reported in various regions of Nigeria. Between 2017 and 2021, Nigeria reported 226 laboratory-confirmed cases and eight deaths, with a case fatality rate of 3.5%. Genomic studies have since revealed that the clade 2 mpox virus that caused the 2022 global outbreak had been circulating in Nigeria for approximately eight years prior, emerging in southern Nigeria in August 2014.

== Health response ==
Nigeria's public health response to mpox has involved the Nigeria Centre for Disease Control and Prevention (NCDC), in collaboration with national and international partners. The NCDC has been instrumental in surveillance, public health education, and response strategies. The Emergency Use Authorization (EUA) of the JYNNEOS vaccine by the National Agency for Food and Drug Administration and Control (NAFDAC) was granted in August 2023, which was extended in July 2024. This authorization leveraged assessments from international regulatory bodies.

However, Nigeria faces several challenges in combating mpox such as limited access to quality healthcare, diverse healthcare-seeking practices, inadequate public awareness and misconceptions, inadequate vaccine and therapeutic availability, and weak epidemic surveillance systems. Global narratives about mpox, particularly those associating it with certain groups, have led to fear and misinformation, deterring some individuals from seeking care in public health facilities due to fear of stigma.
