= Tecovirimat =

Antiviral medication

Clinical data
- Trade names: Tpoxx
- Other names: ST-246
- AHFS/Drugs.com: Monograph
- License data: US DailyMed: Tecovirimat
- Routes of administration: By mouth, intravenous
- ATC code: J05AX24 (WHO)

Legal status
- Legal status: CA: ℞-only; US: ℞-only; EU: Rx-only

Identifiers
- IUPAC name: N-[(1R,2R,6S,7S,8S,10R)-3,5-Dioxo-4-azatetracyclo[5.3.2.0^{2,6}.0^{8,10}]dodec-11-en-4-yl]-4-(trifluoromethyl)benzamide
- CAS Number: 869572-92-9
- PubChem CID: 16124688
- DrugBank: DB12020
- ChemSpider: 17281586
- UNII: F925RR824R
- KEGG: D09390; as monohydrate: D11557
- ChEMBL: ChEMBL1257073

Chemical and physical data
- Formula: C_{19}H_{15}F_{3}N_{2}O_{3}
- Molar mass: 376.335 g·mol^{−1}
- 3D model (JSmol): Interactive image
- SMILES: FC(F)(F)c1ccc(cc1)C(=O)NN1C(=O)C2C(C3C=CC2C2CC32)C1=O
- InChI: InChI=1S/C19H15F3N2O3/c20-19(21,22)9-3-1-8(2-4-9)16(25)23-24-17(26)14-10-5-6-11(13-7-12(10)13)15(14)18(24)27/h1-6,10-15H,7H2,(H,23,25); Key:CSKDFZIMJXRJGH-UHFFFAOYSA-N

Tecovirimat, sold under the brand name Tpoxx among others, is an antiviral medication with activity against orthopoxviruses such as smallpox and mpox. In 2018 it was the first antipoxviral drug approved in the United States.

The drug works by blocking cellular transmission of orthopoxviruses, thus preventing disease.

Tecovirimat has been effective in laboratory testing; it has been shown to protect animals from mpox and rabbitpox and causes no serious side effects in humans. Tecovirimat was first used for treatment in December 2018, after a laboratory-acquired vaccinia virus infection.

As of 2014 two million doses of tecovirimat were stockpiled in the US Strategic National Stockpile should an orthopoxvirus-based bioterror attack occur. The U.S. Food and Drug Administration (FDA) considers it to be a first-in-class medication.

== Medical uses ==
In the United States, tecovirimat is indicated for the treatment of human smallpox disease.

In the European Union it is indicated for the treatment of smallpox, mpox, and cowpox. Tecovirimat can be taken by mouth and should be taken with a fatty meal. While tecovirimat did not show efficacy against mpox in monotherapy in clinical setting, in vitro assays showed strong inhibition of both vaccinia and mpox in combination therapies.

== Mechanism of action ==
Tecovirimat inhibits the function of orthopoxvirus VP37 envelope wrapping protein, a major envelope protein required for the production of extracellular virus. Tecovirimat acts as a molecular glue that promotes the dimerization of VP37. The drug prevents the virus from leaving an infected cell, hindering the spread of the virus within the body.

Antimicrobial resistance to tecovirimat was described in vitro in cowpox virus during treatment already in 2005, prior to licensure. Since the global 2022–2023 mpox outbreak, resistance has been described with long treatment courses among severely immunocompromised persons, but also in people without prior treatment, suggesting human-to-human transmission. Tecovirimat resistance mutations identified in clinical MPXV isolates map to the VP37 dimer interface and prevent drug-induced dimerization.

== Chemistry ==
The first synthesis of tecovirimat was published in a patent filed by scientists at SIGA Technologies in 2004. It is made in two steps from cycloheptatriene.

A Diels–Alder reaction of cycloheptatriene with maleic anhydride forms the main ring system and then in the second step a reaction with 4-trifluormethylbenzhydrazide gives the cyclic imide of the drug.

== History ==
Originally researched by the National Institute of Allergy and Infectious Diseases, the drug was owned by Viropharma and discovered in collaboration with scientists at the United States Army Medical Research Institute of Infectious Diseases. It is owned and manufactured by SIGA Technologies. SIGA and Viropharma were issued a patent for tecovirimat in 2012.

=== Clinical trials ===
As of 2009, the results of clinical trials supported its use against smallpox and other related orthopoxviruses. It showed potential for a variety of uses including preventive healthcare, as a post-exposure therapeutic, as a therapeutic, and an adjunct to vaccination.

As of 2008, it was permitted for phase II trials by the U.S. Food and Drug Administration (FDA). In phase I trials, tecovirimat was generally well tolerated with no serious adverse events. Due to its importance for biodefense, the FDA designated tecovirimat for fast-track status, creating a path for expedited FDA review and eventual regulatory approval. In July 2018, the FDA approved tecovirimat for the treatment of smallpox. the first antipoxviral drug approved in the United States. In August 2022, the AIDS Clinical Trials Group (ACTG) began a randomized, placebo-controlled, double-blinded trial on the safety and efficacy of tecovirimat for mpox, known as STOMP (Study of Tecovirimat for Human mpox Virus), aiming to enroll at least 500 participants with acute mpox infection.

== Society and culture ==
=== Legal status ===
In November 2021, the Committee for Medicinal Products for Human Use of the European Medicines Agency recommended to grant SIGA Technologies Netherlands B.V a marketing authorization under exceptional circumstances for tecovirimat, intended to treat orthopoxvirus disease (smallpox, mpox, cowpox, and vaccinia complications) in adults and in children who weigh at least 13 kilograms (29 lb) Tecovirimat was approved for medical use in the European Union in January 2022.

In December 2021, Health Canada approved oral tecovirimat for the treatment of smallpox in people weighing at least 13 kilograms (29 lb).

As of August 2022, Tpoxx was available in the US only through the Strategic National Stockpile as a Centers for Disease Control and Prevention investigational new drug. As of 2022, intravenous Tpoxx had no lower weight cap and can be used in infants under the investigational new drug protocol.

As of 2024, tecovirimat use in the US outside of a clinical trial should adhere to the CDC Investigational New Drug protocol in order to prevent mutations and to include surveillance to prevent spread of resistant virus.
