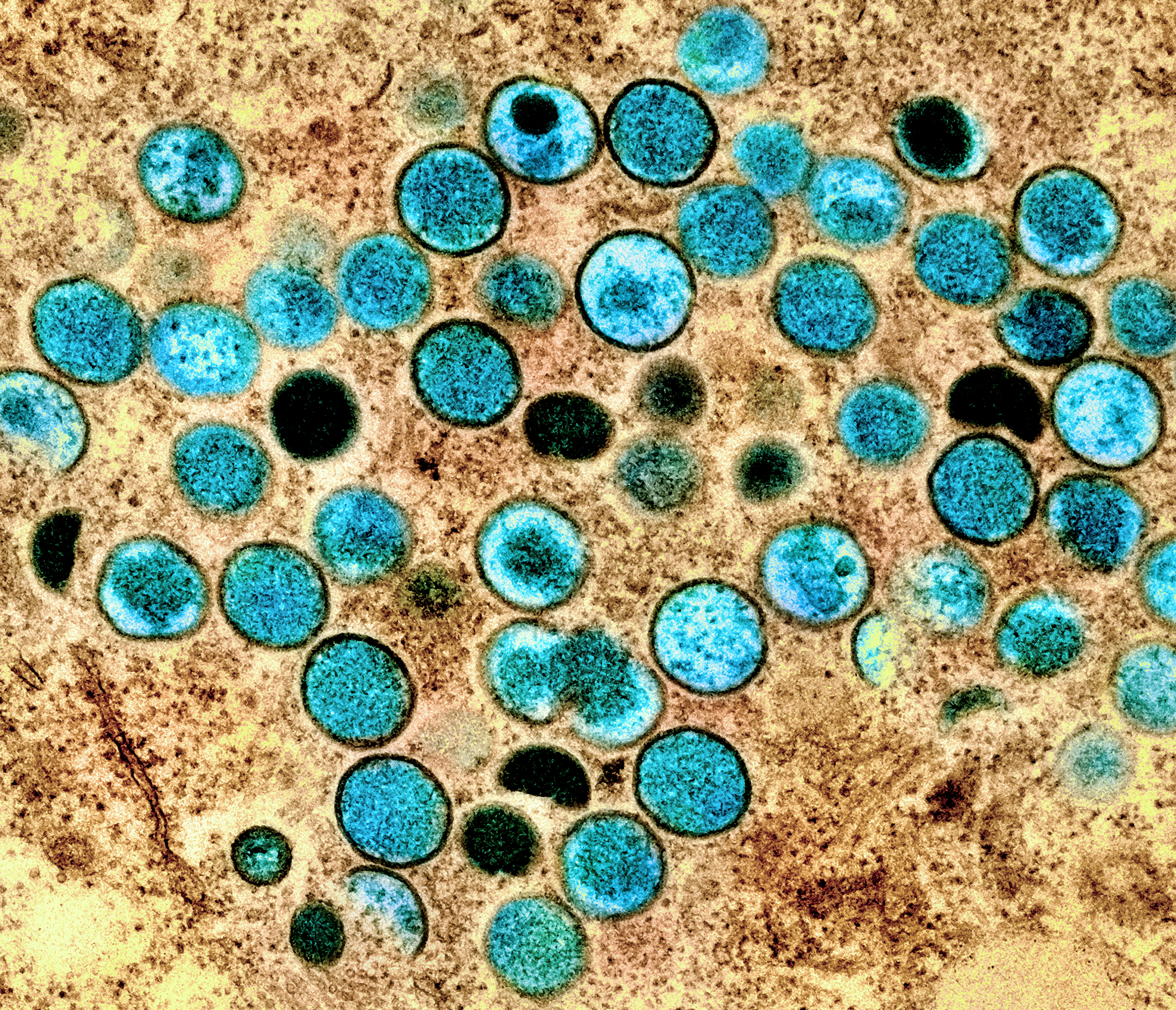
- Colorized transmission electron micrograph of monkeypox virus particles (teal) found within an infected cell (brown), cultured in the laboratory.

Virus classification
- (unranked): Virus
- Realm: Varidnaviria
- Kingdom: Bamfordvirae
- Phylum: Nucleocytoviricota
- Class: Pokkesviricetes
- Order: Chitovirales
- Family: Poxviridae
- Genus: Orthopoxvirus
- Species: Orthopoxvirus monkeypox

Clades
- Clade I; Clade Ia; Clade Ib; Clade II; Clade IIa; Clade IIb

Synonyms
- MPV, MPXV, hMPXV

= Monkeypox virus =

Orthopoxvirus monkeypox

Species of double-stranded DNA virus

The monkeypox virus (MPV, MPXV, or hMPXV) (Note: The World Health Organization (the authority on disease names) announced the new name "mpox" in November 2022. However, virus naming is the responsibility of the International Committee on the Taxonomy of Viruses (ICTV). In June 2024, the official species name of the virus was updated from Monkeypox virus to Orthopoxvirus monkeypox as part of this update.) is a species of double-stranded DNA viruses that causes mpox disease in humans and other mammals. It is a zoonotic virus belonging to the Orthopoxvirus genus, making it closely related to the variola, cowpox, and vaccinia viruses. MPV is oval, with a lipoprotein outer membrane. Its genome is approximately 190 kb. Smallpox and monkeypox viruses are both orthopoxviruses, and the smallpox vaccine is effective against mpox if given within 3–5 years before the disease is contracted. Symptoms of mpox in humans include a rash that forms blisters and then crusts over, fever, and swollen lymph nodes. The virus is transmissible between animals and humans by direct contact to the lesions or via bodily fluids.

The virus was given the name monkeypox virus after being isolated from monkeys, but most of the carriers of this virus are smaller mammals.

The virus is endemic in Central Africa, where infections in humans are relatively frequent. Though there are many natural hosts for the monkeypox virus, the exact reservoirs and how the virus is circulated in nature needs to be studied further.

== Virology ==
=== Classification ===
The monkeypox virus is a zoonotic virus belonging to the genus Orthopoxvirus, which itself is a member of the family Poxviridae (also known as the poxvirus family). Of note, the Orthopoxvirus genus includes the variola virus that prior to eradication via the advent of the smallpox vaccine, was the cause of the infectious human disease known as smallpox. Members of the poxvirus family, include the monkeypox virus itself have been listed by the WHO as diseases with epidemic or pandemic potential. The monkeypox virus is listed as being a potentially high or severe threat pathogen in both the European Union (EU) and the United States of America.

There are two subtypes or clades, clade I historically associated with the Congo Basin and clade II historically associated with West Africa. A global outbreak during 2022–2023 was caused by clade II.

MPV is 96.3% identical to the variola virus in regards to its coding region, but it does differ in parts of the genome which encode for virulence and host range. Through phylogenetic analysis, it was found that MPV is not a direct descendant of the variola virus.

=== Structure and genome ===
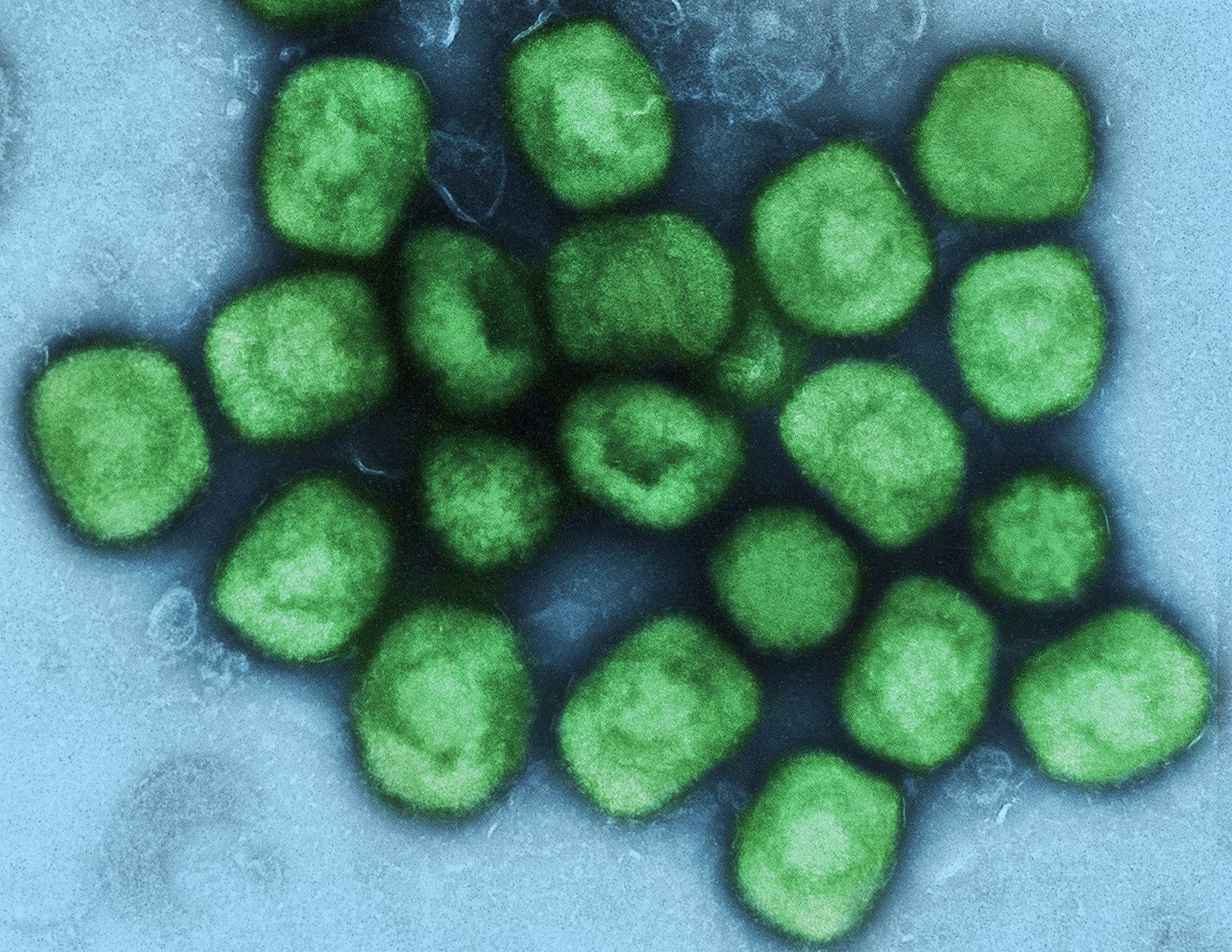
Colorized transmission electron micrograph of monkeypox virus particles (green)

The monkeypox virus, like other poxviruses, is oval, with a lipoprotein outer membrane. The outer membrane protects the enzymes, DNA, and transcription factors of the virus. Typical DNA viruses replicate and express their genome in the nucleus of eukaryotic cells, relying heavily on the host cell's machinery. However, monkeypox viruses rely mostly on proteins encoded in their genome that allow them to replicate in the cytoplasm.

The genome of the monkeypox virus comprises 200 kb of double-stranded DNA coding for 191 proteins. Similar to other poxviruses, the virions of monkey pox have large oval envelopes. Within each virion, there is a core which holds the genome, along with the enzymes that assist in dissolving the protein coat and replication. The center of the genome codes for genes involved in key functions such as viral transcription and assembly; genes located on the extremities of the viral genome are associated more with interactions between the virus and the host cell, such as spike protein characteristics.

Monkeypox virus is relatively large, compared to other viruses. This makes it harder for the virus to breach the host defences, such as crossing gap junctions. Furthermore, the large size makes it harder for the virus to replicate quickly and evade immune response. To evade host immune systems, and buy more time for replication, monkeypox and other orthopox viruses have evolved mechanisms to evade host immune cells.

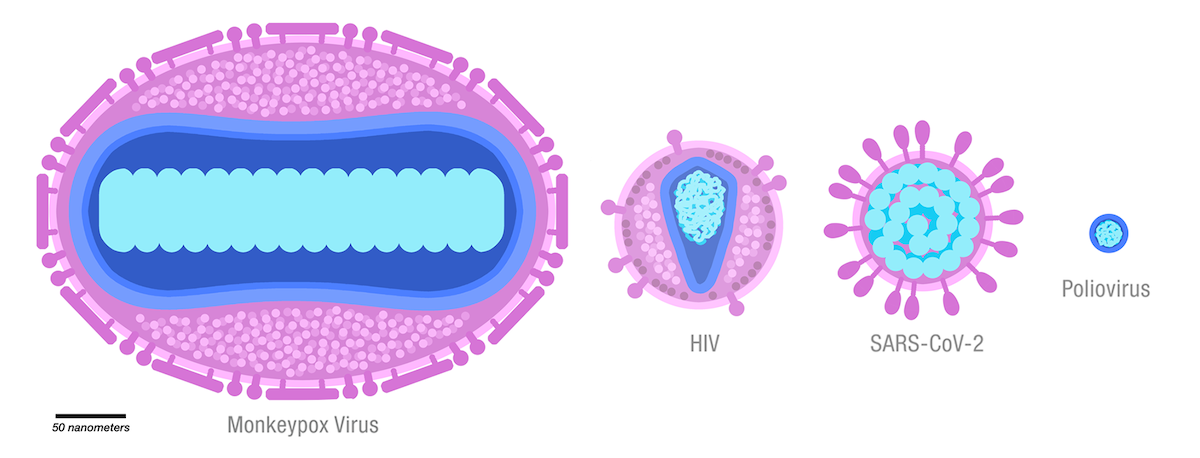
Monkeypox virus size and structure in comparison to HIV, SARS-COV-2 and Poliovirus. Membranes and membrane-bound proteins are in purple, capsids are in dark blue, and genomes and nucleoid-associated proteins are in turquoise.

=== Replication and life cycle ===
As an Orthopoxvirus, MPV replication occurs entirely in the cell cytoplasm within 'factories' – created from the host rough endoplasmic reticulum (ER) – where viral mRNA transcription and translation also take place. The factories are also where DNA replication, gene expression, and assembly of mature virions (MV) are located.

MPV virions (MVs) are able to bind to the cell surface with the help of viral proteins. Virus entry into the host cell plasma membrane is dependent on a neutral pH, otherwise entry occurs via a low-pH dependent endocytic route. The MV of the monkeypox virus has an Entry Fusion Complex (EFC), allowing it to enter the host cell after attachment.

The viral mRNA is translated into structural virion protein by the host ribosomes. Gene expression begins when MPV releases viral proteins and enzymatic factors that disable the cell. Mature virions are infectious. However, they will stay inside the cell until they are transported from the factories to the Golgi/endosomal compartment. Protein synthesis allows for the ER membrane of the factory to dismantle, while small lipid-bilayer membranes will appear to encapsulate the genomes of new virions, now extracellular viruses (EVs). The VPS52 and VPS54 genes of the GARP complex, which is important for transport, are necessary for wrapping the virus, and formation of EVs. DNA concatemers process the genomes, which appear in new virions, along with other enzymes, and genetic information needed for the replication cycle to occur. EVs are necessary for the spread of the virus from cell-to-cell and its long-distance spread.

== Transmission ==
=== Animal to human ===
Zoonotic transmission can occur from direct contact with the blood, bodily fluids, wounds, or mucosal lesions of infected animals whether they are dead or alive. The virus is thought to have originated in Africa where the virus has been observed in multiple animals, including rope squirrels, tree squirrels, Gambian pouched rats, dormice, and different species of monkeys. Though the natural reservoir of the monkeypox virus has not yet been established, rodents are speculated to be the most likely reservoir. Eating meat that has not been properly cooked and consuming other products of infected animals proves to be a major risk factor in the spread of infection.

=== Human to human ===
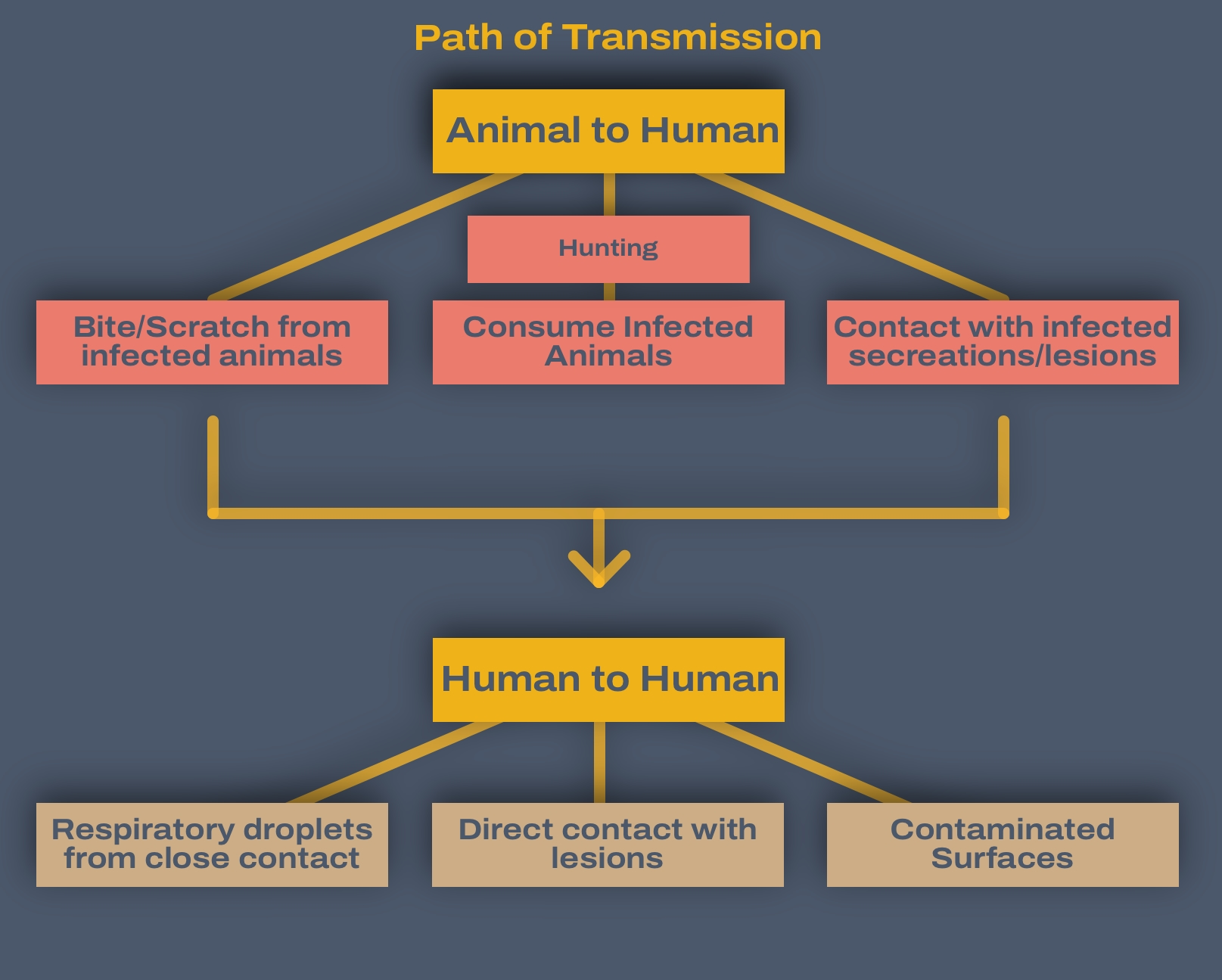
Transmission scheme of the monkeypox virus

Monkeypox virus can be transmitted from one person to another through contact with infectious lesion material or fluid on the skin, in the mouth or on the genitals; this includes touching, close contact and during sex. It may also spread by means of respiratory droplets from talking, coughing or sneezing. During the 2022-2023 outbreak, transmission between people was mostly via sexual contact. Among cases with available demographic and epidemiological information, 96% of those affected were men, with 87% reporting male to male sexual contact. There is a lower risk of infection from fomites (objects which can become infectious after being touched by an infected person) such as clothing or bedding, but precautions should be taken.

The virus then enters the body through broken skin, or mucosal surfaces such as the mouth, respiratory tract, or genitals.

=== Human to animal ===
There are two recorded instances of human to animal transmission. Both occurred during the 2022–2023 global mpox outbreak. In both cases, the owners of a pet dog first became infected with mpox and transmitted the infection to the pet.

== Mpox disease ==
=== Human ===
Initial symptoms of mpox infection are fever, muscle pains, and sore throat, followed by an itchy or painful rash, headache, swollen lymph nodes, and fatigue. Not everyone will exhibit the complete range of symptoms.

People with mpox usually become symptomatic about a week after infection. However the incubation period can vary in a range between one day and four weeks.

=== Animal ===
It is thought that small mammals provide a reservoir for the virus in endemic areas. Spread among animals occurs via the fecal–oral route and through the nose, through wounds and eating infected meat. The disease has also been reported in a wide range of other animals, including monkeys, anteaters, hedgehogs, prairie dogs, squirrels, and shrews. Signs and symptoms in animals are not well researched and further studies are in progress.

=== Vaccine ===
Historically, smallpox vaccine had been reported to reduce the risk of mpox among previously vaccinated people in Africa. The decrease in immunity to poxviruses in exposed populations is a factor in the increasing prevalence of human mpox. It is attributed to waning cross-protective immunity among those vaccinated before 1980, when mass smallpox vaccinations were discontinued, and to the gradually increasing unvaccinated proportion of the population.

As of August 2024, there are four vaccines in use to prevent mpox, all originally developed against smallpox.

- MVA-BN (marketed as Jynneos, Imvamune or Imvanex) manufactured by Bavarian Nordic. Licensed for use against mpox in Europe, United States and Canada.
- LC16 from KMB Biologics (Japan) – licensed for use in Japan.
- OrthopoxVac, licensed for use in Russia and manufactured by the State Research Center of Virology and Biotechnology (VECTOR) in Russia
- ACAM2000, manufactured by Emergent BioSolutions. Approved for use against mpox in the United States as of August 2024.

The MVA-BN and ACAM 2000 vaccines both contain vaccinia virus. Vaccinia is a less virulent orthopoxvirus than either monkeypox virus or variola virus (the causative agent of smallpox), and owing to a high level of protein identity among orthopoxviruses, the two vaccinia virus vaccines elicit antibodies that provide cross-protection against other orthopoxviruses such as monkeypox virus. Because the vaccinia virus in the MVA-BN vaccine cannot replicate, it is recommended over ACAM2000 in the United States for use by people who are either considered at high risk of exposure to mpox, or who may have recently been exposed to it.

The United States Centers for Disease Control and Prevention (CDC) recommends that people investigating mpox outbreaks, those caring for infected individuals or animals, and those exposed by close or intimate contact with infected individuals or animals should receive a vaccination. The CDC and the EMA recommend the use of a 2-dose MVA-BN vaccination series for adults who are considered at risk for becoming infected with mpox through sexual activity.

=== Other measures ===
The CDC has made detailed recommendations in addition to the standard precautions for infection control. These include that healthcare providers wear a gown, mask, goggles, and a disposable filtering respirator (such as an N95), and that an infected person should be isolated a private room to keep others from possible contact.

Those living in countries where mpox is endemic should avoid contact with sick mammals such as rodents, marsupials, non-human primates (dead or alive) that could harbour Orthopoxvirus monkeypox and should refrain from eating or handling wild game (bush meat).

During the 2022–2023 outbreak, several public health authorities launched public awareness campaigns in order to reduce spread of the disease.

=== Treatment ===
Most cases of mpox present with mild symptoms and there is complete recovery within 2 to 4 weeks. There is no specific treatment for the disease, although antivirals such as tecovirimat have been approved for the treatment of severe mpox. A 2023 Cochrane review found no completed randomized controlled trials studying therapeutics for the treatment of mpox. The review identified non-randomized controlled trials which evaluated the safety of therapeutics for mpox, finding no significant risks from tecovirimat and low certainty evidence that suggests brincidofovir may cause mild liver injury. Pain is common and may be severe; supportive care such as pain or fever control may be administered. People with mild disease should isolate at home, stay hydrated, eat well, and take steps to maintain their mental health.

== Immune system interaction ==
Pox viruses have mechanisms to evade the hosts' innate and adaptive immune systems. Viral proteins, expressed by infected cells, employ multiple approaches to limit immune system activity, including binding to, and preventing activation of proteins within the host's immune system, and preventing infected cells from dying to enable them to continue replicating the monkey pox virus.

== Variants and clades ==
The virus is subclassified into two clades, clade I and clade II. At the protein level, the clades share 170 orthologs, and their transcriptional regulatory sequences show no significant differences. Both clades have 53 common virulence genes, which contain different types of amino acid changes. 121 of the amino acid changes in the virulence genes are silent, while 61 are conservative, and 93 are non-conservative.

Historically, the case fatality rate (CFR) of past outbreaks was estimated at between 1% and 10%, with clade I considered to be more severe than clade II. The CFR of the 2022-2023 global outbreak (caused by clade IIb) has been very low - estimated at 0.16%, with the majority of deaths in individuals who were already immunocompromised.

Clades and subclades of Orthopoxvirus monkeypox
| Name | | Former names | Nations |
|---|---|---|---|
| Clade I | Clade Ia | Congo Basin Central African | Cameroon; Central African Republic; Democratic Republic of the Congo; Gabon; Republic of the Congo; South Sudan |
| Clade I | Clade Ib | Congo Basin Central African | Democratic Republic of the Congo; Burundi; Other nations affected, see 2023–2026 mpox epidemic |
| Clade II | Clade IIa | West African | Benin; Cameroon; Cote d'Ivoire; Liberia; Nigeria; Sierra Leone |
| Clade II | Clade IIb | West African | Widespread globally - See 2022–2023 mpox outbreak § Cases per country and territory |

== History ==
A map of the spread of the monkeypox virus globally. Endemic clade II Endemic clade I Both clades recorded Clade IIb outbreak in 2022–2023

Monkeypox virus was first identified by Preben von Magnus in Copenhagen, Denmark, in 1958 in crab-eating macaque monkeys (Macaca fascicularis) being used as laboratory animals. The virus was originally given the name monkeypox virus because it had been isolated from monkeys; subsequent research reveals that monkeys are not the main host. Other small mammals in the tropical forests of Central and West Africa are suspected to form a natural reservoir.

The first human infection was diagnosed 1970, in the Democratic Republic of Congo. Small viral outbreaks with secondary human-to-human infection occur routinely in endemic areas of Central Africa; the primary route of infection is thought to be contact with the infected animals or their bodily fluids. The first reported outbreak in humans outside of Africa occurred in 2003 in the United States; it was traced to Gambian pouched rats which had been imported as exotic pets. There have subsequently been a number of outbreaks to regions outside of the endemic areas in Central Africa, and 2 public health emergencies of international concern, the 2022–2023 mpox outbreak and the 2023–2026 mpox epidemic. In August 2024, it was reported that the UAE will donate Monkeypox vaccines to the Democratic Republic of Congo, Nigeria, South Africa, Ivory Coast, and Cameroon.
