= Timeline of the 2022–2023 mpox outbreak =

Major events in the 2022 monkeypox outbreak

Cumulative confirmed cases in the ongoing mpox outbreak

This article documents the chronology and epidemiology of the 2022–2023 mpox outbreak.

== May 2022 ==
In the beginning of May 2022, a case of mpox was reported in a British resident who had travelled to Lagos and Delta State in Nigeria, in areas where mpox is considered to be an endemic disease. The person developed a rash on 29 April while in Nigeria and flew back to the United Kingdom, arriving on 4 May, and presented to hospital later the same day. Mpox infection was immediately suspected, and the patient was hospitalised at Guy's Hospital and isolated, then tested positive for the virus on 6 May.

On 12 May two new cases of mpox were confirmed by the UK Health Security Agency (UKHSA), both in London, living together in the same household, with no known link between either of them and either the index case or travel to endemic regions. One of the new cases was hospitalised at St Mary's Hospital, while the other case with milder symptoms was said to be self-isolating at home.

On 17 May, another four cases of mpox were confirmed by the UKHSA in three Londoners and a person in North East England who had previously travelled to London.

On 18 May in Portugal, 14 cases of mpox were reported by health authorities out of total of 29 suspected cases. Two samples' test results were pending. In Spain, there are seven confirmed cases as of 18 May. On the same day, the United States confirmed its first 2022 case of mpox while Canada reported 13 suspected cases.

On 19 May, Sweden and Belgium reported their first cases of mpox, while Italy confirmed its first case in a traveller who had arrived from the Canary Islands. A suspected case was reported in France. A genomic analysis conducted on a case in Portugal places the virus infecting that patient in the West African clade, finding it most closely related to viruses associated with cases exported from Nigeria in 2018 and 2019. Current sequencing error prevents exact placement of the virus within the group of these Nigerian viruses.

Following the detection of a case in Massachusetts the previous day, the United States on 19 May placed a $119 million order with Bavarian Nordic with the option to buy $180 million's worth more, for up to 13 million vaccines against smallpox. On 20 May, the US Department of Health and Human Services said the order was part of a standard preparedness effort and not a response to recent events. A spokesperson said, "BARDA has worked with industry to develop and purchase vaccines and treatments for a potential smallpox emergency, some of which may also be used to respond to mpox." Separately, Bavarian Nordic stated an unidentified European country had placed an order for "Imvanex" vaccines in response to the mpox outbreak.

On 20 May, Health Secretary of the UK Sajid Javid reported that another eleven cases had been confirmed, bringing the total in the country to twenty. UKHSA reported on 27 May that a majority of cases are in men who have sex with men. On the same day, Australia reported its first suspected case, in a man who fell ill after returning from travel in the UK. A second case was also confirmed on the same day. The cases were identified as being in Melbourne and Sydney. Both recently returned from travel in Europe and the UK. Germany, France and the Netherlands confirmed their first cases on the same day. The three confirmed cases in Belgium were linked to the Darklands fetish festival in Antwerp. Also on 20 May, Belgium became the first country to introduce a mandatory quarantine for people infected with mpox (21 days). Close contacts of infected people do not have to self-isolate, but are told to stay vigilant. In addition, Health Secretary of the UK Sajid Javid also reported that another eleven cases had been confirmed, bringing the total in the country to twenty. Dr Susan Hopkins from the UKHSA urged watchfulness among men who have sex with men, who have made up "a notable proportion" of the recent cases in the UK and Europe. The UK Health Security Agency (UKHSA) advised people who have had close contact with a person infected with mpox to self-isolate for 21 days. Self-isolation is not mandatory.

On 21 May, Switzerland and Israel confirmed their first cases. Spain reported 23 new cases linked to a gay bathhouse in Madrid, bringing the country's total to 30. Several infections may also be linked to the Maspalomas Gay Pride Festival in Gran Canaria. On the same date, Norwegian authorities initiated contact tracing after a person who had visited Norway earlier in the month had tested positive back in his home country (an undisclosed European country). A suspected case was reported in Greece, but it was later confirmed to be chickenpox.

On 22 May, Austria confirmed its first case.

On 23 May, Denmark reported its first case in a man who had returned home from the Canary Islands, and the following day the second case was confirmed in a person that also had returned home from Spain. Dr. Sue Hopkins, the chief medical adviser for the UK Health Security Agency, announced that 37 new mpox cases had been confirmed, more than doubling the total confirmed in the UK to 57 cases. In Canada, Quebec announced a total of 15 confirmed cases in the province.

On 24 May, the Czech Republic confirmed its first case, a woman who was at a music festival in Belgium at the beginning of May. On the same day, United Arab Emirates reported its first case, detected in a 29-year-old female visitor from West Africa. Also on that day, Slovenia confirmed its first case, a man from Canary Islands, while Switzerland reported its second case, a woman in the Canton of Geneva. The UK reported 14 more cases, taking the total to 71, including its first case in Scotland. In total mpox has been confirmed in 19 countries.

On 25 May, Portugal reported an additional 10 confirmed cases. The UKHSA reported 7 additional cases in England, to a total of 78 cases in the UK.

On 26 May, Public Health Wales and the Public Health Agency of Northern Ireland each reported one case, which, coupled with English and Scottish cases, brought the UK total to 90. On the same day, Quebec reported a suspected case in a child of school age, in the Montreal area. Meanwhile, in the United States, an adult woman with a recent travel history to Africa became Virginia's first mpox case.

On May 27, some countries began to use smallpox vaccines to protect people exposed to the monkeypox virus. 500 people in Montreal, Quebec, Canada received smallpox vaccinations. "We're vaccinating in a very targeted way. So we vaccinated people that had high-risk exposure in the last 14 days," said Dr. Genevieve Bergeron, Montreal's medical officer responsible for health emergencies and infectious diseases." at the CIUSSS du Centre-Sud-de-l'Île-de-Montréal. 800 Montrealers so far who have lined up at the clinic in the heart of the Gay Village that's been offering the vaccine since May 27. On the same day, Finland confirmed its first case. 16 additional cases were reported in England, to a total of 106 UK cases. Argentina reported two cases, in individuals who had both recently arrived from Spain.

On 28 May, Ireland reported its first case. The Health Service Executive (HSE) said the case was confirmed in the east of the country and the person had not been hospitalised, while a suspected case was also being investigated. On 30 May, a second case was confirmed in Ireland. On the same day, Malta also confirmed its first case in a 38-year-old male resident who was abroad in a country where the disease had been found. The man has light symptoms and does not require hospitalisation. Mexico also confirmed its first case, in a 50-year-old man in Mexico City, who is a resident in New York City and possibly contracted the illness in the Netherlands, according to the Mexican health authorities.

On 31 May, the first case in Norway was confirmed, an individual who had recently been traveling. Hungary also confirmed its first case, a 38-year-old male.

== June 2022 ==
On 1 and 2 June, four further cases were confirmed in the Republic of Ireland, totaling six.

On 2 June, Morocco reported its first case, citing its health ministry.

On 3 June, Latvia reported its first case, a patient under age 50 who was infected outside the country.

On 8 June, Brazil, Ghana and Greece reported cases of mpox. In Brazil, there had been at least 7 suspected cases, but none had been confirmed before this date. Five cases in Ghana were also confirmed by the Ghana Health Service. Greece detected its first case in a traveller, who had travelled to Portugal. On the same day, the total number of mpox infections outside of endemic countries reached 1,000.

On 10 June, Poland reported its first case of mpox; the Polish Ministry of Health stated that the case was imported, and the patient was not a Polish citizen, but did not disclose any further information.

On 12 June, Venezuela reported its first case of mpox. The case was identified to have been imported from Spain.

On 13 and 14 June, Romania reported its first cases of mpox. The first case, according to epidemiology, may have been imported from elsewhere in Europe.

On 15 June, Georgia and Luxembourg reported their first cases of mpox. The Georgian case was imported from Europe.

On 17 June, Chile and Serbia reported their first cases of mpox, and both cases were detected in their capitals, imported from western Europe.

On 22 June, South Korea reported its first mpox case.

On 23 June, Bulgaria, Colombia, Croatia and South Africa reported their first cases of mpox. The South African case is a 30-year-old male residing in the Gauteng province, which includes the executive capital, Pretoria.

On 24 June, three suspected cases of mpox were reported in Fiji. The Ministry of Health stated that one was a Fijian citizen and the other two were foreign individuals. All three cases returned negative results.

On 25 June, the WHO declared that the outbreak was not a global health emergency after considering the label.

== July 2022 ==
On 2 July, Andorra reported its first case of mpox.

On 5 July, Panama reported its first case of mpox.

On 6 July, the Dominican Republic, Ecuador and Jamaica reported their first cases of mpox.

On 7 July, Slovakia reported its first case of mpox.

On 9 July, New Zealand reported its first case of mpox.

On 12 July, New Zealand reported its second case of mpox.

On 14 July, India and Saudi Arabia reported their first cases of mpox.

On 21 July, Thailand reported its first mpox case.

On 23 July, the WHO declared the mpox outbreak a Public Health Emergency of International Concern.

On 25 July, Japan reported its first mpox case.

On 28 July, Japan reported its second mpox case.

On 29 July, Brazil and then Spain reported the first deaths from mpox outside of the endemic basin.

== August 2022 ==
On 2 August, New Zealand reported its third case of mpox. On the same day, Turkey reported four more mpox cases, one in isolation.

On 5 August, Japan reported its third mpox case.

On 10 August, Japan reported its fourth mpox case.

On 11 August, New Zealand reported its fourth mpox case.

== See also ==
- Timeline of the 2023–2025 mpox epidemic
- 2022–2023 mpox outbreak in Asia
- 2022–2023 mpox outbreak in Australia
- 2022–2023 mpox outbreak in Brazil
- 2022–2023 mpox outbreak in Canada
- 2022–2023 mpox outbreak in Europe
- 2022–2023 mpox outbreak in France
- 2022–2023 mpox outbreak in Germany
- 2022–2023 mpox outbreak in India
- 2022–2023 mpox outbreak in Italy
- 2022–2023 mpox outbreak in Japan
- 2022–2023 mpox outbreak in the Netherlands
- 2022–2023 mpox outbreak in North America
- 2022–2023 mpox outbreak in Portugal
- 2022–2023 mpox outbreak in South America
- 2022–2023 mpox outbreak in Spain
- 2022–2023 mpox outbreak in the United Kingdom
- 2022–2023 mpox outbreak in the United States
