= 2022–2023 mpox outbreak in South America =

Ongoing outbreak of mpox in South America

- Disease: Mpox
- Pathogen: Monkeypox virus (West African clade)
- Index case: Buenos Aires, Argentina
- Arrival date: 27 May 2022 (4 years, 1 week and 4 days ago)
- Confirmed cases: 22,293
- Suspected cases^{‡}: 1,900
- Deaths: 44
- Territories: 8

The 2022–2023 mpox outbreak in South America is a part of the outbreak of human mpox caused by the West African clade of the monkeypox virus. The outbreak reached South America on 27 May 2022 when Argentina reported their first case of mpox. As of 14 August 2022, 8 South American countries and territories have confirmed cases.

== Background ==
Mpox (/ˈɛmpɒks/, EM-poks; originally known as monkeypox) is an infectious viral disease that can occur in humans and other animals. Symptoms include a rash that forms blisters and then crusts over, as well as fever and swollen lymph nodes. The illness is usually mild, and most infected individuals recover within a few weeks without treatment. The time from exposure to the onset of symptoms ranges from three to seventeen days, and symptoms typically last from two to four weeks. However, cases may be severe, especially in children, pregnant women, or people with suppressed immune systems.

The disease is caused by the monkeypox virus, a zoonotic virus in the genus Orthopoxvirus. The variola virus, which causes smallpox, is also in this genus. Human-to-human transmission can occur through direct contact with infected skin or body fluids, including sexual contact. People remain infectious from the onset of symptoms until all the lesions have scabbed and healed. The virus may spread from infected animals through handling infected meat or via bites or scratches. Diagnosis can be confirmed by polymerase chain reaction (PCR) testing a lesion for the virus's DNA.

Vaccination is recommended for those at high risk of infection. No vaccine has been developed specifically against mpox, but smallpox vaccines have been found to be effective. There is no specific treatment for the disease, so the aim of treatment is to manage the symptoms and prevent complications. Antiviral drugs such as tecovirimat can be used to treat mpox, although their effectiveness has not been proven.

An ongoing outbreak of mpox was confirmed on 6 May 2022, beginning with a British resident who, after travelling to Nigeria (where the disease is endemic), presented symptoms consistent with mpox on 29 April 2022. The resident returned to the United Kingdom on 4 May, creating the country's index case of the outbreak. The origin of several of the cases of mpox in the United Kingdom is unknown. Some monitors saw community transmission taking place in the London area as of mid-May, but it has been suggested that cases were already spreading in Europe in the previous months.

== Transmission ==
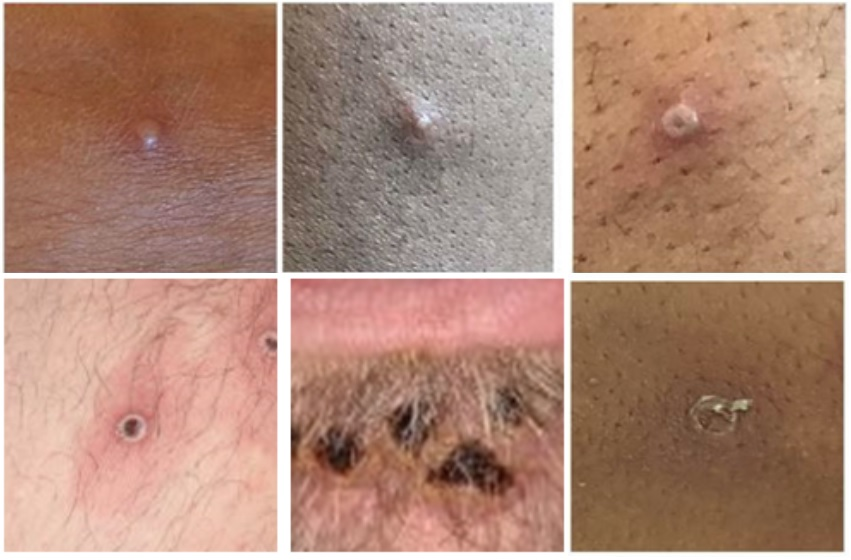
Stages of lesion development. Picture taken by Dr O.O. Afuye on 15 September 2019.

A large portion of those infected were believed to have not recently traveled to areas of Africa where mpox is normally found, such as Nigeria, the Democratic Republic of the Congo as well as central and western Africa. It is believed to be transmitted by close contact with sick people, with extra caution for those individuals with lesions on their skin or genitals, along with their bedding and clothing. The CDC has also stated that individuals should avoid contact and consumption of dead animals such as rats, squirrels, monkeys and apes along with wild game or lotions derived from animals in Africa.

In addition to more common symptoms, such as fever, headache, swollen lymph nodes, and rashes or lesions, some patients have also experienced proctitis, an inflammation of the rectum lining. CDC has also warned clinicians to not rule out mpox in patients with sexually transmitted infections since there have been reports of co-infections with syphilis, gonorrhea, chlamydia, and herpes.

== Timeline ==
=== Arrival ===
An index case was imported into Argentina on 27 May. It was unknown how the disease was contracted, but likely abroad in mpox-affected countries. The patient had likely showed symptoms since 25 May, and was admitted to a hospital on 26 May. The next day, the patient was confirmed to have contracted mpox. The following day, another mpox case was confirmed, and Argentina reported these cases to Reliefweb.

=== Cases transited through South America ===
==== June ====
===== 9 June =====
On 9 June, Brazil confirmed its first case of mpox. It was in a 41-year-old male who may have been infected from recently traveling to Spain and Portugal, which had already been affected by the mpox outbreak. It was likely contracted via skin-to-skin contact.

===== 12 June =====
On 12 June, Venezuela registered its first case of mpox. It was in a male of unknown age who had likely contracted the disease via skin-to-skin contact in Madrid, Spain which had already been affected by the mpox outbreak.

===== 17 June =====
On 17 June, Chile confirmed its first mpox infection. It was in a young male of unknown specific age from the Metropolitan Region. It was likely contracted via skin-to-skin contact from a trip to Europe.

===== 23 June =====
On 23 June, Colombia confirmed its first three cases of mpox in adults of unknown genders and ages. Two of the cases were found in the capital Bogotá, and the third was found in Colombia's second largest city, Medellín. It was unknown how those cases were contracted, although it was likely skin-to-skin contact picked up abroad.

===== 26 June =====
On 26 June, Peru reported its first case of mpox. It was in a foreign citizen of unknown gender or age who resides in Lima. The patient likely got infected via while being in contact with people from abroad. It was likely skin-to-skin contact rather than sexual contact.

==== July ====
===== 6 July =====
On 6 July, Ecuador reported its first mpox infection. It was in a 30-year-old male who resides in the Southwest coastal province of Guayas.

===== 29 July =====
On 29 July, Uruguay registered its first case of mpox. It was in a patient of unknown age and gender. It is unknown how the disease was contracted, but likely skin-to-skin contact abroad.

==== August ====
===== 1 August =====
On 1 August, Bolivia confirmed its first case of mpox. It was in a 38-year-old male. It is unknown how the disease was contracted, but likely skin-to-skin contact picked up abroad.

== Responses ==
=== World Health Organization (WHO) ===
On 20 May, the WHO convened an emergency meeting of independent advisers to discuss the outbreak and assess the threat level. Its European chief, Hans Kluge, expressed concern that infections could accelerate in Europe as people gather for parties and festivals over the summer. On 14 June, the WHO announced plans to rename disease from monkeypox to mpox in order to combat stigma and racism surrounding the disease. Another meeting convened on 23 June determined that the outbreak does not constitute a Public Health Emergency of International Concern for the time being.

=== Countries ===
The majority of South American countries responded to the outbreak, and the responses of some are listed below.

- Brazil: The Brazilian Ministry of Health created groups of biologists to monitor monkeys and medical groups to monitor possible cases. On August 8, 2022, during a podcast, the president of Brazil Jair Bolsonaro made homophobic jokes about the disease. When questioning the host about whether he would get a mpox vaccine, and the host says yes; Jair Bolsonaro replied: "I'm sure you want to get the vaccine. You don't fool me" followed by laughter. The host remains in his serious speech on the subject, Bolsonaro commented: "Don't you understand?" clarifying the homophobic tone of the comment.
- Colombia: As of May, the Colombian Ministry of Health was taking follow-up and control measures. The Director of Epidemiology and Demography of the Ministry of Health, Claudia Cuellar, informed the Colombian population about how mpox is spread through people, and she spoke about the clinical presentation of the virus and international health regulations. Health authorities in the Department of Norte de Santander have been on alert, since the department is a border area where people pass between Colombia and Venezuela.

== Cases per country and territory ==
This is a table of confirmed and suspected mpox cases in South American countries during the ongoing 2022–2023 mpox outbreak. It does not include countries where suspected cases were reported but later discarded. (As of 31 July 2023)

Cases of mpox by countries of South America (last updated on as of 31 July 2023)
Country	Confirmed	Suspected	Total	Deaths	Last update	First confirmed case	First confirmed death
Argentina	1,129	—	1,129	2	25 April 2023	27 May 2022	
Bolivia	265	—	265	—	12 August 2022	1 August 2022	—
Brazil	10,967	1,874	12,841	16	14 July 2023	9 June 2022	29 July 2022
Chile	1,442	26	1,468	3	29 June 2023	17 June 2022	
Colombia	4,090	—	4,090	—	31 July 2023	23 June 2022	—
Ecuador	557	—	557	3	11 August 2022	6 July 2022	8 August 2022
Peru	3,812	—	3,812	20	12 July 2023	26 June 2022	1 August 2022
Uruguay	19	—	19	—	3 August 2022	29 July 2022	—
Venezuela	12	—	12	—	12 June 2022	12 June 2022	—
Total	22,293	1,900	24,193	44	—		

=== Timeline of first confirmed cases by country or territory ===
First confirmed mpox cases by country or territory
Date	Countries / Territories
27 May 2022	Argentina
9 June 2022	Brazil
12 June 2022	Venezuela
17 June 2022	Chile
23 June 2022	Colombia
26 June 2022	Peru
6 July 2022	Ecuador
29 July 2022	Uruguay
1 August 2022	Bolivia
22 August 2022	Guyana
25 August 2022	Paraguay

==== Timeline of suspected cases by country or territory ====
Countries listed below had only suspected cases at the time of reporting. Some countries reported confirmed cases after reporting suspected cases. Countries listed several times reported suspected cases again after they discarded suspected cases before.

Timeline of suspected mpox cases by country or territory
Date	Countries / Territories
23 May 2022	French Guiana (Note: Single territorial collectivity and Overseas Department of France.) (Note: Part of Overseas France) (discounted on 1 June)
25 May 2022	Bolivia (discounted between 3 and 10 June)
27 May 2022	Ecuador (discounted on 30 May)
30 May 2022	Peru (discounted on 2 June) • Brazil (confirmed cases reported on 9 June)
1 June 2022	Paraguay (discounted on 7 June)
2 June 2022	Uruguay (confirmed cases reported on 29 July)
14 June 2022	Ecuador (discounted on 15 June)

=== Timeline of first deaths by country or territory ===
Timeline of mpox deaths by country or territory
Date	Countries / Territories
29 July 2022	Brazil
1 August 2022	Peru
8 August 2022	Ecuador

== See also ==
- 2022–2023 mpox outbreak
- 2022–2023 mpox outbreak in Asia
- 2022–2023 mpox outbreak in Europe
- 2022–2023 mpox outbreak in North America
