= Timeline of the 2023–2025 mpox epidemic =

Major events in a virus outbreak

Map of confirmed cases. Yellow indicates that the country is awaiting test results.

This article documents the chronology and epidemiology of the 2023–2024 mpox epidemic, an outbreak of clade Ib of mpox.

== 2023 ==
=== September ===
Mpox cases from clade Ib infections were growing in the Democratic Republic of the Congo (DRC), with several being identified in Kamituga, a mining town in the province of South Kivu.

== 2024 ==
=== January ===
The Daily Telegraph reported that cases and deaths from mpox in the DRC were 2.5 to 3 times higher in 2023 than in 2022. A nationwide outbreak was reported.

=== March ===
The Republic of the Congo reported 43 new cases of mpox, while the DRC reported 600 deaths.

=== July ===
==== 30 July ====
Pierre Somsé, the Minister of Health of the Central African Republic, declared an outbreak of mpox in Bangui, following a period of time when the disease was mostly restricted to rural areas. Somsé said that some families in the country were hiding infected relatives in fear of being stigmatized, thus increasing the risk of transmission of the disease.

=== August ===
The Africa Centres for Disease Control and Prevention declared that the outbreak had become a public health emergency. They also reported that the fatality rate was 3-4%, significantly higher than the 1% rate reported for the 2022-2023 outbreak.

==== 14 August ====
The World Health Organization declared the outbreak a public health emergency of international concern.

==== 15 August ====
In Sweden, health officials confirmed a case of mpox caused by the clade Ib variant of the virus, in a patient who had recently travelled to a part of Africa where there had been a large outbreak of the disease. The World Health Organization confirmed that this was the first diagnosed case of mpox caused by the clade Ib variant in a patient outside of Africa.

The vaccine alliance, GAVI, announced the availability of up to $500 million (US dollars) from its "First Response" fund, intended to help establish vaccination programs and supply vaccine doses to the countries in Africa most affected by the mpox epidemic. In June 2024, GAVI had earlier approved to establish a global stockpile of mpox vaccines over the course of its next five-year strategic period beginning 2026, but in the interim, GAVI would support the outbreak response in the DRC and surrounding countries, including vaccine dose donations and direct procurement efforts. GAVI stressed that hurdles remain, including the need for the WHO to finalize its assessments and approve candidate vaccines for Emergency Use Listing.

Pakistan reported a new case of mpox, potentially caused by the clade Ib variant, but was later confirmed as the clade II variant.

==== 16 August ====
In the European Union (EU), the European Centre for Disease Prevention and Control (ECDC) officially raised the risk level of clade I mpox to the general population living in the EU from "very low" to "low", due to the likelihood of more imported cases being identified across the continent, although the agency reiterated that the risk of sustained transmission of the virus strain in Europe was still considered to be minimum. The ECDC also advised travellers to consider getting vaccinated against mpox should they visit African countries affected by the outbreak.

The Danish pharmaceutical company Bavarian Nordic announced the submission of clinical data to the European Medicines Agency, including the early results of a NIH's National Institutes of Allergy and Infectious Diseases (NIAID)-sponsored trial in adolescents and adults to support the extension of the approval of Jynneos/Imvanex vaccines to include adolescents aged 12 to 17 years. Bavarian Nordic also stated that a study of the vaccine in children aged 2 to 12 years would take place in the DRC and Uganda later in 2024.

In China, the General Administration of Customs announced that national authorities would deploy screening measures for people and goods entering the country from areas affected by the outbreak for the following six months.

In Pakistan, national authorities had started screening travellers at all airports and at border crossings with surrounding countries.

==== 17 August ====
In Pakistan, the health department of Khyber Pakhtunkhwa, confirmed that three patients had tested positive for mpox, with all three recently returning from the United Arab Emirates. All three cases were later confirmed as being caused by the clade II variant and not the clade Ib variant of mpox.

==== 18 August ====
Taiwan reported three confirmed mpox cases, all of which were later confirmed as being from the clade II and not the clade Ib variant.

==== 19 August ====
In Pakistan, the fourth confirmed mpox case was reported, in a person returning from the Middle East. A police hospital in Khyber Pakhtunkhwa was designated as a treatment center for mpox cases. Later, the Pakistani Ministry of Health stated that none of the 4 reported cases in the country had been caused by the clade Ib mpox variant.

The Philippines reported its first suspected case, however this case was later confirmed as being caused by the clade II mpox variant.

==== 20 August ====
The Africa Centres for Disease Control and Prevention (Africa CDC) gave a briefing revealing the organization had been working with the African countries most affected by mpox to establish the logistics and communications needed for vaccine rollout using doses of mpox vaccine, pledged by the EU, Danish vaccine maker Bavarian Nordic, the US and Japan that were due to arrive shortly. Jean Kaseya, the director-general of the Africa CDC said "we didn't start vaccinations yet. We'll start in a few days, if we are sure that everything is in place. End of next week vaccines will start to arrive in DRC and other countries".

A Malawi hospital reported a suspected case of Mpox.

==== 21 August ====
The United Nations' International Organization for Migration (IOM) appealed for $18.5 million (US dollars) to assist health care provision to people impacted by the mpox outbreak in East and Southern Africa. IOM Director General Amy Pope said "the spread of mpox across East, Horn, and Southern Africa is a grave concern, especially for the vulnerable migrant, highly mobile populations and displaced communities often overlooked in such crises".

Wayne County, Michigan, United States confirmed a case of mpox, but are awaiting test results to determine the variant.

==== 22 August ====
In Thailand, the Thai Department of Disease Control confirmed an mpox case caused by the clade Ib virus variant, making this the second confirmed case outside of Africa caused by the clade Ib variant. The patient was reported to be a 66-year old European man who is a resident of Thailand who had recently visited a country in Africa affected by the outbreak, before returning to Thailand via an undisclosed Middle Eastern country. Thongchai Keeratihattayakorn, director-general of the Thai Department of Disease Control said "this man is likely infected from an endemic country" and that no other local infections had been found by contact tracing.

According to the Reuters news agency, on the 22 August 2024, the following countries had reported cases of mpox confirmed as being caused by the new clade Ib variant: Democratic Republic of Congo, Burundi, Kenya, Rwanda, Uganda, Sweden and Thailand.

In Gabon, the Health Ministry reported the country's first case of mpox, without specifying the clade of the virus, in a man who recently returned from Uganda. Similarly, the WHO reported the first cases of clade II mpox in the Ivory Coast since the widespread global outbreak of 2022.

==== 26 August ====
The World Health Organization (WHO) launched a global Strategic Preparedness and Response Plan (SPRP) to stop human-to-human transmission of mpox through coordinated global, regional, and national efforts. The SPRP covers the six-month period of September 2024-February 2025 and will require at least $135 million (US dollars) in funding, and will involve the coordination of the WHO, WHO-member states, and partners including the Africa Centres for Disease Control (Africa CDC), communities and researchers.

In Germany, the government announced the donation of 100,000 doses of mpox vaccines along with other forms of support, in coordination with the WHO and the GAVI vaccination alliance, to help contain the mpox outbreak in African countries.

==== 27 August ====
The United Nations High Commissioner for Refugees (UNHCR) issued a call to action over concerns about the impact of mpox on refugees and displaced persons in Africa. The press release intended to draw attention to suspected cases of mpox being reported in conflict-impacted provinces of the Democratic Republic of the Congo (DRC), including North Kivu and South Kivu provinces, that host the majority of DRC's 7.3 million internally displaced people. Suspected and confirmed cases have been identified amongst the refugee population, not just in the DRC but in neighbouring Rwanda and the Republic of Congo. Dr. Allen Maina, the Public Health Chief for the UNHCR said "for those fleeing violence, implementing many of the mpox measures is a tremendous challenge. They have no space to isolate when they develop symptoms of the disease," saying that individuals infected by the virus were having to sleep in the open in order to distance themselves to protect others. The Reuters news agency reported that whilst it is not clear if the mpox cases in the refugee displacement camps were caused by the new clade Ib variant of the virus, the WHO's spokesperson Margaret Harris said South Kivu is already an area where the new virus variant is known to be circulating.

In Spain, the government announced the donation of 100,000 vials of mpox vaccine, or 500,000 individual vaccine doses, to help control the outbreak in the worst affected regions of Africa. A statement released by the Spanish Health ministry said this donation of vaccine constituted approximately 20% of its overall stockpile, and called on the European Commission to propose that all EU member states should likewise donate 20% of their respective stockpiles.

==== 28 August ====
In Nigeria, the National Primary Health Care Development Agency (NPHCDA) announced vaccination against mpox would begin on 10 October 2024 after the first delivery of mpox vaccine donated by the United States Agency for International Development (USAID). The delivery consisted of 9,980 individual doses of Jynneos MVA-BN vaccine, manufactured by the Danish pharmaceutical company Bavarian Nordic. An NPHCDA spokesperson said, that subject to regulatory lab analysis, the vaccines would be distributed across five states, with 4,750 persons receiving two doses each, 28 days apart, targeted at those at greatest risk including persons with close contact with mpox cases, health workers and persons with low immune status.

=== September ===
==== 5 September ====
The Democratic Republic of Congo received its first delivery of mpox vaccines from overseas. The delivery, donated by the European Union (EU), consisted of approximately 100,000 individual doses of MVA-BN vaccine manufactured by the Danish pharmaceutical company Bavarian Nordic. A second scheduled of another 100,000 vaccine doses from the EU was expected to take place two days later. At the time of this delivery, the EU was reported as aiming to deliver at least 566,500 doses of vaccine to African countries based on those with the greatest need, to be co-ordinated with the Africa Centres for Disease Control (Africa CDC); of these doses, the EU has agreed to donate 215,000 vaccine doses itself, with an additional 351,500 doses donated by individual EU member states including France, Germany, Spain, Malta, Portugal, Luxembourg, Croatia, Austria, Poland, and potentially others. Laurent Muschel, the acting Director-General of the EU's Health Emergency Preparedness and Response Authority (HERA) said "based on the number of cases, the next country (for deliveries) should be Burundi, but the country's medical agency must authorise it."

== 2025 ==
=== September ===
==== 5 September ====
On 5 September 2025, the World Health Organization ending the mpox epidemic a public health emergency of international concern.

=== December ===
In the third week of December, Madagascar reported its first case of clade Ib.

== 2026 ==
=== April ===
==== 1 April ====
In Madagascar, it had spread to 20 out of 24 of the country's regions, with 788 total cases and two deaths. From early February to late March, Madagascar had the most new cases, 411, to the Democratic Republic of Congo's 247.

== See also ==
- Timeline of the 2022–2023 mpox outbreak
