= 2022–2023 mpox outbreak in North America =

Ongoing outbreak of mpox in North America

- Disease: Mpox
- Pathogen: Monkeypox virus (West African clade)
- Index case: Massachusetts, United States
- Arrival date: 18 May 2022 (4 years, 4 months, 3 weeks and 2 days ago)
- Confirmed cases: 17,608
- Suspected cases: 224
- Deaths: 3: Cuba (1); Mexico (1); United States (1)
- Territories: 20

Government website
- [Response Website]

The 2022–2023 mpox outbreak in North America is a part of the outbreak of human mpox caused by the West African clade of the monkeypox virus. The outbreak reached North America on 18 May 2022, when the United States reported their first case of mpox. As of 23 August 2022, 20 North American countries and territories have confirmed cases.

== Background ==
Mpox (/ˈɛmpɒks/, EM-poks; originally known as monkeypox) is an infectious viral disease that can occur in humans and other animals. Symptoms include a rash that forms blisters and then crusts over, as well as fever and swollen lymph nodes. The illness is usually mild, and most infected individuals recover within a few weeks without treatment. The time from exposure to the onset of symptoms ranges from three to seventeen days, and symptoms typically last from two to four weeks. However, cases may be severe, especially in children, pregnant women, or people with suppressed immune systems.

The disease is caused by the monkeypox virus, a zoonotic virus in the genus Orthopoxvirus. The variola virus, which causes smallpox, is also in this genus. Human-to-human transmission can occur through direct contact with infected skin or body fluids, including sexual contact. People remain infectious from the onset of symptoms until all the lesions have scabbed and healed. The virus may spread from infected animals through handling infected meat or via bites or scratches. Diagnosis can be confirmed by polymerase chain reaction (PCR) testing a lesion for the virus's DNA.

Vaccination is recommended for those at high risk of infection. No vaccine has been developed specifically against mpox, but smallpox vaccines have been found to be effective. There is no specific treatment for the disease, so the aim of treatment is to manage the symptoms and prevent complications. Antiviral drugs such as tecovirimat can be used to treat mpox, although their effectiveness has not been proven.

An ongoing outbreak of mpox was confirmed on May 6, 2022, beginning with a British resident who, after travelling to Nigeria (where the disease is endemic), presented symptoms consistent with mpox on 29 April 2022. The resident returned to the United Kingdom on May 4, creating the country's index case of the outbreak. The origin of several of the cases of mpox in the United Kingdom is unknown. Some monitors saw community transmission taking place in the London area as of mid-May, but it has been suggested that cases were already spreading in Europe in the previous months.

== Transmission ==
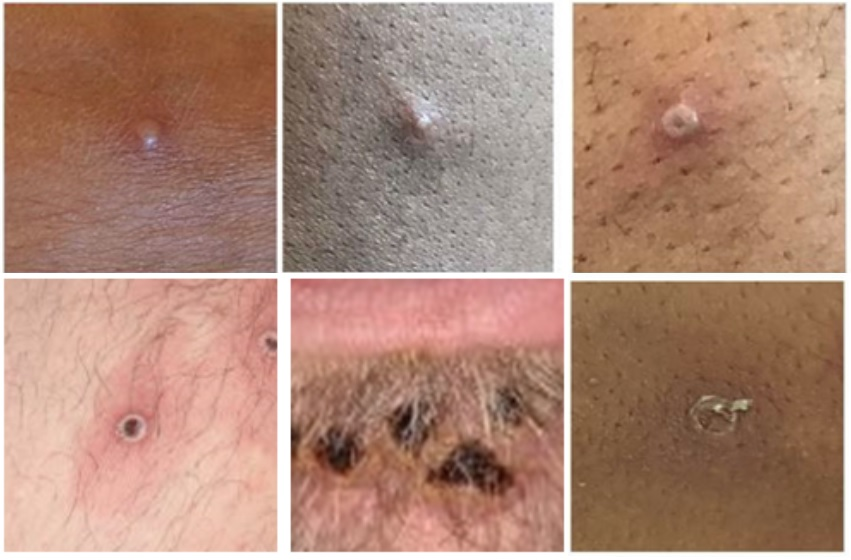
Stages of lesion development. Picture taken by Dr O.O. Afuye on 15 September 2019.

A large portion of those infected were believed to have not recently traveled to areas of Africa where mpox is normally found, such as Nigeria, the Democratic Republic of the Congo as well as central and western Africa. It is believed to be transmitted by close contact with sick people, with extra caution for those individuals with lesions on their skin or genitals, along with their bedding and clothing. The CDC has also stated that individuals should avoid contact and consumption of dead animals such as rats, squirrels, monkeys and apes along with wild game or lotions derived from animals in Africa.

In addition to more common symptoms, such as fever, headache, swollen lymph nodes, and rashes or lesions, some patients have also experienced proctitis, an inflammation of the rectum lining. CDC has also warned clinicians to not rule out mpox in patients with sexually transmitted infections since there have been reports of co-infections with syphilis, gonorrhea, chlamydia, and herpes.

== Timeline ==
=== Arrival ===
An index case was imported into the United States on 18 May 2022, by a man who had recently travelled to Canada. He was admitted to a hospital in Massachusetts, likely on 17 May. The day after, the man was confirmed to have contracted mpox. The following day, another mpox case was confirmed, and the United States reported these cases to the World Health Organization (WHO) and the Centers for Disease Control and Prevention (CDC).

=== Cases transited through North America ===
==== May ====
===== 19 May =====
On 19 May, Canada confirmed the first two cases of mpox. Health officials revealed that there was a link between the U.S. case of mpox in Massachusetts and a few of the suspected cases in the Montreal region. The patient of unknown gender or age, may have been infected when recently traveling to Canada. The spread was likely through skin-to-skin contact picked up abroad.

===== 28 May =====
On 28 May, Mexico registered its first case of mpox. It was in a 50-year-old male who resides in the city of New York City and is being treated at Mexico City. It was noted that he may have contracted the disease abroad, from the Netherlands, where there it had already been affected by mpox. It was likely picked up by skin-to-skin contact picked up abroad.

==== June ====
===== 29 June =====
On 29 June, Puerto Rico, a US Territory, confirmed its first case of mpox. It was likely in a male, age between 20 and 50 years old. It is unknown how it was contracted, but likely skin-to-skin contact picked up abroad.

===== 30 June =====
On 30 June, the Bahamas confirmed its first mpox case in a male visitor in his 40s who had most likely contracted the disease from a trip to London, UK, which had already been affected by the mpox outbreak on 9 June. It was likely picked up from skin-to-skin contact abroad.

==== July ====
===== 5 July =====
On 5 July, Panama received its first mpox infection in a resident of unknown gender and age who most likely contracted the disease via contact with tourists from Europe, which had already been affected by the mpox outbreak. It was likely skin-to-skin contact rather than sexual contact.

===== 6 July =====
On 6 July, Jamaica registered its first mpox case. It was in a male of unknown age who had most likely contracted the disease from a trip to London, UK, which had already been affected by the mpox outbreak. It was likely picked up from skin-to-skin contact abroad.

On the same day, the Dominican Republic also confirmed its first case of mpox. It was in a 25-year-old male who had most likely contracted the disease via contact with a person who was infected with mpox in the United States. It was likely skin-to-skin contact rather than sexual contact.

===== 16 July =====
On 16 July, Barbados confirmed its first mpox infection. It was in a Barbadian patient of unknown gender in his 30s. It is unknown how the patient contracted the disease, but likely via skin-to-skin contact abroad.

===== 17 July =====
On 17 July, Martinique, part of Overseas France and a Single territorial collectivity and an Overseas Department of France, received its first mpox case. It was in an adult of unknown exact age and gender who most likely contracted the disease from a trip to a country which had been affected by the mpox outbreak. It was likely picked up via skin-to-skin contact abroad.

===== 20 July =====
On 20 July, Costa Rica recorded its first mpox infection. It was in a 34-year-old male from the United States who resided in Costa Rica for 2 years. He most likely contracted it from a trip to the United States abroad and is considered an imported case. It was likely picked up via skin-to-skin contact.

===== 22 July =====
On 22 July, Bermuda, a British Overseas Territory, although technically part of North America, registered its first mpox case. It is unknown what the patient's gender and age is and how the patient contracted the disease, but it was likely via skin-to-skin contact abroad.

===== 25 July =====
On 25 July, Guadeloupe, part of Overseas France and an Overseas Department of France, confirmed its first case of mpox. It was in a patient of unknown gender or age who resides in Guadeloupe. The patient recently travelled to France and likely contracted the disease via contact with someone in France. It was likely skin-to-skin contact rather than sexual contact.

==== August ====
===== 1 August =====
On 1 August, Collectivity of Saint Martin, part of Overseas France, confirmed its first case of mpox. It was in a patient of unknown gender or age whose residence is unknown. It is unknown how it was contracted, however it may be likely that it was picked up via skin-to-skin contact abroad.

===== 3 August =====
On 3 August, Guatemala registered its first case of mpox. It was in a 31-year-old male who had likely contracted the disease via contact with foreigners/tourists from another country. It was likely skin-to-skin contact rather than sexual contact.

===== 9 August =====
On 9 August, Greenland reported its first two cases of mpox. It was in patients of unknown genders and ages who likely contracted the disease via skin-to-skin contact picked up abroad.

===== 12 August =====
On 12 August, Honduras reported its first case of mpox in an adult male under 50 years of age. It is unknown how the male contracted the disease, although it was likely picked up via contact with other infected abroad.

===== 19 August =====
On 19 August, Curaçao confirmed its first case of mpox in a patient of unknown gender and age who likely contracted the disease abroad, via skin-to-skin contact or sexual contact with others.

===== 20 August =====
On 20 August, Cuba reported its first mpox infection. It was in a male Italian tourist of unknown gender. He most likely contracted the disease from a trip to Italy and other various destinations in the Caribbean. It is unknown how the disease was contracted, but likely via skin-to-skin contact rather than sexual contact.

The man fell into cardiac arrest, likely on the same day he was diagnosed, which he recovered from, but remained in critical condition at the time. He later died on 21 August after rapidly deteriorating. This marked Cuba's first death, as well as North America's first death during the ongoing outbreak.

===== 22 August =====
On 22 August, Aruba reported its first case of mpox. It was in a patient of unknown age and gender who resides in Aruba. It is unknown how the patient contracted the disease, but likely contracted the disease abroad, via skin-to-skin contact or sexual contact with others.

== Responses ==
=== World Health Organization (WHO) ===
On 20 May, the WHO convened an emergency meeting of independent advisers to discuss the outbreak and assess the threat level. Its European chief, Hans Kluge, expressed concern that infections could accelerate in Europe as people gather for parties and festivals over the summer. On 14 June, the WHO announced plans to rename the disease from monkeypox to mpox in order to combat stigma and racism surrounding the disease. Another meeting convened on 23 June determined that the outbreak does not constitute a Public Health Emergency of International Concern for the time being.

=== Countries ===
The majority of North American countries responded to the outbreak, and the responses of some are listed below.

- Canada: On 21 April, Public Services and Procurement Canada published a tender request seeking to stockpile doses of smallpox vaccine to be prepared in the event of a future accidental or intentional release of the virus. The contract for 500,000 doses closed on 5 May, and was awarded to Bavarian Nordic. On 24 May, the Public Health Agency of Canada stated that they were in the process of extracting Imvamune vaccines from their National Emergency Strategic Stockpile for deployment across the country, starting with the province of Quebec. On 26 May, Quebec announced that Imvamune vaccines would be made available to those who have been in close contact with confirmed or suspected mpox cases. On 7 June, PHAC announced that travellers returning to Canada may be subject to a mandatory quarantine period if they become ill with mpox, and warned that quarantined travellers may have restricted access to health care and delays returning home.
- Dominican Republic: In May, the Ministry of Public Health of the Dominican Republic issued a preventive epidemiological alert after mpox was reported in several countries.
- Guatemala: On 26 May, the Minister of Health of Guatemala, Francisco Coma, informed that the Ministry declared an epidemiological alert on the borders of the Central American country, with the objective of detecting possible cases of mpox. The minister also mentioned that one of the main transmissions of mpox is from injuries and body fluids as well as contact with contaminated clothing.
- Mexico: In May, Mexican health authorities have posted notices in clinics and hospitals for the purpose of identifying suspected cases in the country. In addition, the Ministry of Health has issued an epidemiological alert on 26 May 2022.
- United States: On 22 May, President Joe Biden commented "they haven't told me the level of exposure yet but it is something that everybody should be concerned about". National security advisor Jake Sullivan told reporters the US has a vaccine that is relevant to treating mpox. On 25 May, the CDC issued an alert for gay and bisexual men to be especially vigilant. In addition, the CDC placed its mpox travel alert at "Level 2", following reports of cases in Australia and several countries in Europe. Beginning 18 July 2022, Sonic Healthcare USA started testing for mpox using CDC's orthopoxvirus test, which includes monkeypox virus at Sonic Reference Laboratory in Austin, Texas.

We were unable to record Overseas and Dependant territories' response to the outbreak.

== Cases per country and territory ==
This is a table of confirmed and suspected mpox cases in North American countries during the ongoing 2022–2023 mpox outbreak. It does not include countries where suspected cases were reported but later discarded. (As of 24 August 2022)

Cases of mpox by countries of North America (last updated on as of 24 August 2022)
Country	Confirmed	Suspected	Total	Deaths	Last update	First confirmed case	First confirmed death	Last confirmed case
Aruba (Note: Constituent country of the Kingdom of the Netherlands)	1	—	1	—	22 August 2022	22 August 2022		
Bahamas	2	—	2	—	22 August 2022	30 June 2022		
Barbados	1	—	1	—	16 July 2022	16 July 2022		
Bermuda (Note: British Overseas Territory.)	1	—	1	—	22 July 2022	22 July 2022		
Canada	1,198	45	1,243	—	19 August 2022	19 May 2022		
Collectivity of Saint Martin (Note: Part of Overseas France)	1	—	1	—	1 August 2022	1 August 2022		
Costa Rica	3	—	3	—	26 July 2022	20 July 2022		
Cuba	1	—	1	1	20 August 2022	20 August 2022	21 August 2022	
Curacao	1	—	1	—	19 August 2022	19 August 2022		
Dominican Republic	6	—	6	—	17 August 2022	6 July 2022		
Greenland	2	—	2	—	9 August 2022	9 August 2022		
Guadeloupe (Note: Sui generis collectivity of France)	1	—	1	—	25 July 2022	25 July 2022		
Guatemala	3	7	10	—	10 August 2022	3 August 2022		
Honduras	3	—	3	—	14 August 2022	12 August 2022		
Jamaica	4	—	4	—	10 August 2022	6 July 2022		
Martinique (Note: Single territorial collectivity and Overseas Department of France.)	2	—	2	—	11 August 2022	17 July 2022		
Mexico	386	172	558	1	23 August 2022	28 May 2022	23 August 2022	
Panama	7	—	7	—	19 August 2022	5 July 2022		
Puerto Rico (Note: Unincorporated territory of the United States.)	77	—	77	—	22 August 2022	29 June 2022		
United States	15,909	—	15,909	—	23 August 2022	18 May 2022		
Total	17,608	224	17,832	24 August 2022	—			

=== Timeline of first confirmed cases by country or territory ===
First confirmed mpox cases by country or territory
Date	Countries / Territories
18 May 2022	United States
19 May 2022	Canada
28 May 2022	Mexico
29 June 2022	Puerto Rico (Note: Unincorporated territory of the United States.)
30 June 2022	Bahamas
5 July 2022	Panama
6 July 2022	Jamaica · Dominican Republic
16 July 2022	Barbados
17 July 2022	Martinique (Note: Single territorial collectivity and Overseas Department of France.) (Note: Part of Overseas France)
20 July 2022	Costa Rica
22 July 2022	Bermuda (Note: British Overseas Territory.)
25 July 2022	Guadeloupe (Note: Sui generis collectivity of France)
1 August 2022	Collectivity of Saint Martin
3 August 2022	Guatemala
9 August 2022	Greenland
12 August 2022	Honduras
19 August 2022	Curaçao (Note: Constituent country of the Kingdom of the Netherlands)
20 August 2022	Cuba
22 August 2022	Aruba

==== Timeline of suspected cases by country or territory ====
Countries listed below had only suspected cases at the time of reporting. Some countries reported confirmed cases after reporting suspected cases. Countries listed several times reported suspected cases again after they discarded suspected cases before.

Timeline of suspected mpox cases by country or territory
Date	Countries / Territories
1 June 2022	Costa Rica (discounted on June 4) • Haiti (discounted on July 5)
2 June 2022	Cayman Islands (Note: Single territorial collectivity and Overseas Department of France.) (discounted on June 30)
7 June 2022	Bahamas (confirmed cases reported on June 30)

=== Timeline of first deaths by country or territory ===
Timeline of mpox deaths by country or territory
Date	Countries / Territories
21 August 2022	Cuba
23 August 2022	Mexico
30 August 2022	United States

As of 22 August 2022, 20 North American countries and territories have been affected by the outbreak.

== See also ==
- 2022–2023 mpox outbreak
- 2022–2023 mpox outbreak in Asia
- 2022–2023 mpox outbreak in Europe
- 2022–2023 mpox outbreak in South America
