= Antonio Siccardi =

Italian immunologist and virologist

- Born: October 1, 1944 (age 82); Varese

Academic background
- Education: University of Pavia

Academic work
- Discipline: Immunology; Virology
- Institutions: University of Milan

Antonio G. Siccardi (born 1 October 1944, Varese) is an Italian immunologist and virologist.

Siccardi studied at the medical faculty of the University of Pavia and received his M.D. in 1968. He later became associate professor for genetics (1973 to 1980) and then for microbiology (1974 to 1980). After a short research trip to Rome as a full professor (1980 to 1982), he became full Professor for molecular immunology at the University of Milan from 1982 until today. From 1990 to 1994 he was Operative Director of the DIBIT, San Raffaele Scientific Institute in Milan. From 1991 to 1998 he coordinated the HIV/AIDS research at the Ospedale San Raffaele of the University of Milan. He is (2015) professor for molecular immunology at the university of Milan and member of the board of the Istituto Nazionale di Genetica Molecolare (INGM). From 2000 to 2008 he also was a deputy professor for genetics at the Faculty of Psychology of the Università Vita-Salute San Raffaele in Milan and from 2006 to today (2015) deputy professor for History of Molecular Genetics at the Faculty of Biotechnology of the Università Vita Salute San Raffaele.

Siccardi's areas of research comprise HIV, influenza, cancer (especially mesothelioma), immunoglobulin E, and vaccine design of recombinant Modified Vaccinia Ankara virus (MVA) or Fowlpoxvirus. Siccardi developed a recombinant MVA-based vector for vaccination with different fluorescent reporter genes, which indicate the progress of genetic recombination with the transgene of an antigen (green, colorless, red).
