= Geology of Martinique =

Martinique is a volcanic island in the Lesser Antilles of the West Indies, in the eastern Caribbean Sea. A part of the French West Indies, it is an overseas department and region and a single territorial collectivity of France. Its geology is shaped by the subduction of the Atlantic Ocean Plate beneath the Caribbean Plate. Its bedrock spans three major volcanic complexes formed during different geological eras. The island is also prone to major geo-hazards such as earthquakes and landslides.

== Formation ==
The island developed along the Lesser Antilles subduction zone shaped by the subduction of the Atlantic Ocean Plate beneath the Caribbean Plate, with volcanic arc activity spread across three distinct timelines. Beginning in the Oligocene–Miocene era, it was followed by intermediate volcanism (16–8 million years ago), and ongoing recent volcanism (5.5 million years ago to present). Mount Pelée was a stratovolcano built in the last 130,000 years, with multiple flank collapses forming horseshoe calderas and hosting two lava domes, Over 20 eruptions of this volcano has been recorded in 5,000 years. Carbet Pitons are a cluster of andesitic lava domes formed since the last one million years.

== Composition ==
The rocks consist of andesite and dacite with alkaline calcium, hornblende, orthopyroxene, clinopyroxene, plagioclase, and occasional quartz. It is dominated by volcanic breccias, pyroclastic deposits, and lava domes.

== Activities ==
Over 600 geological events have been recorded since 1980s, including Pelée flank collapses triggering large submarine debris flows. As it is located on a subduction interface, it is prone to earthquakes and tsunamis.
