= 2022–2023 mpox outbreak in Austria =

Ongoing viral outbreak

- Disease: Mpox
- Pathogen: Monkeypox virus (West African clade)
- Location: Austria
- Index case: Vienna, Austria
- Arrival date: 22 May 2022 (4 years, 4 months, 1 week and 1 day ago)
- Date: 30 August 2024
- Confirmed cases: 348
- Suspected cases: 0
- Deaths: 1

The 2022–2023 mpox outbreak in Austria is part of the larger outbreak of human mpox caused by the West African clade of the monkeypox virus. Austria is the fifteenth country outside of Africa to experience an endemic mpox outbreak. The first case was reported in Vienna, Austria, on 22 May 2022. As of 2 December, Austria has confirmed a total of 327 cases.

== Background ==
Mpox (/ˈɛmpɒks/, EM-poks; originally known as monkeypox) is an infectious viral disease that can occur in humans and other animals. Symptoms include a rash that forms blisters and then crusts over, as well as fever and swollen lymph nodes. The illness is usually mild, and most infected individuals recover within a few weeks without treatment. The time from exposure to the onset of symptoms ranges from three to seventeen days, and symptoms typically last from two to four weeks. However, cases may be severe, especially in children, pregnant women, or people with suppressed immune systems.

The disease is caused by the monkeypox virus, a zoonotic virus in the genus Orthopoxvirus. The variola virus, which causes smallpox, is also in this genus. Human-to-human transmission can occur through direct contact with infected skin or body fluids, including sexual contact. People remain infectious from the onset of symptoms until all the lesions have scabbed and healed. The virus may spread from infected animals through handling infected meat or via bites or scratches. Diagnosis can be confirmed by polymerase chain reaction (PCR) testing a lesion for the virus's DNA.

Vaccination is recommended for those at high risk of infection. No vaccine has been developed specifically against mpox, but smallpox vaccines have been found to be effective. There is no specific treatment for the disease, so the aim of treatment is to manage the symptoms and prevent complications. Antiviral drugs such as tecovirimat can be used to treat mpox, although their effectiveness has not been proven.

An ongoing outbreak of mpox was confirmed on 6 May 2022, beginning with a British resident who, after travelling to Nigeria (where the disease is endemic), presented symptoms consistent with mpox on 29 April 2022. The resident returned to the United Kingdom on May 4, creating the country's index case of the outbreak. The origin of several of the cases of mpox in the United Kingdom is unknown. Some monitors saw community transmission taking place in the London area as of mid-May, but it has been suggested that cases were already spreading in Europe in the previous months.

== Transmission ==
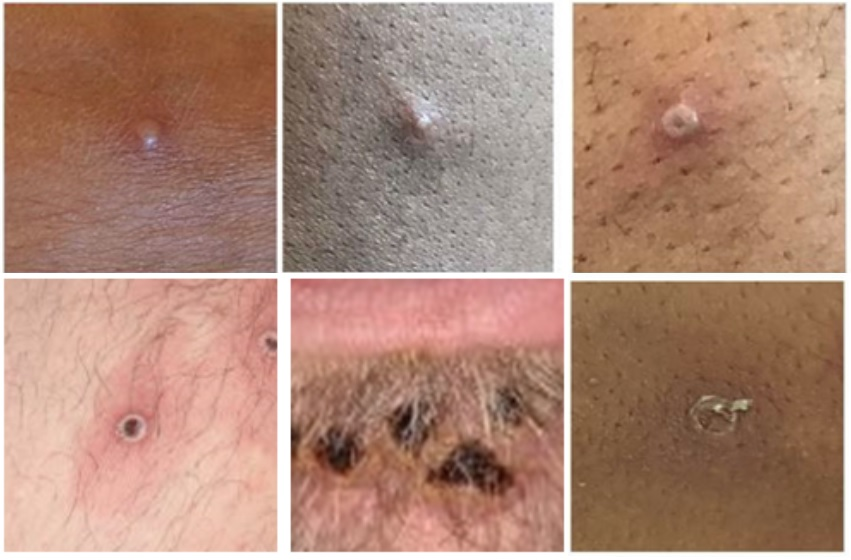
Stages of lesion development. Picture taken by Dr O.O. Afuye on 15 September 2019.

A large portion of those infected were believed to have not recently traveled to areas of Africa where mpox is normally found, such as Nigeria, the Democratic Republic of the Congo as well as central and western Africa. It is believed to be transmitted by close contact with sick people, with extra caution for those individuals with lesions on their skin or genitals, along with their bedding and clothing. The CDC has also stated that individuals should avoid contact and consumption of dead animals such as rats, squirrels, monkeys and apes along with wild game or lotions derived from animals in Africa.

In addition to more common symptoms, such as fever, headache, swollen lymph nodes, and rashes or lesions, some patients have also experienced proctitis, an inflammation of the rectum lining. CDC has also warned clinicians to not rule out mpox in patients with sexually transmitted infections since there have been reports of co-infections with syphilis, gonorrhea, chlamydia, and herpes.

== History ==
The first known case was detected in on 22 May 2022, with a 35-year-old man in Vienna, Austria. The person was hospitalized in Vienna. There, he tested positive for mpox, becoming the first case in Austria.

Two weeks after the man tested positive, additional cases were reported in Austria days later and more are being quarantined. As of 10 August, there are 175 cases and no suspected cases.

Till 22 August 2022, there have been 217 confirmed cases of mpox in Austria.

== Responses and reactions ==
Hospitals have also begun making their own preparations to help control the current mpox outbreak, including screening patients, increasing decontamination and cleaning procedures, and wearing appropriate safety gear (Personal protective equipment / Medical gown) when interacting with infected patients.

Austria also published a set of guidelines in hopes of containing the disease in the country. A three-week quarantine was set into place for infected patients. Isolation can be performed at home or at hospital, depending on the state of health of the patient, according to the Ministry of Health.

== See also ==
- 2022–2023 mpox outbreak
- 2022–2023 mpox outbreak in Germany
- 2022–2023 mpox outbreak in Switzerland
