= 2022–2023 mpox outbreak in Germany =

Ongoing viral outbreak

- Disease: Mpox
- Pathogen: Monkeypox virus (West African clade)
- Location: Germany
- Index case: Munich, Germany
- Arrival date: 19 May 2022 (3 years, 11 months, 4 weeks and 1 day ago)
- Date: As of 30 August 2024
- Confirmed cases: 3,886 (#Cumulative number of cases)

The 2022–2023 mpox outbreak in Germany is part of an ongoing global outbreak of human mpox caused by the West African clade of the monkeypox virus. At the beginning of September 2022, Spain, France, Germany and the United Kingdom are the countries with most cumulative cases (in absolute numbers) in Europe.

== Background ==
Mpox (/ˈɛmpɒks/, EM-poks; originally known as monkeypox) is an infectious viral disease that can occur in humans and other animals. Symptoms include a rash that forms blisters and then crusts over, as well as fever and swollen lymph nodes. The illness is usually mild, and most infected individuals recover within a few weeks without treatment. The time from exposure to the onset of symptoms ranges from three to seventeen days, and symptoms typically last from two to four weeks. However, cases may be severe, especially in children, pregnant women, or people with suppressed immune systems.

The disease is caused by the monkeypox virus, a zoonotic virus in the genus Orthopoxvirus. The variola virus, which causes smallpox, is also in this genus. Human-to-human transmission can occur through direct contact with infected skin or body fluids, including sexual contact. People remain infectious from the onset of symptoms until all the lesions have scabbed and healed. The virus may spread from infected animals through handling infected meat or via bites or scratches. Diagnosis can be confirmed by polymerase chain reaction (PCR) testing a lesion for the virus's DNA.

Vaccination is recommended for those at high risk of infection. No vaccine has been developed specifically against mpox, but smallpox vaccines have been found to be effective. There is no specific treatment for the disease, so the aim of treatment is to manage the symptoms and prevent complications. Antiviral drugs such as tecovirimat can be used to treat mpox, although their effectiveness has not been proven.

=== Detection in Europe ===
An ongoing outbreak of mpox was confirmed on 6 May 2022, beginning with a British resident who, after travelling to Nigeria (where the disease is endemic), presented symptoms consistent with mpox on 29 April 2022. The resident returned to the United Kingdom on 4 May, creating the country's index case of the outbreak. The origin of several of the cases of mpox in the United Kingdom is unknown. Some monitors saw community transmission taking place in the London area as of mid-May, but it has been suggested that cases were already spreading in Europe in the previous months.

=== Development potential ===
German virologist Christian Drosten from the Charité – who was the main medical adviser for the German federal government for measures against the COVID-19 pandemic in Germany and who warned early that the SARS virus potential needed to be investigated – warned in May 2023 that the Mpox disease could aggravate: "Wir wissen aus der Geschichte, dass andere Pockenvirus-Infektionen mit milden Verläufen begannen und sich dann in der Anpassung an den Menschen verstärkt haben" [We know from history that other smallpox virus infections began with mild courses and then intensified as they adapted to humans].

== Transmission ==
A large portion of those infected had not recently travelled to areas of Africa where mpox is endemic, such as Nigeria, the Democratic Republic of the Congo as well as central and western Africa. It is transmitted by close contact with infected people, with extra caution for those individuals with lesions on their skin or genitals, along with their bedding and clothing. The disease can spread via respiratory secretions or by direct contact with rashes, body fluids or by touching objects and fabrics that have been used by someone with mpox. The CDC has also stated that individuals should avoid contact and consumption of dead animals such as rats, squirrels, monkeys and apes along with wild game or lotions derived from animals in Africa.

== History ==
On 20 May 2022, the first case of mpox was serologically detected in a man in Munich, who showed "characteristic skin changes" already the day before.

=== May & June 2022 ===
Until the end of May 2022, 33 cases of mpox were confirmed, on 10 June the (cumulated) number of cases was 165, and as of 5 July the number rose to 1,242.

As of 3 June 2022, the most affected federal state of Germany in terms of reported cases has been the city-state of Berlin − with 39 reported cases in Berlin and 65 in the whole country, and as of 28 June Berlin reported about two thirds of all cases (557 out of 838). The city-state planned to start vaccination during the week of 4 July.

=== July 2022 ===
As of 1 July 2022 there were 1,054 cases reported for the whole country, albeit the Robert Koch Institute (RKI) expounded that the situation was not worrisome ("nicht beunruhigend") for the general population. As of 5 July 2022 there were 761 reported cases in city-state of Berlin alone; one article criticized that vaccinations had not yet started in Berlin, although 8,000 vaccine doses of non-replicating smallpox vaccine were already in stock. Vaccination in Berlin were going to start in the week of 11 July.

As of 8 July 2022 there were 1,490 reported cases in Germany. On 19, 2 July 033 (cumulative) cases were reported, with 1,140 cases in Berlin alone; on 22 July, the state of Berlin was applying for more vaccine allocations due to high demand.

On 22 July 2022, the European Medicines Agency recommended the approval of Imvanex smallpox vaccine for the prevention of mpox disease, and the European Commission subsequently approved it. (The vaccinations with Imvanex started earlier, depending on the federal state; in Lower Saxony they started on 3 July 2022 and in Berlin on 13 July.)

Till July 2022, the Federal Republic has received 40,000 doses (of the Imvanex smallpox vaccine) and distributed them to the federal states. Another 200,000 vaccine doses are expected for September. At the end of July, the Deutsche Aidshilfe e.V. (de) appealed to the German government to order 1 million vaccine doses in order to enable the (full) vaccination of up to 500,000 people.

=== August 2022 ===
Till 5 August 2022, 2887 confirmed cases were reported for the whole country and about half of the cases (1436) were reported from city-state of Berlin alone. In addition to the 9,500 vaccine doses Berlin already received, the federal government is expected give Berlin an additional 1,900 doses in the week of 8 August 2022.

In Berlin where the highest number of reported new mpox infections occurred for a long time, this number has decreased significantly by mid-August. By 19 August 2022, 6417 vaccinations (including 90 second shots) against mpox had been administered at the 28 vaccination sites in Berlin.

=== Since September 2022 ===
As of 9 September 2022, a total of 3530 cases of mpox have been reported to RKI, including 14 cases in females and 2 cases in children younger than 14 years. The weekly number of newly reported cases has been declining since early August.

Since the number of cases reported each week has fallen to low numbers (quite persistently below 50), the RKI will provide information only once a week on Tuesday, starting in the second week of October 2022.

== Intervention ==
=== Vaccination ===
On 30 June 2022 − with pre-publication on 21 June − the RKI recommended Imvanex smallpox vaccine for post-exposure prophylaxis (PEP), for people with high risk of infection and for people with risk of a severe course of the disease. Due to the limited resources of Imvanex there are priorisations. The Imvanex smallpox vaccine is administered subcutaneously. (Unlike the first and second generation smallpox vaccines.)

On 21 July, the Standing Committee on Vaccination (STIKO) recommended to use only one dose per person (instead of two) of the Imvanex smallpox vaccine for the time being − so that more people can be vaccinated.

Since 19 August 2022, the European Medicines Agency (EMA) also allows intradermal administration of the vaccine, which requires only one-fifth the dose amount (compared with subcutaneous administration) to induce similar antibody levels.

=== Isolation ===
The RKI recommends that persons with diagnosed mpox isolate themselves at home for at least 21 days. Isolation can be mandatory by ordinance of the "Gesundheitsamt" (local health authority). This mandatory isolation period can also apply to close contacts that are vaccinated and show no signs of infection.

== Cumulative number of cases ==
In order to restrict the links for mere case numbers there are perhaps only some links for special days (like the end of a month or days that are not archived by the Wayback machine). The RKI reports data from Monday to Friday and German press relies on this data for the overall number, so there are no new cases on Saturday or Sunday. The data can be verified with the Internet Archive ("Wayback Machine") of the webpage from the RKI, see #RKI & CDC data.

References:

- GER: 13 June, 14th,17th, 30th, 7 July, 8th, 13th, 15th, 22nd, 29th, 1 August, 2nd, 3rd, 5th, 10th, 12th, 18th, 19th, 22nd, 25th, 29th, 30th, 1 Sept., 6th, 9th, 13th, 16th, 19th, 21 Sept., 23rd, 27th, 30th, Oct. 4th, Oct. 11th, 18th, 25th, Nov. 1st, 8th, 22nd
- UK: 2022–2023 mpox outbreak in the United Kingdom#History, rev. 8 July 2022
- U.S.: 2022–2023 mpox outbreak in the United States#Timeline, rev. 8 Oct. 2022
- FRA: 2022–2023 mpox outbreak in France#Cases, rev. 8 Oct. 2022
- Berlin: 9 June, 13 June, 20 June, June 28, 5 July, 19 July, 5 August, 17th, 26th, 31th, 21 Sept., 27 Sept.

Weekly new cases

Note: In early October 2022 change in the time period since RKI will now provide information only once a week on Tuesday.

== See also ==
- Non-replicating smallpox vaccine
- 2022–2023 mpox outbreak
- 2022–2023 mpox outbreak in Europe
  - 2022–2023 mpox outbreak in Austria
  - 2022–2023 mpox outbreak in France
  - 2022–2023 mpox outbreak in Italy
  - 2022–2023 mpox outbreak in the Netherlands
  - 2022–2023 mpox outbreak in Portugal
  - 2022–2023 mpox outbreak in Spain
  - 2022–2023 mpox outbreak in Switzerland
  - 2022–2023 mpox outbreak in the United Kingdom
