= 2022–2023 mpox outbreak in Colombia =

2022–2023 outbreak of viral disease in Colombia

- Confirmed and suspected cases by department.
- Disease: Mpox
- Pathogen: Monkeypox virus (West African clade)
- Location: Colombia
- Index case: Bogotá
- Arrival date: June 23, 2022–present (4 years, 4 months, 3 weeks and 5 days)
- Date: As of 15 August 2022
- Confirmed cases: 938
- Recovered: 41

Government website
- National Health Institute Page (in Spanish)

The 2022–2023 mpox outbreak in Colombia is a part of the outbreak of human mpox caused by the West African clade of the monkeypox virus. The outbreak reached Colombia on 23 June 2022.

== Background ==
Mpox, originally known as monkeypox, is an infectious viral disease that can occur in humans and other animals. Symptoms include a rash that forms blisters and then crusts over, as well as fever and swollen lymph nodes. The illness is usually mild, and most infected individuals recover within a few weeks without treatment. The time from exposure to the onset of symptoms ranges from three to seventeen days, and symptoms typically last from two to four weeks. However, cases may be severe, especially in children, pregnant women, or people with suppressed immune systems.

The disease is caused by the monkeypox virus, a zoonotic virus in the genus Orthopoxvirus. The variola virus, which causes smallpox, is also in this genus. Human-to-human transmission can occur through direct contact with infected skin or body fluids, including sexual contact. People remain infectious from the onset of symptoms until all the lesions have scabbed and healed. The virus may spread from infected animals through handling infected meat or via bites or scratches. Diagnosis can be confirmed by polymerase chain reaction (PCR) testing a lesion for the virus's DNA.

Vaccination is recommended for those at high risk of infection. No vaccine has been developed specifically against mpox, but smallpox vaccines have been found to be effective. There is no specific treatment for the disease, so the aim of treatment is to manage the symptoms and prevent complications. Antiviral drugs such as tecovirimat can be used to treat mpox, although their effectiveness has not been proven.

In May 2022, the World Health Organization (WHO) made an emergency announcement of the existence of a multi-country outbreak of mpox, a viral disease then commonly known as "monkeypox". The initial cluster of cases was found in the United Kingdom, where the first case was detected in London on 6 May 2022 in a patient with a recent travel history from Nigeria where the disease has been endemic. On 16 May, the UK Health Security Agency (UKHSA) confirmed four new cases with no link to travel to a country where mpox is endemic. Subsequently, cases have been reported from many countries and regions. The outbreak marked the first time mpox had spread widely outside Central and West Africa. The disease had been circulating and evolving in human hosts over several years before the outbreak and was caused by the clade IIb variant of the virus.

On 23 July 2022, the director-general of the WHO, Tedros Adhanom Ghebreyesus, declared the outbreak a public health emergency of international concern (PHEIC), stating that "we have an outbreak that has spread around the world rapidly, through new modes of transmission, about which we understand too little". A global response to the outbreak included public awareness campaigns in order to reduce spread of the disease, and repurposing of smallpox vaccines.

== History ==
=== May 2022 ===
As of May, the Colombian Ministry of Health was taking follow-up and control measures. The Director of Epidemiology and Demography of the Ministry of Health, Claudia Cuellar, informed the Colombian population about how mpox is spread through people, and she spoke about the clinical presentation of the virus and international health regulations. Health authorities in the Department of Norte de Santander have been on alert, since the department is a border area where people pass between Colombia and Venezuela.

=== June 2022 ===
On June 23, 2022, the Colombian Ministry of Health confirmed three cases of mpox, specifically two in the city of Bogotá and one in Medellín. The two cases reported in Bogota were of people who had traveled to Europe. The first case identified in Medellin was a person who had been infected while traveling to the European city of Barcelona in Spain.

=== July 2022 ===
On July 8, the National Institute of Health confirmed a new case of the disease in Bogota from a person who had been in contact with an infected person from Italy when they had traveled to Europe. On July 23, following the follow-up of several cases, health authorities began an extensive surveillance phase. On the same day, the National Institute of Health confirmed that the number of cases in the country reached 10. On July 25, the first case of a person who had been in Argentina was reported in the department of Cundinamarca, specifically in the municipality of Cajicá. On July 29, the first case was detected in Pereira, capital of the department of Risaralda. On July 30, the National Institute of Health confirmed the first case in the department of Valle del Cauca, specifically in the city of Cartago located in the north of the department.

=== August 2022 ===
On August 1, the Mayor's Office of Cali City opened a hotline to receive information when a person reports suspected cases of this disease. On August 3, the first case was confirmed in the Department of La Guajira of a man who had traveled to Bogotá. The case was detected in the municipality of Albania, which is located in the center of the department. After the first case was detected in La Guajira, health authorities in the neighboring department of Cesar increased their alert. The department's health secretary, Guillermo Girón, indicated that prevention measures should be increased due to the proximity to La Guajira. On August 4, the first case was confirmed in the city of Bucaramanga, capital of the department of Santander. On the same day, the first case was registered in the department of Tolima, specifically in the capital city of Ibagué, of a person who had traveled to the United States. On August 5, the first case was confirmed in the capital of the department of Bolívar, Cartagena. On August 11, the first case of this disease was detected in Popayán, capital of the Cauca department. On August 12, the first case of mpox in Riohacha, capital of La Guajira, was confirmed. On August 15, the first case was confirmed in the city of Cúcuta, capital of the department of Norte de Santander, in a man who had traveled to Mexico and the United States. On the same day, the first case was reported in Barranquilla, capital city of the Atlántico department. On August 16, the first case was reported in Cali, capital city of the Valle del Cauca department. On August 17, the first case was confirmed in the capital of the department of Quindío, Armenia. On August 20, the first case was reported in the city of Villavicencio, capital of the Meta department. On August 31, the José María Córdova airport carried out the first simulation in the country in order to deal with contagions of the disease. On August 26, the first one was confirmed in the department of Sucre, specifically in the municipality of Tolú in the western part of the department. On August 29, the first case was confirmed in Tunja, capital of the department of Boyacá.

=== September 2022 ===
On September 7, the health authorities of the department of Cesar confirmed the first case in the department, specifically in Valledupar. On September 9, the first case was confirmed in the capital of Putumayo, Mocoa, according to Adriana Medicis, health secretary of the departmental government, explained that the case was a person residing in Mocoa. Also on the same day, the first case was confirmed in the city of Neiva, the capital of the Huila department.

== Vaccination ==
In August 2022, the Colombian government requested from the Pan American Health Organization the vaccines to immunize the country's population. Doctor Gina Tambini, who is Colombia's representative for both the World Health Organization and the Pan American Health Organization, explained about the vaccination scheme that will be implemented in the country, which will first prioritize people who have presented symptoms of the disease or have been close to positive cases.

== Cumulative Case Progress ==
=== By department ===
2022–2023 mpox outbreak by department
	Region	INS	Press sources	
	Region	Cases	Cases	Ref(s).
(Colombia)	Colombia	938	933	—
(Antioquia Department)	Antioquía	125	125 (Note: 86 in Medellín and cases in Bello, Caldas, Copacabana, El Carmen de Viboral, Envigado, Girardota, Guarne, La Ceja y Sabaneta)	
(Atlántico Department)	Atlántico	7	7 (Note: 5 in Barranquilla, 1 in Soledad & 1 in Malambo)	
(Bogotá)	Bogotá	697	697	
(Boyacá Department)	Boyacá	1	1 (Note: One in Tunja)	
(Bolívar Department)	Bolívar	6	8 (Note: 7 in Cartagena & 1 in Turbaco)	
(Caldas Department)	Caldas	2	2 (Note: 2 in Manizales)	
(Cauca Department)	Cauca	2	2 (Note: One in Popayán)	
(Cesar Department)	Cesar	—	2 (Note: 2 in Valledupar)	
(Cundinamarca Department)	Cundinamarca	21	21 (Note: One in Cajicá)	
(Huila Department)	Huila	1	1 (Note: One in Neiva)	
(La Guajira Department)	La Guajira	2	2 (Note: 1 in Riohacha & 1 in Albania)	
(Magdalena Department)	Magdalena	2	2 (Note: 1 in Santa Marta & 1 in Fundación)	
(Meta Department)	Meta	3	2 (Note: Two in Villavicencio)	
(Norte de Santander Department)	Norte de Santander	1	1 (Note: One in Cúcuta)	
(Quindío Department)	Quindío	2	2 (Note: One in Armenia)	
(Putumayo Department)	Putumayo	—	1 (Note: One in Mocoa)	
(Risaralda Department)	Risaralda	6	6 (Note: 6 in Pereira)	
(Santander Department)	Santander	8	8 (Note: 7 in Bucaramanga and 1 in Girón)	
(Sucre Department)	Sucre	1	1 (Note: One in Tolú)	
(Tolima Department)	Tolima	14	14 (Note: All confirmed cases are in Ibagué)	
(Valle del Cauca Department)	Valle del Cauca	37	26 (Note: 19 in Cali and 7 in other parts of the department)	
Updated: September 11, 2022
