= 2022–2023 mpox outbreak in Chile =

Ongoing viral outbreak

- Confirmed and suspected cases by region.
- Disease: Mpox
- Pathogen: Monkeypox virus (West African clade)
- Location: Chile
- Index case: Santiago de Chile
- Arrival date: June 17, 2022–present (3 years, 10 months and 3 weeks)
- Confirmed cases: 1,442
- Suspected cases^{‡}: 26
- Hospitalized cases: 400
- Recovered: 1,442
- Deaths: 3

Government website
- Monkeypox Epidemiological Situation Report (in Spanish)

The 2022–2023 mpox outbreak in Chile is a part of the outbreak of human mpox caused by the West African clade of the monkeypox virus. The outbreak reached Chile on 17 June 2022.

== Background ==
Mpox (/ˈɛmpɒks/, EM-poks; originally known as monkeypox) is an infectious viral disease that can occur in humans and other animals. Symptoms include a rash that forms blisters and then crusts over, as well as fever and swollen lymph nodes. The illness is usually mild, and most infected individuals recover within a few weeks without treatment. The time from exposure to the onset of symptoms ranges from three to seventeen days, and symptoms typically last from two to four weeks. However, cases may be severe, especially in children, pregnant women, or people with suppressed immune systems.

The disease is caused by the monkeypox virus, a zoonotic virus in the genus Orthopoxvirus. The variola virus, which causes smallpox, is also in this genus. Human-to-human transmission can occur through direct contact with infected skin or body fluids, including sexual contact. People remain infectious from the onset of symptoms until all the lesions have scabbed and healed. The virus may spread from infected animals through handling infected meat or via bites or scratches. Diagnosis can be confirmed by polymerase chain reaction (PCR) testing a lesion for the virus's DNA.

Vaccination is recommended for those at high risk of infection. No vaccine has been developed specifically against mpox, but smallpox vaccines have been found to be effective. There is no specific treatment for the disease, so the aim of treatment is to manage the symptoms and prevent complications. Antiviral drugs such as tecovirimat can be used to treat mpox, although their effectiveness has not been proven.

An ongoing outbreak of mpox was confirmed on May 6, 2022, beginning with a British resident who, after travelling to Nigeria (where the disease is endemic), presented symptoms consistent with mpox on April 29, 2022. The resident returned to the United Kingdom on May 4, creating the country's index case of the outbreak. The origin of several of the cases of mpox in the United Kingdom is unknown. Some monitors saw community transmission taking place in the London area as of mid-May, but it has been suggested that cases were already spreading in Europe in the previous months.

== Transmission ==
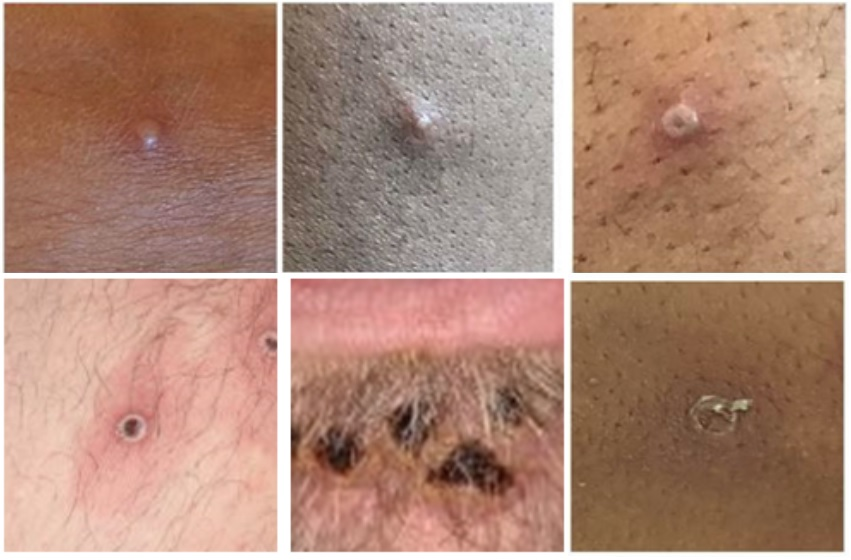
Stages of lesion development.

A large portion of those infected were believed to have not recently traveled to areas of Africa where mpox is normally found, such as Nigeria, the Democratic Republic of the Congo as well as central and western Africa. It is believed to be transmitted by close contact with sick people, with extra caution for those individuals with lesions on their skin or genitals, along with their bedding and clothing. The CDC has also stated that individuals should avoid contact and consumption of dead animals such as rats, squirrels, monkeys and apes along with wild game or lotions derived from animals in Africa.

In addition to more common symptoms, such as fever, headache, swollen lymph nodes, and rashes or lesions, some patients have also experienced proctitis, an inflammation of the rectum lining. CDC has also warned clinicians to not rule out mpox in patients with sexually transmitted infections since there have been reports of co-infections with syphilis, gonorrhea, chlamydia, and herpes.

== History ==
The first case of infection was recorded on June 17 in Santiago de Chile after an adult with a history of travel to Europe presented symptoms

== Statistics ==
Cases in Metropolitan Region

Cases of mpox 23-09-22
Region	Cases
Santiago Metropolitan Region	732
Araucanía	10
Antofagasta	14
Valparaíso Region	25
O'Higgins	6
Coquimbo	21
Los Lagos Region	3
Maule Region	6 (+2)
Biobío Region	14
Los Ríos Region	2 (+1)
Ñuble Region	2 (+1)

Every 4 days (Tuesday and Friday)
Date	Total Cases	Cases in RM	Cases outside of RM	New / daily avg
02-08-22	68	62	6	—
05-08-22	91	83	9 (+3)	5
09-08-22	126	116	10 (+1)	8
12-08-22	141	130	11 (+1)	3
15-08-22	189	176	13 (+2)	12
19-08-22	207	194	13	4
23-08-22	270	194	13	15
26-08-22	344	317	27 (+14)	18
30-08-22	381	354	27	9
02-09-22	450	404	46 (+19)	17
06-09-22	484	—	46	8
23-09-22	842	732	110	—
