= 2022–2023 mpox outbreak in Mexico =

Ongoing viral outbreak

- Confirmed cases by state.
- Disease: Mpox
- Pathogen: Monkeypox virus (West African clade)
- Location: Mexico
- Index case: Mexico City, Mexico
- Arrival date: May 28, 2022 (3 years, 11 months, and 22 days)
- Date: December 8, 2022
- Confirmed cases: 4055
- Deaths: 30

The 2022–2023 mpox outbreak in Mexico is part of the larger outbreak of human mpox caused by the West African clade of the monkeypox virus. Mexico is the twenty-fourth country outside of Africa to experience an endemic mpox outbreak. The first case was reported in Mexico City, Mexico, on May 28, 2022. As of December 8th 2022, Mexico had confirmed a total of 3455 cases in all 32 states and 4 deaths.

== Background ==
Mpox (/ˈɛmpɒks/, EM-poks; originally known as monkeypox) is an infectious viral disease that can occur in humans and other animals. Symptoms include a rash that forms blisters and then crusts over, as well as fever and swollen lymph nodes. The illness is usually mild, and most infected individuals recover within a few weeks without treatment. The time from exposure to the onset of symptoms ranges from three to seventeen days, and symptoms typically last from two to four weeks. However, cases may be severe, especially in children, pregnant women, or people with suppressed immune systems.

The disease is caused by the monkeypox virus, a zoonotic virus in the genus Orthopoxvirus. The variola virus, which causes smallpox, is also in this genus. Human-to-human transmission can occur through direct contact with infected skin or body fluids, including sexual contact. People remain infectious from the onset of symptoms until all the lesions have scabbed and healed. The virus may spread from infected animals through handling infected meat or via bites or scratches. Diagnosis can be confirmed by polymerase chain reaction (PCR) testing a lesion for the virus's DNA.

Vaccination is recommended for those at high risk of infection. No vaccine has been developed specifically against mpox, but smallpox vaccines have been found to be effective. There is no specific treatment for the disease, so the aim of treatment is to manage the symptoms and prevent complications. Antiviral drugs such as tecovirimat can be used to treat mpox, although their effectiveness has not been proven.

An ongoing outbreak of mpox was confirmed on May 6, 2022, beginning with a British resident who, after travelling to Nigeria (where the disease is endemic), presented symptoms consistent with mpox on April 29, 2022. The resident returned to the United Kingdom on May 4, creating the country's index case of the outbreak. The origin of several of the cases of mpox in the United Kingdom is unknown. Some monitors saw community transmission taking place in the London area as of mid-May, but it has been suggested that cases were already spreading in Europe in the previous months.

== Transmission ==
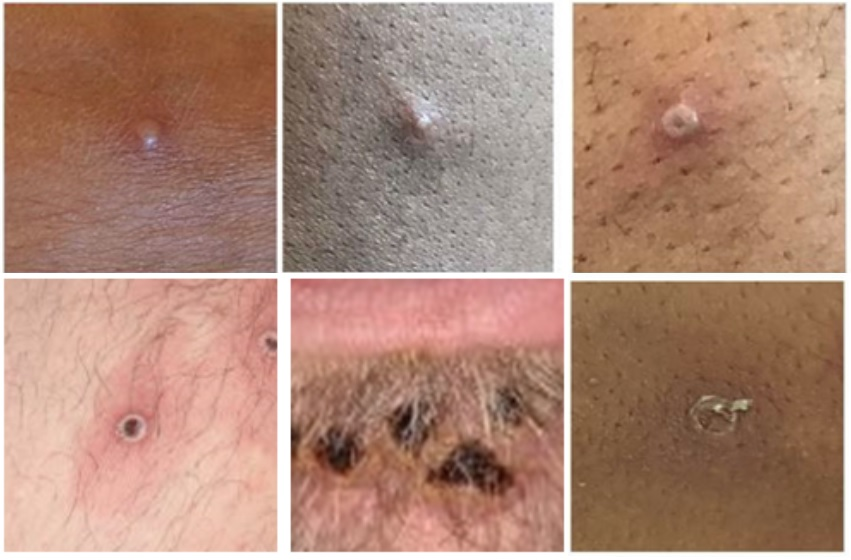
Stages of lesion development. Picture taken by Dr O.O. Afuye on 15 September 2019.

A large portion of those infected were believed to have not recently traveled to areas of Africa where mpox is normally found, such as Nigeria, the Democratic Republic of the Congo as well as central and western Africa. It is believed to be transmitted by close contact with sick people, with extra caution for those individuals with lesions on their skin or genitals, along with their bedding and clothing. The CDC has also stated that individuals should avoid contact and consumption of dead animals such as rats, squirrels, monkeys and apes along with wild game or lotions derived from animals in Africa.

In addition to more common symptoms, such as fever, headache, swollen lymph nodes, and rashes or lesions, some patients have also experienced proctitis, an inflammation of the rectum lining. CDC has also warned clinicians to not rule out mpox in patients with sexually transmitted infections since there have been reports of co-infections with syphilis, gonorrhea, chlamydia, and herpes.

== History ==
The first known case was detected in on May 28, 2022, in a 50-year-old male who resides permanently in the city of New York City, New York. He was diagnosed and hospitalized in Mexico City. There, he tested positive for mpox, becoming the first case in Mexico.

On June 14, 4 more cases were reported in Mexico in the course of a week which brought the total number of cases in the country up to 5. There were 4 cases reported in Mexico City and 1 confirmed in Jalisco.

On July 5, over the course of 3 weeks, 22 more cases were reported, which brought the total number of cases in the country up to 27. The only counties that reported cases were Mexico City and Jalisco. Other counties were not affected at the time.

On July 27, after 3 weeks, 33 more infections were confirmed, which increased the total number of cases in the country up to 60. Cases had been reported across 11 regions in Mexico.

On August 2, after 1 week, 31 more cases were confirmed, which rose the total number of cases from 60 to 91. Cases had been reported in 4 more regions, which brought the overall number of regions and territories affected by mpox up to 15.

On August 9, over the course of 1 week, 56 more mpox cases were reported, which brought the total number of cases in the country up to 147. Cases had been reported in 3 more regions, which rose the overall number of regions and territories affected by mpox up to 18.

On August 15, in the course of just 6 days, 105 greater mpox cases had been confirmed, which rose the overall number of infections from 147 to 252. Mpox infections had been reported in 2 more regions, which brought the total number of regions and territories affected by mpox up to 20.

As of August 18, there is currently 252 confirmed cases with 107 suspected cases in the country.

== Responses and reactions ==
Hospitals have also begun making their own preparations to help control the current mpox outbreak, including screening patients, increasing decontamination and cleaning procedures, and wearing appropriate safety gear (Personal protective equipment / Medical gown) when interacting with infected patients.

Mexico has also responded to the outbreak. Mexican health authorities have posted notices in clinics and hospitals for the purpose of identifying suspected cases and infections in the country. In addition, the Ministry of Health has issued an epidemiological alert on 26 May 2022.

== See also ==
- 2022–2023 mpox outbreak
