= MVA-B =

MVA-B, or Modified Vaccinia Ankara B, is an HIV vaccine created to give immune resistance to infection by the human immunodeficiency virus. It was developed by a team of Spanish researchers at the Spanish National Research Council's Biotechnology National Centre headed by Dr. Mariano Esteban. The vaccine is based on the Modified vaccinia Ankara (MVA) virus used during the 1970s to help eradicate the smallpox virus. The B in the name "refers to HIV-B, the most common HIV subtype in Europe". It has been stated by Dr. Esteban that, in the future, the vaccine could potentially reduce the virulence of HIV to a "minor chronic infection akin to herpes".

== History ==
=== Non-human testing ===
The vaccine was originally tested on a number of mice and macaque monkeys in 2008 against the Simian immunodeficiency virus (SIV) and it was found to be successful in creating an immune system response to SIV infection.

=== Phase I testing ===
The initial testing on human subjects was conducted on a testing pool of thirty HIV-free individuals. Six of the pool were given a placebo and had no results. Of the other twenty-four individuals, twenty-two exhibited a "very strong immunological response against the HIV virus", bringing the success rate of the testing to 92%. The immune reaction that the successful testers exhibited lasted for a period close to a year for 85% of the testers, who had no "significant secondary effects". It was also shown that, from blood tests in the 48th week after administration of the vaccine, in 72.5% of the volunteers, "specific antibodies" had formed to combat possible HIV infection. Specifically, the blood tests revealed that the immune system production of CD4+ T lymphocytes and CD8+ T lymphocytes were at 38.5% and 69.2% each for the testers given the vaccine, while the amounts in the group given the placebo remained at 0%.

The next step with the vaccine within Phase I testing is to conduct a trial with HIV-positive testers, in order to determine if there is a "therapeutical effect of the vaccine" on those already infected with the virus. A randomized controlled trial was published in February of 2015 that involved 30 HIV infected patients, 20 given doses of MVA-B and 10 given a placebo, which showed that the vaccine was capable of increasing T cell response for Gag-specific T cells. This, however, did not improve immune responses in the long run or prevention of resurgence of viral loads after vaccine treatment was concluded. A followup study published in October of 2017 showed that subsequent immunization with the vaccine in HIV positive patients that had received MVA-B four years prior saw a larger immune response and production of binding and neutralizing antibodies to HIV replication.

== Virology ==
In order to create the vaccine, researchers took the prior Modified Vaccinia Ankara virus and added four genes from the HIV genome, specifically those titled Gag, Pol, Nef and Env. An improved version of the recombinant viral vector, which was titled MVA-B ΔA40R, was created and published in February of 2020 that included a deletion of the A40R gene in the vaccine genome. It is unknown what function the A40 protein has, other than it causing protein accumulation in the cell membrane, but deletion of it resulted in a vaccine that boosted transcription and expression levels of interferon (IFN)-β, IFN-induced genes, and chemokines in exposed macrophages.

== See also ==
- Antiretroviral drug
