= 2022–2023 mpox outbreak in Peru =

2022 outbreak of viral disease in Peru

- Confirmed cases by province.
- Disease: Mpox
- Pathogen: Monkeypox virus (West African clade)
- Location: Peru
- Index case: Lima
- Arrival date: June 26, 2022–present (3 years, 10 months and 3 weeks)
- Date: As of 19 September 2022
- Confirmed cases: 3,812 (MINSA); 2,884 (DIRESAs/GERESAs/Press sources)
- Suspected cases^{‡}: 41 (DIRESAs/GERESAs/Press sources)
- Recovered: 3,762 (MINSA); 809 (DIRESAs/GERESAs/Press sources)
- Deaths: 20 (MINSA); 10 (DIRESAs/GERESAs/Press sources)

Government website
- What is monkeypox? Mpox Situation Room (Both websites in Spanish)

The 2022–2023 mpox outbreak in Peru is a part of the outbreak of human mpox caused by the West African clade of the monkeypox virus. The outbreak reached Peru on 26 June 2022.

== Background ==
Mpox (/ˈɛmpɒks/, EM-poks; originally known as monkeypox) is an infectious viral disease that can occur in humans and other animals. Symptoms include a rash that forms blisters and then crusts over, as well as fever and swollen lymph nodes. The illness is usually mild, and most infected individuals recover within a few weeks without treatment. The time from exposure to the onset of symptoms ranges from three to seventeen days, and symptoms typically last from two to four weeks. However, cases may be severe, especially in children, pregnant women, or people with suppressed immune systems.

The disease is caused by the monkeypox virus, a zoonotic virus in the genus Orthopoxvirus. The variola virus, which causes smallpox, is also in this genus. Human-to-human transmission can occur through direct contact with infected skin or body fluids, including sexual contact. People remain infectious from the onset of symptoms until all the lesions have scabbed and healed. The virus may spread from infected animals through handling infected meat or via bites or scratches. Diagnosis can be confirmed by polymerase chain reaction (PCR) testing a lesion for the virus's DNA.

Vaccination is recommended for those at high risk of infection. No vaccine has been developed specifically against mpox, but smallpox vaccines have been found to be effective. There is no specific treatment for the disease, so the aim of treatment is to manage the symptoms and prevent complications. Antiviral drugs such as tecovirimat can be used to treat mpox, although their effectiveness has not been proven.

In May 2022, the World Health Organization (WHO) made an emergency announcement of the existence of a multi-country outbreak of mpox, a viral disease then commonly known as "monkeypox". The initial cluster of cases was found in the United Kingdom, where the first case was detected in London on 6 May 2022 in a patient with a recent travel history from Nigeria where the disease has been endemic. On 16 May, the UK Health Security Agency (UKHSA) confirmed four new cases with no link to travel to a country where mpox is endemic. Subsequently, cases have been reported from many countries and regions. The outbreak marked the first time mpox had spread widely outside Central and West Africa. The disease had been circulating and evolving in human hosts over several years before the outbreak and was caused by the clade IIb variant of the virus.

On 23 July 2022, the director-general of the WHO, Tedros Adhanom Ghebreyesus, declared the outbreak a public health emergency of international concern (PHEIC), stating that "we have an outbreak that has spread around the world rapidly, through new modes of transmission, about which we understand too little". A global response to the outbreak included public awareness campaigns in order to reduce spread of the disease, and repurposing of smallpox vaccines.

== History ==
The first suspected case of infection in the country was reported on 30 May 2022, when health authorities in the department of Piura reported the identification of a 70-year-old patient who presented symptoms compatible with mpox and was isolated in the intensive care unit (ICU) of the Santa Rosa Hospital (Piura).

== Statistics ==
=== By region ===
2022-2023 mpox outbreak by region
	Region	MINSA	DIRESAs/GERESAs/Press sources				
	Region	Cases	Cases	Recovered	Suspected	Discarded	Reference(s)
(Peru)	Peru	3,812	2,884	809	41	551	—
	Amazonas	—	—	—	—	—	—
	Ancash	14	6	—	—	—	
	Apurímac	—	—	—	—	—	—
	Arequipa	149	100	—	20	56	
	Ayacucho	10	1	—	—	24	
	Cajamarca	3	2	—	—	—	
	Callao	261	248	—	1	119	—
	Cusco	18	16	—	—	74	
	Huancavelica	—	—	—	—	—	—
	Huánuco	5	5	6	—	40	—
	Ica	39	30	—	—	—	—
Junin	Junín	10	10	—	—	—	
	La Libertad	165	165	163	3	—	
Lambayeque Department	Lambayeque	44	21	—	3	76	
	Lima (P)	2,889	2,172	621	—	—	—
	Lima (R)	52	1	—	2	—	
	Loreto	13	6	—	—	6	
Madre de Dios Department	Madre de Dios	7	1	—	—	—	
	Moquegua	6	1	—	—	6	
Pasco Department	Pasco	—	—	—	—	—	—
	Piura	52	39	—	3	5	
	Puno	1	1	—	—	—	
	San Martín	25	24	—	3	65	
	Tacna	23	24	—	—	92	
	Tumbes	1	1	—	—	35	
	Ucayali	25	24	23	—	—	
Updated: July 12, 2023 · History of cases: Peru

=== By date ===
Cumulative confirmed cases of mpox by day
MINSA
Day	Confirmed	Recovered	Deaths	Ref(s).
10 July 2022	29	—	—	
11 July 2022	No daily report published.			
12 July 2022	36	—	—	
13 July 2022	46	—	—	
14 July 2022	55	—	—	
15 July 2022	64	4	—	
16 July 2022	78	4	—	
17 July 2022	92	5	—	
18 July 2022	95	5	—	
19 July 2022	112	12	—	
20 July 2022	126	16	—	
21 July 2022	143	20	—	
22 July 2022	157	24	—	
23 July 2022	183	25	—	
24 July 2022	203	27	—	
25 July 2022	208	27	—	
26 July 2022	224	35	—	
27 July 2022	251	43	—	
28 July 2022	269	54	—	
29 July 2022	275	68	—	
30 July 2022	282	77	—	
31 July 2022	305	91	—	
1 August 2022	313	99	—	
2 August 2022	324	108	—	
3 August 2022	340	120	—	
4 August 2022	396	139	—	
5 August 2022	409	159	—	
6 August 2022	No daily report published.			
7 August 2022	505	185	—	
8 August 2022	547	202	—	
9 August 2022	583	221	—	
10 August 2022	632	239	—	
11 August 2022	653	260	—	
12 August 2022	676	260	—	
13 August 2022	712	278	—	
14 August 2022	775	308	—	
15 August 2022	834	321	—	
16 August 2022	867	352	—	
17 August 2022	891	374	—	
18 August 2022	937	410	—	
19 August 2022	1,022	448	—	
20 August 2022	1,068	477	—	
21 August 2022	1,128	519	—	
22 August 2022	1,188	546	—	
23 August 2022	1,207	599	—	
24 August 2022	1,257	630	—	
25 August 2022	1,300	674	—	
26 August 2022	1,342	712	—	
27 August 2022	1,382	742	—	
28 August 2022	1,434	784	—	
29 August 2022	1,463	812	—	
30 August 2022	1,496	864	—	
31 August 2022	1,531	898	—	
1 September 2022	1,546	931	—	
2 September 2022	1,590	986	—	
3 September 2022	1,619	1,034	—	
4 September 2022	1,661	1,079	—	
5 September 2022	1,724	1,126	—	
6 September 2022	1,726	1,190	—	
7 September 2022	1,760	1,228	—	
8 September 2022	1,808	1,276	—	
9 September 2022	1,844	1,329	—	
10 September 2022	1,896	1,374	—	
11 September 2022	1,937	1,424	—	
12 September 2022	1,964	1,459	—	
13 September 2022	1,989	1,504	—	
14 September 2022			—	
15 September 2022			—	
16 September 2022			—	
17 September 2022			—	
18 September 2022			—	
19 September 2022	Waiting for daily update.			
Updated: July 12, 2023 · History of cases: Peru

== See also ==
- 2022-2023 mpox outbreak
