= Modified vaccinia Ankara =

Vaccine against smallpox and mpox

Vaccine description
- Target: Smallpox, mpox
- Vaccine type: Attenuated

Clinical data
- Trade names: Imvanex, Imvamune, Jynneos
- Other names: MVA
- AHFS/Drugs.com: Professional Drug Facts
- Routes of administration: Subcutaneous, Intradermal
- ATC code: J07BX (WHO)

Legal status
- Legal status: CA: ℞-only / Schedule D; UK: POM (Prescription only); US: ℞-only; EU: Rx-only

Identifiers
- ChemSpider: none

Modified vaccinia Ankara (MVA) is an attenuated (weakened) strain of the vaccinia virus. It is being used as a vaccine (called MVA-BN, brand names: Imvanex in the EU, Imvamune in Canada, and Jynneos in the US) against smallpox and mpox, having fewer side effects than smallpox vaccines derived from other poxviruses.

This third-generation smallpox vaccine has the advantage that it cannot reproduce complete virions in human cells, "the block of the MVA life cycle occurs at the step of virion assembly resulting in assembly of immature virus particles that are not released from the infected cell."

By inserting antigen genes into its genome, modified vaccinia Ankara virus is also used as an experimental viral vector for vaccines against non-poxvirus diseases.

== Development as a poxvirus vaccine ==
The traditional smallpox vaccine, which was used in the smallpox eradication campaign 1958–1977, consists of a live vaccinia virus which can replicate in humans but usually does not cause disease. It can however sometimes lead to serious side effects. Modified vaccinia Ankara virus is a highly attenuated strain of vaccinia virus that was developed in Munich, Germany between 1953 and 1968. It was produced by more than 500 serial passages of vaccinia virus (from a wild strain discovered by the Turkish vaccine institute of Ankara called the chorioallantois vaccinia Ankara) in chicken embryo fibroblasts. After testing the safety and effectiveness as a vaccine, it was approved in Germany in 1977, and then given to about 120,000 people until 1980, when smallpox vaccinations ended in Germany. No severe adverse events were seen during this time.

It was later found that through the passaging, modified vaccinia virus Ankara had lost about 10% of the ancestral vaccinia genome and with it the ability to replicate efficiently in most mammalian cells. While it can enter host cells, express its genes and replicate its genome, it fails to assemble virus particles that are released from the cell.

The vaccine was further developed and manufactured by the Danish company Bavarian Nordic, resulting in the vaccine MVA-BN, which is unable to replicate in human cells. The vaccine is given subcutaneously in two doses, at least 28 days apart. It was approved in Canada in 2013, as a smallpox vaccine and in 2020 also against mpox and related orthopoxvirus infections. It was approved in the European Union in 2013, as a vaccine against smallpox and in the US in September 2019, against smallpox and mpox. On 13 September 2024, the WHO has granted prequalification status to the MVA-BN vaccine, as the first vaccine approved for use against mpox.

In August 2022, the US Food and Drug Administration (FDA) gave emergency use authorization for intradermal (rather than subcutaneous) mpox vaccination using a lower dose of Jynneos, which would increase the number of available doses up to five-fold. The vaccination would still be given in two doses, 28 days apart. A 2015 study had tested a regimen of one-fifth dose given intradermally.

== Development as a viral vector ==
Modified vaccinia Ankara strains engineered to express foreign genes are vectors for production of recombinant proteins, the most common being a vaccine delivery system for antigens. A recombinant MVA-based vector for vaccination with different fluorescent reporter genes was developed, which indicate the progress of genetic recombination with the transgene of an antigen (green, colorless, red).

In animal models, MVA-based vector vaccines have been found to be immunogenic and protective against various infectious agents including immunodeficiency viruses, influenza, parainfluenza, measles virus, flaviviruses, tuberculosis, Plasmodium parasites as well as certain cancers.

MVA-B is an experimental vaccine to protect against HIV infection, produced by inserting HIV genes into the genome of modified vaccinia virus Ankara. In phase I clinical trials in 2013, it was found to be safe but produced only moderate levels of anti-HIV immunity. After removing am immunomodulatory gene called A40R from MVA, the vaccine produced an improved immune response in mice.

== Research ==
The genome of both the chicken-adapted MVA and its fully virulent ancestor CVA (able to replicate in both mammalian and avian cells) have been sequenced. Comparison shows six major deletions and numerous other mutations. Some mutant MVA strains that can replicated in mammalian cells have since been created, providing insight into the genetic basis of MVA's avirulence and the functions of poxvirus genes in general.

A US Centers for Disease Control and Prevention (CDC) analysis of the vaccination status of 5402 individuals who had mpox infections during the summer of 2022 showed that unvaccinated people appeared to be 14 times more likely to be infected than those with a single (of two recommended) doses; the results were noted to be admittedly preliminary.
