= Single territorial collectivity =

Chartered subdivision of France

Single territorial collectivity (map not to scale)

A single territorial collectivity (French: collectivité territoriale unique, French pronunciation: [kɔlɛktivite teʁitɔʁjal ynik]) is a chartered subdivision of France that exercises the powers of both a region and a department. This subdivision was introduced in Mayotte in 2011, in French Guiana and Martinique in 2015, and in Corsica in 2018.

The nature of a French single territorial collectivity is set forth in Articles 72 and 73 of the French Constitution of 1958 (as amended since), which provides for local autonomy within limits prescribed by law.

Out of the five overseas departments and regions of France, only French Guiana, Martinique, and Mayotte opted to merge their local councils into a single assembly. Guadeloupe and Réunion voted to retain the traditional dual administrative structure, maintaining distinct regional and departmental governments.

== See also ==
- Administrative divisions of France
- Corsican autonomy
