= Bavarian Nordic =

Danish pharmaceutical company

Bavarian Nordic A/S
- Type: Public
- Traded as: Nasdaq Copenhagen: BAVA; OMXC25CAP component; OTC Markets: BVNRY
- ISIN: DK0015998017
- Industry: Biotechnology
- Founded: 1994; 32 years ago
- Headquarters: Hellerup, Denmark
- Key people: Tarja Stenvall (president and CEO)
- Products: Imvanex, Imvamune, Jynneos, Rabipur/RabAvert, Encepur, Vivotif, Vaxchora, Mvabea, Vimkunya
- Revenue: 6.244 billion kr. (2025)
- Total assets: 14.955 billion kr. (2025)
- Total equity: 12.870 billion kr. (2025)
- Number of employees: 1,795 (2025)
- Website: bavarian-nordic.com

Bavarian Nordic A/S is a Danish biotechnology company focused on the development, manufacturing and commercialization of vaccines. The company is headquartered in Hellerup, Denmark, with manufacturing facilities in Kvistgård, Denmark and Thörishaus near Bern, Switzerland. The company has research and development facilities in Martinsried, Germany, as well as offices in USA, Canada, and France. The company uses viral vectors and virus-like particles in its research and development.

In July 2025, the company agreed to be acquired by private equity firms Permira and Nordic Capital for 19 billion kr. (approximately US$3 billion). However, in November, the acquisition failed to gain sufficient support from Bavarian Nordic's shareholders, leading to its termination.

In 2026, Bavarian Nordic was ranked second in Time Magazine's World Most Impactful Companies.

== Technologies ==
=== MVA-BN ===
MVA-BN is a proprietary technology developed by Bavarian Nordic. It is derived from the Modified vaccinia Ankara virus. MVA-BN is characterized by the inability to replicate in human cells, contrary to other vaccinia-based vaccines, which may replicate in humans, thus potentially causing severe and life-threatening side effects. Developed as the non-replicating smallpox and mpox vaccine, MVA-BN is approved in Canada as Imvamune, in the European Union, as Imvanex, and the United States as Jynneos. The vaccine was supplied for emergency use to the U.S. Strategic National Stockpile as well as other government stockpiles.

The vaccine is being deployed worldwide to combat the 2022 mpox outbreak, leading to concerns over vaccine nationalism and hoarding by countries with pre-existing contracts.

== Ebola vaccine development and production ==
The company has worked for several years with the NIAID on the development of a filovirus vaccine for Ebola and Marburg hemorrhagic fever diseases. In October 2014, following a successful pre-clinical demonstration of the combination vaccine regimen of its multivalent MVA-BN Filovirus vaccine and Crucell/Janssen's AdVac technology based on adenoviral vectors, Bavarian Nordic joined efforts with Crucell Holland B.V., one of the Janssen Pharmaceuticals companies of Johnson & Johnson to develop and manufacture this vaccine regimen intended for emergency use to help contain the outbreak in West Africa. In January 2015, the company had produced the first 400,000 doses of the vaccine and the first clinical trial of the vaccine regimen was initiated in the UK, with additional trials planned in the US and Africa. It was approved for medical use in the European Union in July 2020.

== Acquisitions ==
In October 2019, it was announced that Bavarian Nordic would acquire travel vaccines Rabipur(/Rabavert) for rabies and Encepur for tick-borne encephalitis (TBE) from GlaxoSmithKline (GSK). In February 2023, it was announced that Bavarian Nordic would acquire travel vaccines Vivotif for typhoid fever and Vaxchora for cholera, in addition to a late-stage candidate for chikungunya, from Emergent BioSolutions.

== Marketed products and pipeline ==
Bavarian Nordic's marketed products and pipeline, as of June 2025.

Product	Indication	Phase	Remark
Imvanex, Imvamune, Jynneos	Smallpox, mpox and disease caused by vaccinia virus	Approved EU 2013-07 Approved Canada 2013-11 Approved US 2019-09-24	
Rabipur/RabAvert	(Pre-/post-exposure protection against) rabies	Approved	
Encepur	European (Western) tick-borne encephalitis (TBE) virus	Approved	
Mvabea	Ebola and Marburg virus	Approved EU 2020-07-01	Licensed to Janssen. One dose of Janssen's primer Zabdeno (Ad26.ZEBOV) followed 8 weeks later by a dose of Bavarian Nordic's booster Mvabea® (MVA-BN Filo) collectively constitutes Janssen's Ebola vaccine regimen.
Vimkunya	Chikungunya	Approved US 2025-02-14 Approved EU 2025-02-28	
MVA-BN WEV	Equine encephalitis virus	II	A Phase 2 clinical study is ongoing.

== Associations ==
Bavarian Nordic is a member of the Medical Countermeasures Coalition, a group of companies, academic institutions, and other organizations dedicated to building an effective medical countermeasure enterprise through sound public policy and strong public-private partnerships.

The company is a funding partner of the Bipartisan Commission on Biodefense, and a former donor to the Bipartisan Policy Center.
