= Mpox outbreak =

Mpox outbreak, monkeypox outbreak, mpox epidemic or monkeypox epidemic may refer to:

- 1958 discovery of mpox as a distinct illness in laboratory monkeys in Copenhagen, Denmark, the first recognized milestone in mpox epidemiology history
- 1964 outbreak of mpox at Rotterdam Zoo in the Netherlands (with no cases in humans)
- various dates between 1970 and present, outbreaks of human mpox in the Democratic Republic of the Congo where the disease is enzootic.
- 1971 and 2017–present outbreaks of human mpox in Nigeria
- 2003 Midwest mpox outbreak, in the United States (human infections traced to animals imported from Ghana)
- 2022–2023 mpox outbreak, a global outbreak
- 2023–2026 mpox epidemic, an international epidemic, primarily in Central Africa

== See also ==
- Mpox § Epidemiology
