= Nucleophile =

Chemical species that donates an electron pair

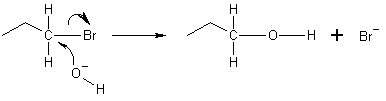
A hydroxide ion acting as a nucleophile in an S_{N}2 reaction, converting a haloalkane into an alcohol

In chemistry, a nucleophile is a chemical species that forms bonds by donating an electron pair. All molecules and ions with a free pair of electrons or at least one pi bond can act as nucleophiles. Because nucleophiles donate electrons, they are Lewis bases.

Nucleophilic describes the affinity of a nucleophile to bond with positively charged atomic nuclei. Nucleophilicity, sometimes referred to as nucleophile strength, refers to a substance's nucleophilic character and is often used to compare the affinity of atoms. Neutral nucleophilic reactions with solvents such as alcohols and water are named solvolysis. Nucleophiles may take part in nucleophilic substitution, whereby a nucleophile becomes attracted to a full or partial positive charge, and nucleophilic addition. Nucleophilicity is closely related to basicity. The difference between the two is, that basicity is a thermodynamic property (i.e. relates to an equilibrium state), but nucleophilicity is a kinetic property, which relates to rates of certain chemical reactions.

== History and etymology ==
The terms nucleophile and electrophile were introduced by Christopher Kelk Ingold in 1933, replacing the terms anionoid and cationoid proposed earlier by A. J. Lapworth in 1925. The word nucleophile is derived from nucleus and the Greek word φιλος, philos, meaning friend.

== Properties ==
In general, in a group across the periodic table, the more basic the ion (the higher the pK_{a} of the conjugate acid) the more reactive it is as a nucleophile. Within a series of nucleophiles with the same attacking element (e.g. oxygen), the order of nucleophilicity will follow basicity. Sulfur is in general a better nucleophile than oxygen.

=== Nucleophilicity ===
Many schemes attempting to quantify relative nucleophilic strength have been devised. The following empirical data have been obtained by measuring reaction rates for many reactions involving many nucleophiles and electrophiles. Nucleophiles displaying the so-called alpha effect are usually omitted in this type of treatment.

==== Swain–Scott equation ====
The first such attempt is found in the Swain–Scott equation derived in 1953:

$$\log_{10}\left(\frac{k}{k_0}\right) = sn$$

This free-energy relationship relates the pseudo first order reaction rate constant (in water at 25 °C), k, of a reaction, normalized to the reaction rate, k_{0}, of a standard reaction with water as the nucleophile, to a nucleophilic constant n for a given nucleophile and a substrate constant s that depends on the sensitivity of a substrate to nucleophilic attack (defined as 1 for methyl bromide).

This treatment results in the following values for typical nucleophilic anions: acetate 2.7, chloride 3.0, azide 4.0, hydroxide 4.2, aniline 4.5, iodide 5.0, and thiosulfate 6.4. Typical substrate constants are 0.66 for ethyl tosylate, 0.77 for β-propiolactone, 1.00 for 2,3-epoxypropanol, 0.87 for benzyl chloride, and 1.43 for benzoyl chloride.

The equation predicts that, in a nucleophilic displacement on benzyl chloride, the azide anion reacts 3000 times faster than water.

==== Ritchie equation ====
The Ritchie equation, derived in 1972, is another free-energy relationship:

$$\log_{10}\left(\frac{k}{k_0}\right) = N^+$$

where N^{+} is the nucleophile dependent parameter and k_{0} the reaction rate constant for water. In this equation, a substrate-dependent parameter like s in the Swain–Scott equation is absent. The equation states that two nucleophiles react with the same relative reactivity regardless of the nature of the electrophile, which is in violation of the reactivity–selectivity principle. For this reason, this equation is also called the constant selectivity relationship.

In the original publication the data were obtained by reactions of selected nucleophiles with selected electrophilic carbocations such as tropylium or diazonium cations:

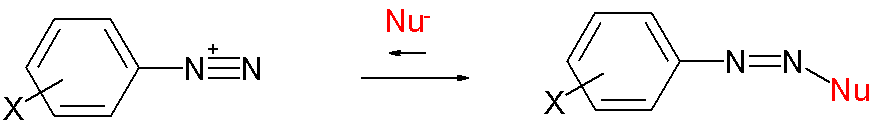

or (not displayed) ions based on malachite green. Many other reaction types have since been described.

Typical Ritchie N^{+} values (in methanol) are: 0.5 for methanol, 5.9 for the cyanide anion, 7.5 for the methoxide anion, 8.5 for the azide anion, and 10.7 for the thiophenol anion. The values for the relative cation reactivities are −0.4 for the malachite green cation, +2.6 for the benzenediazonium cation, and +4.5 for the tropylium cation.

==== Mayr–Patz equation ====
In the Mayr–Patz equation (1994):

$$\log(k) = s(N + E)$$

The second order reaction rate constant k at 20 °C for a reaction is related to a nucleophilicity parameter N, an electrophilicity parameter E, and a nucleophile-dependent slope parameter s. The constant s is defined as 1 with 2-methyl-1-pentene as the nucleophile.

Many of the constants have been derived from reaction of so-called benzhydrylium ions as the electrophiles:

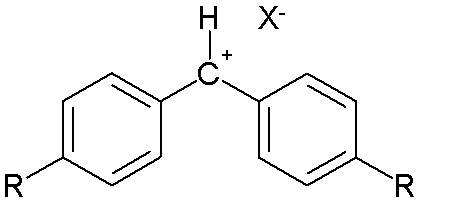

and a diverse collection of π-nucleophiles:

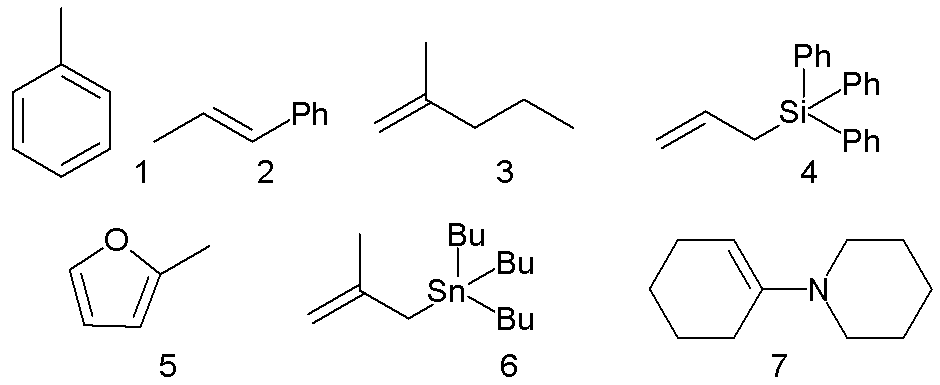
.

Typical E values are +6.2 for R = chlorine, +5.90 for R = hydrogen, 0 for R = methoxy and −7.02 for R = dimethylamine.

Typical N values with s in parentheses are −4.47 (1.32) for electrophilic aromatic substitution to toluene (1), −0.41 (1.12) for electrophilic addition to 1-phenyl-2-propene (2), and 0.96 (1) for addition to 2-methyl-1-pentene (3), −0.13 (1.21) for reaction with triphenylallylsilane (4), 3.61 (1.11) for reaction with 2-methylfuran (5), +7.48 (0.89) for reaction with isobutenyltributylstannane (6) and +13.36 (0.81) for reaction with the enamine 7.

The range of organic reactions also include SN2 reactions:

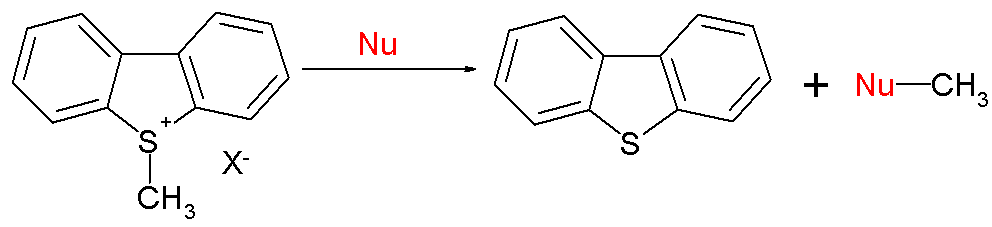

With E = −9.15 for the S-methyldibenzothiophenium ion, typical nucleophile values N (s) are 15.63 (0.64) for piperidine, 10.49 (0.68) for methoxide, and 5.20 (0.89) for water. In short, nucleophilicities towards sp_{2} or sp_{3} centers follow the same pattern.

==== Unified equation ====
In an effort to unify the above described equations the Mayr equation is rewritten as:

$\log(k) = s_Es_N(N + E)$

with s_{E} the electrophile-dependent slope parameter and s_{N} the nucleophile-dependent slope parameter. This equation can be rewritten in several ways:

- with s_{E} = 1 for carbocations this equation is equal to the original Mayr–Patz equation of 1994,
- with s_{N} = 0.6 for most n nucleophiles the equation becomes

$$\log(k) = 0.6s_EN + 0.6s_EE$$

or the original Scott–Swain equation written as:

$$\log(k) = \log(k_0) + s_EN$$

- with s_{E} = 1 for carbocations and s_{N} = 0.6 the equation becomes:

$$\log(k) = 0.6N + 0.6E$$

or the original Ritchie equation written as:

$$\log(k) - \log(k_0) = N^+$$

== Types ==
Examples of nucleophiles are anions such as Cl^{−}, or a compound with a lone pair of electrons such as NH_{3} (ammonia) and PR_{3}.

In the example below, the oxygen of the hydroxide ion donates an electron pair to form a new chemical bond with the carbon at the end of the bromopropane molecule. The bond between the carbon and the bromine then undergoes heterolytic fission, with the bromine atom taking the donated electron and becoming the bromide ion (Br^{−}), because a S_{N}2 reaction occurs by backside attack. This means that the hydroxide ion attacks the carbon atom from the other side, exactly opposite the bromine ion. Because of this backside attack, S_{N}2 reactions result in an inversion of the configuration of the electrophile. If the electrophile is chiral, it typically maintains its chirality, though the S_{N}2 product's absolute configuration is flipped as compared to that of the original electrophile.

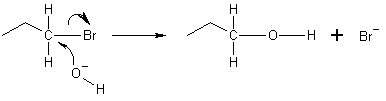

=== Ambident nucleophile ===
An ambident nucleophile is one that can attack from two or more places, resulting in two or more products. For example, the thiocyanate ion (SCN^{−}) may attack from either the sulfur or the nitrogen. For this reason, the S_{N}2 reaction of an alkyl halide with SCN^{−} often leads to a mixture of an alkyl thiocyanate (R-SCN) and an alkyl isothiocyanate (R-NCS). Similar considerations apply in the Kolbe nitrile synthesis.

=== Halogens ===
While the halogens are not nucleophilic in their diatomic form (e.g. I_{2} is not a nucleophile), their anions are good nucleophiles. In polar, protic solvents, F^{−} is the weakest nucleophile, and I^{−} the strongest; this order is reversed in polar, aprotic solvents.

=== Carbon ===
Carbon nucleophiles are often organometallic reagents such as those found in the Grignard reaction, Blaise reaction, Reformatsky reaction, and Barbier reaction or reactions involving organolithium reagents and acetylides. These reagents are often used to perform nucleophilic additions.

Enols are also carbon nucleophiles. The formation of an enol is catalyzed by acid or base. Enols are ambident nucleophiles, but, in general, nucleophilic at the alpha carbon atom. Enols are commonly used in condensation reactions, including the Claisen condensation and the aldol condensation reactions.

=== Oxygen ===
Examples of oxygen nucleophiles are water (H_{2}O), hydroxide anion, alcohols, alkoxide anions, hydrogen peroxide, and carboxylate anions. Nucleophilic attack does not take place during intermolecular hydrogen bonding.

=== Sulfur ===
Of sulfur nucleophiles, hydrogen sulfide and its salts, thiols (RSH), thiolate anions (RS^{−}), anions of thiolcarboxylic acids (RC(O)-S^{−}), and anions of dithiocarbonates (RO-C(S)-S^{−}) and dithiocarbamates (R_{2}N-C(S)-S^{−}) are used most often.

In general, sulfur is very nucleophilic because of its large size, which makes it readily polarizable, and its lone pairs of electrons are readily accessible.

=== Nitrogen ===
Nitrogen nucleophiles include ammonia, azide, amines, nitrites, hydroxylamine, hydrazine, carbazide, phenylhydrazine, semicarbazide, and amide.

=== Metal centers ===
Although metal centers (e.g., Li^{+}, Zn^{2+}, Sc^{3+}, etc.) are most commonly cationic and electrophilic (Lewis acidic) in nature, certain metal centers (particularly ones in a low oxidation state and/or carrying a negative charge) are among the strongest recorded nucleophiles and are sometimes referred to as "supernucleophiles." For instance, using methyl iodide as the reference electrophile, Ph_{3}Sn^{–} is about 10000 times more nucleophilic than I^{–}, while the Co(I) form of vitamin B_{12} (vitamin B_{12s}) is about 10^{7} times more nucleophilic. Other supernucleophilic metal centers include low oxidation state carbonyl metalate anions (e.g., CpFe(CO)_{2}^{–}).

== Examples ==
The following table shows the nucleophilicity of some molecules with methanol as the solvent:

Relative nucleophilicity	Molecules
Very Good	I⁻, HS⁻, RS⁻
Good	Br⁻, OH⁻, RO⁻, CN⁻, N_{3}⁻
Fair	NH_{3}, Cl⁻, F⁻, RCO_{2}⁻
Weak	H_{2}O, ROH
Very Weak	RCO_{2}H

== See also ==
- Electrophile – Chemical species that accepts an electron pair from a nucleophile
- Lewis acids and bases – Chemical bond theory
- Nucleophilic abstraction – Type of organometallic reaction
- Addition to pi ligands – Organometallic chemistry rule
