= Semicarbazone =

Class of chemical compounds

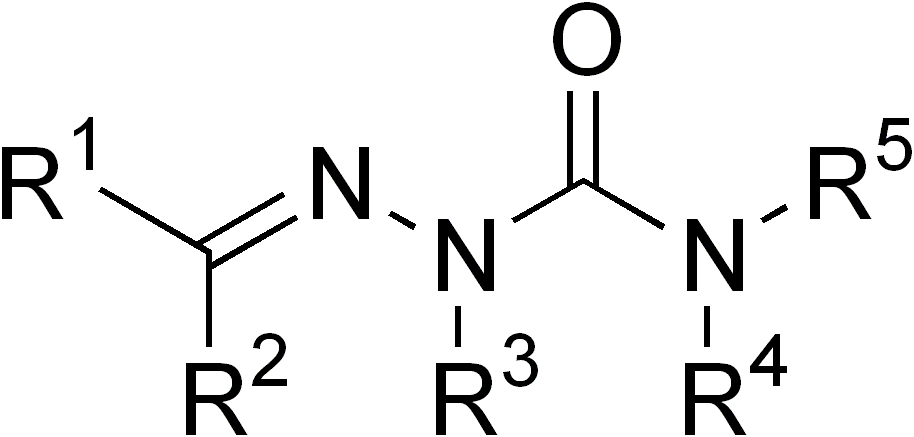
General chemical structure of a semicarbazone

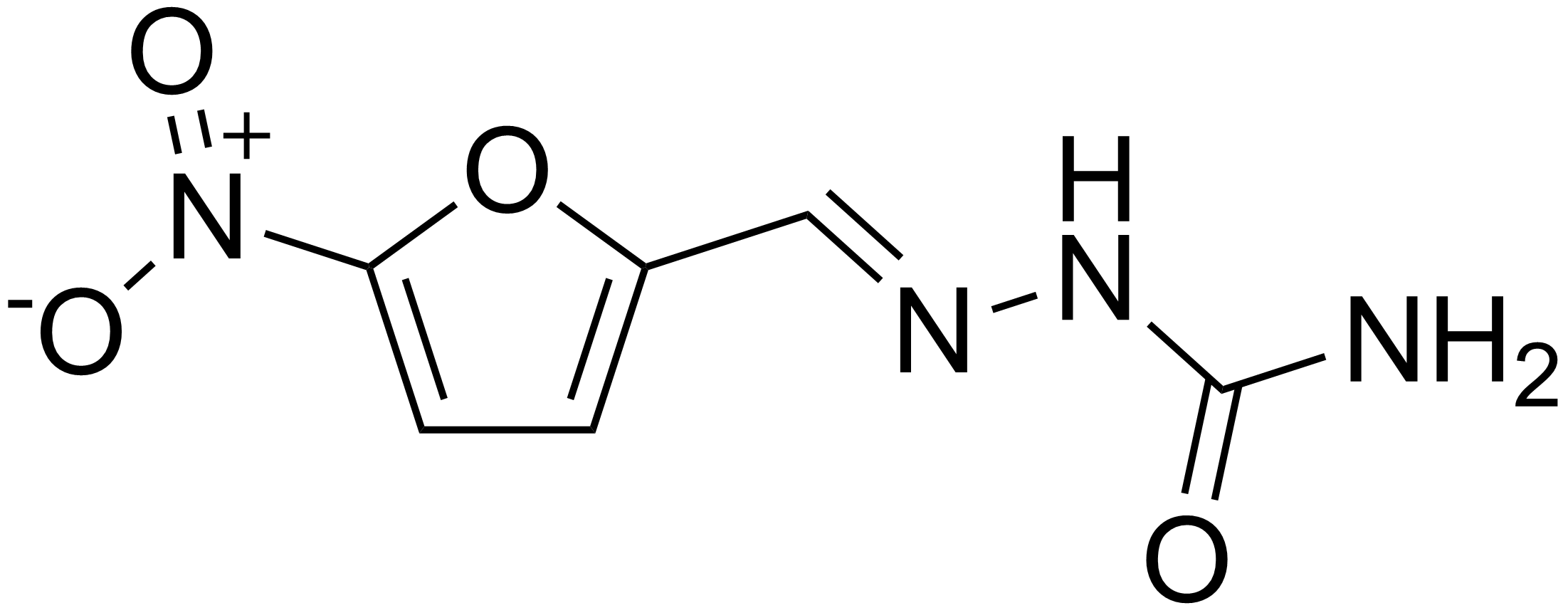
Nitrofurazone is a semicarbazone used as an antiseptic

In organic chemistry, a semicarbazone is a derivative of imines formed by a condensation reaction between a ketone or aldehyde and semicarbazide. They are classified as imine derivatives because they are formed from the reaction of an aldehyde or ketone with the terminal -NH_{2} group of semicarbazide, which behaves very similarly to primary amines.

== Formation ==
For ketones
H_{2}NNHC(=O)NH_{2} + RC(=O)R → R_{2}C=NNHC(=O)NH_{2}

For aldehydes
H_{2}NNHC(=O)NH_{2} + RCHO → RCH=NNHC(=O)NH_{2}

For example, the semicarbazone of acetone would have the structure (CH_{3})_{2}C=NNHC(=O)NH_{2}.

== Properties and uses ==
Some semicarbazones, such as nitrofurazone, and thiosemicarbazones are known to have anti-viral and anti-cancer activity, usually mediated through binding to copper or iron in cells. Many semicarbazones are crystalline solids, useful for the identification of the parent aldehydes/ketones by melting point analysis.

A thiosemicarbazone is an analog of a semicarbazone which contains a sulfur atom in place of the oxygen atom.

== See also ==
- Carbazone
- Carbazide
- Thiosemicarbazone
