= Semicarbazide =

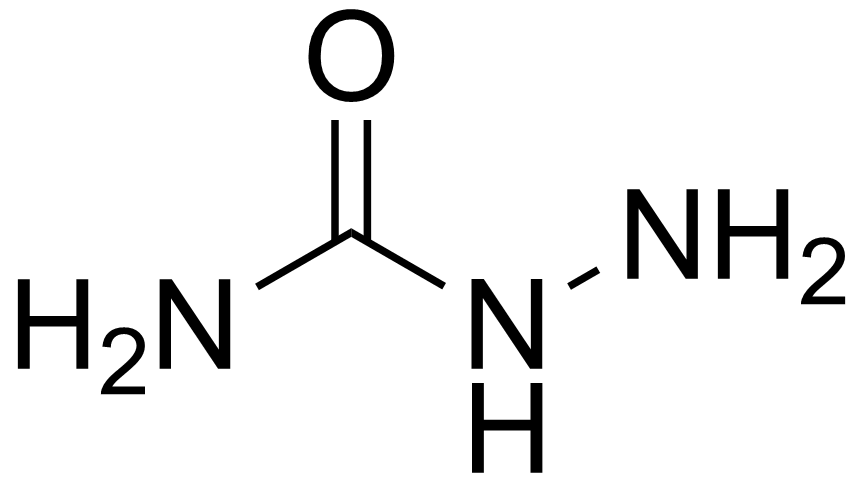

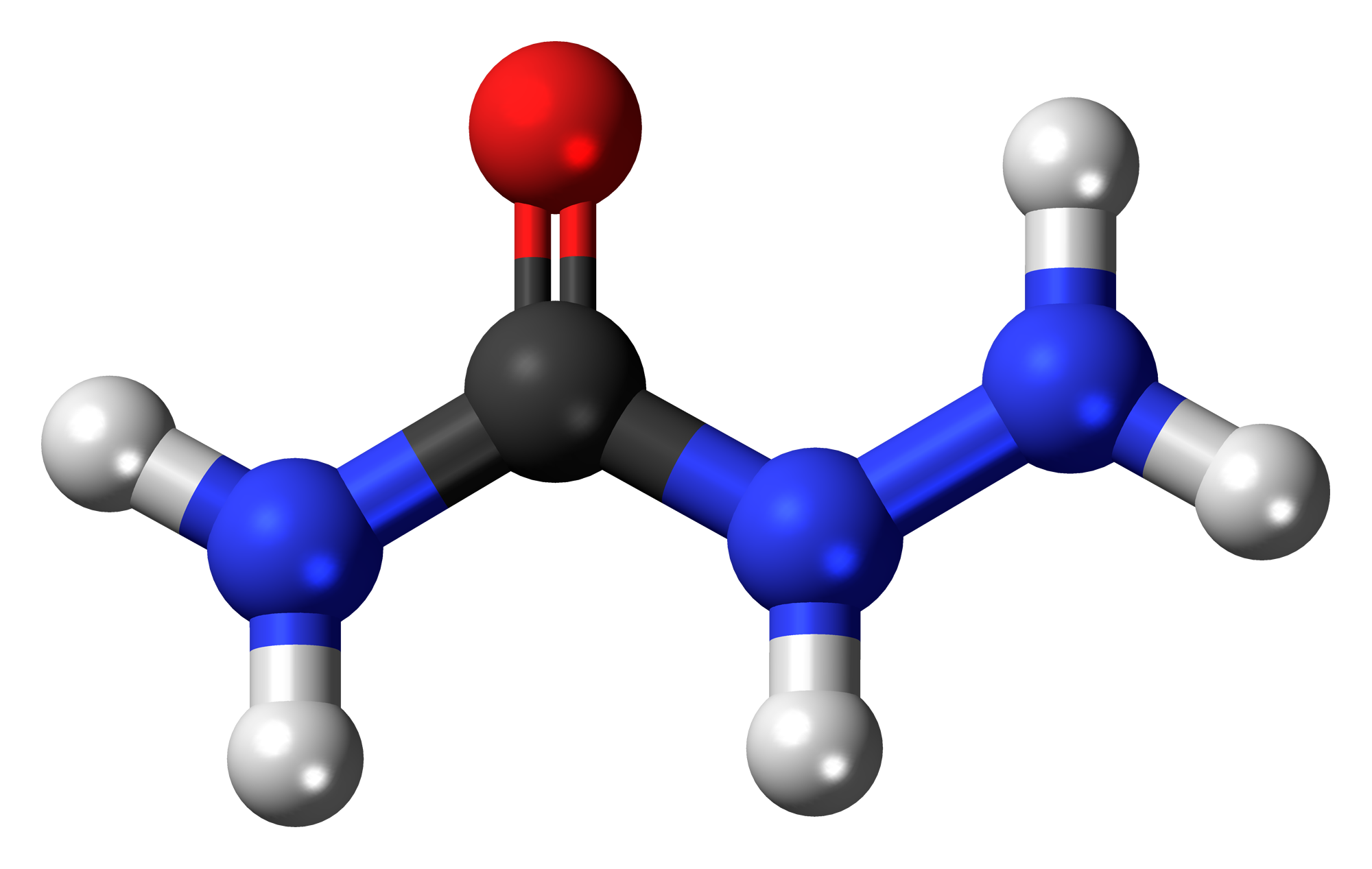

Names
- IUPAC name Hydrazinecarboxamide
- Other names: Semicarbazide; Aminourea

Identifiers
CAS Number	57-56-7
3D model (JSmol)	Interactive image
ChEBI	CHEBI:28306
ChEMBL	ChEMBL903
ChemSpider	5008
ECHA InfoCard	100.000.308
KEGG	C02077
PubChem CID	5196
UNII	37QUC23K2X
CompTox Dashboard (EPA)	DTXSID7043823
- InChI: InChI=1S/CH5N3O/c2-1(5)4-3/h3H2,(H3,2,4,5) Key: DUIOPKIIICUYRZ-UHFFFAOYSA-N; InChI=1/CH5N3O/c2-1(5)4-3/h3H2,(H3,2,4,5) Key: DUIOPKIIICUYRZ-UHFFFAOYAJ
- SMILES: C(=O)(N)NN

Properties
Chemical formula	CH_{5}N_{3}O
Molar mass	75.071 g·mol^{−1}
Melting point	96 °C (205 °F; 369 K)

Hazards
- GHS labelling
Pictograms	(GHS06: Toxic) (GHS07: Exclamation mark)
Signal word	Danger
Hazard statements	H301, H315, H319, H335
Precautionary statements	P261, P264, P270, P271, P280, P301+P310, P302+P352, P304+P340, P305+P351+P338, P312, P330, P332+P313, P337+P313, P362, P403+P233, P405
NFPA 704 (fire diamond)	2 0 0
- Safety data sheet (SDS)
- Except where otherwise noted, data are given for materials in their standard state (at 25 °C [77 °F], 100 kPa). verify (what is ?) Infobox references

Semicarbazide is the chemical compound with the formula OC(NH_{2})(N_{2}H_{3}). It is a water-soluble white solid. It is a derivative of urea.

== Synthesis ==
The compound prepared by treating urea with hydrazine:

OC(NH_{2})_{2} + N_{2}H_{4} → OC(NH_{2})(N_{2}H_{3}) + NH_{3}

A further reaction can occur to give carbohydrazide:

OC(NH_{2})(N_{2}H_{3}) + N_{2}H_{4} → OC(N_{2}H_{3})_{2} + NH_{3}

== Derivatives ==
Semicarbazide is frequently reacted with aldehydes and ketones to produce semicarbazones via a condensation reaction. This is an example of imine formation resulting from the reaction of a primary amine with a carbonyl group. The reaction is useful because semicarbazones, like oximes and 2,4-DNPs, typically have high melting points and crystallize, facilitating purification or identification of reaction products.

== Properties ==
Semicarbazide products (semicarbazones and thiosemicarbazones) are known to have an activity of antiviral, antiinfective and antineoplastic through binding to copper or iron in cells.

== Uses, occurrence, detection ==
Semicarbazide is used in preparing pharmaceuticals including nitrofuran antibacterials (furazolidone, nitrofurazone, nitrofurantoin) and related compounds. It is also a product of degradations of the blowing agent azodicarbonamide (ADC). Semicarbazide forms in heat-treated flour containing ADC as well as breads made from ADC-treated flour.

Semicarbazide is used as a detection reagent in thin layer chromatography (TLC). Semicarbazide stains α-keto acids on the TLC plate, which can then be viewed under ultraviolet light.

== See also ==
- Biurea - another product of reaction of urea with hydrazine
- Carbazide - structurally related with the general formula (R_{2}NNH)_{2}C(O)
- Semicarbazide-cadmium therapy
- thiosemicarbazide
