= Mycobacterium mageritense =

Scientific classification
- Domain: Bacteria
- Kingdom: Bacillati
- Phylum: Actinomycetota
- Class: Actinomycetes
- Order: Mycobacteriales
- Family: Mycobacteriaceae
- Genus: Mycobacterium
- Species: M. mageritense

Binomial name
- Mycobacterium mageritense Domenech et al. 1997, ATCC 700351

Species of bacterium

Mycobacterium mageritense is a species of rapidly growing microorganism in the genus Mycobacterium. This species causes Lymphadentis in children. In adults, M. mageritense causes pneumonia.

== Etymology ==
Magerit, is Arabic for Madrid, where it was first isolated from human sputum.

== Description ==
This species is a gram-positive, nonmotile and strongly acid-fast rods.

=== Colony characteristics ===
Their colonies are smooth, mucoid and nonphotochromogenic.

=== Physiology ===
Members of this species have rapid growth on Löwenstein-Jensen medium at 22 °C, 30 °C, 37 °C and 45 °C within 2–4 days. Their optimum growth at 30 °C and 37 °C. M. mageritense is resistant to isoniazid, cycloserine, capreomycin, pyrazinamide, and thiosemicarbazone. Most strains are also resistant to ethambutol.

=== Differential characteristics ===
This species can be characterized by unique hsp65 gene, 16S rDNA and sodA sequences. They are closely related to M. fortuitum and M. peregrinum at the DNA homology level. They can also be differentiation from M. fortuitum by its growth at 45 °C and by its use of mannitol as a sole carbon source.

== Pathogenesis ==
It has a Biosafety level 1.

== Type strain ==
Strain 938 = ATCC 700351 = CCUG 37984 = CIP 104973 = DSM 44476 = JCM 12375.
