= Semicarbazide-cadmium therapy =

Experimental cancer treatment

Semicarbazide-cadmium therapy — also known as the Kachugin method — was an experimental cancer therapy that was tested in several clinical trials in the Soviet Union during the 1960s. It was devised by Russian physician and chemist Anatoly Trofimovich Kachugin (1895-1971). Semicarbazide is an irreversible inhibitor of semicarbazide-sensitive amine oxidase (SSAO), an enzyme possibly involved in exacerbation of inflammation. Cadmium is a heavy metal and can also induce apoptosis.

The first study in humans was an open pilot trial conducted in Russia in 1957—1962. It was also patented in Russia. This method was successfully used for treatment of patients in later stages of lung, intestinal, and breast cancer, melanoma, and some other cancer types. The experiments were accompanied by organizational problems (conflict between soviet authorities and scientists).

== Method ==
The method involved the use of the following preparations: semicarbazide hydrochloride, urea, and cadmium halides. Additionally, stable isotopes of gadolinium, as gadolinium oxides, can be used, in addition to other drugs.

=== Semicarbazide ===
Clinical use of semicarbazide (a SSAO-inhibitor) gives the evidence that an inflammatory reaction can be reduced by blocking the enzymatic activity of the enzyme semicarbazide-sensitive amine oxidase (SSAO). SSAO activity was found significantly increased in blood and tissues in some pathological conditions. The enzyme activity has been reported to be elevated in diabetes and cancer. The mean specific activity of SSAO was significantly elevated in the group of patients having prostate cancer with skeletal metastases. Semicarbazide (and SSAO blockers) can reduce inflammatory response and can protect against the progressive vascular complications caused by oxidative stress. It also can reduce pain. The SSAO inhibitors also appears able to protect endothelial cells against toxic effects of free radicals. Semicarbazide itself is a standard enzyme inhibitor and new SSAO inhibitors are in development. SSAO inhibitors significantly blocked the catalytic activity of VAP-1 in tumor, attenuated tumor progression, and reduced neo-angiogenesis. Semicarbazide is a known inhibitor of glutamic acid decarboxylase (GAD), the enzyme responsible for GABA synthesis. GABA has emerged as a tumor signaling molecule in the periphery that controls the proliferation of tumor cells and perhaps tumor stem cells.

=== Cadmium ===
Cadmium is a heavy metal and an environmental pollutant. Cadmium is a known carcinogen. Cadmium exposure has been linked to lung, prostate and renal cancer. It is not a strong mutagen, but acts as a promoter through mitogenic effects on gene expression. Cadmium (metallotherapeutic drug, metal-based drug) can induce apoptosis (programmed tumor cell death) in various cell types. It can also be anti-carcinogenic under certain conditions. At low concentrations, cadmium is able to stimulate the immune system, while at higher concentrations inhibitory and suppressive reactions were observed. Cadmium may inhibit angiogenesis. As a stress agent, inducing apoptosis and blocking it, Cd can have both helpful and harmful effects.

== See also ==
- Hydrazine sulfate
