= Jacoba G. Kapsenberg =

Dutch virologist

- Father: G. Kapsenberg
- Scientific career
- Fields: Virology
- Institutions: National Laboratory of Public Health, Utrecht
- Thesis: Cultivation of vaccinia-virus in tissue explants
- Doctoral advisor: H.S. Frenkel

Jacoba G. Kapsenberg (Groningen, 27 August 1924 - De Bilt, 12 March 2024) was a Dutch virologist who worked at the National Laboratory of Public Health, Utrecht, the Netherlands, from 1954 until 1989. There, she was responsible for viral diagnostics and developing the laboratory to the level of a national reference laboratory.

== Career ==
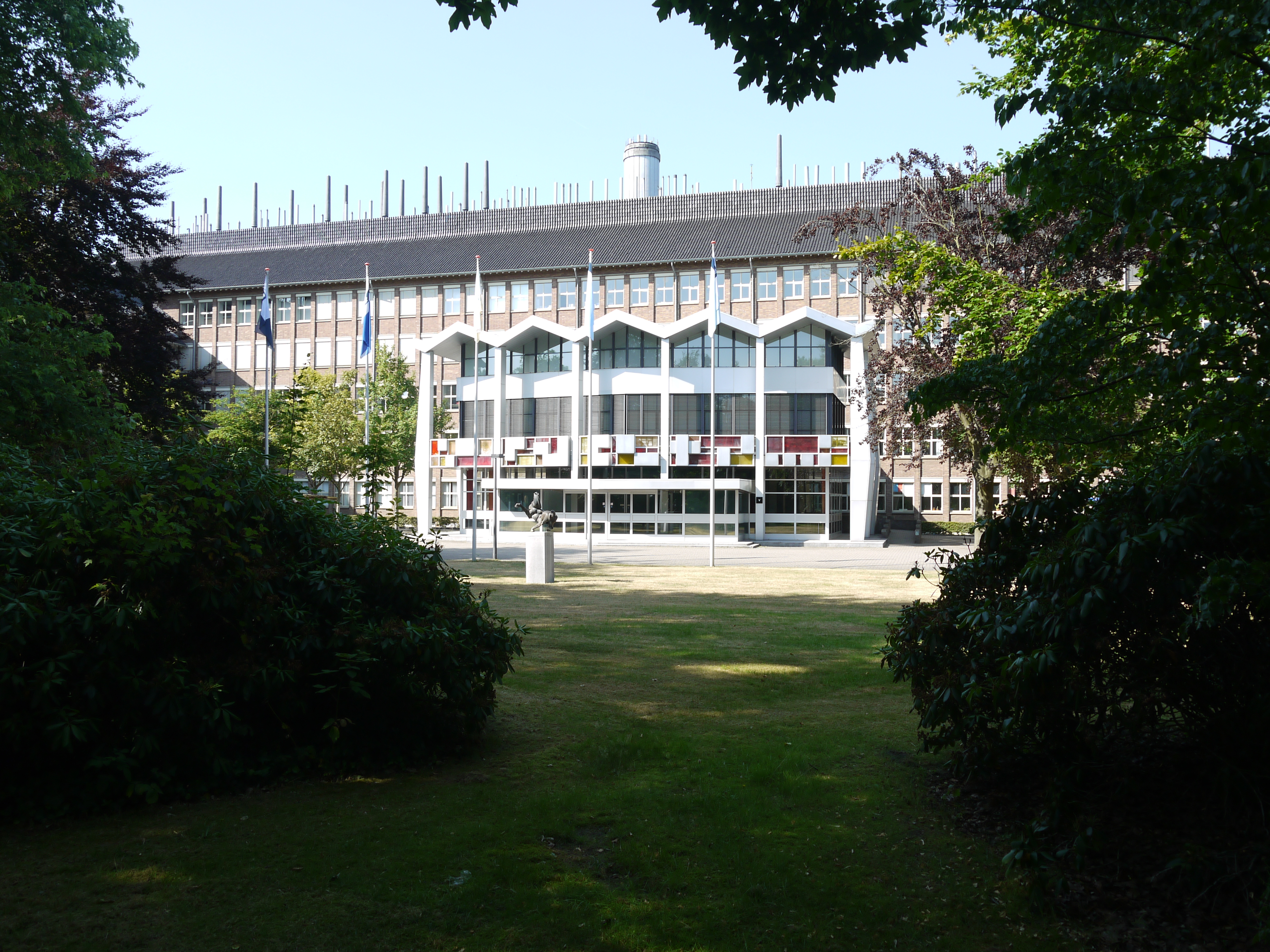
National Institute for Public Health and the Environment

In 1954, as a student of H.S. Frenkel, Kapsenberg published a new method to obtain a vaccine against smallpox virus in explanted fetal cow and sheep skin tissue in a liquid medium. The following year she completed her thesis, "Cultivation of vaccinia-virus in tissue explants", from the University of Amsterdam. She joined the Laboratory for Virology in 1956 and over subsequent years, developed it to the level of a national reference laboratory.

She identified some of the early cases of monkeypox in captive monkeys in the mid 1960s. In 1966, with Rijk Gispen, she detected monkeypox in healthy laboratory monkeys, but later revealed this was probably a result of contamination from monkeypox virus isolated in the same laboratory that tested samples from cases at an outbreak at Rotterdam Zoo. Between 1970 and 1986 rates of fatalities from monkeypox in Zaire, were worrying, but studies at the time observed that the virus was not easily transmissible between people, and Kapsenberg's studies concluded that the monkeypox virus could not spontaneously mutate into smallpox.

She was part of the group that first identified Human adenovirus 41 in children with diarrhoea in 1983.

== Personal and family ==
Kapsenberg was affectionately known as Cootje. Her father was G. Kapsenberg from Groningen.

== Selected publications ==
- Kapsenberg, J. G. (1 August 1959). "Relationship of Infectious Canine Hepatitis Virus to Human Adenovirus". Experimental Biology and Medicine. 101 (4): 611–614. doi:10.3181/00379727-101-25035. ISSN 1535-3702. PMID 14404448. S2CID 1720006.
- Kapsenberg, Jacoba G. (1 March 1968). "ECHO virus type 33 as a cause of meningitis". Archiv für die gesamte Virusforschung. 23 (1): 144–147. doi:10.1007/BF01242122. ISSN 1432-8798. PMID 4971364. S2CID 21946814.
- De Jong, J. C.; Kapsenberg, Jacoba G.; Muzerie, C. J.; Wermenbol, A. G.; Kidd, A. H.; Wadell, G.; Firtzlaff, R.-G.; Wigand, R. (1983). "Candidate adenoviruses 40 and 41: Fastidious adenoviruses from human infant stool". Journal of Medical Virology. 11 (3): 215–231. doi:10.1002/jmv.1890110305. PMID 6306161. S2CID 31148587.
- Kapsenberg, Jacoba G. (1988). "Picornaviridae: The Enteroviruses (Polioviruses, Coxsackieviruses, Echoviruses)". Laboratory Diagnosis of Infectious Diseases Principles and Practice: VOLUME II Viral, Rickettsial, and Chlamydial Diseases. Springer. pp. 692–722. doi:10.1007/978-1-4612-3900-0_36. ISBN 978-1-4612-3900-0.

== Bibliography ==
- Doornum, Gerard van; Sankaran, Neeraja; Helvoort, T. van (2020). Leeuwenhoek's legatees and Beijerinck's beneficiaries: a history of medical virology in the Netherlands. Amsterdam: Amsterdam University Press. ISBN 978-90-485-4406-6. JSTOR j.ctvwh8bpb.
