= 4-Methyl-3-thiosemicarbazide =

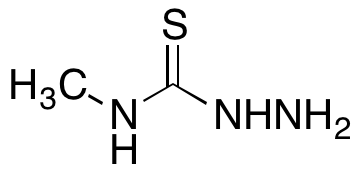

Names
- Preferred IUPAC name N-Methylhydrazinecarbothioamide

Identifiers
CAS Number	6610-29-3
3D model (JSmol)	Interactive image
ChEMBL	ChEMBL3182946
ChemSpider	2006040
ECHA InfoCard	100.026.876
EC Number	229-563-2
PubChem CID	2723853
UNII	PK83E1T776
CompTox Dashboard (EPA)	DTXSID7044390
- InChI: InChI=1S/C2H7N3S/c1-4-2(6)5-3/h3H2,1H3,(H2,4,5,6) Key: PTVZQOAHCSKAAS-UHFFFAOYSA-N; InChI=1S/C2H7N3S/c1-4-2(6)5-3/h3H2,1H3,(H2,4,5,6) Key: OKISUZLXOYGIFP-UHFFFAOYAC
- SMILES: CNC(=S)NN

Properties
Chemical formula	C_{2}H_{7}N_{3}S
Molar mass	105.16 g·mol^{−1}
Melting point	135 to 138 °C (275 to 280 °F; 408 to 411 K)

Hazards
- GHS labelling
Pictograms	(GHS06: Toxic)
Signal word	Danger
Hazard statements	H300
Precautionary statements	P264, P270, P301+P310, P321, P330, P405, P501
- Lethal dose or concentration (LD, LC)
LD_{50} (median dose)	14 mg/kg rat
- Except where otherwise noted, data are given for materials in their standard state (at 25 °C [77 °F], 100 kPa). verify (what is ?) Infobox references

4-Methyl-3-thiosemicarbazide is an organosulfur compound with the formula of CH_{3}NHC(S)NHNH_{2}. It is a white, odorless solid. The compound is one of the many derivatives of thiosemicarbazide. It is a precursor to diverse organic compounds and metal complexes.

== Applications ==
4-Methyl-3-thiosemicarbazide is used as an intermediate compound in the synthesis of some types of herbicides, for example tebuthiuron.

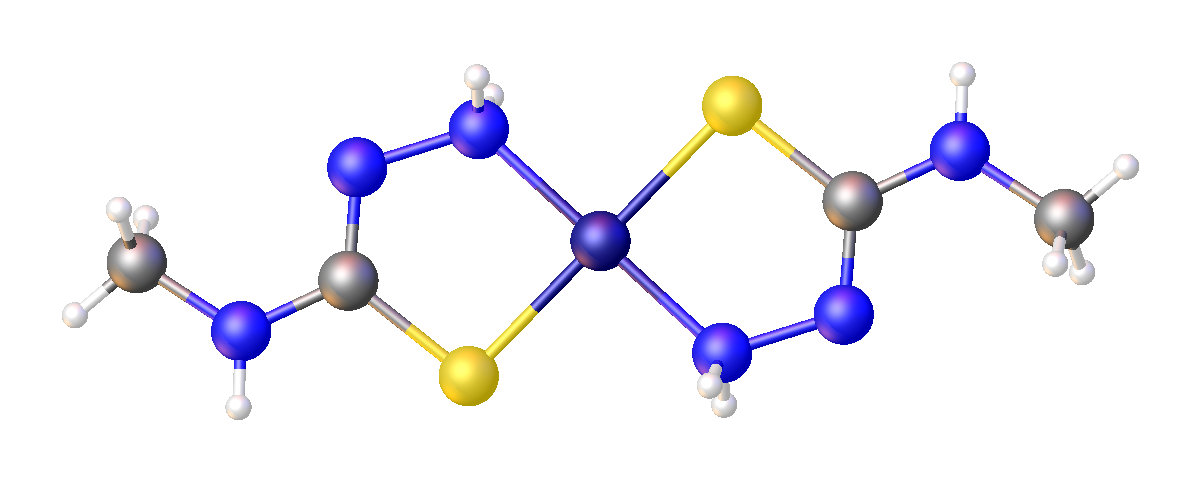
Structure of Ni(H_{2}NNCSNHMe)_{2}.

== Precautions and toxicity ==
4-Methyl-3-thiosemicarbazide can cause irritation of the eyes, respiratory tract, and skin. Swallowing the chemical may cause death. It is classified as a "dangerous good for transport".
