= 2023–2026 mpox epidemic =

Global disease outbreak since September 2023

- Countries with 10,000+ cases Countries with 1,000–9,999 cases Countries with 100–999 cases Countries with 1–99 cases No confirmed clade Ib cases
- Disease: Mpox (clade Ib)
- Location: Primarily Central Africa, limited local transmission elsewhere
- Date: First detected September 2023 Declared public health emergency of international concern: 14 August 2024-5 September 2025
- Confirmed cases: 54,116 since 1 Jan 2024
- Deaths: 492 since 1 Jan 2022

An epidemic of a new variant of clade I mpox (formerly known as monkeypox), called clade 1b, began in Central Africa at least as early as September 2023. As of September 2024, more than 29,000 cases have been reported, with over 800 fatalities (~3% fatality rate), nearly all in the Democratic Republic of the Congo. According to the European CDC: "The size of these outbreaks could be larger than reported due to under-ascertainment and under-reporting."

On 14 August 2024, the World Health Organization declared the epidemic a public health emergency of international concern.

== Background ==
Mpox is an infectious viral disease that is endemic among small mammals in central areas of Africa; it can also infect humans. Symptoms include a rash that forms blisters and then crusts over, fever, and swollen lymph nodes. The illness is usually mild, and most infected individuals recover within a few weeks without treatment. However, cases may be severe, especially in children, pregnant women, or people with suppressed immune systems.

In May 2022, the World Health Organization (WHO) declared a prior mpox outbreak, involving a clade IIb of the virus, a global health emergency. The disease had infected 87,000 individuals and caused 140 deaths when the WHO ended its global emergency in May 2023, citing a combination of vaccination and public health information as successful control measures. Cases of clade IIb which can be traced to this outbreak are continuing to be detected worldwide, although at a relatively low level.

In September 2023, cases of mpox started increasing in the Democratic Republic of the Congo and continued into 2024. The Africa Centres for Disease Control and Prevention (ACDC) reported a 160% increase in cases from the previous year. Most of these cases were determined to be caused by clade I of the virus.

== Outbreak ==
=== Reported cases and casualties ===
As of 22/26 March 2026

Reported cases in countries that have positively identified clade Ib
	Location	Cases (Lab-confirmed)	Deaths (Lab-confirmed)	First confirmed clade Ib case	Last confirmed clade Ib case
(Democratic Republic of the Congo)	DR Congo	37,280	78	September 2023	
(Burundi)	Burundi	4,682	1	July 2024	
(Kenya)	Kenya	1,087	19	July 2024	
(United Kingdom)	United Kingdom	110	0	30 October 2024	
(Rwanda)	Rwanda	131	0	July 2024	
(Uganda)	Uganda	8,512	52	July 2024	
(Sweden)	Sweden	1	0	15 August 2024	
(Thailand)	Thailand	15	0	22 August 2024	
(India)	India	18	0	24 September 2024	
(Germany)	Germany	16	0	18 October 2024	
(Zimbabwe)	Zimbabwe	1	0	18 October 2024	
(Angola)	Angola	2	0	15 November 2024	
(United States)	United States	21	0	16 November 2024	
(Canada)	Canada	4	0	22 November 2024	
(Pakistan)	Pakistan	1	0	2 December 2024	
(Oman)	Oman	1	0	10 December 2024	
(Belgium)	Belgium	10	0	19 December 2024	
(Zambia)	Zambia	398	3	30 December 2024	
(China)	China	29	0	3 January 2025	
(France)	France	10	0	7 January 2025	
(United Arab Emirates)	United Arab Emirates	2	0	7 February 2025	
(Tanzania)	Tanzania	304	1	10 March 2025	
(Malawi)	Malawi	159	1	2025	
(Madagascar)	Madagascar	788	2	December 2025	
(Central African Republic)	Central African Republic	171	8		
(Republic of the Congo)	Republic of Congo	164	1		
(Mozambique)	Mozambique	93	0		
(Spain)	Spain	87			
(South Sudan)	South Sudan	50	2		
(Ethiopia)	Ethiopia	48	1		
(United Nations)	Other countries	112			
Total		54,116	169+		

Reported cases since September 2023 in countries with only clade II or clade Ia
	Location	Cases ( (Note: Number of cases confirmed.))	Deaths ( (Note: Number of deaths confirmed.))	Status
(United States)	United States	4,259	11–25	Clade IIb
(Nigeria)	Nigeria	1,484 (167)	0	Clade IIa
(Australia)	Australia	1,680	0	Clade IIb
(Philippines)	Philippines	911+	0	Clade unspecified (December 2023), Clade II (2024)
(Central African Republic)	Central African Republic	263 (85)	1–10	Clade Ia
(United Kingdom)	United Kingdom	271	0	Clade unspecified
(Canada)	Canada	365	0	Clade IIb
(Republic of the Congo)	Republic of the Congo	158 (23)	1	Clade Ia
(Germany)	Germany	240	1	Clade unspecified
(Cameroon)	Cameroon	35 (5)	2	Clade IIa and clade Ia
(Ivory Coast)	Ivory Coast	28	1	Clade IIa
(South Africa)	South Africa	24	3	Clade IIa
(Indonesia)	Indonesia	14	0	Clade II
(Hong Kong)	Hong Kong	14	0	Clade IIb
(Singapore)	Singapore	13	0	Clade II
(Argentina)	Argentina	10+	0	Clade IIb
(Republic of Ireland)	Ireland	47	0	Clade I and Clade IIb
(Liberia)	Liberia	63	0	Clade IIa
(Ghana)	Ghana	4	0	Clade II
(Pakistan)	Pakistan	4	0	Clade II
(Taiwan)	Taiwan	4	0	Clade unspecified
(Portugal)	Portugal	65	0	Clade IIb
(Malawi)	Malawi	2	0	Clade unspecified
(Mozambique)	Mozambique	1	0	Clade unspecified
(Gabon)	Gabon	2	0	Clade unspecified
(Chile)	Chile	26	0	Clade unspecified
(Morocco)	Morocco	3	0	Clade unspecified
(Guinea)	Guinea	1	0	Clade unspecified

=== Timeline ===
Mpox cases from clade Ib infections were growing in the Democratic Republic of the Congo (DRC) by September 2023, with several of them being identified in Kamituga, a mining town in the province of South Kivu. A nationwide outbreak was reported in January 2024.

On 12 August 2024, the Africa Centres for Disease Control and Prevention declared that the growing mpox outbreaks in Africa had become a public health emergency, with over 517 deaths being reported. As a result, the organization requested the help and intervention of the international community to control the spread of the virus and treat infected patients. The ACDC stated that the fatality rate of the strain of virus causing the outbreak was 3–4%, significantly higher than the less than 1% fatality rate recorded during the 2022–2023 mpox outbreak. On 14 August, the World Health Organization declared the epidemic a public health emergency of international concern or global health emergency.

As of 16 August 2024, fifteen countries were reported to have identified cases of mpox; and over 96% of all reported cases and fatalities from the disease were confirmed in the DRC, with 16,839 reported cases and 501 reported deaths. The ACDC reported that 70% of reported cases in the DRC were in children under 15, as that demographic represented 85% of reported deaths. Epidemiologist Jacques Alonda expressed concern over the disease's spread in refugee camps in the DRC and its neighbor countries, mainly due to the amount of pressure already applied to the national healthcare system by concurrent outbreaks of cholera and measles, as well as widespread malnutrition.

Also on 16 August, the European Centre for Disease Prevention and Control (ECDC) officially raised the risk level of clade I to the general European population from "very low" to "low" due to the likelihood of more imported cases being identified across the continent, although the agency reiterated that the risk of sustained transmission of the virus strain in Europe was still considered to be minimum. The ECDC also advised travellers to consider getting vaccinated against mpox should they visit African countries affected by the outbreak.

As of 19 September 2024, 15 of the 55 member states of the African Union have reported cases according the Africa CDC. Rwanda started its vaccination campaign, while the Democratic Republic of Congo, the epicentre of the outbreak, is set to start vaccinations in early October 2024.

In October 2024, the WHO approved the first diagnostic test under the Emergency Use Listing (EUL) procedure. The Alinity m MPXV assay enables the detection of the virus by testing swabs of skin lesions.

=== Countries with widespread transmission ===
==== Democratic Republic of the Congo ====
As of August 2024, a cumulative total of 16,839 suspected cases of mpox (at least 1,888 of which were laboratory confirmed) and 570 deaths (at least 8 of which were laboratory confirmed) have been reported in the Democratic Republic of the Congo (DRC).

On 19 August, the DRC's Ministry of Public Health, Samuel Roger Kamba Mulamba, said in a press conference that all of the country's provinces, including the capital city of Kinshasa, had been affected by the outbreak, while announcing that the national government would launch a €45 million response plan including awareness campaigns, medical team deployment and patient care, but not vaccines.

Various media reported that the impact of the mpox outbreak across the DRC, and especially in eastern provinces, had been significantly worsened by factors such as widespread conflicts in the region, including an offensive by the Rwanda-backed March 23 Movement in North Kivu— which had displaced thousands of civilians, most of whom had been forced to gather in refugee camps around Goma or in the city itself— , widespread extreme poverty, poor access to healthcare services, and the circulation of the infection within sex workers in illicit mining industries. Medair's health advisor in the DRC, Pierre Olivier Ngadjole, said that around 70% of the new mpox cases registered in the Goma area between June and August 2024 had involved people living in displacement camps, while the director of the Bulengo refugee camp, Mahoro Faustin, expressed concerns over the lack of testing kits available in the area.

=== Countries with limited local transmission ===
As of August 2024, fifteen countries have reported cases of mpox; the WHO reported that new cases of the mpox strain, all of which linked to the outbreak in the DRC, had been identified for the first time in four East African nations: Burundi, Kenya, Rwanda, and Uganda. Ivory Coast also reported new cases for the first time.

==== Central African Republic ====
On 30 July 2024, the Minister of Health of the Central African Republic, Pierre Somsé, declared an outbreak of mpox in Bangui following a period when the disease was mostly restricted to rural areas. Somsé reported that some families in the country were hiding infected relatives in fear of being stigmatized, thus increasing the risk of transmission of the disease.

Germany

In October 2024 the first travel-associated case of mpox clade 1b was reported in Germany. In 2024-2025 more travel-associated cases were reported by Germany's Public Health Agency. In early 2026, local transmission in Germany was confirmed in Germany during in outbreak in Berlin.

==== Sweden ====
On 15 August 2024, Sweden's Public Health Agency reported the first case outside Africa, which involved a person who had contracted clade I mpox during a stay in an area of Africa affected by the outbreak. In a public statement, the agency said that, while the case in itself did not represent a higher risk to the general population, occasional imported cases "may continue to occur".

==== Thailand ====
On 21 August 2024, Thailand's Department of Disease Control confirmed a mpox case involving a 66-year-old European man who was a resident of Thailand, and had returned from an African country affected by the outbreak, with his flight transiting through an undisclosed Middle Eastern country. The strain was later confirmed to be clade 1b. The patient who tested positive for clade Ib was a European male who arrived in Bangkok last week from Africa, according to the Department of Disease Control of Thailand's health ministry.

==== South Africa ====
On 23 September 2026, the South African Health Department reported that 22 cases of mpox had been confirmed (18 in the Western Cape, 3 in Gauteng, 1 in Kwazulu Natal).

==== Spain ====
In December 2025, Spanish authorities reported what is believed to be the first case of human-to-human transmission of mpox clade 1b outside of Africa without any known travel link.

=== Clade II cases ===
Some countries have reported contemporary mpox cases that then turned out to be infections with clade II variants, presumably unrelated to the clade Ib outbreak. There is a global outbreak of clade II infections that began in 2022.

==== Pakistan ====
On 15 August 2024, Pakistan's National Command and Operation Center (NCOC) reported a suspected case of mpox in the province of Khyber Pakhtunkhwa, involving a resident of Mardan who had recently returned from an Arab Gulf state; the person was later confirmed to have been diagnosed with mpox by the Pakistani Ministry of Health, although sequencing of viral samples was still ongoing in order to determine the nature of the variant.

On 17 August, the health department of Khyber Pakhtunkhwa confirmed that two patients had tested positive for mpox, while another one was waiting for confirmation; all of the patients had recently returned to Pakistan from the United Arab Emirates.

On 19 August, another suspected mpox case was reported, involving a resident of Azad Kashmir who had just returned from a Middle Eastern country; however, the Ministry of Health stated that none of the reported cases in the country had been caused by clade 1b of the virus.

==== Taiwan ====
On 18 August 2024, the Public Health Bureau of the city council of Tainan, Taiwan, announced that as of 16 August, three cases of mpox—all of which involved men who have had close contact with unspecified people—had been confirmed in the city since the start of the year; further details about the patients' traveling history and the variant were not disclosed.

==== Portugal ====
On 16 August, Portugal's Directorate-General of Health (DGS) confirmed that three new cases of mpox had been confirmed in the country between May and July 2024; the agency reported that all of the cases had been detected in the North Region, with two of them having travelled abroad during the incubation period of the disease. However, the DGS said that all of the three patients had contracted clade IIb mpox, whereas no clade I cases had been reported.

==== Indonesia ====
On 17 August 2024, Indonesia's Independence day, the national Ministry of Health (Kemenkes) reported a total of 14 confirmed mpox cases from January to April 2024. This brought the cumulative total to 88 cases in Indonesia when combined with the previous outbreak's 73 cases reported in 2023, as well as one case from 2022. The Indonesian government later reported a 100% recovery rate of all 88 confirmed cases since 2022. The latest outbreak, which initially began in Jakarta, then spread to the Riau Islands. Among the total cases, 87 patients had been declared cured, with 54 cases involving the clade IIb variant. The distribution of cases by region included 59 in Jakarta, 13 in West Java, nine in Banten, three in East Java, three in the Special Region of Yogyakarta (DIY), and one in the Riau Islands.

As of 4 September 2024, there were no known cases of Clade Ib mpox in Indonesia; 11 cases that were previously suspected to belong to Clade Ib had all returned negative from further PCR tests. Following the detection of multiple suspected cases across different points in Indonesia, including Bali and Jakarta, between August and September, the Indonesian government decided to partially restore its past COVID-19 mitigation efforts, including the use of the SATUSEHAT health pass for all travelers entering Indonesia.

==== Philippines ====
On 19 August 2024, the Philippines' Department of Health (DOH) announced that a 33-year-old male from Metro Manila, with no prior history of traveling overseas, had tested positive for mpox the day prior. The patient was later determined to have contracted clade II mpox.

==== New Zealand ====
On 9 September 2024, an mpox case was confirmed in New Zealand after attending the Winter Pride festival in Queenstown in August 2024. On 11 September, a second mpox case was linked to the Queenstown Winter Pride festival. By 20 September, a total of 11 cases of mpox were linked to the Winter Pride festival. The Queenstown outbreak included several cases of mpox clade II.

== Virology ==
Mpox is caused by the monkeypox virus. The virus is transmitted through close contact with infected animals or people, including in-person communication and other kinds of physical contact, contaminated bedsheets, clothing or needles, sexual contact, and consumption of contaminated meat.

In April 2024, researchers identified a novel subgroup of clade I of mpox in Kamituga, a mining town in South Kivu, Democratic Republic of the Congo. Epidemiologists reported that the new variant—later named "clade Ib" or "clade 1b"—had the potential to spread with greater ease compared to other mpox strains. The researchers theorized that the strain had undergone genetic mutations, allowing it to spread more easily through human transmission due to the mining town's remote location significantly limiting contact with animals that naturally carry and spread the disease. DRC's National Institute of Biomedical Research reported that this marked "a new phase of mpox" from the prior outbreak in 2022 and 2023, since the new variant produced lesions predominantly on the genitals, making it more difficult to diagnose compared to strains that caused chest, feet, and hand lesions. It was thought that the new variant could have a higher likelihood of silent transmission due to its different manifestations. The research team determined the detected form to be a Clade I type strain, which historically has caused more severe symptoms in comparison to the Clade II type that was predominant during the 2022–2023 mpox outbreak.

2024 genetic sequences of mpox from Republic of the Congo suggest that there are multiple co-circulating strains.

== Prevention and mitigation ==
In early January 2023, the New Zealand Government purchased 5,000 vials of mpox vaccines, enough for 20,000 people. A further shipment of vaccine vials was ordered for the later half of 2023. Individuals eligible for the mpox vaccine included close physical contacts of people with mpox including sexual partners and household contacts; gay, bisexual, and other men who have sex with multiple partners, transgender and cisgender women who are in sexual relationships with these men; and those recommended to have the vaccine by medical specialists.

Until June 2024, mpox vaccines were not approved by any African government, and the Strategic Advisory Group of Experts had not attested to the efficacy of vaccines. The director of the WHO's Health Emergencies Programme, Michael J. Ryan, noted in an interview with NPR that the Democratic Republic of the Congo was simultaneously facing several other endemic diseases, including measles and cholera. Up to that point, only two labs in the DRC could perform polymerase chain reaction testing for mpox.

Also in June 2024, authorities in the DRC had approved the vaccines MVA-BN (Jynneos) manufactured by Bavarian Nordic, and LC16, manufactured by KM Biologics, for emergency use. Jynneos was later approved in Nigeria, also for emergency use. Both countries officially started vaccination campaigns for mpox by the end of August of the same year.

Also in August 2024, the chief executive officer of GAVI, Sania Nishtar, said the organization had already allocated up to $500 million as part of their "First Response" fund—which had originally been set up during the COVID-19 pandemic, mostly through donations by governments and global health funders, but was later kept in place to respond to new health emergencies. However, Nishtar said that GAVI and UNICEF still had to wait for official requests from the countries affected by the outbreak, as well as definitive approval of mpox vaccines from the World Health Organization, to start ordering the doses and distributing them to affected nations. In response, the WHO announced the launch of a process that would enable access to vaccines for emergency use in countries whose national approval was still pending.

On 14 August, the U.S. Department of Health and Human Services (HHS) announced that the national government would donate 50,000 doses of the MVA-BN/Jynneos vaccine to the DRC. The HHS also said that the U.S. had previously provided US$17 million to "support clade I mpox preparedness and response efforts in Central and Eastern Africa".

On 16 August, Bavarian Nordic announced in a press statement that it had submitted clinical data to the European Medicines Agency to support the extension of the approval of MVA-BN/Jynneos to include adolescents aged 12 to 17 years; the company cited as evidence the early results of a trial—sponsored by the NIH's National Institutes of Allergy and Infectious Diseases (NIAID)—in 315 adolescents included in the aforementioned age range and 211 adults aged 18 to 50 years, which showed that both the immune responses and the safety profile were similar between the two age groups after vaccination with two standard doses. In the same statement, Bavarian Nordic also stated that a study of the vaccine in children aged 2 to 12 years would take place in the DRC and Uganda later in 2024.

Also on 16 August, China's General Administration of Customs declared that national authorities would deploy screening measures for people and goods entering the country from areas affected by the outbreak for the following six months. By 17 August, Pakistan had started screening travelers at all airports and at border crossings with surrounding countries.

On 17 August, the Africa CDC announced that they had pledged to distribute 10 million doses of the mpox vaccine by 2025 and that Bavarian Nordic had agreed to enhance vaccine manufacturing capabilities across Africa, to increase local supplies and reduce production costs. The association's Director General, Jean Kaseya, later pleaded with foreign countries not to implement travel bans against African nations, as it had previously happened during the COVID-19 pandemic.

On 19 August, the DRC's Minister of Public Health, Samuel Roger Kamba Mulamba, said in a press conference that the DRC needed about 3.5 million doses of mpox vaccines, with roughly 215,000 doses set to be donated by Belgium and up to three million doses being donated by Japan, and further donations being expected by the United States.

On 21 August, Germany's Federal Ministry of Health said that the federal government had previously accumulated 117,000 doses of the Jynneos vaccine, which had then been transferred to the Bundeswehr; on 26 August, the German government publicly announced that it would donate 100,000 vaccines to the DRC and Burundi, as well as other neighbouring African countries. The government's spokesman, Steffen Hebestreit, also said that Germany would lend financial support both to the WHO and partners in Africa, in the latter case through the GAVI Vaccine Alliance, while also collaborating with the African Union to enhance local vaccine production.

On 28 August, the Africa CDC said that they had received roughly 10% of the estimated $245 million-fund they had requested to tackle the outbreak across the continent.

On 4 September, Indonesia's Ministry of Health (Kemenkes) started implementing a preventive vaccination program, using the MVA-BN/Jynneos vaccine, which would prioritized regions that had reported Mpox cases, due to limited availability.

On 5 September, a study published in the journal Cell showed that a new mRNA-based mpox vaccine, developed by Moderna, reportedly offered better protection in non-human primates than Bavarian Nordic's Jynneos vaccine.

=== Global access to mpox vaccines ===
On 23 August 2024, the World Health Organization announced that partners like GAVI and UNICEF could start purchasing mpox vaccines before they received official approval from the agency, to expedite vaccine distribution across the African countries affected by the outbreak. The WHO, which had already invited vaccine manufacturers to submit an Expression of Interest for Emergency Use Listing (EUL) of their products on 9 August, was expected to grant an emergency license to the MVA-BN/Jynneos and LC16 vaccines in September 2024. Writing for The New York Times, journalist Stephanie Nolen noted that the delayed approval of the mpox vaccines by the WHO—which she deemed as a "Byzantine process"—would mainly affect the low-income and middle-income countries depending on the agency for the pre-qualification process for vaccines and treatments. At the same time, the U.S. FDA and the European Union's EMA had already issued emergency licenses for the same vaccines during the previous outbreak in 2022 and 2023.

On 24 August, the United States was set to donate 10,000 mpox vaccines to Nigeria the following week; the U.S. Agency for International Development (USAID) said that it would also donate a further 50,000 doses to the Democratic Republic of the Congo, without specifying the arrival date, since Bavarian Nordic and the Congolese government were still discussing pre-shipment requirements for storage and handling of the vaccines. Helen Rees, a member of the Africa Centres for Disease Control and Prevention (Africa CDC)'s emergency committee for mpox, stated that the delay in granting Africa access to vaccines was "really outrageous," as the continent had already experienced similar struggles during the COVID-19 vaccination programme.

On 27 August, Nigeria's National Primary Health Care Development Agency (NPHCDA) announced that the country had received 10,000 doses of the MVA-BN/Jynneos vaccine as a donation from the US, making it the first African country to receive a batch since the start of the outbreak. On the same day, Spain's Ministry of Health (MISAN) announced that they would donate 20% of their national supplies of mpox vaccines, roughly corresponding to 100,000 vials and 500,000 doses, to several countries in Central Africa; the MISAN also urged the European Commission to extend the same proposal to every member country of the EU, stating that "it makes no sense to accumulate vaccines [in countries] where the problem doesn't exist, and this is the time to prove it."

On 5 September, the DRC's Ministry of Public Health, Samuel Roger Kamba Mulamba, announced that the country had received their first batch of mpox vaccines, consisting in 99,000 doses of MVA-BN/Jynneos, and that a further delivery on 7 September would take the total amount to 200,000 doses; both batches were donated by the EU's Health Emergency Preparedness and Response Authority (HERA). Vaccination programs subsequently were set to start in the state's most affected provinces in October and be handled by UNICEF, as the doses were distributed between Kinshasa, Lubumbashi and Goma. HERA's director, Laurent Muschel, said that the EU aimed to deliver at least 566,000 doses to the most affected countries in the region. Africa CDC's Director General, Jean Kaseya, said that the association would distribute a further 3,600,000 doses to Gabon, Burundi, Central African Republic and Ivory Coast in the following weeks; he also stated that vaccine manufacturing would start in Africa from 2025, with an estimated 85-90% cost reduction.

On 13 September, the WHO has granted prequalification status to the MVA-BN vaccine, manufactured by Bavarian Nordic, as the first vaccine approved for use against mpox. This vaccine, originally developed for use against smallpox, had previously only been available under an emergency use licence. Its use is aimed at controlling the spread of the disease in African countries severely affected by recent outbreaks. This approval, known as prequalification, comes as a new strain of the virus spreads from the Democratic Republic of Congo to neighboring nations. The prequalification helps developing countries access the vaccine, as they often lack the resources to conduct thorough safety and efficacy tests. U.N. agencies also depend on this process before purchasing medical products. Bavarian Nordic announced it could supply 13 million doses of its mpox vaccine by the end of 2025, with the potential to increase supply by an additional 50 million doses in 12–18 months, pending demand and regulatory approvals. The company is exploring capacity expansion as the WHO declared mpox a global health emergency, but vaccine shortages have hindered containment efforts.

On 25 September, Bavarian Nordic received a $63 million order from the U.S. government to produce additional bulk product and 1 million freeze-dried doses of its mpox and smallpox vaccine, Jynneos, to be delivered by 2026. The bulk product intended to replenish inventory used during the 2022 mpox outbreak. The order came after the World Health Organization declared mpox a global public health emergency for the second time due to an outbreak in the Democratic Republic of Congo in August 2024.

== See also ==
- Mpox in the Democratic Republic of the Congo
- Mpox in Nigeria
- 2022–2023 mpox outbreak
