= Rijk Gispen =

Dutch virologist

- Born: 25 November 1910; Zwolle
- Died: 6 December 2000; Bilthoven
- Citizenship: Dutch
- Occupation: virologist
- Medical career
- Research: Study of Orthopoxviruses

Rijk Gispen (25 November 1910 – 6 December 2000), was a Dutch virologist and former Director of the National Institute of Public Health in the Netherlands. He is well known for his research in immunology and the study of Orthopoxviruses.

In 1949, he reported naturally occurring pox infections in non-human primates. Fifteen years later, he isolated monkeypox virus from healthy monkey kidneys in the Netherlands, "silent monkeypox virus infections". At the time, the virus appeared indistinguishable from smallpox. Despite the finding being of some debate, it gave cause for concern and provided the impetus to continue World Health Organization (WHO) field research into the potential existence of a smallpox reservoir.

In the 1970s, he contributed to the immunology of orthopoxvirus infections by being the first to develop means of distinguishing between antibodies due to infections with variola, vaccinia and monkeypox.

== Early life ==
Rijk Gispen was born in 1910 to Willem Hendrik Gispen, a minister, and Anna Maria Catharina van der Dussen.

== Career ==
At the age of 27, he was promoted by J.J. van Loghem (1878–1968) and travelled to the Dutch East Indies to take up a post with Professor Johannes Ernst Dinger (1892–1983). Following the second world war, Gispen succeeded Dinger at the Queen Wilhelmina Institute for Hygiene and Bacteriology in Batavia. In 1951 he was appointed director of Fundamental Scientific Research at the National Institute for Public Health (RIV) and in 1958 he became head of the newly established Laboratory of Virology, a centre he helped design. Three years later, he was appointed professor of virology at the Utrecht University. Between 1963 and 1966, he was one of the editors of the Dutch Journal of Medicine.

Throughout the 1970s, he contributed to the immunology of orthopoxvirus infections by being the first to develop means of distinguishing between antibodies due to infections with variola, vaccinia and monkeypox.

As a member of the Health Council, he frequently advised government on matters including the use of enhanced inactivated polio vaccine for immunizing infants.

=== Orthopoxviruses ===
Subsequent to experiences with the measures to control yellow fever and malaria, it became apparent that the eradication of smallpox relied upon the knowledge that no animal reservoir existed. Hence, the search for a reservoir continued. Up until 1968, seven suspected smallpox cases in monkeys were reported, but Gispen's case was the only one that confirmed the disease by isolating the virus in 1949. Two orangutans in a Djakarta zoo became unwell during a smallpox epidemic amongst humans. It was concluded that human-to-orangutan transmission had taken place and not animal-to-animal.

“Silent monkeypox virus infections” were observed on three separate occasions during the 1964 and 1965 outbreaks in cynomolgus colonies in the Netherlands. In 1964, Gispen isolated two viruses from the kidneys of laboratory monkeys that were not unwell. The monkeys remained without symptoms. These viruses appeared identical to smallpox. A number of further discoveries of the smallpox-like virus were later isolated from chimpanzees in West Africa and in well sun-squirrels. These incidents gave cause for concern and provided the impetus to continue WHO field research into the potential existence of a smallpox reservoir. A personal correspondence from Gispen's colleague, J. G. Kapsenberg in the early 1980s, revealed that the cases of silent monkeypox were probably a result of contamination from monkeypox virus isolated in the same laboratory that tested samples from cases at an outbreak at Rotterdam Zoo. Gispen also demonstrated cross protection from monkeypox in monkeys with smallpox vaccine.

== Death ==
He died on 6 December 2000 in Bilthoven, at the age of 90.

== Selected publications ==
Gispen published numerous papers and has been cited on many occasions.

== See also ==
- Derrick Baxby
