= Derivative (chemistry) =

Compound that is derived from a similar compound by a chemical reaction

In chemistry, a derivative is a compound that is derived from a similar compound by a chemical reaction, or that can be imagined to arise from another compound, if one atom or group of atoms is replaced with another atom or group of atoms. The exact definition of "derivative" depends on the specific context.

The related term structural analogue is common in organic chemistry.

In biochemistry, the word is used for compounds that at least theoretically can be formed from the precursor compound.

Chemical derivatives may be used to facilitate analysis. For example, melting point (MP) analysis can assist in identification of many organic compounds. A crystalline derivative may be prepared, such as a semicarbazone or 2,4-dinitrophenylhydrazone (derived from aldehydes or ketones), as a simple way of verifying the identity of the original compound, assuming that a table of derivative MP values is available. Prior to the advent of spectroscopic analysis, such methods were widely used.

In analytical chemistry, derivatization can be used to convert analytes into other species for improving detection. For example, polar groups such as N-H or O-H can be converted into less polar groups. This reaction reduces the boiling point of the molecule, allowing non-volatile compounds to be analyzed by gas chromatography.

== See also ==
- Derivatization
- Precursor (chemistry)
- Product (chemistry)
- Structural analog
