= Samuel Roger Kamba Mulamba =

Congolese (DRC) politician

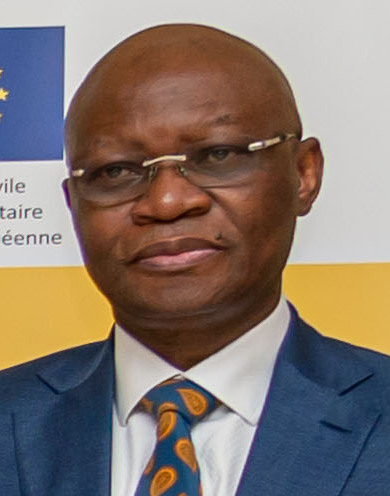
Samuel Roger Kamba Mulamba in 2026

Samuel Roger Kamba Mulamba is the Minister of Public Health in the Democratic Republic of the Congo, who took office in 2023.

He has worked for over 30 years as a doctor, specialising in pediatrics.

He has been involved dealing with the 2023–2024 mpox epidemic.
