= Thiosemicarbazone =

Class of chemical compounds

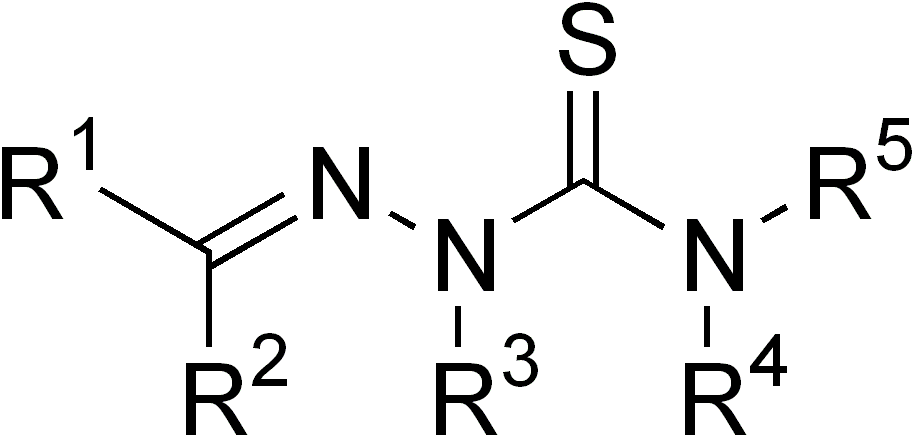
General chemical structure of a thiosemicarbazone

A thiosemicarbazone is an organosulfur compound with the formula H_{2}NC(S)NHN=CR_{2}. Many variations exist, including those where some or all of the NH centers are substituted by organic groups. Thiosemicarbazones are usually produced by condensation of a thiosemicarbazide with an aldehyde or ketone:

H_{2}NC(S)NHNH_{2} + O=CR_{2} → H_{2}NC(S)NHN=CR_{2} + H_{2}O

In terms of their chemical structures, the CSN3 core atoms are coplanar.

== Occurrence and applications ==
Some thiosemicarbazones have medicinal properties, e.g. the antiviral metisazone and the antibiotic thioacetazone. Thiosemicarbazones are also widely used as ligands in coordination chemistry. The affinity of thiosemicarbazones for metal ions is exploited in controlling iron overload.
