= Carbazide =

Functional group

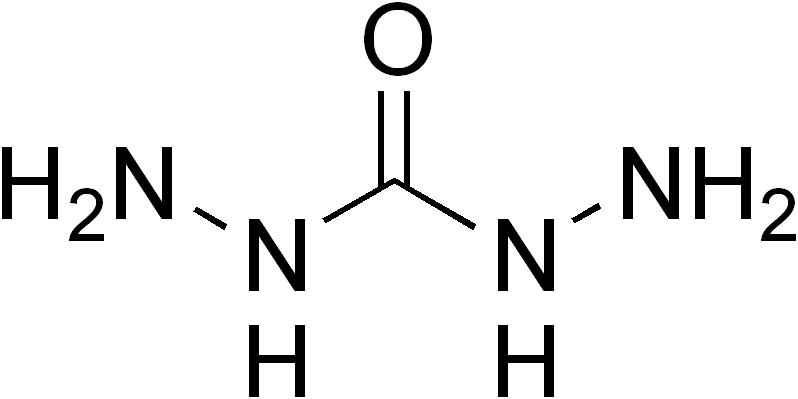
Carbohydrazide, the simplest carbazide

Diphenylcarbazide

In chemistry, a carbazide is a functional group with the general formula RNH−NH(C=O)NH−NHR. They can be derived from the condensation of carbonic acid with a hydrazine. Carbohydrazide is the simplest carbazide, with another common carbazide being diphenylcarbazide, which is used as an analytical reagent.

== Thiocarbazide ==
The sulfur analog is called a thiocarbazide, of which thiocarbohydrazide is the simplest example.

== Carbazone and thiocarbazone ==
A carbazone is a partially oxidized carbazide with the general formula R=NNH(C=O)NH−NHR. The sulfur analog is called a thiocarbazone, of which dithizone is an example.

== See also ==
- Semicarbazide
- Semicarbazone
