= Thiosemicarbazide =

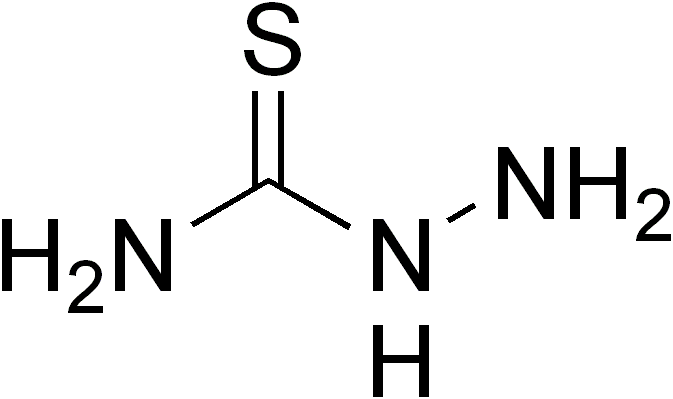

Names
- Preferred IUPAC name Hydrazinecarbothioamide
- Other names N-Aminothiourea, Aminothiourea

Identifiers
CAS Number	79-19-6
3D model (JSmol)	Interactive image
ChEMBL	ChEMBL256250
ChemSpider	2005980
ECHA InfoCard	100.001.077
EC Number	201-184-7
PubChem CID	2723789
UNII	6056O8W6ET
UN number	2811 2771
CompTox Dashboard (EPA)	DTXSID9021346
- InChI: InChI=1S/CH5N3S/c2-1(5)4-3/h3H2,(H3,2,4,5) Key: BRWIZMBXBAOCCF-UHFFFAOYSA-N
- SMILES: C(=S)(N)NN

Properties
Chemical formula	CH_{5}N_{3}S
Molar mass	91.13 g·mol^{−1}
Appearance	white solid
Density	1.465 g/cm^{3}
Melting point	183 °C (361 °F; 456 K)

Hazards
- GHS labelling
Pictograms	(GHS06: Toxic)
Signal word	Danger
Hazard statements	H300, H412
Precautionary statements	P264, P270, P273, P301+P310, P321, P330, P405, P501
- Except where otherwise noted, data are given for materials in their standard state (at 25 °C [77 °F], 100 kPa). Infobox references

Thiosemicarbazide is the chemical compound with the formula H_{2}NC(S)NHNH_{2}. A white, odorless solid, it is related to thiourea (H_{2}NC(S)NH_{2}) by the insertion of an NH center. They are commonly used as ligands for transition metals. Many thiosemicarbazides are known. These feature an organic substituent in place of one or more H's of the parent molecule. 4-Methyl-3-thiosemicarbazide is a simple example.

According to X-ray crystallography, the CSN_{3} core of the molecule is almost planar as are the three H atoms nearest the thiocarbonyl group. This can be explained by models of electron delocalisation.

== Reactions ==
Thiosemicarbazides are precursors to thiosemicarbazones. They are precursors to heterocycles. Formylation of thiosemicarbazide provides access to triazole.

== Applications ==
Some of the known uses of thiosemicarbazide include in the synthesis of: Nicothiazone, Methisazone, Tegaserod, Isobuzole, Ambazone & Citenazone.
