= Cell Journal =

- Discipline: Molecular biology, Cell therapy, Regenerative medicine, Stem cell biology, Reproductive medicine, Medical genetics, Immunology, Oncology, Clinical biochemistry, Neuroscience, Tissue engineering
- Language: English
- Edited by: Ahmad Hosseini

Publication details
- Former name: Yakhteh Medical Journal
- History: 1999–present
- Publisher: Royan Institute (Iran)
- Frequency: Monthly
- Impact factor: 1.7 (2023)

Standard abbreviations
- ISO 4: Cell J.

Indexing
- ISSN: 2228-5806 (print); 2228-5814 (web)
- OCLC no.: 828104801

Links
- Journal homepage; Online access; Online archive

Cell Journal is a quarterly peer-reviewed scientific journal.The aim of the journal is to disseminate information by publishing the most recent scientific research studies based on medical and developmental biology including cell therapy and regenerative medicine, stem cell biology, reproductive medicine, medical genetics, immunology, oncology, clinical biochemistry, neuroscience, and tissue engineering. It was established in 1999 as Yakhteh Medical Journal, obtaining its current name in 2010. It is published by the Royan Institute and the editor-in-chief is Ahmad Hosseini (Shahid Beheshti University of Medical Sciences). According to the Journal Citation Reports, the journal has a 2023 impact factor of 1.7 Cell J is an open access journal. This journal holds the membership of the Committee on Publication Ethics (COPE) .
