= Rotterdam Zoo mpox outbreak =

Outbreak of mpox at Rotterdam Zoo
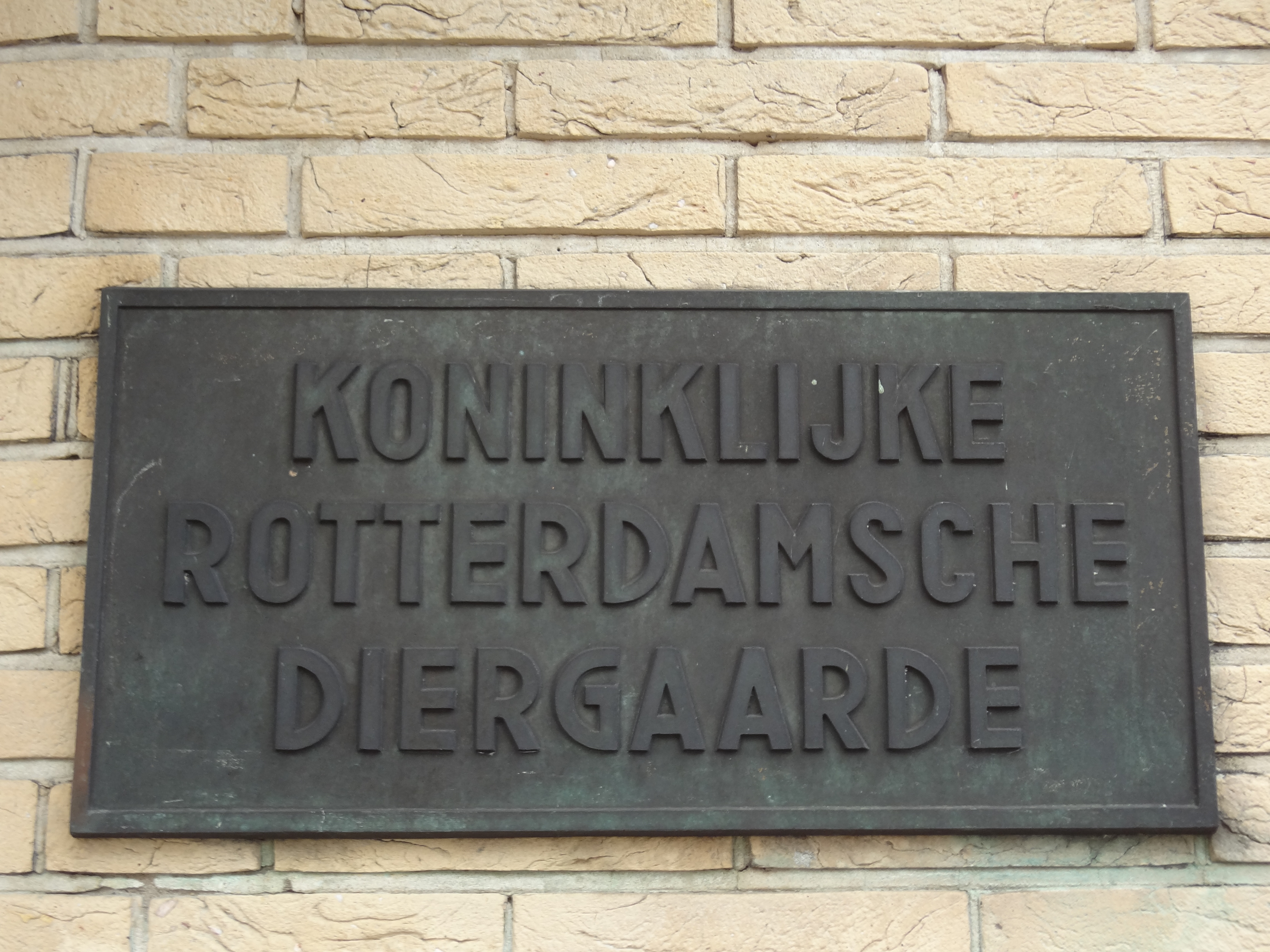
- Rotterdam Zoo
- Disease: Mpox
- Pathogen: Monkeypox virus
- Location: Rotterdam Zoo
- First outbreak: 21 December 1964
- First reported: 1964
- Index case: Central/South American giant anteaters
- Arrival date: December 1964
- Confirmed cases: 21 non-human primates, 2 anteaters (no human cases)
- Deaths: 11
- Fatality rate: ~50%

In 1964 there was an outbreak of mpox, then known as monkeypox, at Rotterdam Zoo, where two Central/South American giant anteaters were first identified with the disease. Until then, mpox was thought to occur only in primates. Housed in one large enclosure, the monkeypox virus subsequently spread to several orangutans, chimpanzees, gorillas, guenons, squirrel monkeys, macaques, marmosets and gibbons.

Unlike previous mpox outbreaks in laboratory monkeys, the outbreak in Rotterdam Zoo occurred in animals that were not for laboratory use, showed varying clinical presentations, and was particularly severe for orangutans. There were no reports of cases of transmission to humans.

In total, 11 of the 23 affected animals died, including six orangutans, the anteaters, three squirrel monkeys, the only one Asian gibbon and an American common marmoset. Several were complicated by fatal secondary bacterial infections.

== Origin ==
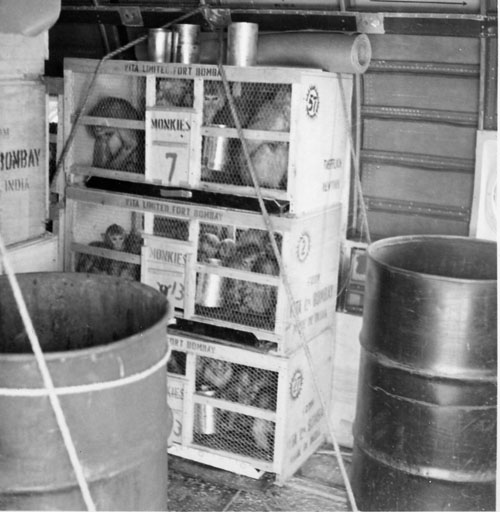
Caged monkeys onboard Transocean Air Lines flight in the mid-1950s

Between 1958 and 1968, mainly for the purpose of producing and testing the polio vaccine, a small number of non-human primates from Africa and a larger number from Asia were being imported to Europe and the US. During transit, there were often other wild animals with several opportunities to spread infection.

On 9 December 1964, without being quarantined, two Central/South American giant anteaters arrived at Rotterdam Zoo, and on 21 December developed a blistering rash. The lesions appeared on the tongue, nose, legs and soles of feet. A diagnosis of mpox was confirmed at the National Institute for Public Health and the Environment laboratory in Utrecht. Until 1964, mpox was thought to occur only in primates. The anteaters had been bought from dealers, and the virus was suspected to have been contracted from previous contact with infected monkeys elsewhere, possibly from close contact with a shipment of Malaysian cynomolgus monkeys. (Note: Anteaters are not considered to play a role in the natural lifecycle of monkeypox virus. However, animals in captivity appear particularly vulnerable due to crowding, species mixing, or physiological stress.)

== Outbreak ==
Ten days after the onset of sickness in the anteaters, two Asian orangutans that were housed in a glass cage nearby, developed small blisters. Whether transmission was by air or contaminated objects is not clear. The disease spread to several other orangutans, who became unwell with yellow nasal discharge and lesions on their face, body and legs. Also affected, and all housed in one large enclosure, were chimpanzees, gorillas, guenons, squirrel monkeys, macaques, marmosets and gibbons.

Affected animals typically had a generalised illness, some with skin lesions, and several died during early symptoms, before the spots appeared. Unlike previous mpox outbreaks in laboratory monkeys, the outbreak at Rotterdam Zoo occurred in animals that were not for laboratory use, showed varying clinical presentations, and was particularly severe for orangutans. All 10 orangutans became ill and six died, five of whom died before the onset of the rash. Of those orangutans that survived, recovery was prolonged. They found it difficult to eat, and the ones that died were noted to have suffered problems in breathing.

The affected chimpanzees had blisters on their lips and face, but were otherwise well. One of the two infected African gorillas became seriously sick, but both survived. Four of the infected guenons suffered mild illness with skin lesions. Most infected marmosets had mild symptoms. The Vervet monkey had subclinical infection; the Asian monkeys (cynomolgus monkey and rhesus macaque) were noted to have a generalised rash; and the baboons also experienced a generalised rash and severe illness. The only Asian gibbon presented with lesions on its face, limbs and body, and died 18-days after suffering severe illness. Two of the three affected squirrel monkeys had no rash. The owl-faced monkey became ill with sores on their lips but recovered. Some of the marmosets had reddening and swellings around their eyes and nose with blisters on the face and tummy. One American common marmoset had a similar swelling, but with severe illness.

In total, 11 of the 23 affected animals died, including in addition to the orangutans and anteaters, all three squirrel monkeys, the Asian gibbon and the severely ill American common marmoset. Several were complicated by fatal bacterial infections.

No cases of transmission to humans were reported. Primates that had exposure but did not contract the disease included Ateles paniscus, red-faced spider monkey, black-headed spider monkey, siamang, Colombian white-faced capuchin, mona monkey, and L'Hoest's monkey.

== The laboratory ==
According to Isao Arita and Donald Henderson in 1976, how relevant that a strain of whitepox viruses, which resembled variola, were isolated from two cynomolgus monkeys at the National Institute for Public Health and the Environment three-months prior to the arrival of the anteaters was not clear. On 9 December 1964 and 4 May 1965, poxviruses resembling monkeypox were isolated from kidneys of cynomolgus monkeys at the same laboratory. A personal correspondence from Rijk Gispen's colleague, Jacoba G. Kapsenberg, in the early 1980s, revealed that the so-called cases of "silent monkeypox" were probably a result of contamination from monkeypox virus isolated from the Zoo cases. Six years after the outbreak, Gispen detected high levels of mpox neutralizing antibody in two of the surviving orangutans, and concluded that it lasts long after infection.

== Response ==
The antiviral methisazone was used unsuccessfully. Of more importance was the use of antibiotics to treat secondary bacterial infections. The outbreak was reported by J.C. Peters. The incident is an example of how an outbreak may occur in animals following an accidental infection of one susceptible other animal. No further outbreaks in captive monkeys occurred after 1968, as conditions for monkeys in transit improved, and Europe and the US increasingly bred their own monkeys.
