= Metisazone =

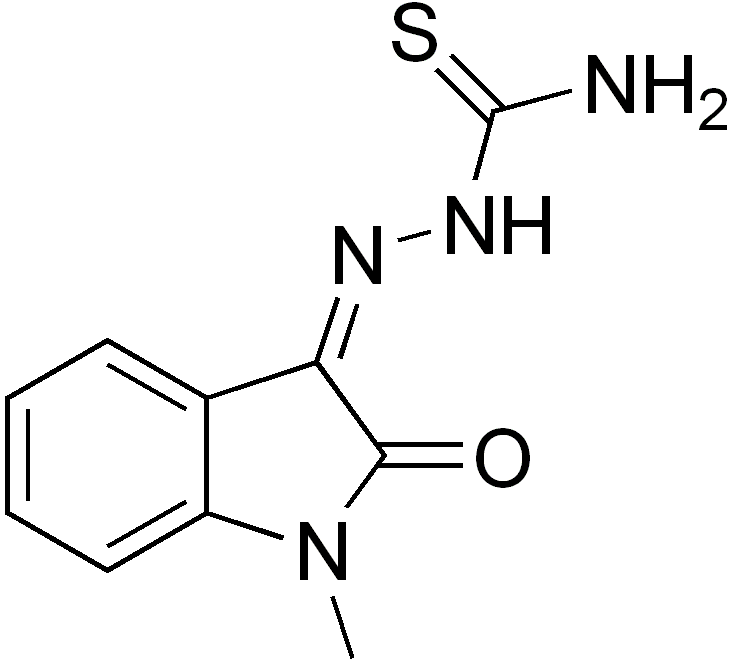

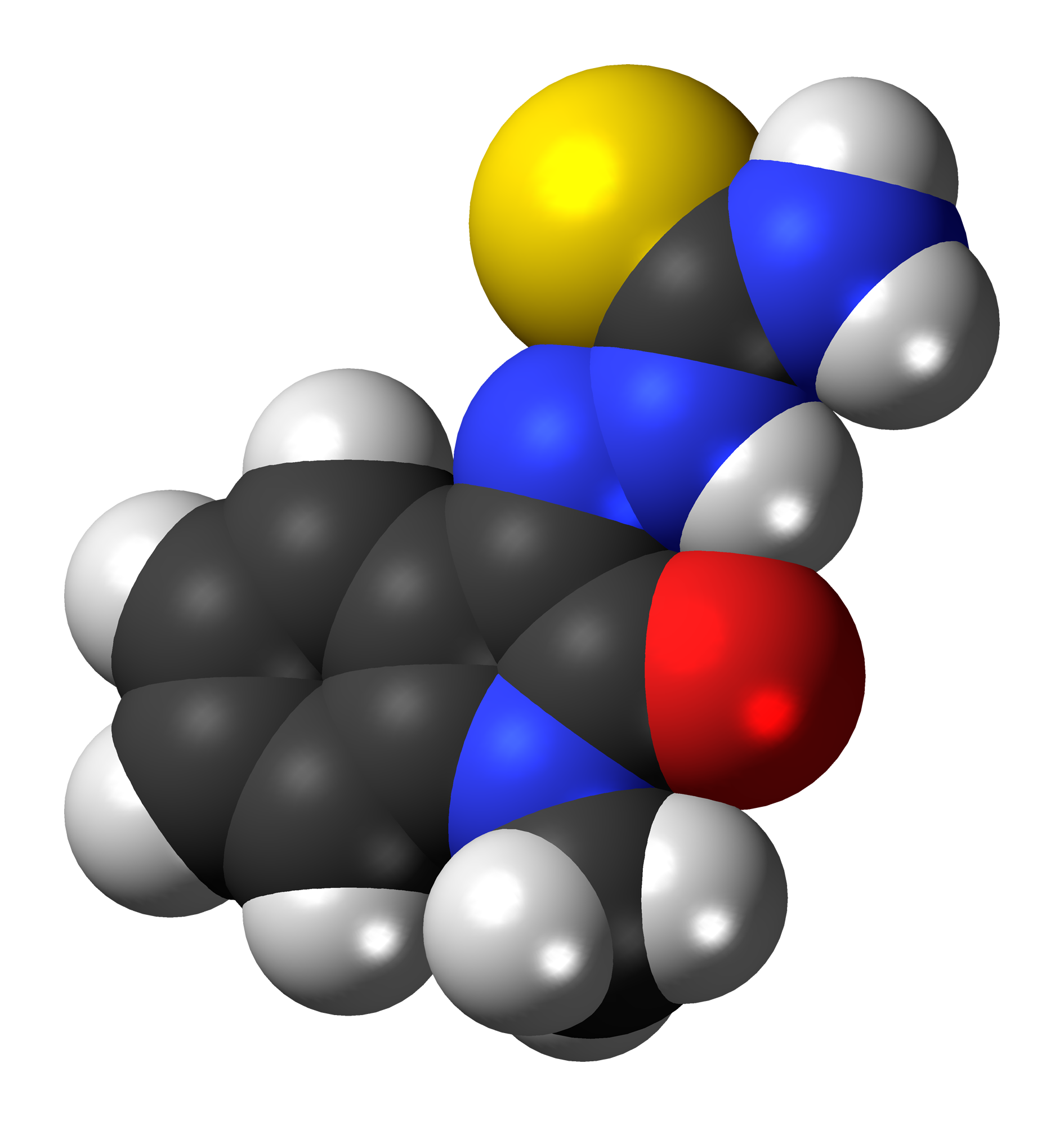

Names
- IUPAC name [(1-Methyl-2-oxoindol-3-ylidene)amino]thiourea
- Other names Metisazone

Identifiers
CAS Number	1910-68-5
3D model (JSmol)	Interactive image
ChEMBL	ChEMBL1512080
ChemSpider	5259074
ECHA InfoCard	100.016.016
EC Number	217-616-2
KEGG	D02496
MeSH	D008720
PubChem CID	6861563
UNII	K3QML4J07E
CompTox Dashboard (EPA)	DTXSID7046413
- InChI: InChI=1S/C10H10N4OS/c1-14-7-5-3-2-4-6(7)8(9(14)15)12-13-10(11)16/h2-5H,1H3,(H3,11,13,16)/b12-8- Key: DLGSOJOOYHWROO-WQLSENKSSA-N; InChI=1/C10H10N4OS/c1-14-7-5-3-2-4-6(7)8(9(14)15)12-13-10(11)16/h2-5H,1H3,(H3,11,13,16)/b12-8- Key: DLGSOJOOYHWROO-WQLSENKSBL
- SMILES: CN1C(=O)C(=NNC(N)=S)c2ccccc21

Properties
Chemical formula	C_{10}H_{10}N_{4}OS
Molar mass	234.28 g/mol

Pharmacology
ATC code	J05AA01 (WHO)
- Except where otherwise noted, data are given for materials in their standard state (at 25 °C [77 °F], 100 kPa). verify (what is ?) Infobox references

Methisazone (USAN) or metisazone (INN) is an antiviral drug that works by inhibiting mRNA and protein synthesis, especially in pox viruses. During trials in the 1960s it showed promising results against smallpox infection, but widespread use was considered logistically impractical in the developing countries facing smallpox cases, and it saw only limited use. In developed countries able to cope with the logistic challenge, treatment of smallpox could be achieved just as effectively with immunoglobulin therapy, without the severe nausea associated with metisazone.

Methisazone has been described as being used in prophylaxis since at least 1965.

The condensation of N-methylisatin with thiosemicarbazide leads to methisazone.
