= Mpox in the Democratic Republic of the Congo =

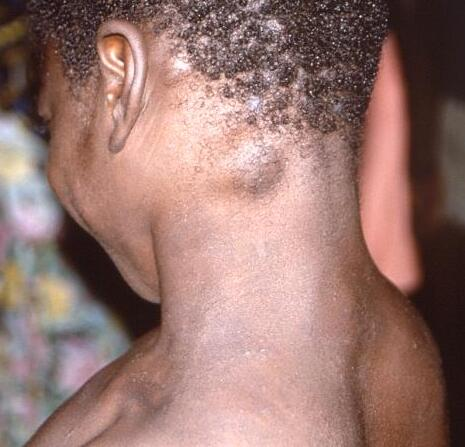
- Mpox (large lymph node in neck), DRC 1996/1997
- Disease: Mpox
- Pathogen: Monkeypox virus
- Source: Initially mainly animal contact in rainforest, later greater human-to-human transmission
- Location: Democratic Republic of the Congo

Mpox is endemic in western and central Africa, with the overwhelming majority of cases occurring in the Democratic Republic of the Congo (DRC), where the more virulent clade Ib has seen a rapid rise in infections since September 2023.

Many cases occur sporadically or in small clusters, but large outbreaks also occur.

== Early cases ==
The world's first case of human mpox was detected in a nine-month old child in 1970 in the Democratic Republic of the Congo (then Zaire), two years after it reported its last case of smallpox. The onset of their rash was on 24 August. That year, the disease was identified in another four children, including three in Liberia who were playmates. At the time, evidence of the virus was found in non-human primates in Liberia and Sierre Leone.

Active surveillance by the World Health Organization (WHO) between 1981 and 1986, identified 338 cases with a human-to-human transmission rate of 28%. Until 1986, 95% of cases worldwide were identified in the DRC. Cases were rare in people over the age of 15-years, and over two-thirds of infections could be traced to animal contact within the rainforests. Initially it was uncommon for a family member to contract the infection if they had a smallpox scar, evidence of prior vaccination.

== 1996 reemergence ==
A reemergence of the disease in the DRC in 1996 also saw a large number of reported but not all laboratory confirmed cases, with a high transmission rate and lower fatality rate; leading experts to believe a significant number may have actually been chicken pox. Some likely had both mpox and chickenpox at the same time. The DRC's Kasaï-Oriental region saw the largest number of cases during 1996–1997.

Between 1996 and 2005, mpox cases appeared to be gradually increasing in older people, with less than a quarter of cases being traced to rainforest animal contact, and with greater close contact infections. Between January 2001 and December 2004, 2,734 cases of suspected human mpox were reported from the DRC. However, civil war limited surveillance and only 171 clinical specimens were obtained from 136 suspected cases; less than 5% of all reported cases.

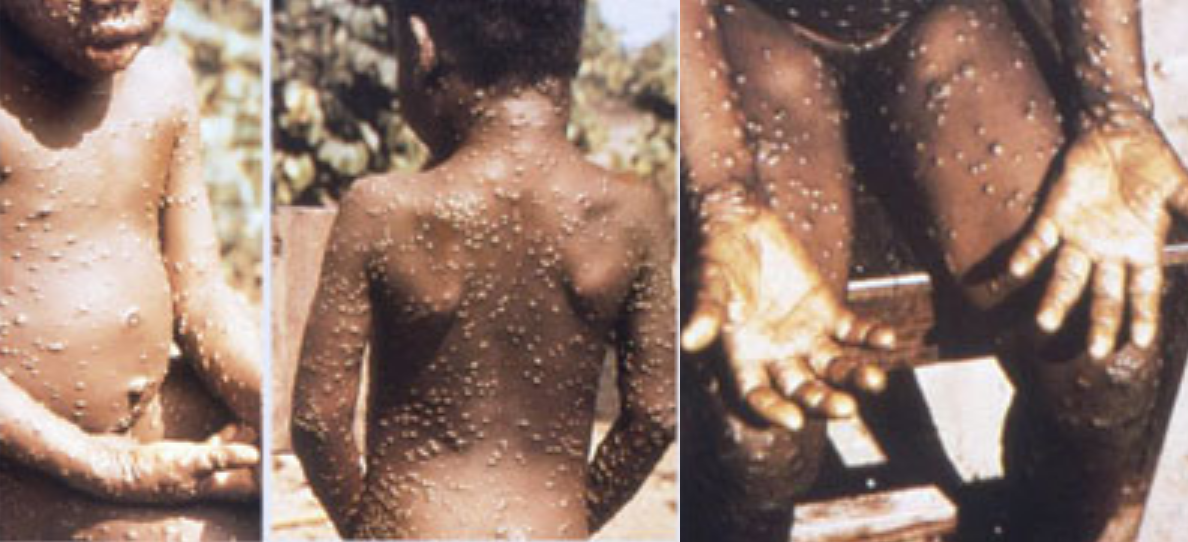
Mpox outbreak in DRC (1997)

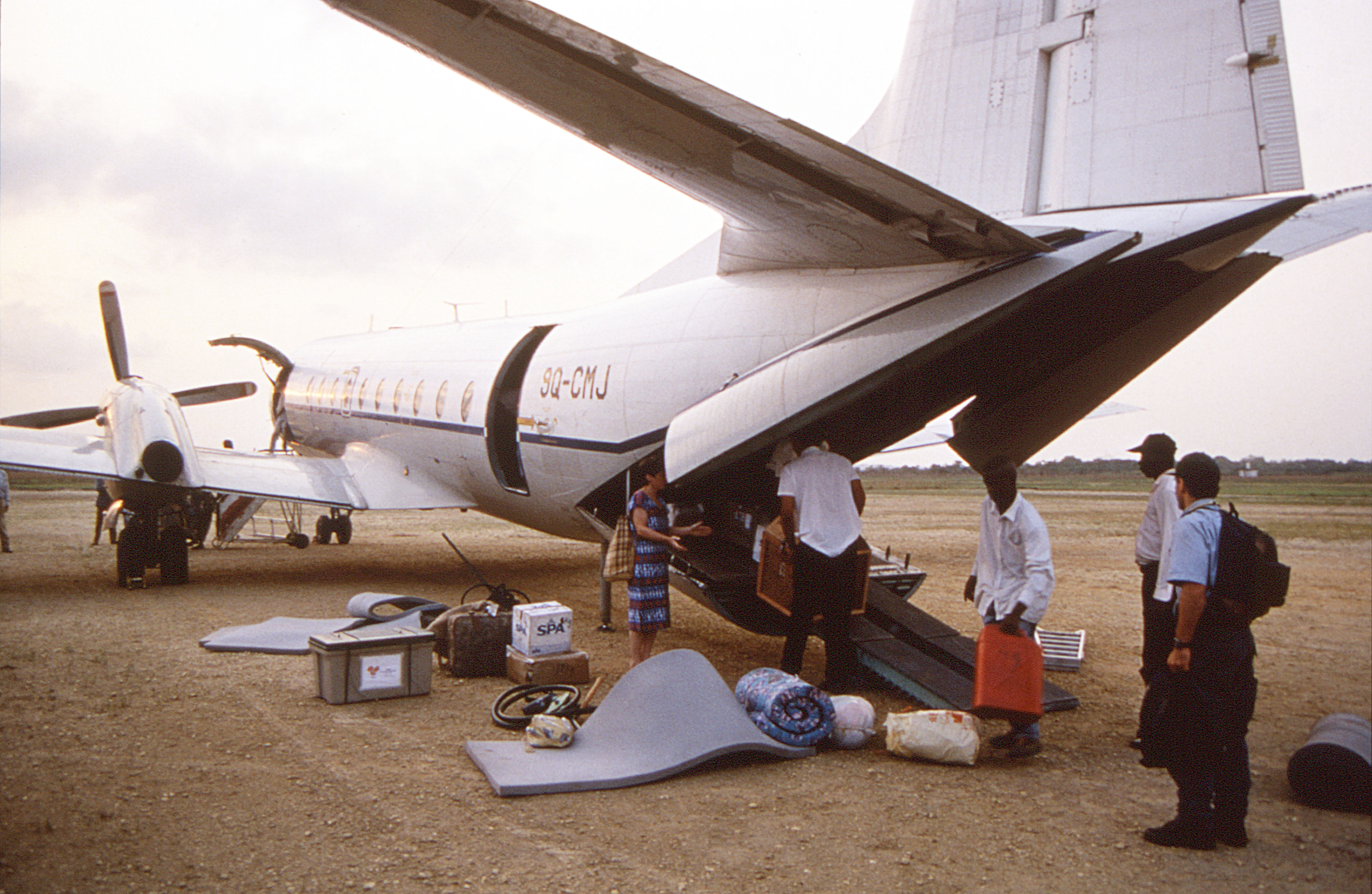
The US epidemiologic team after having landed at Lodja Airport - DRC 1997

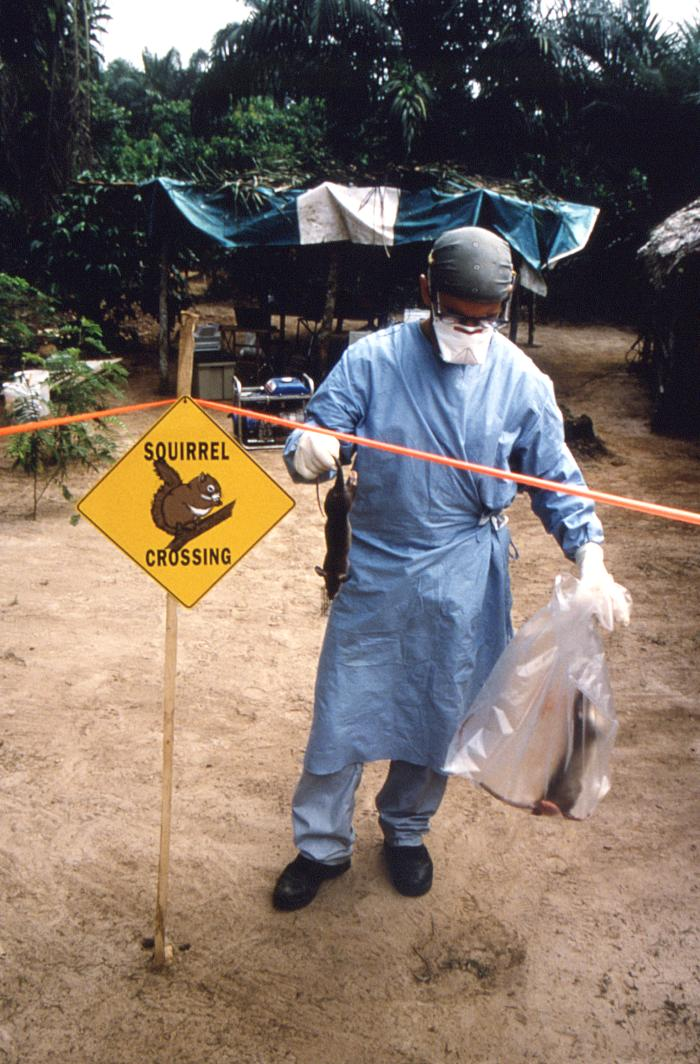
Testing of Gambian rats (1997)

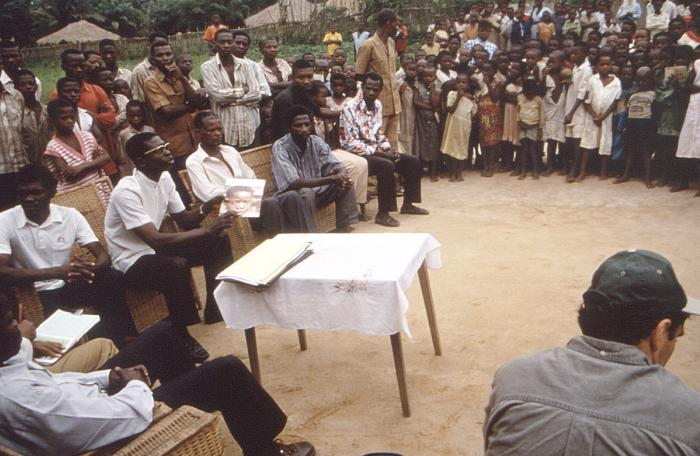
Educational meeting DRC (1997)

== 2005 onwards ==
After 2005, the DRC was reporting more than 1,000 suspected cases per year. Between November 2005 and November 2007, 760 laboratory-confirmed human mpox cases were detected; particularly in people living in forested areas, males, age less than 15-years, and no previous smallpox vaccination.

Many cases occur sporadically or in small clusters, but large outbreaks also occur. The risk of human-to-human transmission within households in the DRC was noted to range from 50% to 100% during the 2013 outbreak. The DRC's Bokungu Health Zone saw an increase in cases of 600-fold that year. In 2019 the DRC reported 3,794 suspected cases and 73 deaths. In the first nine-months of 2020, it reported over 4,500 suspected cases of mpox, including 171 deaths.

Mpox is reportable in the DRC, where the disease is endemic, and disease burden remains high. There, the more virulent clade I has been affecting some of the world's poorest and socially excluded communities. A regional surveillance system collects reports of all suspected mpox cases, and where possible, they may be investigated.

== 2023-2024 outbreak ==
During 2023, a clade I outbreak of mpox disease in the Democratic Republic of the Congo resulted in 14,626 suspected cases being reported, with 654 associated deaths, making for a case-fatality rate of 4.5%. The outbreak continued into 2024, with 3,576 suspected mpox cases and 265 deaths reported in the Democratic Republic of the Congo through the first nine weeks of the year, making for an estimated CFR of 7.4%.

Transmission of the virus in the outbreak appears to be primarily through sexual and close familial contact, with cases occurring in areas without a history of mpox, such as South Kivu and Kinshasa. An estimated 64% of the cases and 85% of fatalities have occurred in children. The outbreak consists of two separate sub-variants of clade I, with one of the sub-variants having a novel mutation, making detection with standard assays unreliable.

The outbreak spread to the neighbouring country of the Republic of the Congo, with 43 cases reported in March 2024. By August 2024, the outbreak spread further into central and southern Africa with cases of clade I and clade II strains reported in Burundi, Rwanda, Uganda, Kenya, Côte d'Ivoire, and South Africa.

The WHO declared a global health emergency in August 2024. Sweden became the first non-African country to report a case of clade I mpox. A case of mpox was confirmed in Pakistan.

On 19 August 2024, the DRC's Ministry of Public Health, Samuel-Roger Kamba Mulamba, said in a press conference that all of the country's provinces, including the capital city of Kinshasa, had been affected by the outbreak, while announcing that the national government would launch a €45 million response plan including awareness campaigns, medical team deployment and patient care, but not vaccines. Kamba also said that the DRC needed about 3.5 million doses of mpox vaccines, with roughly 215.000 doses set to be donated by Belgium and up to three million doses being donated by Japan, and further donations being expected by the United States. On 26 August, Germany's federal government publicly announced that it would donate 100,000 vaccines to the DRC and other neighbouring African countries.
