= Poultry disease =

Diseases affecting domesticated birds harvested for food

Poultry diseases occur in poultry, which are domesticated birds kept for their meat, eggs or feathers. Poultry species include the chicken, turkey, duck, goose and ostrich.

== Viral diseases ==
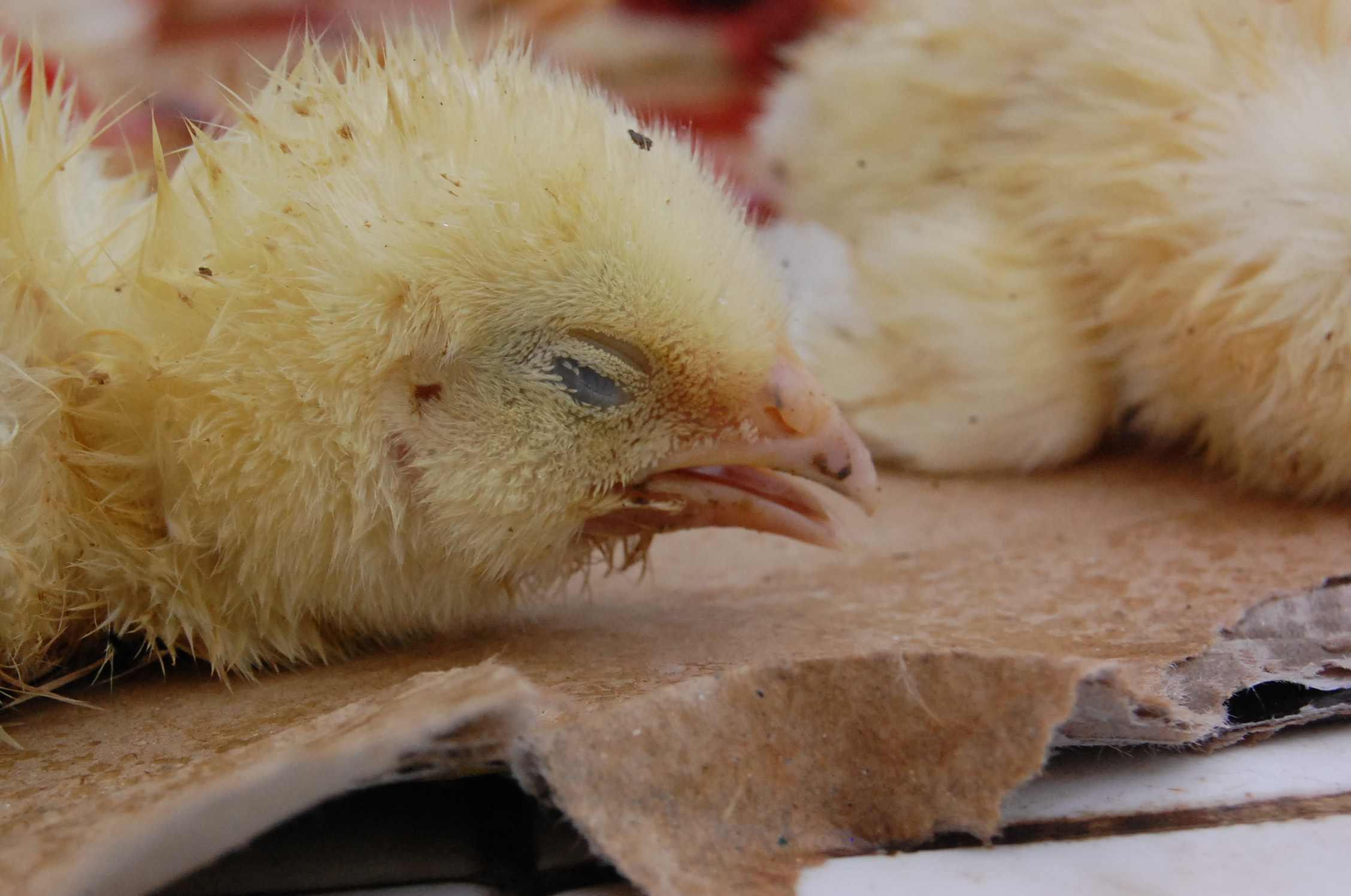
8 day old chick with difficulty breathing, due to an Avian influenza infection.

- Avian infectious bronchitis, caused by a strain of Avian coronavirus previously known as infectious bronchitis virus
- Avian infectious laryngotracheitis, caused by Gallid alphaherpesvirus 1
- Avian influenza, caused by Avian influenza virus
- Duck plague, caused by Anatid alphaherpesvirus 1
- Chicken infectious anemia, caused by Chicken anaemia virus
- Epidemic tremor, caused by Tremovirus
- Fowlpox, caused by viruses in the genus Avipoxvirus
- Infectious bursal disease (IBD), also known Gumboro disease, caused by Infectious bursal disease virus
- Lymphoid leukosis caused by avian sarcoma leukosis virus
- Marek's disease
- Newcastle disease
- Viral arthritis, caused by Avian reovirus

== Parasitic diseases ==
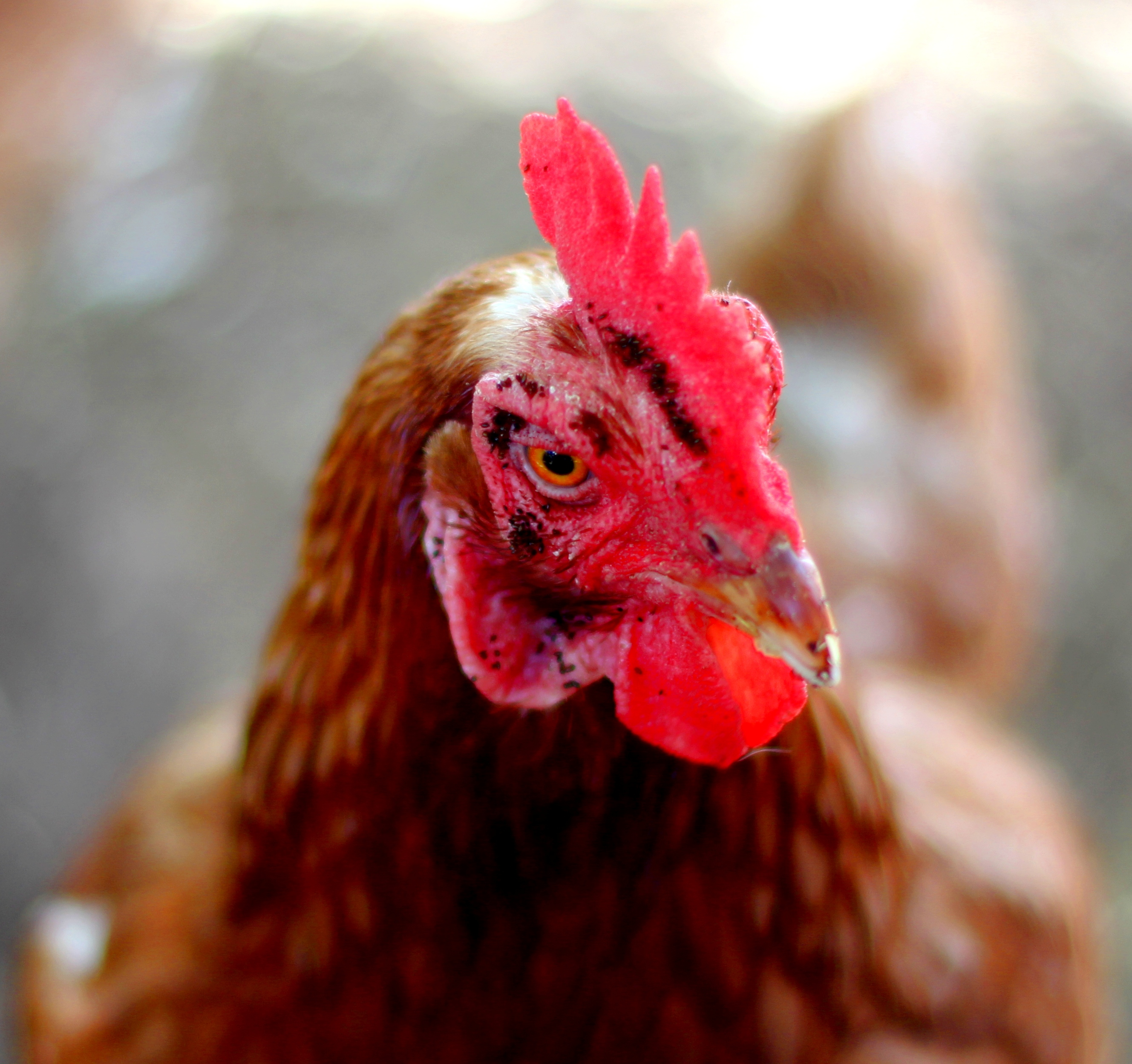
Infestation of Echidnophaga gillinacea fleas on the comb and around the eye of a chicken

- Scaly leg, caused by the mite Knemidocoptes mutans
- Infestation by Dermanyssus gallinae, the red poultry mite
- Infestation by Echidnophaga gallinacea, the sticktight flea

== Bacterial diseases ==
- Colibacillosis in poultry
- Infectious coryza in chickens
- Ornithobacterium rhinotracheale
- Pullorum disease
- Riemerella anatipestifer
- Salmonellosis in poultry
- Staphylococcal infection in poultry
- Streptococcal infection in poultry
- Omphalitis in chicks (mushy chick disease)
- Mycoplasmosis
- Fowl cholera
- Campylobacteriosis
- Pseudomonas
- Ornithobacteriosis

== Protozoal diseases ==
- Histomoniasis (blackhead disease), caused by Histomonas meleagridis
- Coccidiosis
- Trichomonas gallinae

== Fungal diseases ==
- Ergotism, which occurs when poultry feed is contaminated with toxic alkaloids produced by fungi of the genus Claviceps
- Aspergillosis, a non-contagious disease caused when birds inhale Aspergillus spores that cause breathing to be hard for the bird
- Ringworm
