= Pox =

Pox may refer to:

== Infections ==
- Poxviridae, a family of viruses
- Buffalopox, a disease of buffaloes
- Camelpox, a disease of camels
- Canarypox, a disease of wild and captive birds
- Chickenpox, a highly contagious illness caused by a primary infection with varicella zoster virus (VZV)
- Cowpox, a rodent disease that can infect cattle, and is also transmissible to humans; used for vaccination against smallpox
- Dogpox, an infection of canines
- Farmyard pox, an infectious skin disease
- Fowlpox, an infectious disease of poultry
- Goatpox, an infectious disease of goats
- Horsepox, an infectious disease of horses
- Mpox, formerly monkey pox, an infectious rodent disease that can infect primates
- Mousepox, an iatrogenic infectious disease of laboratory mice
- Myxomatosis, "wild rabbitpox", an infectious disease of wild rabbits
- Pigeonpox, an infectious disease of pigeons
- Plumpox, the most devastating viral disease of stone fruit from the genus “Prunus”
- Quokkapox a disease caused by the Quokkapox virus, also called marsupialpox
- Rabbitpox, an iatrogenic infectious disease of laboratory rabbits
- Rickettsialpox, a rickettsial disease spread by mites
- Sealpox, a skin condition caused by a parapoxvirus
- Sheeppox, an infectious disease of sheep
- Smallpox, an eradicated infectious disease unique to humans, caused by either of two virus variants, Variola major and Variola minor
  - Hemorrhagic smallpox, Blackpox a severe manifestation of smallpox caused by bleeding under the skin
- Squirrelpox, an infectious disease of squirrel
- Swinepox, an infectious disease of swine
- Syphilis, also known as grande verole, the “great pox”, a sexually transmitted disease caused by the spirochetal bacteria Treponema pallidum
- Turkeypox, a disease of turkeys
- Whitepox disease, a coral disease

== Arts, entertainment, and media ==
=== Games ===
- P-O-X, a 2001 handheld electronic game
- Pox: Save the People, a 2010 board game and mobile game
- PoxNora, a 2006 multiplayer online game that combines a collectible card game with a turn-based strategy game in a fantasy setting

=== Other uses in arts, entertainment, and media ===
- Orthopox 13, a character in the video game series Destroy All Humans!
- The P.O.X., a German band
- House of X and Powers of X (HOX/POX)
- "Pox", a song by Xiu Xiu from La Forêt

== Food and drink ==
- Pox (drink), a ceremonial drink common among the Maya, especially those in Chamula
- Candy Buttons, also called "pox", small rounded pegs of candy that are attached to a strip of paper
- Premature oxidation of wine

== Other uses ==
- Istiblennius pox, a kind of fish found in the Indian Ocean
- Plain Old XML, basic XML, a computer data representation format
- Partial oxidation, or POX, a chemical reaction
- Pontoise – Cormeilles Aerodrome, an airport in France with IATA code POX
- President's Overseas XV, a 1971 squad of the English Rugby Football Union

== See also ==
- Plague (disambiguation), another general term for disease
- Pock (disambiguation)
