= Canarypox =

Canarypox virus

Virus classification
- (unranked): Virus
- Realm: Varidnaviria
- Kingdom: Bamfordvirae
- Phylum: Nucleocytoviricota
- Class: Pokkesviricetes
- Order: Chitovirales
- Family: Poxviridae
- Genus: Avipoxvirus
- Species: Avipoxvirus canarypox

Viral disease of birds

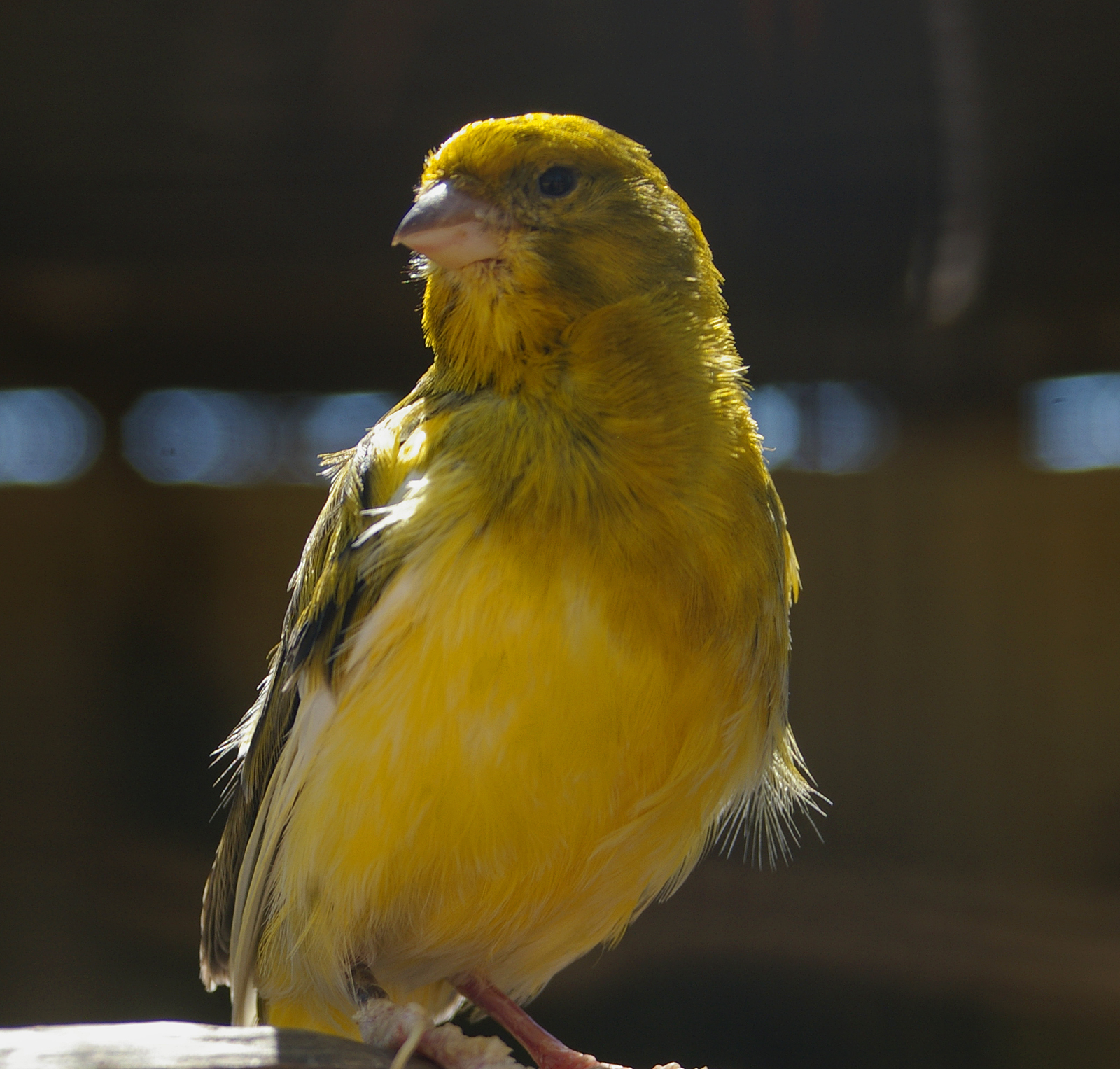
Canary bird (Serinus canaria) with its typical yellow colouration.

Canarypox virus (CNPV) is an Avipoxvirus and etiologic agent of canarypox, a disease of wild and captive birds that can cause significant losses. Canarypox can enter human cells, but it cannot survive and multiply in human cells. There is a live viral vaccine available which may have beneficial properties against human cancer when used as a mammalian expression vector. (ATCvet code: QI01KD01 (WHO)). Furthermore, the Poximune C vaccine does offer direct protection against CNPV in susceptible birds.

Generally CNPV is considered a disease of songbirds, such as canaries, magpies and nightingales, and is associated with higher mortality rates when compared to other avian pox viruses. In some instances, mortality approaches 100%. Avian pox viruses also cause significant economic losses in domestic poultry and remain a problem in the conservation of endemic bird species inhabiting islands.

The general symptoms of CNPV are similar to those of other species of avian pox viruses and are characterised by pustules and diphtheria or pneumonia-like symptoms.

== Classification ==
Canarypox virus (CNPV) is a member of the Poxviridae family. Canarypox viruses, as with other bird pox viruses, are in the genera of Avipoxvirus. Nine other species are also in the genus Avipoxvirus. These include: Fowlpox virus, Juncopox virus, Mynahpox virus, Psittacinepox virus, Sparrowpox virus, Starlingpox virus, Pigeonpox virus, Turkeypox virus and Quailpox virus.

It has thus far been reported that around 232 bird species (from 23 disparate orders) are affected by avian pox virus.

== Structure and replication ==
CNPV is an enveloped virus. They can be enveloped by double (external enveloped virion- EEV) or single (intracellular mature virion – IMV) membranes. These membranes are acquired from the host cell's endoplasmic reticulum (ER) or cell membrane. CNPV and other poxviruses are characterised by having exceptionally large physical dimensions, approximately 330 nm×280 nm×200 nm.

The genome of CNPV is linear and is composed of dsDNA. The genome size is approximately 365kbp, and in total, 328 genes have been found. The shape of all poxviruses resembles something of a 'rounded brick' and remains determined by the specific envelope around the virus.

The process which further characterises the poxvirus family is that replication occurs in the cytoplasm and utilises a specific virus-made structure for replication, the 'virosome'.

Furthermore, gene expression is divided into three phases: early, intermediate and late. At each stage specific genes and promoters are expressed. The structure and replication of CNPV also characterise other members of the Poxviridae family.

== Transmission ==
The most common form of spread of CNPV is by vectors such as mosquitoes and mites. These transmit the virus from infected birds to non-infected birds. Direct routes of transmission have also been observed, especially in closed environments such as aviaries or farms, where the contact rate of birds is high.

When the virus is transmitted directly, this would usually occur through aerosols, consumption of infected bird tissue or by general contact with the diseased bird. Healthy birds are at increased risk of acquiring the disease through existing wounds or scabs when in close contact with diseased birds.

The typical incubation period for the virus is between 5–10 days.

== Symptoms ==
CNPV symptoms often show two main forms. That is either dry (cutaneous) and/or wet (diphtheritic) symptoms (both forms can occur at the same time).

The dry form is the most frequently observed. At the beginning of the disease, small white/yellow blisters form on the uncovered parts of the skin. As the disease progresses blisters get progressively larger and form nodules where the virus can multiply. When the nodules coalesce and burst, scabs are formed leaving rough, dry and pigmented areas on the skin where the nodules were.

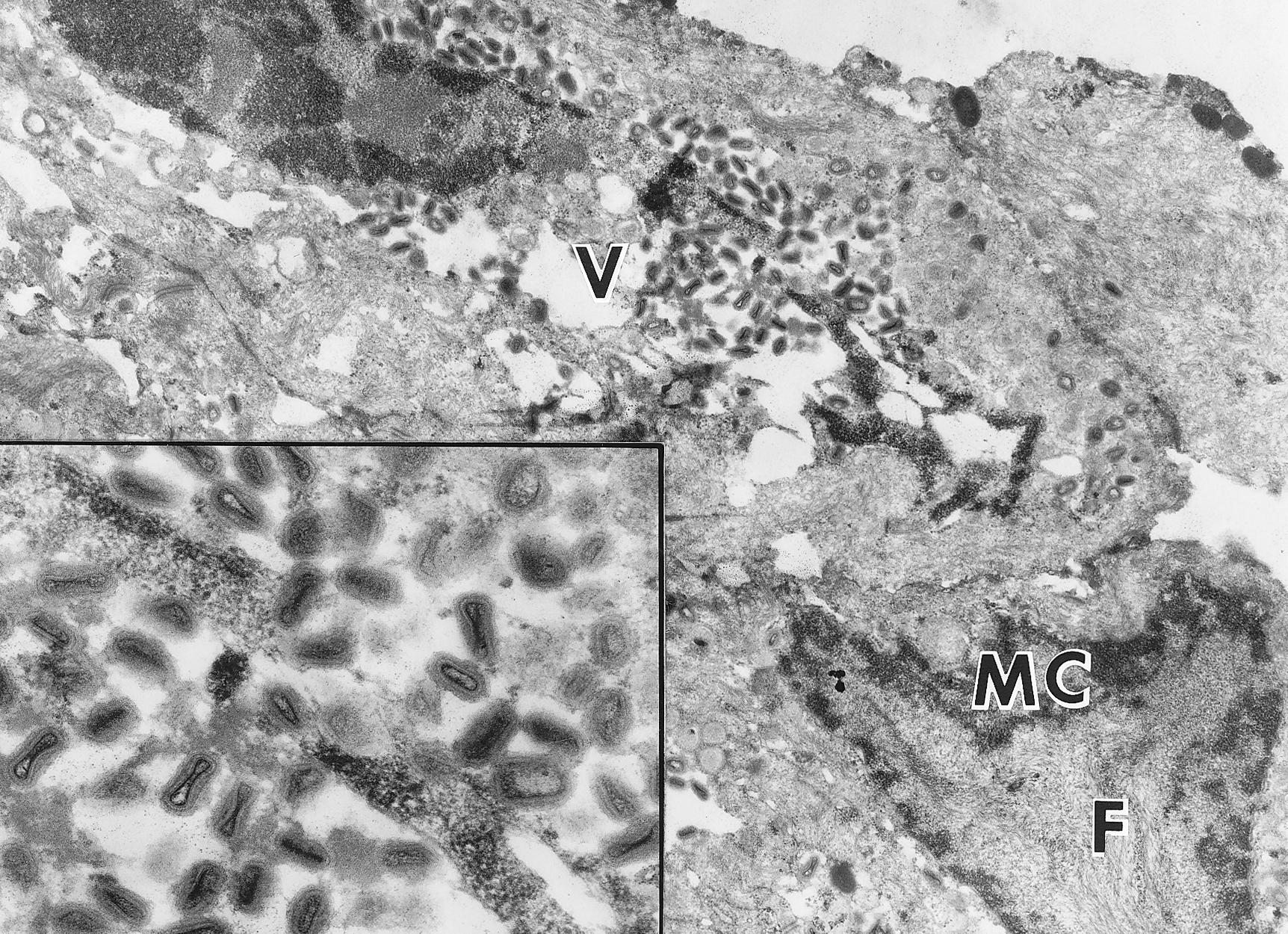
Electron micrograph of an epidermal cell showing Poxvirus infection

This form of the disease is usually mild and does not cause death. The chances of mortality increase when the dry form occurs together with the wet (diphtheritic) form. The wet form symptoms include an enlarged thymus and obstructed lungs, sinuses and trachea with white areas of necrotic tissue. This results in restricted air intake and the potential for suffocation. It has also been observed that some birds may also experience thickened eyelids, air-sacks and enlarged spleens.

Observations under the microscope have shown that the lesions are characterised by epithelial proliferation and hypertrophy in the viral infected areas. Characteristics of avian pox include the formation of intracytoplasmic inclusion bodies ('Bollinger bodies') which are composed of mononuclear inflammatory cells and have been detected in the thymus, spleen, bone marrow, middle ear and air sac. Similar inclusion bodies which are associated with inflammation have also been seen in the epidermis, feather follicles, sinuses and oral mucosa lining.

Apart from the symptoms mentioned above, more general signs of infection include weight loss, loss of feathers and scaly skin on the head, neck and back. Secondary bacterial infections are common with both forms of the disease, having the potential to cause pneumonia or other bacterial infections at the sites of blistering.

== Treatment ==
Currently there is no treatment available.

Diseased birds should however be admitted to a veterinary practice where suitable care will be provided. Care would normally consist of removing skin from the lesions and washing the infected area(s) with Lugol's iodine solution. Furthermore, swabbing of the mouth and throat areas to remove necrotic tissues is common.

By keeping diseased birds in warmer temperatures and ensuring daily eye rinsing with 1-2% saline solution has also been shown to promote recovery. In some cases, the infected birds are prescribed antibiotics. This will not target the virus but its use is designed to prevent secondary bacterial and fungal infections which are often found in skin lesions.

== Medical ==
=== Avian prevention ===
A live attenuated CNPV vaccine has been developed and is the best preventive measure against canarypox for captive grown canary birds and other passerine birds. The brand name 'Poximune® C' by Ceva is a freeze-dried vaccine, administered by the 'wing web' method to healthy, susceptible passerine birds who have reached at least four weeks of age. Booster vaccination is recommended every 6–12 months if the risk of disease remains high. Pox lesion formation around the vaccination area is indicative that the vaccine has been effective. The vaccine should not be administered during egg production or in the 4 weeks prior to this.

In a Hawaiian study Poximune® provided treatment in some birds, with their symptoms lasting only a few weeks, others developed necrosis and some died or had symptoms for two months, and some birds needed another vaccine as the first vaccine did not work. Therefore, a range of symptoms can be observed in a clinical setting, while giving unambiguous results.

=== Mammalian medicine ===
CNPV has been used recently as a mammalian expression vector in the vaccine industry. The expression system using CNPV is advantageous because it undergoes what is known as ‘abortive infection’ but at the same time displays the necessary antigens to the hosts immune system.

Although veterinary CNPV recombinant vaccines exist, recent attention has focussed on its use in human medicine with several human vaccines using this expression system undergoing clinical trials. The vaccines typically use the CNPV ALVAC strain, which is highly attenuated. The use of this strain has been involved in the expression of several key pathogen and tumour associated antigens. These include (but are not limited to) those found in rabies virus, hepatitis B and hepatitis C, leukaemia virus, HIV and cancers; such as melanoma and colorectal cancers.

A strain of canarypox virus modified to carry feline interleukin-2 called vCP1338 is used to treat cats with fibrosarcoma.

More information can be found in a review by Weli et al, 2011.

== Threats ==
Canarypox virus remains a constant threat to wild birds. Those most vulnerable are passerine birds, endemic on islands such as Hawaii and the Galapagos. Here they have experienced dramatic losses in bird numbers. Many more have become classified as endangered species due to CNPV. The disease is mainly spread by mosquitoes and mites in these regions, which were introduced during European colonisation. Canarypox, together with avian malaria, are the most devastating diseases for birds on the island of Hawaii and surrounding regions.
