= ATCvet code QI01 =

Veterinary medical products classification subgroup

ATCvet code QI01 Immunologicals for Aves is a therapeutic subgroup of the Anatomical Therapeutic Chemical Classification System for veterinary medicinal products, a system of alphanumeric codes developed by the World Health Organization (WHO) for the classification of drugs and other medical products for veterinary use. Subgroup QI01 is part of the anatomical group QI Immunologicals.

National versions of the ATC classification may include additional codes not present in this list, which follows the WHO version.

== QI01A Domestic fowl ==
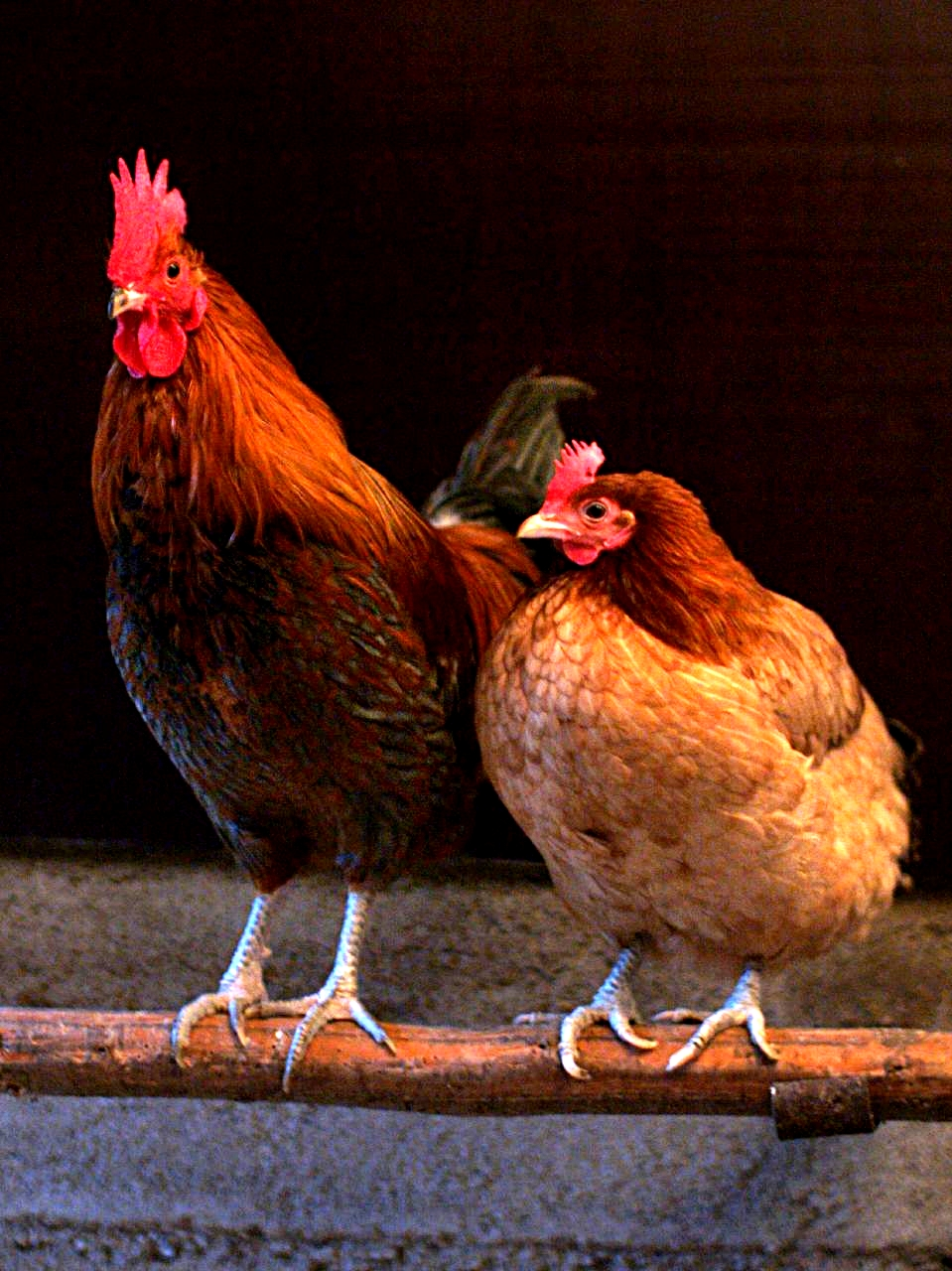

=== QI01AA Inactivated viral vaccines ===
QI01AA01 Avian infectious bursal (gumboro) disease virus
QI01AA02 Newcastle disease virus/paramyxovirus
QI01AA03 Avian infectious bronchitis virus
QI01AA04 Avian reovirus
QI01AA05 Avian adenovirus
QI01AA06 Avian infectious bronchitis virus + avian infectious bursal (gumboro) disease virus + newcastle disease virus/paramyxovirus + avian rhinotracheitis virus
QI01AA07 Avian infectious bronchitis virus + avian infectious bursal (gumboro) disease virus + newcastle disease virus/paramyxovirus + avian rhinotracheitis virus + avian adenovirus
QI01AA08 Avian infectious bronchitis virus + avian infectious bursal (gumboro) disease virus + newcastle disease virus/paramyxovirus
QI01AA09 Newcastle disease virus/paramyxovirus + avian infectious bursal (gumboro) disease virus + avian adenovirus
QI01AA10 Avian infectious bronchitis virus + newcastle disease virus/paramyxovirus
QI01AA11 Avian infectious bursal (gumboro) disease virus + newcastle disease virus/paramyxovirus
QI01AA12 Newcastle disease virus/paramyxovirus + avian adenovirus + avian adenovirus
QI01AA13 Newcastle disease virus/paramyxovirus + avian infectious bronchitis virus + avian adenovirus
QI01AA14 Avian infectious bronchitis virus + avian adenovirus
QI01AA15 Avian infectious bronchitis virus + avian infectious bursal (gumboro) disease virus
QI01AA16 Avian infectious bronchitis virus + avian infectious bursal (gumboro) disease virus + newcastle disease virus/paramyxovirus + avian reovirus
QI01AA17 Avian rhinotracheitis virus
QI01AA18 Avian infectious bronchitis virus + newcastle disease virus/paramyxovirus + avian adenovirus + avian rhinotracheitis virus
QI01AA19 Avian infectious bronchitis virus + avian infectious bursal (gumboro) disease virus + newcastle disease virus/paramyxovirus + avian adenovirus
QI01AA20 Newcastle disease virus/paramyxovirus + avian rhinotracheitis virus
QI01AA21 Avian infectious bronchitis virus + newcastle disease virus/paramyxovirus + avian rhinotracheitis virus
QI01AA22 Avian infectious bursal (gumboro) disease virus + avian reovirus
QI01AA23 Avian influenza virus
QI01AA24 Avian infectious bronchitis virus + avian infectious bursal (gumboro) disease virus + newcastle disease virus / paramyxovirus + avian reovirus + avian adenovirus + avian rhinotracheitis virus
QI01AA25 Avian infectious bronchitis virus + avian infectious bursal (gumboro) disease virus + newcastle disease virus / paramyxovirus + avian reovirus + avian adenovirus
QI01AA26 Avian infectious bronchitis virus + avian infectious bursal (gumboro) disease virus + newcastle disease virus / paramyxovirus + avian reovirus + avian rhinotracheitis virus

=== QI01AB Inactivated bacterial vaccines (including mycoplasma, toxoid and chlamydia) ===
QI01AB01 Salmonella
QI01AB02 Pasteurella
QI01AB03 Mycoplasma
QI01AB04 Haemophilus
QI01AB05 Escherichia
QI01AB06 Erysipelothrix
QI01AB07 Ornithobacterium
QI01AB08 Clostridium

=== QI01AC Inactivated bacterial vaccines and antisera ===
Empty group

=== QI01AD Live viral vaccines ===
QI01AD01 Avian rhinotracheitis virus
QI01AD02 Avian encephalomyelitis virus
QI01AD03 Avian herpes virus (Marek's disease)
QI01AD04 Chicken anaemia
QI01AD05 Avian adenovirus
QI01AD06 Newcastle disease virus/paramyxovirus
QI01AD07 Avian infectious bronchitis virus
QI01AD08 Avian infectious laryngotracheitis virus
QI01AD09 Avian infectious bursal (gumboro) disease virus
QI01AD10 Avian reovirus
QI01AD11 Avian infectious bursal (gumboro) disease virus + newcastle disease virus/paramyxovirus
QI01AD12 Avian pox virus
QI01AD13 Avian leucosis virus
QI01AD14 Avian reticuloendotheliosis
QI01AD15 Avian infectious bursal (gumboro) disease virus + avian herpes virus (Marek's disease)
QI01AD16 Avian herpes virus (Marek's disease) + avian infectious bursal disease virus (gumboro disease) + newcastle disease virus/paramyxovirus
QI01AD17 Avian herpes virus (Marek's disease) + avian infectious laryngotracheitis virus + newcastle disease virus/paramyxovirus
QI01AD18 Avian herpes virus (Marek's disease) + avian infectious laryngotracheitis virus + avian infectious bursal disease virus (gumboro) disease
QI01AD19 Avian herpes virus (Marek's disease) + avian infectious laryngotracheitis virus
QI01AD20 Avian herpes virus (marek's disease) + avian infectious laryngotracheitis virus + avian infectious bursal disease virus (gumboro) disease + newcastle disease virus/paramyxovirus

=== QI01AE Live bacterial vaccines ===
QI01AE01 Salmonella
QI01AE02 Pasteurella
QI01AE03 Mycoplasma
QI01AE04 Escherichia
QI01AE05 Erysipelothrix

=== QI01AF Live bacterial and viral vaccines ===
Empty group

=== QI01AG Live and inactivated bacterial vaccines ===
Empty group

=== QI01AH Live and inactivated viral vaccines ===
Empty group

=== QI01AI Live viral and inactivated bacterial vaccines ===
Empty group

=== QI01AJ Live and inactivated viral and bacterial vacciness ===
Empty group

=== QI01AK Inactivated viral and live bacterial vaccines ===
Empty group

=== QI01AL Inactivated viral and inactivated bacterial vaccines ===
QI01AL01 Newcastle disease virus/paramyxovirus + escherichia + pasteurella
QI01AL02 Newcastle disease virus/paramyxovirus + avian infectious bronchitis virus + haemophilus
QI01AL03 Newcastle disease virus/paramyxovirus + haemophilus
QI01AL04 Newcastle disease virus/paramyxovirus + pasteurella
QI01AL05 Newcastle disease virus/paramyxovirus + avian infectious bronchitis virus + avian adenovirus + haemophilus
QI01AL06 Newcastle disease virus/paramyxovirus + avian infectious bronchitis virus + escherichia + pasteurella
QI01AL07 Newcastle disease virus/paramyxovirus + salmonella + pasteurella

=== QI01AM Antisera, immunoglobulin preparations, and antitoxins ===
Empty group

=== QI01AN Live parasitic vaccines ===
QI01AN01 Coccidia

=== QI01AO Inactivated parasitic ===
QI01AO01 Coccidia

=== QI01AP Live fungal vaccines ===
Empty group

=== QI01AQ Inactivated fungal vaccines ===
Empty group

=== QI01AR In vivo diagnostic preparations ===
Empty group

=== QI01AS Allergens ===
Empty group

=== QI01AU Other live vaccines ===
Empty group

=== QI01AV Other inactivated vaccines ===
Empty group

=== QI01AX Other immunologicals ===
Empty group

== QI01B Duck ==
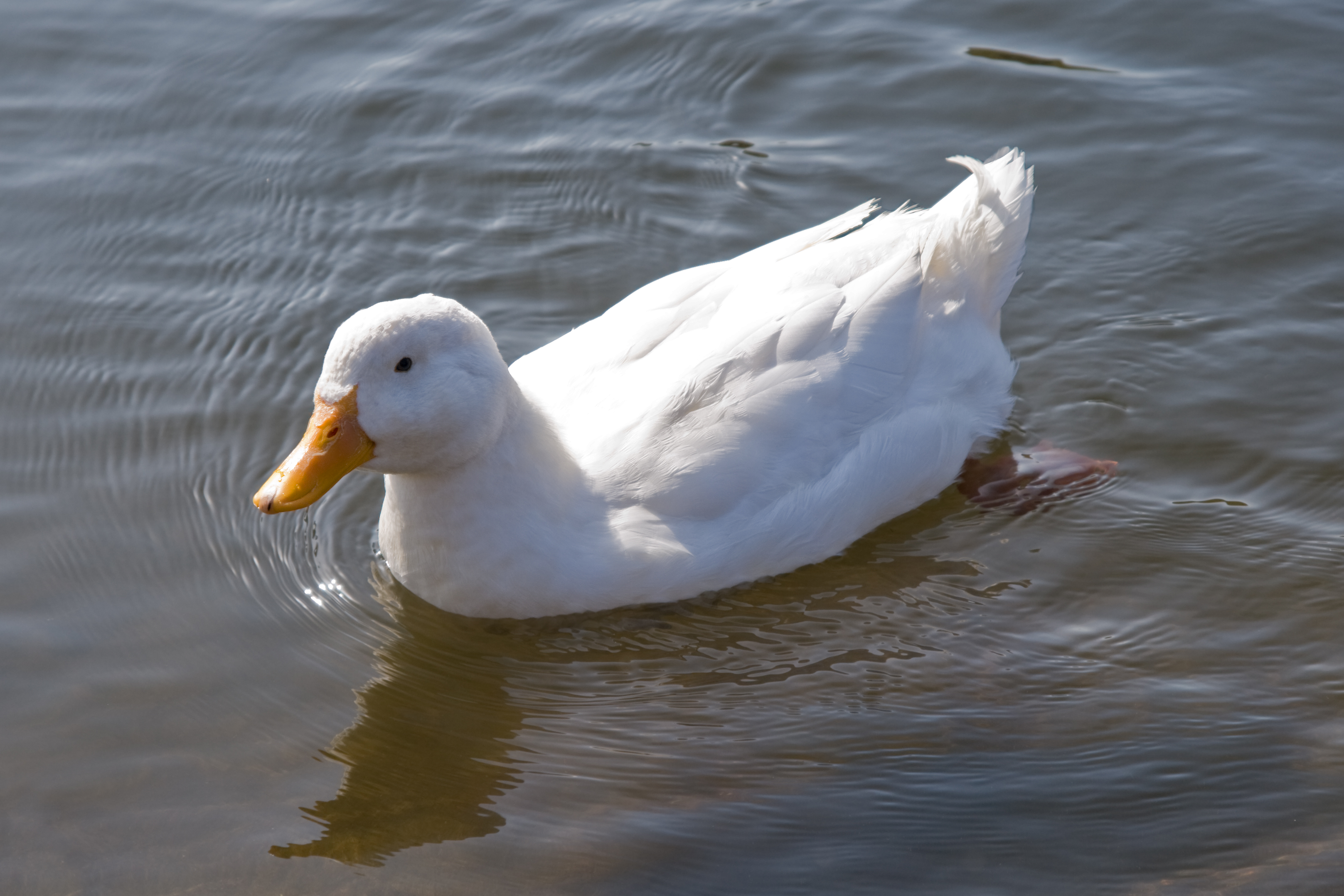

=== QI01BA Inactivated viral vaccines ===
QI01BA01 Duck parvovirus + goose parvovirus

=== QI01BB Inactivated bacterial vaccines (including mycoplasma, toxoid and chlamydia) ===
QI01BB01 Clostridium

=== QI01BC Inactivated bacterial vaccines and antisera ===
Empty group

=== QI01BD Live viral vaccines ===
QI01BD01 Duck enteritis virus
QI01BD02 Duck hepatitis virus
QI01BD03 Duck parvovirus

=== QI01BE Live bacterial vaccines ===
Empty group

=== QI01BF Live bacterial and viral vaccines ===
Empty group

=== QI01BG Live and inactivated bacterial vaccines ===
Empty group

=== QI01BH Live and inactivated viral vaccines ===
QI01BH01 Live goose parvovirus + inactivated duck parvovirus

=== QI01BI Live viral and inactivated bacterial vaccines ===
Empty group

=== QI01BJ Live and inactivated viral and bacterial vaccines ===
Empty group

=== QI01BK Inactivated viral and live bacterial vaccines ===
Empty group

=== QI01BL Inactivated viral and inactivated bacterial vaccines ===
Empty group

=== QI01BM Antisera, immunoglobulin preparations, and antitoxins ===
Empty group

=== QI01BN Live parasitic vaccines ===
Empty group

=== QI01BO Inactivated parasitic vaccines ===
Empty group

=== QI01BP Live fungal vaccines ===
Empty group

=== QI01BQ Inactivated fungal vaccines ===
Empty group

=== QI01BR In vivo diagnostic preparations ===
Empty group

=== QI01BS Allergens ===
Empty group

=== QI01BU Other live vaccines ===
Empty group

=== QI01BV Other inactivated vaccines ===
Empty group

=== QI01BX Other immunologicals ===
Empty group

== QI01C Turkey ==
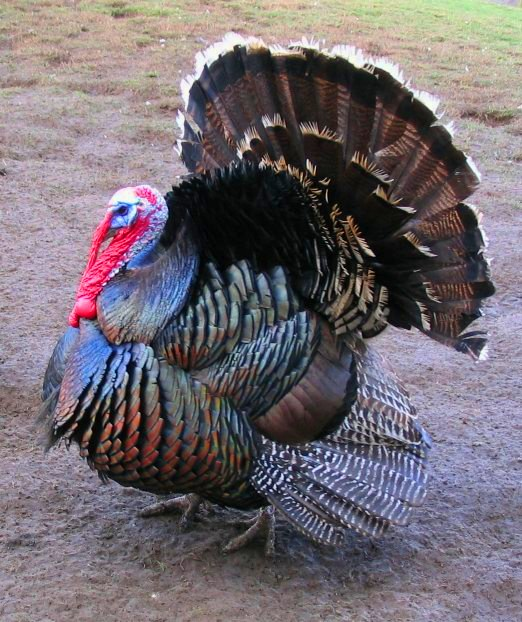

=== QI01CA Inactivated viral vaccines ===
QI01CA01 Turkey paramyxovirus
QI01CA02 Turkey paramyxovirus + turkey rhinotracheitis virus
QI01CA03 Newcastle disease virus/paramyxovirus + avian adenovirus

=== QI01CB Inactivated bacterial vaccines (including mycoplasma, toxoid and chlamydia) ===
QI01CB01 Pasteurella + erysipelothrix
QI01CB02 Erysipelothrix

=== QI01CC Inactivated bacterial vaccines and antisera ===
Empty group

=== QI01CD Live viral vaccines ===
QI01CD01 Turkey rhinotracheitis virus
QI01CD02 Turkey herpes virus

=== QI01CE Live bacterial vaccines ===
Empty group

=== QI01CF Live bacterial and viral vaccines ===
Empty group

=== QI01CG Live and inactivated bacterial vaccines ===
Empty group

=== QI01CH Live and inactivated viral vaccines ===
Empty group

=== QI01CI Live viral and inactivated bacterial vaccines ===
Empty group

=== QI01CJ Live and inactivated viral and bacterial vaccines ===
Empty group

=== QI01CK Inactivated viral and live bacterial vaccines ===
Empty group

=== QI01CL Inactivated viral and inactivated bacterial vaccines ===
QI01CL01 Newcastle disease virus/paramyxovirus + avian adenovirus + avian influenza virus + pasteurella

=== QI01CM Antisera, immunoglobulin preparations, and antitoxins ===
Empty group

=== QI01CN Live parasitic vaccines ===
Empty group

=== QI01CO Inactivated parasitic vaccines ===
Empty group

=== QI01CP Live fungal vaccines ===
Empty group

=== QI01CQ Inactivated fungal vaccines ===
Empty group

=== QI01CR In vivo diagnostic preparations ===
Empty group

=== QI01CS Allergens ===
Empty group

=== QI01CU Other live vaccines ===
Empty group

=== QI01CV Other inactivated vaccines ===
Empty group

=== QI01CX Other immunologicals ===
Empty group

== QI01D Goose ==
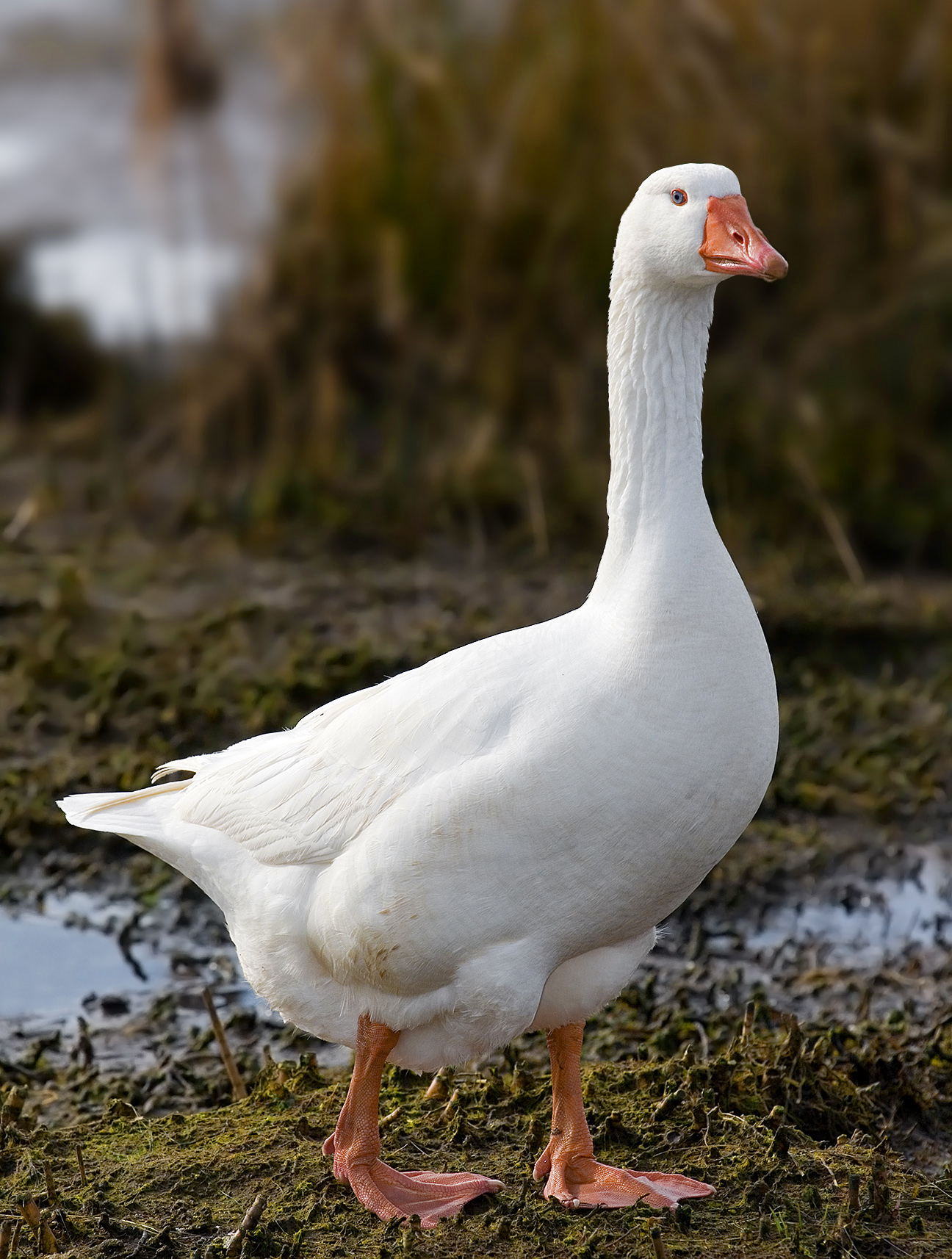

=== QI01DA Inactivated viral vaccines ===
Empty group

=== QI01DB Inactivated bacterial vaccines (including mycoplasma, toxoid and chlamydia) ===
Empty group

=== QI01DC Inactivated bacterial vaccines and antisera ===
Empty group

=== QI01DD Live viral vaccines ===
QI01DD01 Goose parvovirus

=== QI01DE Live bacterial vaccines ===
Empty group

=== QI01DF Live bacterial and viral vaccines ===
Empty group

=== QI01DG Live and inactivated bacterial vaccines ===
Empty group

=== QI01DH Live and inactivated viral vaccines ===
Empty group

=== QI01DI Live viral and inactivated bacterial vaccines ===
Empty group

=== QI01DJ Live and inactivated viral and bacterial vaccines ===
Empty group

=== QI01DK Inactivated viral and live bacterial vaccines ===
Empty group

=== QI01DL Inactivated viral and inactivated bacterial vaccines ===
Empty group

=== QI01DM Antisera, immunoglobulin preparations, and antitoxins ===
QI01DM01 Goose parvovirus antiserum

=== QI01DN Live parasitic vaccines ===
Empty group

=== QI01DO Inactivated parasitic vaccines ===
Empty group

=== QI01DP Live fungal vaccines ===
Empty group

=== QI01DQ Inactivated fungal vaccines ===
Empty group

=== QI01DR In vivo diagnostic preparations ===
Empty group

=== QI01DS Allergens ===
Empty group

=== QI01DU Other live vaccines ===
Empty group

=== QI01DV Other inactivated vaccines ===
Empty group

=== QI01DX Other immunologicals ===
Empty group

== QI01E Pigeon ==
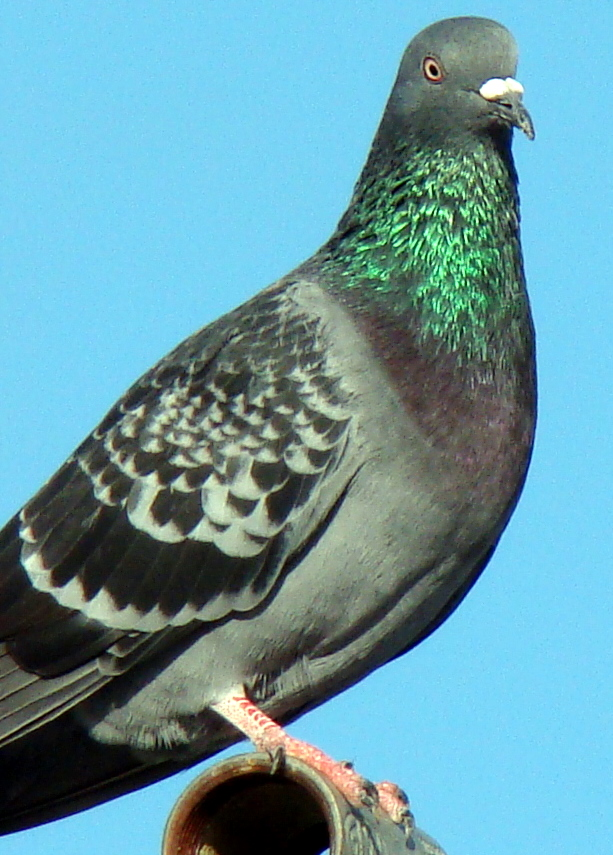

=== QI01EA Inactivated viral vaccines ===
QI01EA01 Pigeon paramyxovirus

=== QI01EB Inactivated bacterial vaccines (including mycoplasma, toxoid and chlamydia) ===
Empty group

=== QI01EC Inactivated bacterial vaccines and antisera ===
Empty group

=== QI01ED Live viral vaccines ===
QI01ED01 Pigeon pox virus

=== QI01EE Live bacterial vaccines ===
QI01EE01 Salmonella

=== QI01EF Live bacterial and viral vaccines ===
Empty group

=== QI01EG Live and inactivated bacterial vaccines ===
Empty group

=== QI01EH Live and inactivated viral vaccines ===
QI01EH01 Live pigeon pox virus + inactivated pigeon paramyxovirus

=== QI01EI Live viral and inactivated bacterial vaccines ===
Empty group

=== QI01EJ Live and inactivated viral and bacterial vaccines ===
Empty group

=== QI01EK Inactivated viral and live bacterial vaccines ===
Empty group

=== QI01EL Inactivated viral and inactivated bacterial vaccines ===
Empty group

=== QI01EM Antisera, immunoglobulin preparations, and antitoxins ===
Empty group

=== QI01EN Live parasitic vaccines ===
Empty group

=== QI01EO Inactivated parasitic vaccines ===
Empty group

=== QI01EP Live fungal vaccines ===
Empty group

=== QI01EQ Inactivated fungal vaccines ===
Empty group

=== QI01ER In vivo diagnostic preparations ===
Empty group

=== QI01ES Allergens ===
Empty group

=== QI01EU Other live vaccines ===
Empty group

=== QI01EV Other inactivated vaccines ===
Empty group

=== QI01EX Other immunologicals ===
Empty group

== QI01F Pheasant ==
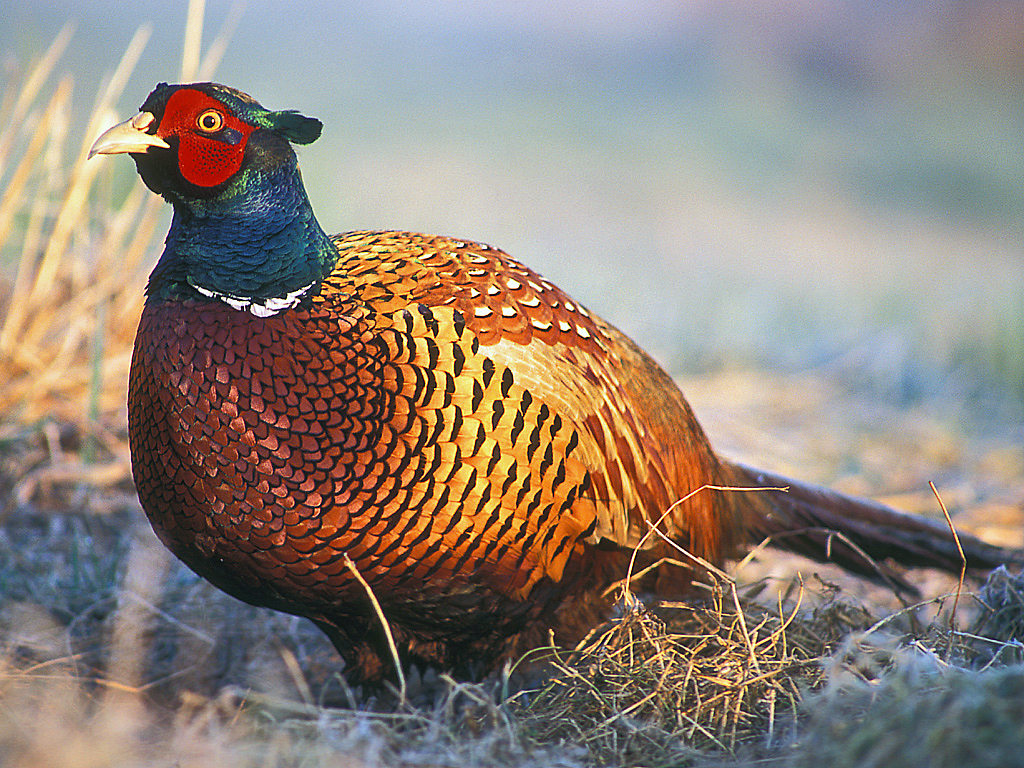

Empty group

== QI01G Quail ==
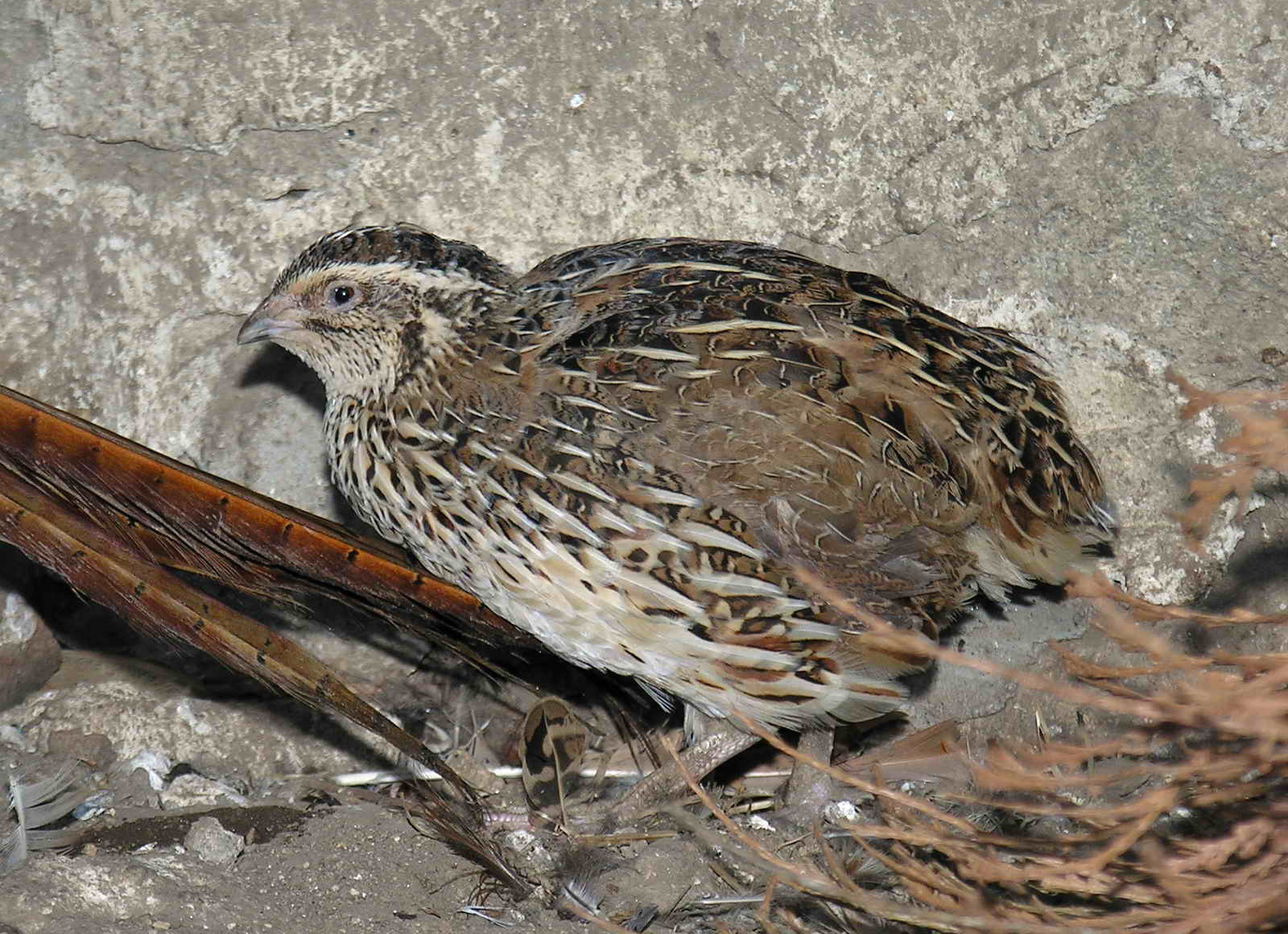

Empty group

== QI01H Partridge ==
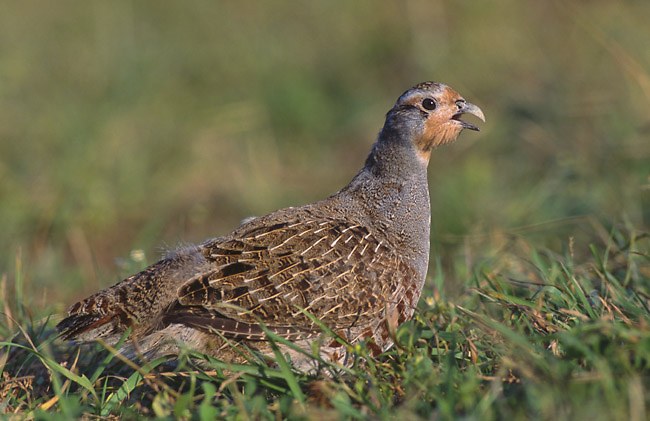

Empty group

== QI01I Ostrich ==
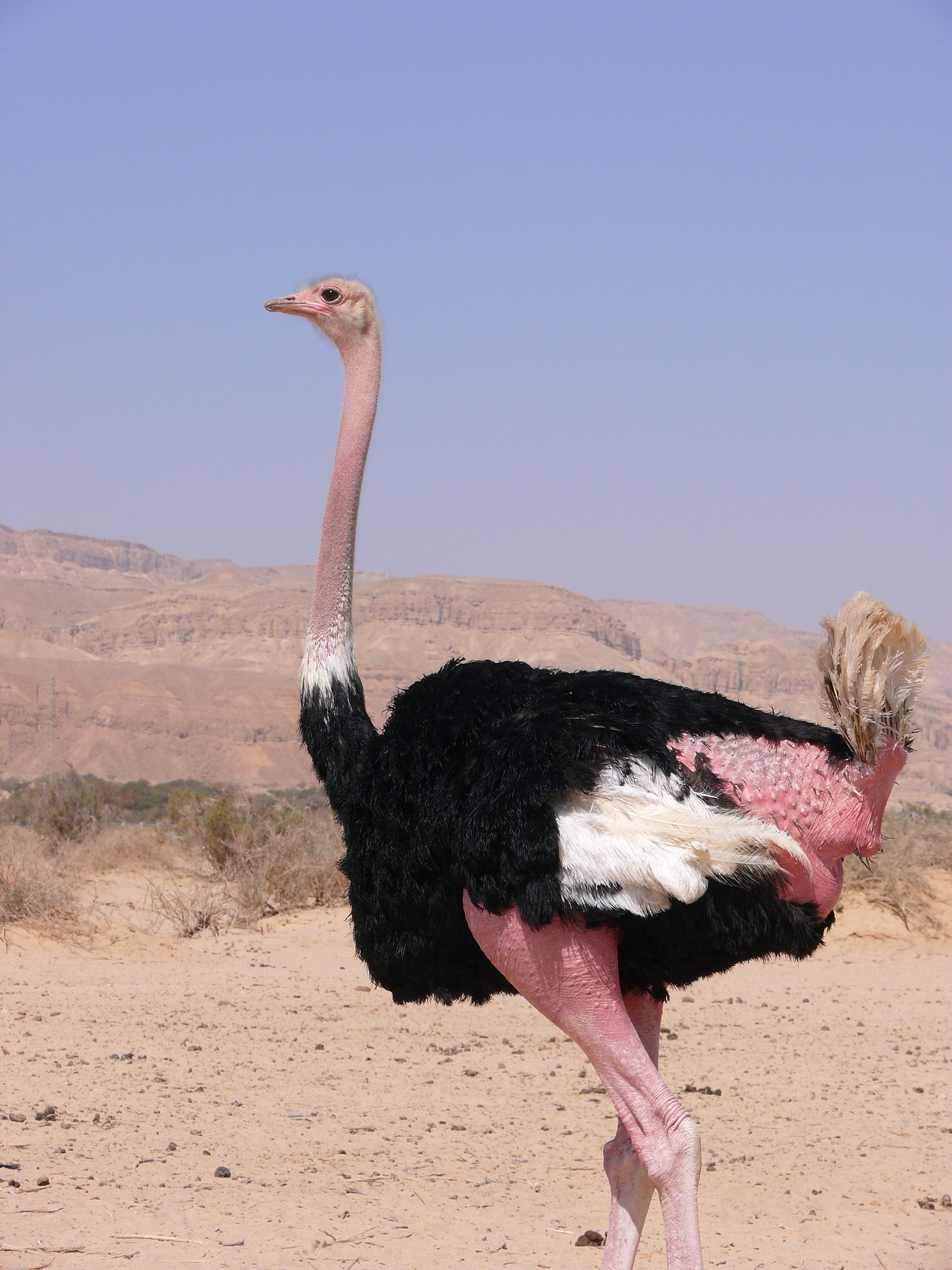

Empty group

== QI01K Pet birds ==
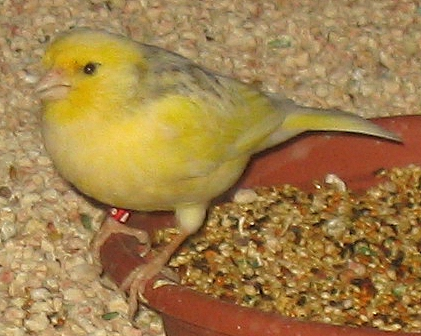

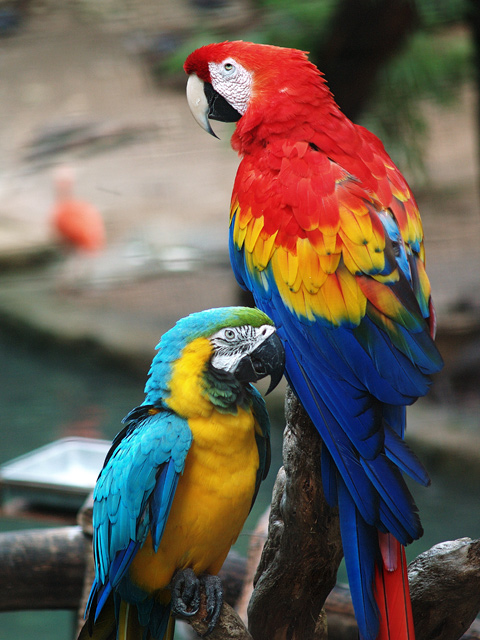

=== QI01KA Inactivated viral vaccines ===
QI01KA01 Pacheco's virus/herpesvirus

=== QI01KB Inactivated bacterial vaccines (including mycoplasma, toxoid and chlamydia) ===
Empty group

=== QI01KC Inactivated bacterial vaccines and antisera ===
Empty group

=== QI01KD Live viral vaccines ===
QI01KD01 Canary pox virus
QI01KD02 Pacheco's virus/herpesvirus

=== QI01KE Live bacterial vaccines ===
Empty group

=== QI01KF Live bacterial and viral vaccines ===
Empty group

=== QI01KG Live and inactivated bacterial vaccines ===
Empty group

=== QI01KH Live and inactivated viral vaccines ===
Empty group

=== QI01KI Live viral and inactivated bacterial vaccines ===
Empty group

=== QI01KJ Live and inactivated viral and bacterial vaccines ===
Empty group

=== QI01KK Inactivated viral and live bacterial vaccines ===
Empty group

=== QI01KL Inactivated viral and inactivated bacterial vaccines ===
Empty group

=== QI01KM Antisera, immunoglobulin preparations, and antitoxins ===
Empty group

=== QI01KN Live parasitic vaccines ===
Empty group

=== QI01KO Inactivated parasitic vaccines ===
Empty group

=== QI01KP Live fungal vaccines ===
Empty group

=== QI01KQ Inactivated fungal vaccines ===
Empty group

=== QI01KR In vivo diagnostic preparations ===
Empty group

=== QI01KS Allergens ===
Empty group

=== QI01KU Other live vaccines ===
Empty group

=== QI01KV Other inactivated vaccines ===
Empty group

=== QI01KX Other immunologicals ===
Empty group

== QI01X Aves, others ==
Empty group
