= Pok =

Pok or POK may refer to:

- Pakistan-occupied Kashmir, the name used by India for the portion of Kashmir under Pakistani administration
- Pantoate kinase or PoK, an enzyme
- P.O.K. (Podosfairikes Omades Kentrou), a former coalition of football teams of Athens
- Pok (genus), a Hungarian medieval clan
- Pok, a character in the Pok & Mok animated series
- Pok, a dialect of the Sabaot language of Kenya
- Pok, Malaysia, a settlement in Sarawak, Malaysia
- Pokesdown railway station's station code
- Polyketone, a type of thermoplastic polymer
- Pondok Jati railway station's code
- Prophecy of Kings, an expansion to the 2017 board game Twilight Imperium: Fourth Edition

== People with the surname ==
- Pok Shau-fu (1909–2000), Hong Kong journalist
- Pál Pók (1929–1982), Hungarian water polo player

== See also ==
- Poc (disambiguation)
- Pock
- Pokémon
