= POC =

POC most commonly refers to:

- Person of color or people of color
- Proof of concept, used to demonstrate the feasibility of an idea
- Point of contact, in an organization

POC, PoC, P.O.C. or POc may also refer to:

== Business ==
- Paid outside closing, money paid in real estate transactions not included in calculations
- Percentage-of-completion method, a work-in-progress evaluation
- Production office coordinator, in film and television production

== Medicine ==
- Point of care, designating a service or product given at a medical-services facility
- Portable oxygen concentrator, a medical oxygen source
- Products of conception, tissue resulting from the union of an egg and sperm

== Organizations and companies ==
- Philippine Olympic Committee, the National Olympic Committee of the Philippines
- Professional Officer Course, of the US Air Force Reserve Officer Training Corps program
- Provisional Organizing Committee to Reconstitute a Marxist-Leninist Communist Party in the United States, a splinter of the Communist Party USA

== Science and technology ==
- Particulate organic carbon, carbon particles too large to pass through a filter
- Power over Cable, often used in the media/AV field with HDBaseT devices
- Products of combustion, the chemicals formed by burning materials in oxygen
- Proof-of-capacity, an algorithm used to mine the Burstcoin digital cryptocurrency
- Proto-Oceanic language (POc), the protolanguage ancestral to the Oceanic languages
- Push to talk over cellular (PoC), a service to use a cellphone as walkie-talkie

== Other uses ==
- Atitlán grebe, an extinct water bird, also known as a poc
- Brackett Field, a public airport a mile (2 km) southwest of La Verne, California; IATA airport code POC
- Prisoner of conscience, anyone imprisoned because of their race, sexual orientation, religion, or political views
- Pakistan Origin Card, issued to persons of Pakistani origin
- Pondok Cina railway station, a railway station in Depok, Indonesia

== See also ==
- Pock, a surname
- Pok (disambiguation)
