= Haunted House (disambiguation) =

A haunted house is a building purported to be the site of paranormal activity. A haunted attraction, often called a "haunted house", is a venue that simulates the experience of paranormal activity for thrills or amusement.

Haunted house may also refer to:

== Films and television ==
- The Haunted House (1913 film), an American silent short comedy-drama
- The Haunted House (1917 film), an American film directed by Albert Parker
- The Haunted House (1921 film), a comedy short starring Buster Keaton
- The Haunted House, a 1922 American silent horror/comedy film directed by Erle C. Kenton
- The Haunted House (1928 film), starring Larry Kent and Thelma Todd
- The Haunted House (1929 film), a Mickey Mouse cartoon
- Haunted House, a 1940 film featuring Buddy Swan
- "The Haunted House" (The Andy Griffith Show), a 1963 episode of The Andy Griffith Show
- Haunted House, a 2004 American film edited by Alan Roberts
- Haunted House (2004 film), an animated short film
- The Haunted House (2005 film), a Khmer horror film
- A Haunted House, a 2013 American parody film
- Bhoot Bungla (lit. 'Haunted House'), a 1965 Indian horror film
- La casa stregata (transl. The Haunted House), a 1982 Italian film starring Gloria Guida
- The Haunted House (TV series) (신비아파트), a Tooniverse animated television series
- "Haunted House" (Penny Crayon), a 1989 television episode
- "Haunted House" (The Ren & Stimpy Show), a 1992 television episode
- "Haunted House" (Scream Queens), a 2015 television episode

== Games ==
- Haunted House (arcade game), a 1972 electro-mechanical arcade game
- Haunted House (pinball), a 1982 pinball machine
- Haunted House (video game), a 1982 video game for the Atari 2600
- Haunted House, a 2010 video game for the Wii
- Haunted House: Cryptic Graves, a 2014 video game for PC
- Haunted House, a text adventure game for the TRS-80
- Haunted House, a 1962 board game by Marvin Glass and Associates
- Which Witch? (board game) or Haunted House, a 1970 board game by Milton-Bradley

== Literature ==
- Haunted House (manga), a 2002 manga by Mitsukazu Mihara
- "The Haunted House" (story), an 1859 "portmanteau" story by Charles Dickens and others
- A Haunted House and Other Short Stories, a 1944 story collection by Virginia Woolf
- Mostellaria or The Haunted House, a play by Plautus
- Haunted House, a children's pop-up book by Jan Pieńkowski
- "The Haunted House", a lost story by H. P. Lovecraft

== Music ==
- "Haunted House", a 1964 hit song by Jumpin' Gene Simmons
- "Haunted House", a song by The Bee Gees from the 1993 album Size Isn't Everything
- Haunted House (EP), a 2013 EP by Knife Party
- Haunted House, a musical partnership by Paul Hartnoll and Lianne Hall
- "The Haunted House", a song by Irving Berlin
- "Haunted House", a song by Mckenna Grace
- "Haunted House", a 2019 song by Florence and the Machine
- Haunted House, a song by Holly Humberstone from the 2021 EP The Walls Are Way Too Thin

== Other ==
- Haunted House Ice Cream, a UK ice cream brand

== See also ==
- Haunted Homes, UK TV show
- Haunted mansion (disambiguation)
- Ghost House (disambiguation)
