= Avibacterium endocarditidis =

Scientific classification
- Domain: Bacteria
- Kingdom: Pseudomonadati
- Phylum: Pseudomonadota
- Class: Gammaproteobacteria
- Order: Pasteurellales
- Family: Pasteurellaceae
- Genus: Avibacterium
- Species: A. endocarditidis

Binomial name
- Avibacterium endocarditidis Bisgaard et al. 2007

Type strain
- 20186H4H1, CCUG 52860, DSM 18224

Species of bacterium

Avibacterium endocarditidis is a gram-negative bacterium from the genus of Avibacterium which has been isolated from a chicken with valvular endocarditis in Denmark.
