= Avian adenovirus =

Aviadenovirus

Virus classification
- (unranked): Virus
- Realm: Varidnaviria
- Kingdom: Bamfordvirae
- Phylum: Preplasmiviricota
- Class: Pharingeaviricetes
- Order: Rowavirales
- Family: Adenoviridae
- Genus: Aviadenovirus

Genus of viruses

Aviadenoviruses are adenoviruses that affect birds—particularly chickens, ducks, geese, turkeys and pheasants. There are 29 species in this genus. Viruses in this genus cause specific disease syndromes such as Quail Bronchitis (QB), Egg Drop Syndrome (EDS), Haemorrhagic Enteritis (HE), Pheasant Marble Spleen Disease (MSD), and Inclusion Body Hepatitis (IBH). Avian adenoviruses have a worldwide distribution and it is common to find multiple species on a single farm. The most common serogroups are serogroup 1, 2 and 3.

== Transmission ==
No evidence of transmission from birds to humans has been identified. The virus is mainly spread horizontally by the oro-fecal route, but vertical transmission can occur in serogroup 1. Once it has infected the bird the virus may remain latent until a period of stress, when it may then cause clinical disease.

== Clinical signs and diagnosis ==
Infections are normally subclinical, however clinical disease can occur—especially in young birds as maternal antibody levels begin to wane.

Clinical signs are related to the organ affected.

Signs of gastrointestinal disease (Haemorrhagic Enteritis) include diarrhea, anorexia, melena and hematochezia. Anaemia and dehydration may develop secondary to this haemorrhagic enteritis. Signs of reproductive disease (Egg Drop Syndrome) include low egg production/hatching and the laying of abnormal eggs (size, shape, colour, texture). Adenovirus infection may infect other organs, causing splenitis, inclusion body hepatitis, bronchitis, pulmonary congestion ventriculitis, pancreatitis, or oedema, depending on the species of bird infected.

Diagnosis of aviadenovirus is by histopathology, electron microscopy, viral isolation, ELISA and PCR. In addition, virus antigen can be detected double immunodiffusion. Postmortem examination may reveal a variety of clinical signs relating directly to the organ affected. Specifically, Egg Drop Syndrome can be diagnosed by hemagglutinin inhibition and the virus causes haemagglutination in chickens and ducks.

== Treatment and control ==
Vaccines for HE and EDS are available (ATCvet codes: QI01AA05 (WHO) for the inactivated vaccine, QI01AD05 (WHO) for the live vaccine, plus various combinations). Disease incidence may be reduced by minimising stress levels, using appropriate hygiene measures and providing adequate nutrition.

== Taxonomy ==
Aviadenovirus contains the following species, listed by scientific name and followed by the exemplar virus of the species:

- Aviadenovirus anatidae, Duck adenovirus 5
- Aviadenovirus anatis, Duck adenovirus 2
- Aviadenovirus anseris, Goose adenovirus 4
- Aviadenovirus bubonis, Indian eagle-owl adenovirus 1
- Aviadenovirus cairinae, Duck adenovirus 4
- Aviadenovirus cerasi, Duck adenovirus 6
- Aviadenovirus cinerei, Timneh grey parrot adenovirus 1
- Aviadenovirus columbae, Pigeon adenovirus 1
- Aviadenovirus columbidae, Pigeon adenovirus 2
- Aviadenovirus falconis, Falcon adenovirus 1
- Aviadenovirus gallinae, Fowl adenovirus 9
- Aviadenovirus gallopavoprimum, Turkey adenovirus 1
- Aviadenovirus gallopavoquartum, Turkey adenovirus 4
- Aviadenovirus gallopavoquintum, Turkey adenovirus 5
- Aviadenovirus gruis, Crane adenovirus 1
- Aviadenovirus hepatitidis, Fowl adenovirus 6
- Aviadenovirus hydropericardii, Fowl adenovirus 4
- Aviadenovirus leucophthalmi, Southern Psittacara leucophthalmus aviadenovirus, also called White-eyed parakeet adenovirus 2
- Aviadenovirus orioli, Black-naped oriole adenovirus, also called Oriolus adenovirus
- Aviadenovirus oti, Eurasian scops owl adenovirus 1, also called Otus scops adenovirus
- Aviadenovirus phalacrocoracidae, Great cormorant adenovirus 1
- Aviadenovirus podargidae, Tawny frogmouth adenovirus
- Aviadenovirus quintum, Fowl adenovirus 5
- Aviadenovirus roseae, Psittacine adenovirus 12
- Aviadenovirus rubri, Psittacine adenovirus 4
- Aviadenovirus senegalense, Psittacine adenovirus 1
- Aviadenovirus spinus, Eurasian siskin adenovirus 2
- Aviadenovirus turdi, Naumann's thrush adenovirus 1
- Aviadenovirus ventriculi, Fowl adenovirus 1

== Structure ==
Viruses in Aviadenovirus are non-enveloped, with icosahedral geometries, and T=25 symmetry. The diameter is around 90 nm. Genomes are linear and non-segmented, around 35–36kb in length and have a guanine/cytosine content of 53–59%. The genome codes for 40 proteins.

Genus	Structure	Symmetry	Capsid	Genomic arrangement	Genomic segmentation
Aviadenovirus	Polyhedral	Pseudo T=50	Non-enveloped	Linear	Monopartite

== Life cycle ==
Viral replication is nuclear. Entry into the host cell is achieved by attachment of the viral fiber glycoproteins to host receptors, which mediates endocytosis. Replication follows the DNA strand displacement model. DNA-templated transcription, with some alternative splicing mechanism is the method of transcription. The virus exits the host cell by nuclear envelope breakdown, viroporins, and lysis. Birds serve as the natural host.

Genus	Host details	Tissue tropism	Entry details	Release details	Replication site	Assembly site	Transmission
Aviadenovirus	Birds	None	Glycoprotiens	Lysis	Nucleus	Nucleus	Unknown
