= Avibacterium =

Scientific classification
- Domain: Bacteria
- Kingdom: Pseudomonadati
- Phylum: Pseudomonadota
- Class: Gammaproteobacteria
- Order: Pasteurellales
- Family: Pasteurellaceae
- Genus: Avibacterium; Blackall et al., 2005

Type species
- Avibacterium paragallinarum (Beaudette and Hudson 1937) Blackall et al. 2005

Species
- Avibacterium paragallinarum; Avibacterium gallinarum; Avibacterium avium; Avibacterium endocarditidis; Avibacterium volantium

Genus of bacteria

Avibacterium is a genus of Gram-negative, facultatively anaerobic, non-motile bacteria in the family Pasteurellaceae. Members of this genus are primarily associated with avian hosts and are often found in the upper respiratory tract of birds. Some species are important pathogens in poultry.

== Taxonomy ==
The genus Avibacterium was created in 2005 following taxonomic reclassification based on 16S rRNA gene sequencing and DNA–DNA hybridization studies, which showed that several species formerly classified within the genus Haemophilus were phylogenetically distinct.

== Species ==
Recognized species in the genus include:

- Avibacterium paragallinarum — the type species and causative agent of infectious coryza in chickens
- Avibacterium gallinarum
- Avibacterium avium
- Avibacterium endocarditidis
- Avibacterium volantium

== Pathogenicity ==
Avibacterium paragallinarum is the most clinically significant species in the genus. It causes infectious coryza, an acute respiratory disease in chickens, which results in nasal discharge, facial swelling, and reduced egg production. The disease is of considerable economic importance in poultry-producing regions worldwide.
