= Falcon adenovirus 1 =

Virus classification
- (unranked): Virus
- Realm: Varidnaviria
- Kingdom: Bamfordvirae
- Phylum: Preplasmiviricota
- Class: Pharingeaviricetes
- Order: Rowavirales
- Family: Adenoviridae
- Genus: Aviadenovirus
- Species: Aviadenovirus falconis

Species of virus

Falcon adenovirus 1, also called Falcon adenovirus A and Falcon aviadenovirus A, is an avian adenovirus that infects birds of the genus Falco, commonly called falcons. The virus was first discovered in 1996 in an epizootic of inclusion body hepatitis and enteritis in aplomado and peregrine falcons. It can also infect orange-breasted falcons, taitas, merlins, and American kestrels.

== Signs and symptoms ==
Symptoms of infection last for 1–2 days and include:

- Anorexia
- Dehydration
- Diarrhea
- Enteritis, the inflammation of the small intestines
- Inclusion bodies in the liver
- Necrotizing hepatitis
- Splenomegaly, the enlargement of the spleen

== Diagnosis ==
To allow screening of captive birds for virus shedding and investigations of disease outbreaks, conventional and quantitative PCR assays as well as in situ hybridization techniques have been developed to identify the DNA of Falcon adenovirus 1. If the falcon has died, a necropsy can be performed to look for intranuclear inclusion bodies and necrosis in the liver and inflamed small intestines. Testing for serum neutralizing antibodies can also be used to identify if a bird has been infected by the virus.

== Transmission ==
Transmission of Falcon adenovirus 1 occurs horizontally through the fecal-oral route. Cross-species brooding of eggs increases the risk of infection. The primary way to stop transmission is to separate sick falcons from uninfected ones susceptible to infection.

== Epidemiology ==
As Falcon adenovirus 1 infects falcons found throughout North America, the virus likely has a large geographic distribution. Serosurveys of captive and wild peregrine falcons have revealed a seroprevalence of 80-100%, although clinical disease is rarely reported in this species, which suggests they are the natural reservoir of the virus. In other falcon species, seroprevalence ranges from 43 to 57%. Wild American kestrels caught have sometimes been infected, indicating the virus to be circulating in wild populations.
