= Avian infectious bronchitis =

Respiratory disease of chickens

- Specialty: Veterinary medicine

Avian infectious bronchitis (IB) is an acute and highly contagious respiratory disease of chickens. The disease is caused by avian infectious bronchitis virus (IBV), a coronavirus (Coronaviridae, Orthocoronavirinae, genus Gammacoronavirus, subgenus Igacovirus), and characterized by respiratory signs including gasping, coughing, sneezing, tracheal rales, and nasal discharge. In young chickens, severe respiratory distress may occur. In layers, respiratory distress, nephritis, decrease in egg production, and loss of internal (watery egg white) and external (fragile, soft, irregular or rough shells, shell-less) egg quality are reported.

== Clinical signs ==
Coughing and rattling are common, most severe in young, such as broilers, and rapidly spreading in chickens confined or at proximity. Morbidity is 100% in non-vaccinated flocks. Mortality varies according to the virus strain (up to 60% in non-vaccinated flocks). Respiratory signs will subdue within two weeks. However, for some strains, a kidney infection may follow, causing mortality by toxemia. Younger chickens may die of tracheal occlusion by mucus (lower end) or by kidney failure. The infection may prolong in the cecal tonsils.

In laying hens, there can be transient respiratory signs, but mortality may be negligible. However, egg production drops sharply. A great percentage of produced eggs are misshapen and discolored. Many laid eggs have a thin or soft shell and poor albumen (watery), and are not marketable or proper for incubation. Normally-colored eggs, indicative of normal shells for instance in brown chickens, have a normal hatchability.

Egg yield curve may never return to normal. Milder strains may allow normal production after around eight weeks.

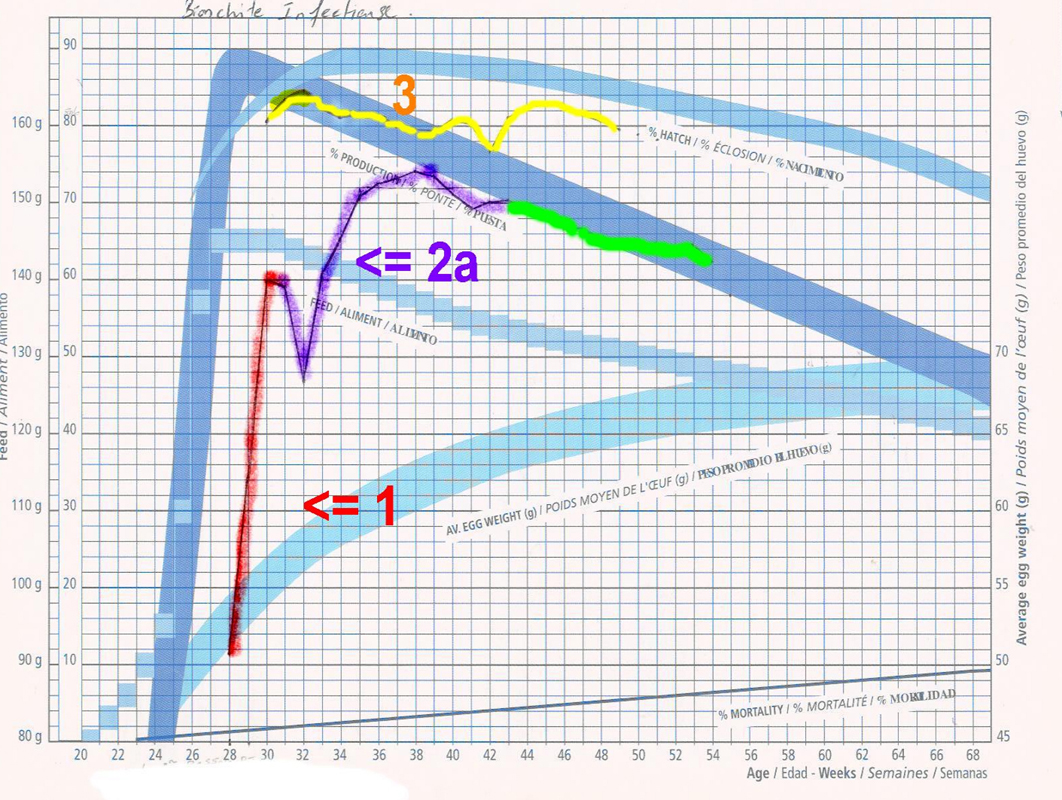
Egg yield curve in BI in a parent flock

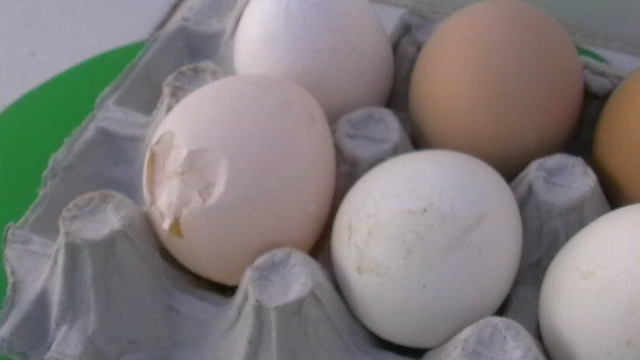
Thin-shelled egg

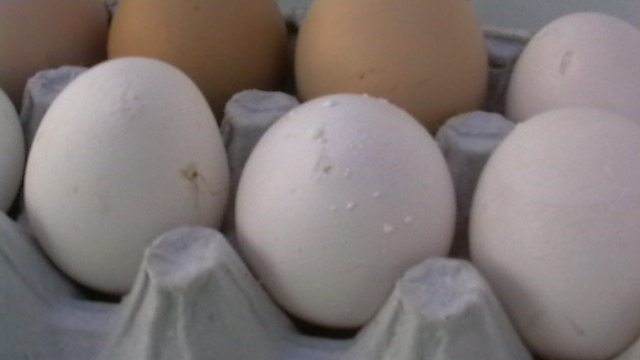
Abnormal granulations on shell

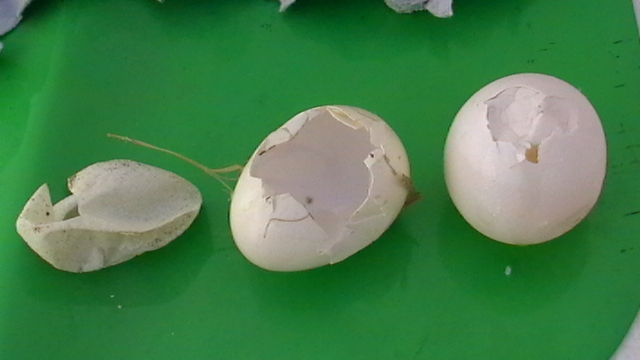
Soft-shelled eggs

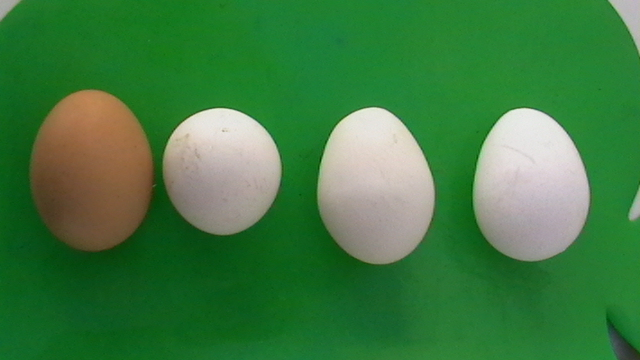
Misshapen and discolored eggs

== Cause ==
IBV was the first coronavirus described and varies greatly genetically and phenotypically, with hundreds of serotypes and strains described. The most updated classification of IBV places the virus in Coronaviridae, Orthocoronavirinae, genus Gammacoronavirus, subgenus Igacovirus. The coronaviruses contain the largest known viral RNA genome in number of nucleotides, of approximately 30,000 bases. The virions are enveloped and characterized by large surface projections (spikes or S) partially embedded in the double lipid layer. The genome consists of RNA of a single monopartite strand and is coated by the N protein (nucleocapsid). IBV diversity, as for all RNA viruses, may occur as transcriptional error and nucleotide substitution. Nucleotide variants (genotypes), in the gene encoding the distal S protein region (S1), may become very relevant if a different amino acid (non-synonymous) is encoded, and the new phenotype has different biological properties (strain). Amino acid changes located in the receptor binding domain of the S1 spike protein region, involved in the adsorption to the cellular receptor (sialic acid of cell-surface glycoprotein), may evade neutralization by antibodies, although still capable of adsorption to cell receptor and fusion. As a result of selective pressure, variants may infect chickens with immunity to heterologous variants and emerge with evolutional advantage. In addition, large genomic changes will occur with entire gene segments interchanges by reassortment, as during IBV replication, seven subgenomic mRNAs are produced, which enable reassortment in coinfections. When two strains of coronavirus IBV infect a host cell, reassortment may occur, and appears to contribute to the genetic variation of the IBV genome in nature.

== Diagnosis ==
Chicken respiratory diseases are difficult to differentiate and may not be diagnosed based on respiratory signs and lesions. Other diseases such as mycoplasmosis by Mycoplasma gallisepticum (chronic respiratory disease), Newcastle disease by mesogenic strains of Newcastle diseases virus (APMV-1), Avian metapneumovirus, infectious laryngotracheitis, avian infectious coryza Avibacterium paragallinarum in some stages may clinically resemble IB. Similar kidney lesions may be caused by different etiologies, including other viruses, such as infectious bursal disease virus (the cause of Gumboro disease) and toxins (for instance ochratoxins of Aspergillus ochraceus), and dehydration.

In laying hens, abnormal and reduced egg production are also observed in Egg Drop Syndrome 76 (EDS), caused by an Atadenovirus and avian metapneumovirus infections. At present, IB is more common and far more spread than EDS. The large genetic and phenotypic diversity of IBV have been resulting in common vaccination failures. In addition, new strains of IBV, not present in commercial vaccines, can cause the disease in IB vaccinated flocks. Attenuated vaccines will revert to virulence by consecutive passage in chickens in densely populated areas, and may reassort with field strains, generating potentially important variants.

Definitive diagnosis relies on viral isolation and characterization. For virus characterization, the methodology using genomic amplification (PCR), firstly by the reverse transcription of viral RNA into cDNA, the cyclic amplification of cDNA and sequencing of products, will enable very precise description of strains, according to the oligonucleotide primers designed and target gene. Broadly sensitive universal gene targets are the nucleoprotein, the matrix or the S2 encoding genes. The S1 encoding gene products sequencing may enable phylogenetic results which are comparable to serotyping. Methods for IBV antigens detection may employ labelled antibodies, such as direct immunofluorescence or immunoperoxidase. Antibodies to IBV may be detected by indirect immunofluorescent antibody test, ELISA and Haemagglutination inhibition (haemagglutinating IBV produced after enzymatic treatment by phospholipase C).

== Treatment and prevention ==
No specific treatment is available, but antibiotics can be used to prevent secondary infections.

Different vaccine formulations are available (ATCvet codes: QI01AA03 (WHO) for the inactivated vaccines, typically oil-emulsioned and combined with other avian pathogens, and QI01AD07 (WHO) for the active (live) lyophilized strain vaccines, such as H120 and Ma5.

Biosecurity protocols, including adequate distancing of flocks, isolation and disinfection are important in controlling the spread of the infection and disease.
