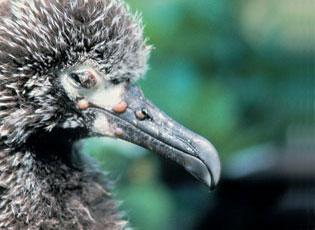
- Example of clinical signs produced by Fowlpox virus

Virus classification
- (unranked): Virus
- Realm: Varidnaviria
- Kingdom: Bamfordvirae
- Phylum: Nucleocytoviricota
- Class: Pokkesviricetes
- Order: Chitovirales
- Family: Poxviridae
- Genus: Avipoxvirus
- Species: Avipoxvirus fowlpox

= Fowlpox =

Fowlpox virus

Viral disease of poultry

Fowlpox is the worldwide disease of poultry caused by viruses of the family Poxviridae and the genus Avipoxvirus. The viruses causing fowlpox are distinct from one another but antigenically similar, possible hosts including chickens, turkeys, quail, canaries, pigeons, and many other species of birds. There are two forms of the disease. The first (dry form) is spread by biting insects (especially mosquitoes) and wound contamination, and causes lesions on the comb, wattles, and beak. Birds affected by this form usually recover within a few weeks. The second (wet form) is contracted by inhalation or ingestion of the virus via dust (i.e. dander, representing virus-infected cells shed from cutaneous lesions) or aerosols, leading to the 'diphtheritic form' of the disease, in which diphtheritic membranes form in the mouth, pharynx, larynx, and sometimes the trachea. The prognosis for this form is poor.

== Fowlpox in chickens ==
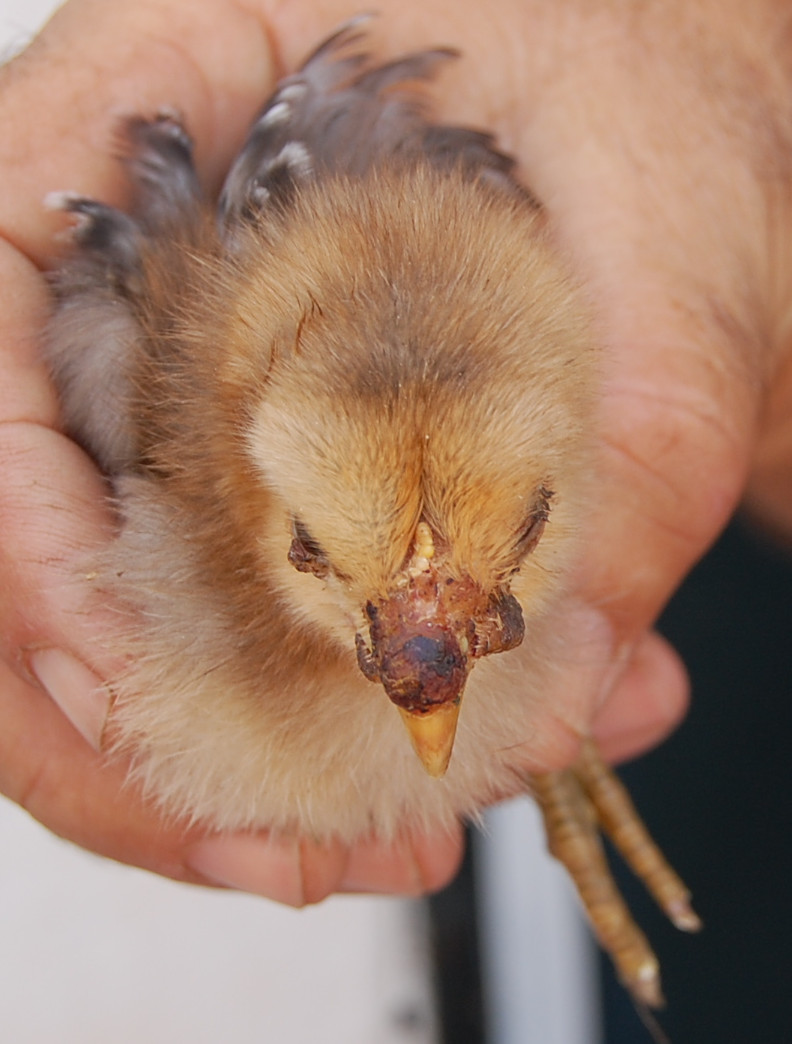
An unvaccinated chick with fowlpox lesions on the beak and around the eye.

Fowlpox is a common disease in backyard chickens that have not been vaccinated. Most birds survive the infections, although very young or weak birds may be lost. The lesions initially looks like a whitish blister and appear on the comb, wattles and other skin areas. In rare cases lesions can be found on the body, legs and even sometimes the softer parts of the beak. The blisters develop into a dark scab and take about three weeks to heal and drop off. Fowlpox lesions, when in the infected birds mouth and throat can cause difficulty breathing, even death. Management of the mosquito population can help reduce outbreaks of fowlpox.

Fowlpox has demonstrated the capacity to contain integrated sequence from Reticuloendotheliosis virus (REV). Integrated sequence of REV may contain the complete REV provirus sequence or fragments of genome sequence. Not all fowlpox isolates contain REV integrates. Studies analyzing samples from 50 years ago have detected evidence of REV integrated sequences suggesting the integration of REV may not be a new emergence. Fowlpox with integrated REV sequences have been identified in some live fowlpox vaccine lots, in backyard chickens and in wild birds. Fowlpox infections with integrated REV sequence are linked with the development of lymphoma.

== Clinical signs ==
There are 2 types of fowlpox: wet pox and dry pox. In all outbreaks, wart-like lumps are visible on many birds, which is a reliable guide to diagnosis.

Dry pox is the most common and develops as wart-like eruptions. Fleshy pale lumps form yellow pimples that may enlarge and run together to form masses of yellow crusts. These scabs darken and fall off in about a week. They occur mainly on the comb, wattle and face but can occur on other parts of the body.

Wet pox (diphtheritic) forms as ulcerous cheesy masses in the mouth, nose and sometimes throat areas, which can interfere with eating and breathing. Birds with wet pox can appear unwell and in some cases may die.

Mortality is usually low in affected flocks. Reduced egg production and poor weight gains are the greatest impacts.

== Treatment ==
Vaccines are available for fowlpox (ATCvet code: QI01AD12 (WHO)). Chicken are usually vaccinated with pigeonpox virus. This vaccine is usually given to chickens when between the age of 8–14 weeks of age, via the wing web method of injection. When a bird is given the vaccine they are exposed to a mild version of the active virus, so they should be completely healthy to prevent severe illness. Turkeys are also routinely vaccinated. Once a bird is infected there are no treatments, just preventive measures including the vaccine and mosquito management.

== See also ==
- Turkeypox
- Pigeonpox
