= Pock =

Pock, or Pöck, is a surname commonly associated with Austrian heritage. The surname is somewhat uncommon in the United States. It may refer to:

- Bernhard Pock (1963–1996), stunt actor
- Pontoffel Pock, fictional character in a Dr. Seuss film
- Thomas Pöck (born 1981), Austrian-American ice hockey player
- Tobias Pock (1609–1683), Austrian Baroque painter
- Friedrich von Pöck (1825–1884), Austrian admiral and commander of the Austro-Hungarian Navy (1871–1883)

== Pop Culture ==
- Phineas P. Pock, a character appearing in every version of the Haunted Mansion except for Mystic Manor and a singing bust

== See also ==
- POC (disambiguation)
- Beauty and Pock Face, a Chinese fairy tale
- Pox (disambiguation)
- Pocky
