= ALVAC-CEA vaccine =

Cancer vaccine

ALVAC-CEA vaccine is a cancer vaccine containing a canary pox virus (ALVAC) combined with the carcinoembryonic antigen (CEA) human gene.

A phase I trial in 118 patients showed safety in humans.
