= Ghost House =

Ghosthouse or Ghost House may refer to:

== Film ==
- The Ghost House (film), a 1917 American silent film directed by William C. deMille
- Ghosthouse (film)，1988 Italian film
- Ghost House (2004 film), South Korean horror-comedy film
- Ghost House (2017 film), American film
- Bhoot Bungla (lit. 'Ghost House'), a 1965 Indian horror film

== Other uses ==
- Ghost House (video game), 1986 video game
- The Ghost House (audiobook), a 2008 novel by Stephen Cole, also published in The Sarah Jane Adventures Collection
- Ghost House Pictures, American film production company
- Ghosthouse, a house often perceived as being inhabited by disembodied spirits of the deceased, also known as a haunted house

== See also ==
- Haunted house (disambiguation)
