= Derzsy's disease =

Goose parvovirus

Virus classification
- (unranked): Virus
- Realm: Floreoviria
- Kingdom: Shotokuvirae
- Phylum: Cossaviricota
- Class: Quintoviricetes
- Order: Piccovirales
- Family: Parvoviridae
- Genus: Dependoparvovirus
- Species: Dependoparvovirus anseriform1
- Virus: Goose parvovirus

Viral disease of geese

Derzsy's disease is a goose disease caused by Goose parvovirus.

The virus is shed in the faeces and thus transmission is horizontal, via the direct faecal-oral route and also indirectly via fomites. Vertical transmission is also possible.

Clinical disease only occurs in young geese between birth and 4–5 weeks of age.

== Epidemiology ==
Several genotypes have been described. The genotype is based upon the sequence of the VP3 protein. The virus is primarily transmitted through the fecal-oral route. Infected birds shed high concentrations of the virus in their droppings, contaminating feed, water, and bedding. Vertical transmission (from breeder birds to eggs) also occurs, leading to outbreaks in hatcheries.

== Clinical signs and diagnosis ==
Some signs of Derzsy's disease in geese include prostration and death in acutely affected goslings, reduced feed intake, excessive water intake, swollen eyelids, eye and nasal discharge, white diarrhea, the presence of a membrane covering the tongue, loss of down, and reddening of the skin.

Acute disease leads to death in most birds between the ages of 7–10 days. Clinical signs are quite limited in those cases. Older animals tend to show severe systemic and neurological signs and diarrhoea. Adults do not show any clinical signs.

Viral isolation should be attempted for diagnosis, and immunofluorescence and electron microscopy can confirm the viral infection. Pathological changes may also help the diagnosis.

== Treatment and control ==
No treatment exists for the viral infection. Antibiotics may help prevent secondary infections.

Vaccination is available in different forms, usually for naive flocks.. Breeding geese are vaccinated 3–4 weeks before the laying season to provide passive immunity to goslings through the yolk.

Good biosecurity measures should be maintained including adequate quarantine, isolation, separation of different age groups and disinfection.
