= Starlingpox =

Starlingpox virus

Virus classification
- (unranked): Virus
- Realm: Varidnaviria
- Kingdom: Bamfordvirae
- Phylum: Nucleocytoviricota
- Class: Pokkesviricetes
- Order: Chitovirales
- Family: Poxviridae
- Genus: Avipoxvirus
- Virus: Starlingpox virus

Avipox virus

Starlingpox virus is a virus of the Avipoxvirus genus belonging to the Chordopoxvirinae subfamily and the Poxviridae family, impacting various starling songbird species (Weli and Tryland 2011). The starling variant, Starlingpox virus has been linked to another variant, the Mynahpox virus, supporting theorizations that each variation belongs to a subclade, Sturnindaepox virus (Gyuranecz, et al. 2013). Avian pox viruses are widespread, double-stranded, DNA genome viruses that have been found in cutaneous and diphtheritic forms in over 230 bird species.

== Signs and symptoms ==
The virus presents with "dry", cutaneous, "wart-like" lesions that may cause vision impairments and trouble eating, or "wet", diphtheritic lesions that may disrupt respiration or lead to secondary bacterial or fungal infections (Lawson, et al., 2012). The most well-known symptoms are lesions on the head, concentrated around the eyes and base of the beak (Bateson and Asher, 2010). Infected birds often have crusted or nodular regions on areas of skin without feathers, including the feet (Axelson 2022). Other common symptoms of avipoxviruses include difficulty breathing, conjunctivitis, emaciation, difficulty swallowing, and weakness (Michigan.gov 2022.) Virus particles may aerosolize and be transmitted via inhalation or remain active in dried scabs for years (Wildlife Futures Program, 2021). The prevalence of symptoms depends on the route of exposure.

== Transmission ==
Transmission occurs through contact with vectors or other infected birds. Several species of arthropods, like the Culex quinquefasciatus and Aedes aegypti, act as mechanical vectors for avipoxvirus transmission (Sores van der Meer, et al., 2022). Infected mosquitos are capable of spreading the virus to uninfected birds for more than one month, while infected birds will spread the virus through direct contact with food or water sources and contaminated perches or feeders (Michigan.gov 2022). Virus particles may aerosolize and be transmitted via inhalation or remain active in dried scabs for years (Wildlife Futures Program, 2021). The prevalence of symptoms depends on the route of exposure.

== Diagnosis and treatment ==
A positive diagnosis of avian pox virus within a population, or for an individual bird, can be challenging to reach because visual observations of pox lesions may be hard to obtain or may not develop at all (Galvin, et al., 2022). Current diagnostic methods that work alongside visual identification include electron microscopy, histopathology examinations, virus isolation, PCR sequencing, and necropsy. There are no definitive treatments due to species and virus variations, though general supportive measures like mineral supplements, probiotics, and vitamins are used to aid in recovery processes (Corvid Isle, 2021).

== Prevention and management ==
Efforts to control and prevent the spread of avian pox viruses in wild populations involve the elimination of mosquito breeding locations, gathering site disinfection, and domestic bird vaccine distribution (Wildlife Futures Program, 2021). When applicable, domestic poultry owners are advised to avoid sharing farm equipment with others, disinfect equipment as needed, and quarantine any birds that return after leaving the flock for up to 30 days (University of Minnesota Extension, 2022). Additional measures to mitigate the spread among wild populations include so-called "bird-table hygiene recommendations" like providing fresh drinking water each day, rotating garden feeders, and removal of old food, which are thought to disrupt disease transmission in areas where virus concentrations are high (Corvid Isle, 2021).
