= Pantoate kinase =

Identifiers
- EC no.: 2.7.1.169

Databases
- IntEnz: IntEnz view
- BRENDA: BRENDA entry
- ExPASy: NiceZyme view
- KEGG: KEGG entry
- MetaCyc: metabolic pathway
- PRIAM: profile
- PDB structures: RCSB PDB PDBe PDBsum
Search
- PMC: articles
- PubMed: articles
- NCBI: proteins

Pantoate kinase (EC 2.7.1.169, PoK, TK2141 protein) is an enzyme with systematic name ATP:(R)-pantoate 4-phosphotransferase. This enzyme catalyses the following chemical reaction

ATP +
(R)-pantoic acid
ADP +
(R)-4-phosphopantoic acid

The enzyme characterised from the archaea, Thermococcus kodakaraensis, converts (R)-pantoic acid to (R)-4-phosphopantoic acid by transferring a phosphate group from the cofactor, adenosine triphosphate (ATP), which is converted to adenosine diphosphate (ADP).

4'-phosphopantetheine

The reaction is part of the biosynthesis of phosphopantetheine.
