= Haunted House (arcade game) =

1972 arcade game

- Manufacturer: Midway
- Release date: January 1972
- System: Electro-mechanical
- Model #: 553
- Players: 1

Haunted House is an arcade game released in 1972 by Midway Manufacturing Company.

== Description ==
Haunted House is a Dale Gun style rifle game.

== Features ==
- Four Targets
  - x2 Cats
  - x1 Witch
  - x1 Grave Robber
- 3-Dimensional Playfield
- Backlight lighting
- Gun Recoil
- Adaptive Difficulty

== Sound effects ==
Haunted House uses a special 4-channel 8-track player to produce background music and sound effects. The background sound plays continually, but the player momentarily changes tracks for the appropriate target hit.

== See also ==
- Arcade game
- Haunted House Pinball
