= Haunted Mansion =

Haunted Mansion may also refer to:

- Haunted house, house or other structure inhabited by disembodied spirits
- Haunted attraction (simulated), a type of amusement attraction

== Disney ==
- The Haunted Mansion, a dark ride attraction located at multiple Disney theme parks
  - The Haunted Mansion (2003 film), a film starring Eddie Murphy based on the Disney attraction
  - Muppets Haunted Mansion, a 2021 puppet comedy Halloween special based on the Disney attraction
  - Haunted Mansion (2023 film), a film starring LaKeith Stanfield and Rosario Dawson based on the Disney attraction
- Haunted Mansion Holiday, a seasonal overlay of the Disney attraction
- Haunted Mansion (comics), an anthology series by Slave Labor Graphics inspired by the Disney attraction
- The Haunted Mansion (video game), based on the Disney attraction and 2003 film of the same name

== Other uses ==
- Haunted Mansion (1998 film), a 1998 Hong Kong film
- Haunted Mansion (2015 film), a 2015 Philippine film
- Bhoot Bungla (lit. 'Haunted Mansion'), a 1965 Indian horror film

== See also ==
- haunted house (disambiguation)
