= Pullorum disease =

Bacterial disease of poultry

Pullorum disease in poultry is caused by the bacterium Salmonella pullorum. The disease affects mainly young chicks, but can also affect older chickens, and other domestic fowl.

In young flocks mortality can be very high, between 80 and 100 percent. Symptoms include weakness or depression, white diarrhea and cluster near heat sources.

The historical name for this disease is bacillary white diarrhea. Pullorum bacteria were identified in 1899, and a blood test was developed in 1913. To control the disease in the US, the National Poultry Improvement Plan was implemented in 1935. By 1970, testing, identification and destruction of infected flocks had generally eradicated the disease.

Treatment of Pullorum is not recommended, as the goal is the eradication of the disease. Most US states ban the import of poultry unless they are certified pullorum clean.

In Canada, Pullorum is a "reportable" disease - all suspected cases must be reported to Canadian Food Inspection Agency (CFIA). Canada has been considered free of the disease since the 1980s. Ontario requires all breeder flocks to be registered and mortality monitored. A high mortality incidence would trigger testing of dead birds. Hatcheries must be registered and undergo routine surveillance testing.
