= Paid outside closing =

Paid outside closing (POC) is the fees or payments rendered outside normal title insurance and underwriting fees due at the time of closing a loan. When acquiring a mortgage or refinancing, a lender or broker may show that an appraisal fee is POC because the fee is usually due at the time of service, prior to closing. For a $0 closing cost loan, this is often refunded to the borrower at the time of closing.

== Disclosure on closing forms ==
In United States mortgage disclosures, an item paid outside closing is a cost that is not paid from closing funds but would otherwise be disclosed on the closing form. Regulation Z provides that such items should be marked with the phrase "Paid Outside of Closing" or the abbreviation "P.O.C." and should include the name of the party making the payment.

For this purpose, closing funds are funds collected and disbursed at the real estate closing. The designation therefore indicates how a cost was paid, rather than whether the cost is part of the loan estimate or closing disclosure process.
