= Infectious coryza in chickens =

Bacterial disease of chickens

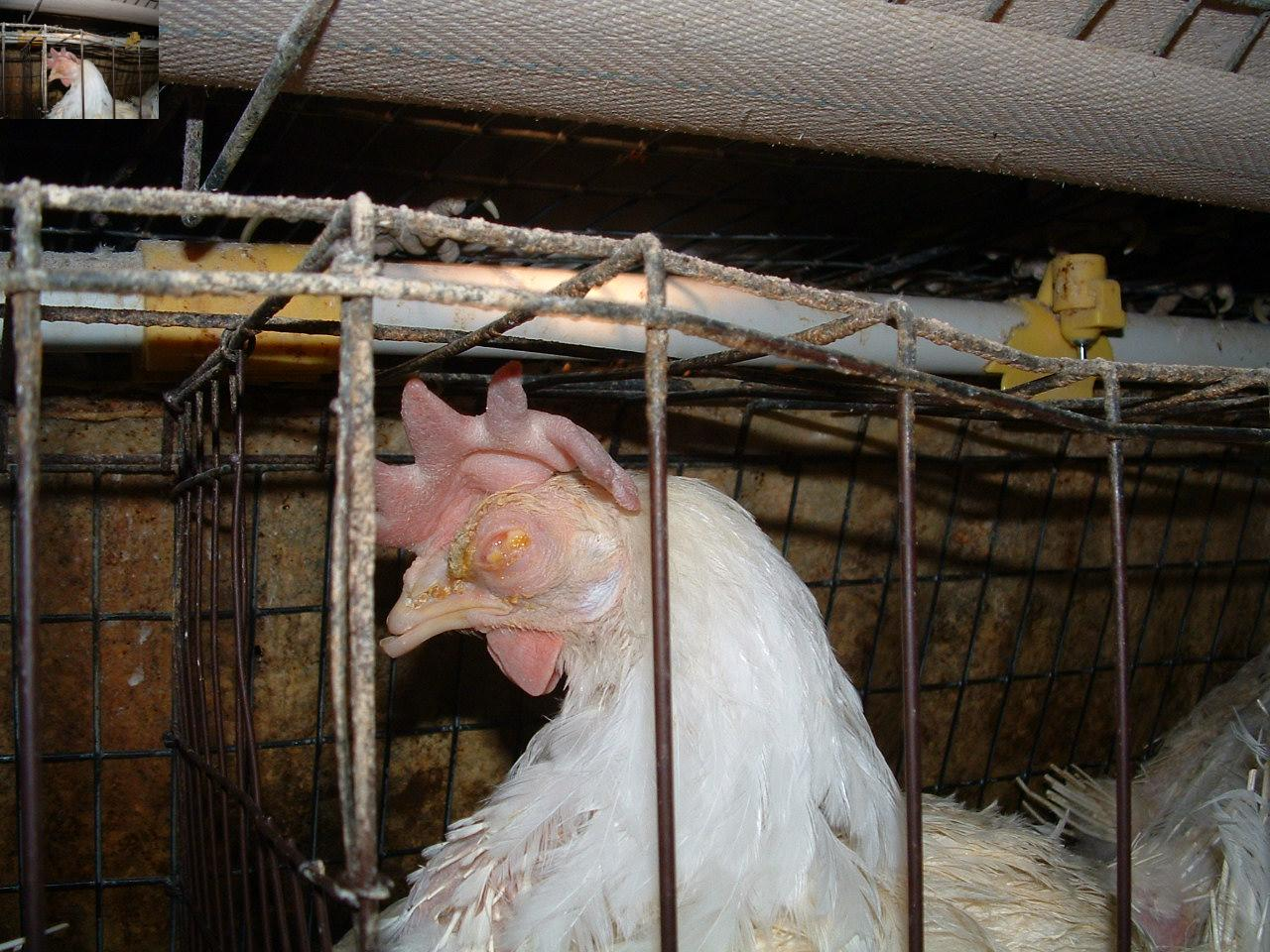
Layer hen with nasal discharge and severe periorbital swelling with exudate.

Infectious coryza is a serious bacterial disease of chickens that affects the respiratory system, and it is manifested by inflammation of the area below the eye, nasal discharge, and sneezing. The disease is found all over the world, causing high economic losses, which are due to stumping off and reduction of egg production in case of laying chickens. The disease was discovered early 1930s by considering clinical signs.

== Signs and symptoms ==
Clinical appearance of the disease includes depression, a serous nasal discharge, and sporadically minor facial inflammation in the mild form of the disease. In severe form, severe inflammation of one or both infraorbital sinuses with edema of the surrounding tissue occurs. The swelling can cause closure of one or both eyes. Intermandibular space and wattles of cocks do swell in the course of the disease.

== Cause ==
The disease is caused by the bacterium Avibacterium paragallinarum, which is Gram-negative. The bacterium is microaerophilic, rod-shaped, and nonmotile. Its growth requires the presence of nicotinamide adenine dinucleotide. The three serovars of A. paragallinarum are A, B, and C, related by immunotype specificity.

=== Transmission ===
The reservoirs of the disease are carrier chickens that could be healthy, but harboring the disease, or chronically sick. The disease affects all ages of chickens. The disease can persist in the flock for 2-3 weeks and signs of the disease are seen 1–3 days after infection. Transmission of the disease is through direct interaction, airborne droplets, and drinking contaminated water. Chickens having infection and those carriers contribute highly to the disease transmission.

== Diagnosis ==
Diagnosis is by isolation of bacteria from chickens suspected to have a history of coryza and clinical findings from infected chickens. Polymerase chain reaction testing is a reliable means of diagnosis of the disease.

== Treatment ==
Prevention is through use of stock coryza-free birds. In other cases, culling of the whole flock is a good means of disease control. Bacterin also is used to reduce the severity of the disease. Precise exposure has also been used, but it should be done with care. Vaccination of chicks is done in areas with high disease occurrence. Treatment consists of using antibiotics such as erythromycin, dihydrostreptomycin, streptomycin, sulfonamides, tylosin, and fluoroquinolones.
