= Tremovirus =

Virus classification
- (unranked): Virus
- Realm: Riboviria
- Kingdom: Orthornavirae
- Phylum: Pisuviricota
- Class: Pisoniviricetes
- Order: Picornavirales
- Family: Picornaviridae
- Subfamily: Heptrevirinae
- Genus: Tremovirus

Genus of viruses

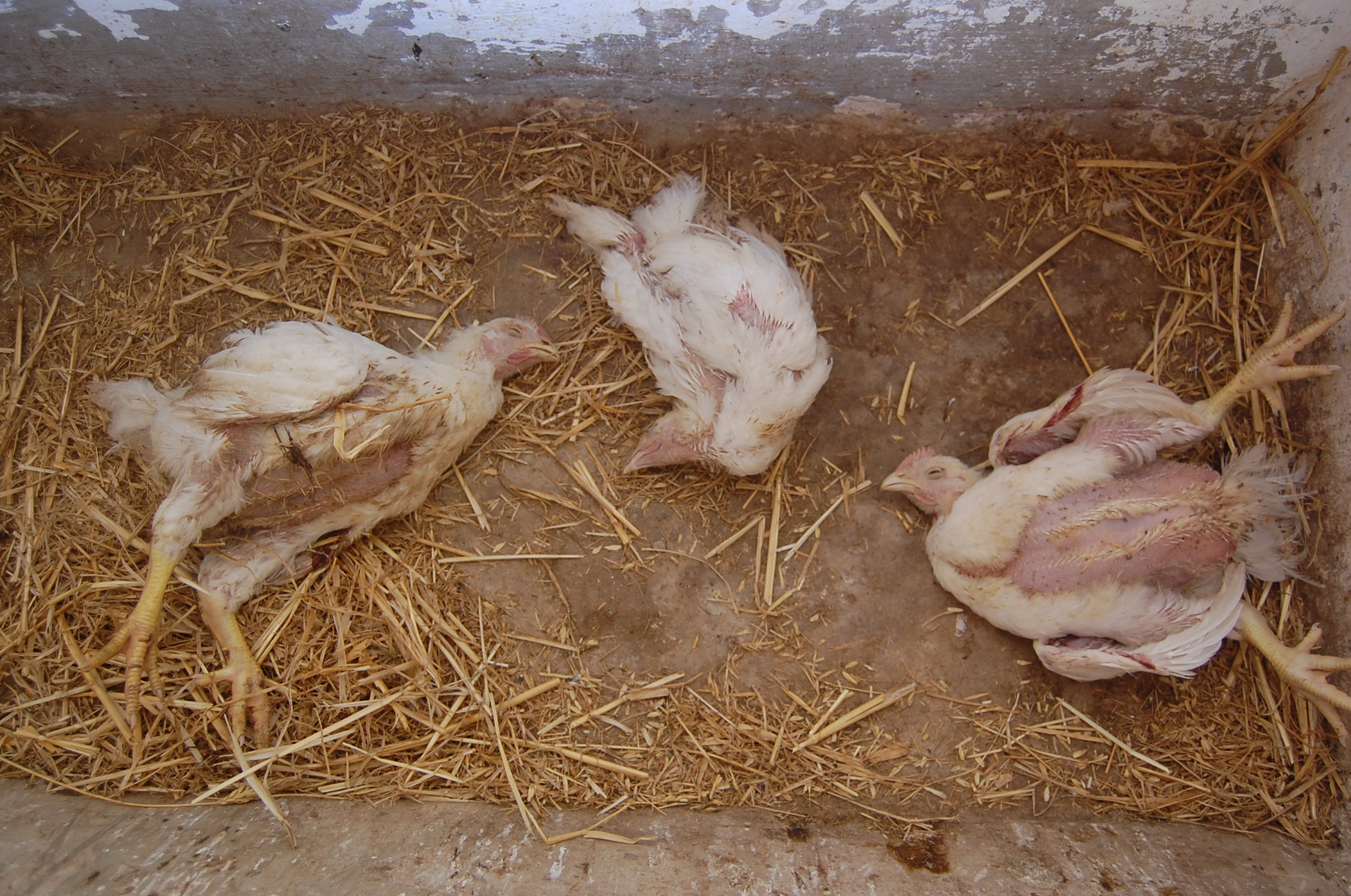
Chickens who died of Avian encephalomyelitis

Tremovirus is a virus genus belonging to the Picornaviridae family. The genus has two species, including Avian encephalomyelitis virus. The first avian picornavirus to have its genome sequenced, it causes epidemic tremor in chickens.

Avian encephalomyelitis virus is of economic importance to chicken farmers because it causes a drop in egg production in laying hens, and neurological diseases in chicks less than three weeks old.

The domestic host is the chicken, but it can also infect partridge, turkeys, quail, guineafowl, and pheasants. It has a worldwide distribution.

The virus can be spread by both vertical and horizontal transmission. It is not a zoonosis, meaning that it cannot be transmitted to humans.

== Symptoms and diagnosis ==
Neurological signs such as ataxia, tremor of the head and neck, drooping wings, weakness, paralysis, exercise intolerance and blindness are seen in chicks less than 3 weeks old. In laying hens the disease causes a temporary reduction in egg production.

Antibodies can be detected using an ELISA or virus neutralisation. Definitive diagnosis of the disease is by histopathology or virus isolation.

== Treatment and control ==
Currently, no treatment is available, but chicks that survive infection are immune. Control is achieved by vaccination of the flock. The vaccine can be administered via inoculation of the wing web, by drinking water or eyedrops, though eyedrop administration is much more effective. Mortality ranges from 25–60% and surviving animals are considered nonprofitable.

== Taxonomy ==
The genus Tremovirus contains the following species, listed by scientific name and followed by the exemplar virus of the species:

- Tremovirus aetremori; Tremovirus A1, commonly called Avian encephalomyelitis virus
- Tremovirus beturtli; Tremovirus B1, also called Pelodiscus sinensis picornavirus 1
