= Avipoxvirus =

Virus classification
- (unranked): Virus
- Realm: Varidnaviria
- Kingdom: Bamfordvirae
- Phylum: Nucleocytoviricota
- Class: Pokkesviricetes
- Order: Chitovirales
- Family: Poxviridae
- Subfamily: Chordopoxvirinae
- Genus: Avipoxvirus

Species
- See text

Genus of viruses

Avipoxvirus (avian pox) is a genus of viruses within the family Poxviridae. Poxviridae is the family of viruses which cause the afflicted organism to have poxes as a symptom. Poxviruses have generally large genomes, and other such examples include smallpox and monkeypox. Members of the genus Avipoxvirus infect specifically birds. Avipoxviruses are unable to complete their replication cycle in non-avian species. Although it is comparably slow-spreading, Avipoxvirus is known to cause symptoms like pustules lining the skin and diphtheria-like symptoms. These diphtheria-like symptoms might include diphtheric necrotic membranes lining the mouth and the upper respiratory tract. Like other avian viruses, it can be transmitted through vectors mechanically such as through mosquitoes. There is no evidence that this virus can infect humans.

Avipoxvirus is a virus that is brick-shaped and is usually 200 nanometres in diameter. This is much larger than many other viruses, which may be around 60 nanometres in diameter. This virus can be contracted only through vectors and consumption of infected items, but they can be filtered by a special water filter. This filter is called a Large Volume Water Sampler (LVWS).

Unlike other viruses, Avipoxvirus can withstand extreme dryness. With this advantage, it can spread on dust particles. This is because it has adapted to living in the dry mucous membranes of an infected host's upper respiratory tract.

The effects of this virus might increase the difficulty of breathing, eating, and drinking significantly. Exterior lesions usually are restricted to the nonfeathered parts of the body, especially the face and legs, where there is the characteristic proliferative and necrotizing dermatitis. Another feature of this bird pox that has been observed is the presence of blood sacs or blisters filled with bloody fluid that will collapse when pierced with a needle and allowed to drain. This virus has the highest mortality rate in upland game birds such as pheasant, quail, and chukar partridge, as well as in songbirds, seabirds such as gulls, parrots, and some raptors such as the peregrine falcon.

== History and prevalence ==
Avipoxviruses affect more than 230 species of wild and domestic birds worldwide. It affects a variety of birds including chickens, turkeys, songbirds, upland game birds, seabirds, pets, and occasionally raptors, but is rarely found in waterfowl or shore birds. Its prevalence among wild populations is unknown due to lack of studies It is most common in temperate (warm and humid) climates. All cases in North America have been relatively recent. The United States Geological Survey has reported an increased number of cases in multiple countries with new affected bird species added in recent years. This suggests avian pox is an emerging viral disease.

Mosquitoes that feed on birds are the most consistent and efficient transmitters of the virus. There appears to be a relationship between this virus and seasonal mosquito cycles. For example, in California and Oregon, prevalence is lowest in the dry summer months than the wetter seasons of autumn and winter. However, more research is required to test this hypothesis.

== Transmission ==
Mosquitoes are the most common vectors for transmission of the Avipoxvirus. Transmission occurs when a mosquito feeds on a bird in which the virus is circulating in the bloodstream or feeds near secretions from lesions. When the mosquito moves to a susceptible host and feeds, the new host is infected with the virus. The virus can also be transmitted indirectly by contaminated surfaces or airborne particles. Infections occur when the contaminated particles come in contact with mucous membranes or skin abrasions. While transmission by mosquitoes has been effective at spreading the virus in a localized setting, the transmission between infected individuals has allowed the virus to spread across long distances.

Avian pox viruses appear to be family or order specific, that is, a pox virus infecting gamebirds is not likely to infect songbirds and vice versa. There is no known evidence of any avian pox virus strain transmissible to humans.

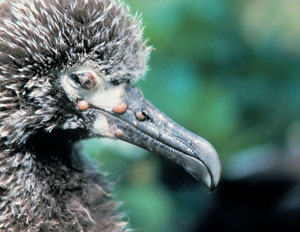
Avipoxvirus infection in a Laysan albatross chick

== Clinical signs ==
Lesions of the skin and diphtheritic membrane of the respiratory tract are common when domesticated and wild birds are infected with the Avipoxvirus. There are two common forms of clinical signs. Cutaneous pox are most common. They appear as wart-like growths around the eyes and other apterylae (feather-free) areas, sometimes in large clusters. Pock lesions can be concentrated or spread out. The size and number of growths depend on the severity of the infection. Diphtheritic, or wet, pox are characterized as raised yellow blemishes on mucous membranes of the mouth, esophagus, trachea, and lungs. These can lead to difficulty breathing or swallowing. In both cases, birds may appear weak and emaciated.

The infection of Avipoxvirus can lead to decreased egg production, reduced growth, blindness, and increased mortality in domestic poultry. In wild bird species, elevated predation, secondary infections, trauma, reduced male mating success, and death are common results.

== Prevention and control ==
Avian pox viruses are contagious pathogens, and once introduced into a captive community, can spread very quickly. The recommended method of preventing transmission is to prevent standing water in the environment (i.e., to avoid mosquitoes), decontaminate feeders, perches, cages etc., and avoid close confined contact of individual birds.

Vaccines have been developed from some species of the virus, such as Fowlpox, Canarypox, Pigeonpox, and Quailpox to help prevent infection in captive and domestic bird populations. There is no one specific treatment used for birds who have contracted the avipoxvirus. Often the avipoxvirus acts as an immune suppressant, leading to secondary bacterial infections, which are recommended for treatment. Common methods include use of iodine-glycerin applications to assist in healing lesions, use of antibiotics to attempt to control secondary infections, and use of vitamin A to supplement healing of lesions.

There is a demand for new vaccines, especially for endangered species. The development of a single vaccine that can treat all species has been difficult to develop, since the avipoxvirus is taxon specific. Currently, vaccination is not a plausible method of control for wild bird populations, where avipoxvirus is most prevalent. To improve this, there are current efforts in using the avipoxviruses as vectors for recombinant vaccines in order eventually evolve them into multiple species targeted vaccines.

== Virology ==
Avipoxvirus is a genus of viruses in the family Poxviridae in the subfamily Chordopoxvirinae. Birds serve as natural hosts. There are 12 species in this genus.

=== Taxonomy ===
The genus contains the following species, listed by scientific name and followed by the exemplar virus of the species:

- Avipoxvirus canarypox, Canarypox virus
- Avipoxvirus flamingopox, Flamingopox virus
- Avipoxvirus fowlpox, Fowlpox virus
- Avipoxvirus penguinpox, Penguinpox virus
- Avipoxvirus pigeonpox, Pigeonpox virus
- Avipoxvirus quailpox, Quailpox virus
- Avipoxvirus turkeypox, Turkeypox virus

=== Structure ===
Viruses in Avipoxvirus are enveloped. Genomes are linear, around 300kb in length.

Genus	Structure	Symmetry	Capsid	Genomic arrangement	Genomic segmentation
Avipoxvirus	Brick-shaped		Enveloped	Linear	Monopartite

=== Life cycle ===
Viral replication is cytoplasmic. Entry into the host cell is achieved by attachment of the viral proteins to host glycosaminoglycans (GAGs) mediates endocytosis of the virus into the host cell. Fusion with the plasma membrane to release the core into the host cytoplasm. Early phase: early genes are transcribed in the cytoplasm by viral RNA polymerase. Early expression begins at 30 minutes post-infection. Core is completely uncoated as early expression ends, viral genome is now free in the cytoplasm. Intermediate phase: Intermediate genes are expressed, triggering genomic DNA replication at approximately 100 minutes post-infection. Late phase: Late genes are expressed from 140 minutes to 48 hours post-infection, producing all structural proteins. Assembly of progeny virions starts in cytoplasmic viral factories, producing a spherical immature particle. This virus particle matures into brick-shaped intracellular mature virion (IMV). IMV virion can be released upon cell lysis, or can acquire a second double membrane from trans-Golgi and bud as external enveloped virion (EEV) host receptors, which mediates endocytosis. Replication follows the DNA strand displacement model. DNA-templated transcription is the method of transcription. The virus exits the host cell by existing in occlusion bodies after cell death and remaining infectious until finding another host.

Birds serve as the natural host. Transmission routes are mechanical, contact, and air borne particles.

Genus	Host details	Tissue tropism	Entry details	Release details	Replication site	Assembly site	Transmission
Avipoxvirus	Birds	None	Glycosaminoglycans	Lysis; budding	Cytoplasm	Cytoplasm	Arthropods; aerosol

== See also ==
- Starlingpox virus
