= Turkeypox virus =

Virus classification
- (unranked): Virus
- Realm: Varidnaviria
- Kingdom: Bamfordvirae
- Phylum: Nucleocytoviricota
- Class: Pokkesviricetes
- Order: Chitovirales
- Family: Poxviridae
- Genus: Avipoxvirus
- Species: Avipoxvirus turkeypox

Species of virus

Turkeypox virus is a virus of the family Poxviridae and the genus Avipoxvirus that causes turkeypox. It is one of the most common diseases in the wild turkey (Meleagris gallopavo) population. Turkeypox, like all avipoxviruses, is transmitted either through skin contact or by arthropods (typically mosquitos) acting as mechanical vectors.

Turkeypox virus was first reported in a turkey flock in New York by E.L. Burnett, and may be identified by nodular proliferative skin lesions on the non-feathered parts of the body and in the fibrino-necrotic and proliferative lesions in the mucous membrane of the upper respiratory tract.

== Viral classification ==
Turkeypox virus is a member of the family Poxviridae and is in the genus Avipoxvirus. There are currently nine other species within this genus, all of which are viruses: Fowlpox, Juncopox, Mynahpox, Psittacinepox, Sparrowpox, Starlingpox, Pigeonpox, Canarypox, and Quailpox.

Avipoxvirus infections have been reported in over 232 bird species in 23 orders of birds, but most of our knowledge comes from the study of Fowlpox virus and Canarypox virus as they are the only species with full genome sequences available.

== Structure and genome ==
Turkeypox virus, like other Avipoxviruses, is an enveloped, double-stranded DNA virus with a large, linear genome of approximately 300 kilobytes in size. The central region of the genome contains at least 90–100 homologous genes that are involved in viral replication, and these genes are generally relatively conserved among poxviruses. This is in contrast to the more variable, terminally located genes that have been shown to encode a diverse array of proteins involved in host range restriction.

== Replication ==
Avipoxviruses follow the same replication cycle that all poxviruses use. Poxvirus is unique from other DNA viruses in respect to its locale of replication in the cell. Poxvirus replicates in the cytoplasm instead of the nucleus. This phenomenon is made possible by the fact that poxvirus encodes its own transcriptional machinery, so poxvirus uses only the host translational machinery to produce its mature virions.

=== Entry and initial uncoating ===
Poxvirus starts its replication cycle by attaching to host cell receptors. These receptors are thought to be glycosaminoglycan. Once attached the virus uncoats by first losing its outer membrane and then fusing with the cellular membrane so that its core particle containing the genome can be released into the cytoplasm.

=== Early transcription ===
Once in the cytoplasm poxvirus then starts to express early genes. These early genes are expressions are mediated by virally encoded transcriptional machinery that includes: a heterodimeric transcription factor (vETF), a seven-subunit RNA polymerase, the heterodimeric capping enzyme/ termination protein, and the heterodimeric poly(A) polymerase. Also important for transcription is a capsidated RNA helicase, and two NTPases. These early transcripts are released from the core and translated by host ribosomes.

==== Translocation ====
The viral core is now translocated to the outside of the cell nucleus.

==== Second uncoating ====
After these early genes are transcribed and translated there is a second uncoating step in which the rest of the genome is released and exposed to the previously produced replications proteins. The viral genome is now replicated as concatamers and transcription and translation of intermediate genes (mainly coding for transcription factors) occurs.

==== Late transcription ====
Late viral genes are now being transcribed (most encode for structural proteins, enzymes and transcriptions factors) and are then translated.

==== Assembly and release ====
The concatameric intermediates produced earlier are now resolved into double strand DNA and packaged in the late viral proteins to produce and immature virions (IV). The immature virions mature through an unknown mechanism that may involve processing by the Golgi apparatus in the cell. They are now mature virions that are release from the cell by either lysing the cell or budding out from the membrane. It is through budding that they acquire their envelope.

== Tropism ==
Avipoxviruses, like all viruses, is an obligate intracellular parasite. It uses host translational machinery to replicate its genome. Avipoxviruses only infect birds, particularly wild fowl, and in this case, wild turkey (Meleagris gallopavo). Avipoxviruses are not able to complete their replication in non-avian species. Transmission of avipoxvirus occurs through a mosquito vector.
