= Pigeon pox =

Pigeonpox virus

Virus classification
- (unranked): Virus
- Realm: Varidnaviria
- Kingdom: Bamfordvirae
- Phylum: Nucleocytoviricota
- Class: Pokkesviricetes
- Order: Chitovirales
- Family: Poxviridae
- Genus: Avipoxvirus
- Species: Avipoxvirus pigeonpox

Viral disease of pigeons

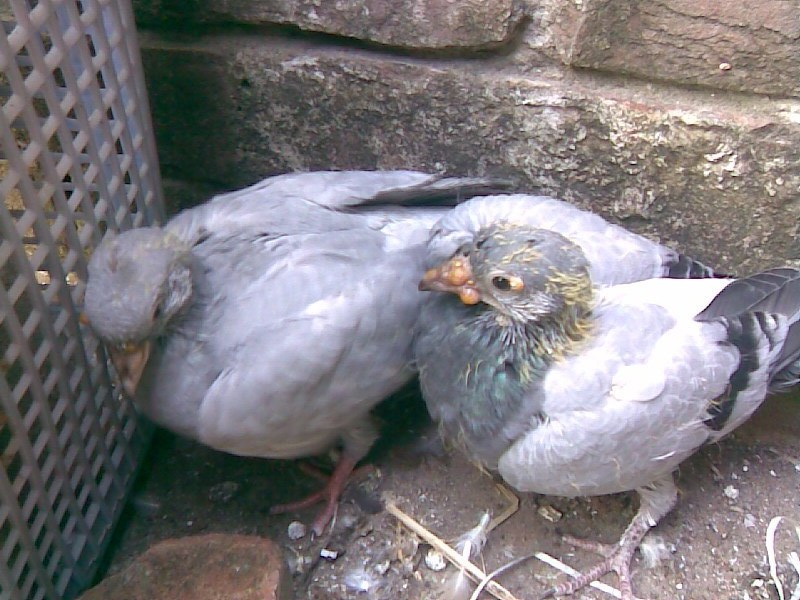
Typical symptoms of an infection with the pigeon pox virus

Pigeon pox is a viral disease to which only pigeons are susceptible. It is characterized by pox scabs, which most frequently form on the featherless parts of the bird. The disease is caused by the Pigeon pox virus. It can be transmitted by droplet infection from one animal to another, or more commonly through infected insects or the digestion of contaminated food or water.

There is a live viral vaccine available for Pigeon pox virus (ATCvet code: QI01ED01 (WHO)).

== Signs and symptoms ==
An animal infected with the pigeon pox virus may experience symptoms such as dehydration, uveitis and vision problems, reduction in egg production and behavioural differences. Such animals are described as quiet and fluffed. Some of the infected animals show yellow and roundish nodules with a diameter of 0,5 – 1,0 cm under the eyelids, the beak and mouth. Lesions under the wing, the nasal area and the mouth commissure usually appear after a period of 10 – 12 days. These symptoms are usually divided into two main forms. The skin and mucous progression. Some experts even suggest a division into up to 5 different categories.

The animal will generally recover from the infection within 6 weeks and the virus is only on very rare occasions lethal.

== Diagnosis ==
Most pigeons are diagnosed with pigeon pox due to obvious clinical signs, such as lesions on the featherless parts of their body. With that also comes the difficulty of breathing as well as tiredness and sometimes problems in swallowing.

To further validate the diagnosis a histological examination of a biopsy or the evaluation of vesicles liquid under an electronic microscope is used. However, a definite diagnosis can only be provided by the proof of the Pigeon Pox virus.

== Treatment and prevention ==
A treatment is not possible or known and scientifically proven, but vitamin A and antibacterial substances have shown, that they can help in the prevention of the occurrence of secondary infections. It is recommended to remove bloody ulcers if they are present. The nodules should not be treated surgically or manually to prevent possible infections during the healing period.

Therefore, a vaccination with an attenuated vaccine such as a prophylaxis is used. Using the wing-web-method the vaccine is injected intramuscularly. This form of preventive healthcare is mostly used in healthy animals when a breakout of the illness occurs in other animals in the surrounding area.

== Epidemiology ==
The virus has a worldwide frequent incidence in all free-living pigeon species and breeds, and urban pigeons.
