= Streptomyces wedmorensis =

Scientific classification
- Domain: Bacteria
- Kingdom: Bacillati
- Phylum: Actinomycetota
- Class: Actinomycetes
- Order: Streptomycetales
- Family: Streptomycetaceae
- Genus: Streptomyces
- Species: S. wedmorensis

Binomial name
- Streptomyces wedmorensis Preobrazhenskaya 1986

Type strain
- ATCC 21239, BCRC 12667, CBS 642.71, CCRC 12667, CECT 3245, CGMCC 4.1937, DSM 41676, DSMZ 41676, ICMP 12544, IFO 14062, JCM 4937, KCC S-0937, KY 2354, MA-3269, Merck and Co. Inc. MA-3269, NBIMCC 1655, NBRC 14062, NRRL 3246, NRRL 3426, NRRL B-3426, VKM Ac-1861

Synonyms
- Actinomyces wedmorensis

Species of bacterium

Streptomyces wedmorensis is a bacterium species from the genus of Streptomyces which has been isolated from soil in Pennsylvania in the United States. Streptomyces wedmorensis produces (S)-2-hydroxypropylphosphonic acid epoxidase, fosfomycin and phosphonomycin B.

== See also ==
- List of Streptomyces species
