= Sagrario Mochales =

Spanish researcher and microbiologist

Sagrario Mochales del Val
- Occupations: Microbiologist; Researcher
- Known for: Discovery and patenting of Fosfomycin

Sagrario Mochales del Val is a Spanish researcher and microbiologist, known for her work in the investigation of antibiotics. She was involved in screening natural products to discover various active principles, such as the broad-spectrum antibiotic Fosfomycin, widely used in the treatment of urinary tract infections and other ailments. She also contributed to the discovery of Lovastatin, used in treating hypercholesterolemia to reduce cholesterol levels and prevent related diseases.

She is known due to her involvement in the discovery and patenting of Fosfomycin.

== Career ==
Mochales studied biology at the Complutense University of Madrid and specialized in biochemistry, clinical microbiology, and molecular biology. Initially not considering including her name among the participating scientists in the patent, her American research colleague from Merck Research, David Heindlin, insisted, resulting in her name appearing in both the application and the patent granted in 1972.

She was part of the research team at the Spanish Company of Penicillin and Antibiotics (CEPA) starting in 1954, collaborating with the laboratory of the American pharmaceutical company Merck Research in Rahway, New Jersey. The CEPA team collected soil and water samples throughout Spain in search of new therapeutic substances. In 1966, another team member, Dr. Sebastián Hernández, collected soil samples on a trip from Jávea to Gata de Gorgos (Alicante). Mochales cultivated various organisms found in the sample and discovered the Streptomyces fradiae strain, exhibiting considerable microbial activity. After standardization and controls, the sample was sent to the United States, where Merck conducted the necessary clinical studies to develop the new antibiotic, Fosfomycin.

In 1969, an article presenting the new antibiotic was published in the journal Science. The study was signed by her American research colleagues from Merck, along with her CEPA colleagues Hernández and Mata, with Mochales listed last.

The discovery of Fosfomycin was patented in both the United States and Spain and marketed under the trade name Monurol. For decades, Monurol has been a primary antibiotic for treating urinary tract infections and various other conditions.

Mochales also collaborated in the 1970s in discovering medications to reduce high cholesterol levels and prevent related diseases. Her research led to the discovery of the compound in Lovastatin through the study of the fungus Aspergillus terreos. In collaboration with Merck, the final product was developed in the United States, marketed as Mevacor, the first statin on the market. Mevacor was the precursor to Zocor (simvastatin), one of Merck's best-selling drugs in its history.

In the 1980s, the CEPA laboratory transformed into a research center, the Basic Research Center of Spain (CIBE), under Merck's control. In 1989, Sagrario Mochales was appointed director of CIBE. Her scientific career was linked to Merck, Sharp & Dohme for over forty-five years.

Besides her fundamental contribution to the development of Fosfomycin and Lovastatin, she collaborated with other scientists in various studies and patents involving new microorganisms and antibacterial agents, predominantly in the area of antibiotics and antifungals.

== Recognition ==
She is an honorary member of the Spanish Society of Chemotherapy.
