= Mycoredoxin =

Class of enzymes

Identifiers
- EC no.: 1.20.4.3

Databases
- IntEnz: IntEnz view
- BRENDA: BRENDA entry
- ExPASy: NiceZyme view
- KEGG: KEGG entry
- MetaCyc: metabolic pathway
- PRIAM: profile
- PDB structures: RCSB PDB PDBe PDBsum
Search
- PMC: articles
- PubMed: articles
- NCBI: proteins

Mycoredoxin (EC 1.20.4.3, Mrx1, MrxI) is an enzyme with systematic name arseno-mycothiol:mycoredoxin oxidoreductase. This enzyme catalyses the following chemical reaction

arseno-mycothiol + mycoredoxin $\rightleftharpoons$ arsenite + mycothiol-mycoredoxin disulfide

Reduction of arsenate is part of a defense mechanism of the cell against toxic arsenate.
