= Fosfomycin/tobramycin =

Combination drug

Fosfomycin/tobramycin (FTI)
Combination of
- Fosfomycin: Phosphonic acid
- Tobramycin: Aminoglycoside

Clinical data
- Routes of administration: Inhalation

Fosfomycin/tobramycin is a formulation of fosfomycin and tobramycin. Fosfomycin is a phosphonic acid antibiotic active against gram-positive and gram-negative. Tobramycin is an aminoglycoside with gram-negative activity. It is an inhaled medication targeting those with cystic fibrosis and is currently being studied by Gilead Sciences the United States Food and Drug Administration and the NIH General Clinical Research Center.
