= MSHD =

MSHD may refer to:

- Mycothiol synthase, an enzyme
- Michigan Department of Transportation
