= Airsacculitis =

Inflammatory disease of air sacs in birds

- Other names: Air sacculitis, aerosacculitis, air sac disease, air sac infection, air sac syndrome, sac disease
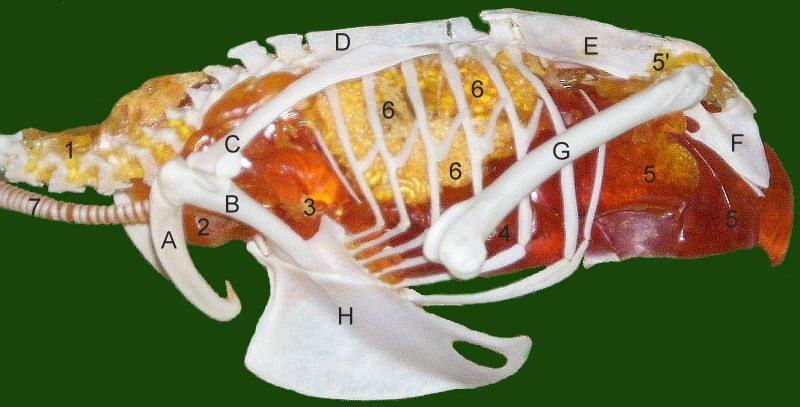
- Airsacs as shown in common kestrel (Falco tinnunculus): 1. cervical air sac, 2. clavicular air sac, 3. cranial thoracal air sac, 4. caudal thoracal air sac, 5. abdominal air sac (5' diverticels into pelvic girdle), 6. lung, 7. trachea
- Specialty: Veterinary medicine
- Symptoms: Swelling of the neck, difficult breathing, coughing, loss of appetite, loss of weight, watery eyes, nasal discharge, lethargy, ruffled feathers, clogged nares, stunted growth in juveniles, fewer eggs in hens
- Usual onset: Between 6 and 12 weeks of age
- Causes: Bacterial, fungal or viral inflammatory disease
- Differential diagnosis: Rhinitis, avian infectious bronchitis, gapeworm infection, chronic respiratory disease
- Treatment: Pharmacotherapy, symptomatic treatment
- Medication: Antibiotics
- Frequency: Common

Airsacculitis, also known as air sacculitis, aerosacculitis, air sac disease, air sac infection, air sac syndrome and simply sac disease, is a common inflammatory condition of air sacs that occurs in birds and is caused by various microbial (mostly bacterial) taxa. Having multiple different causative agents, the condition is widely distributed around the world.

Since the disease is highly infectious, it is especially dangerous for domesticated birds (poultry) bred on big farms. Occurrence of airsacculitis in big flocks can mean high economic loss, as infected poultry needs to be carefully observed, with all of the infected tissue disposed of and not used for human food. In severe cases of the disease whole infected bird carcasses need to be disposed.

Usually the disease affects younger birds, aged between 6 and 12 weeks. The most characteristic sign of airsacculitis is an inflamed mucous membrane of bird air sacs, which swells and becomes red, with infected birds exhibiting different symptoms, such as coughing, lethargy, swelling of the neck, difficult breathing, appetite and weight loss etc.

The same term is used for bacterial infection and subsequent inflammation of laryngeal air sacs in non-human primates.

== In birds ==
=== Anatomical background ===
The respiratory system of birds differs significantly from that found in mammals. Birds have relatively small lungs that are rigid and not contractile like those of mammals, in which lungs expand and contract during the breathing cycle. Another critical difference is the absence of so-called air sacs in mammals. Such structures help birds to regulate air flow through their respiratory system. Birds also lack the diaphragm.

Birds have so-called air sacs, which help them to regulate the constant flowing of air through their respiratory system.

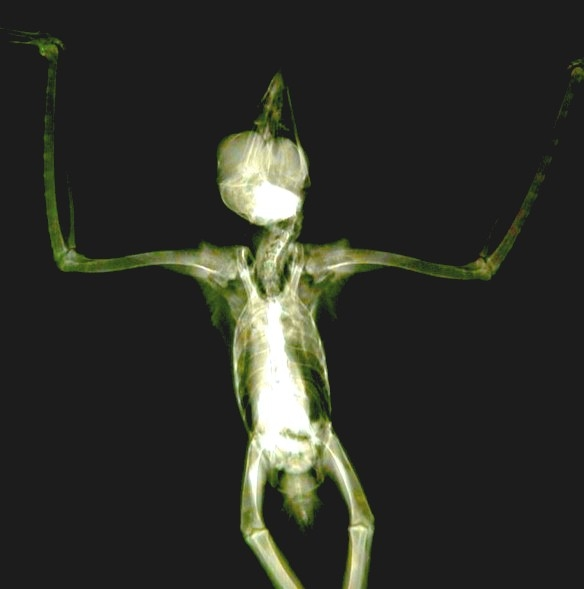
X-ray of a bird with air sacs being visible.

=== Signs and symptoms ===
Airsacculitis is an inflammatory condition, that appears as a consequence of infection with various species of microbes, mostly bacteria. The condition itself resembles mammal bronchitis and pneumonia, even though different body parts are infected and inflamed.

In a few cases the condition is asymptomatic. Infected birds usually appear sick; lower part of their neck can swell and animals experience difficulties breathing. They may cough, lose their appetite and subsequently their weight, often exhibit nasal discharge, apparent clogged nares, ruffled feathers, have watery eyes and appear lethargic. Affected adult females (hens) lay fewer eggs, while juveniles exhibit stunted growth.

When doing an autopsy congestion of air sacs, throat and nares is evident. Air sacs are red, swollen and produce a lot of liquid.

=== Cause ===
The cause of airsacculitis is a bacterial infection of air sacs. The common disease causative agents are species, such as pathogenic Escherichia coli, Mycoplasma gallisepticum (MG), Mycoplasma synoviae (MS), Mycoplasma meleagridis (MM), Ornithobacterium rhinotracheale (ORT) and Bordetella avium. Airsacculitis can also be caused by other microbes, such as fungi and in rare cases even viruses. Only rarely airsacculitis is a consequence of improper vaccine or its administration.

This disease is highly infectious in birds, but the infectivity is dependent on the causative agent itself. Specific bacteria species (particularly E. coli), causing the airsacculitis in birds, can be transmitted to people. In some cases this disease can be latent, meaning bacteria remain dormant in survivors and potentially attack non-infected birds after a while.

=== Diagnosis and treatment ===
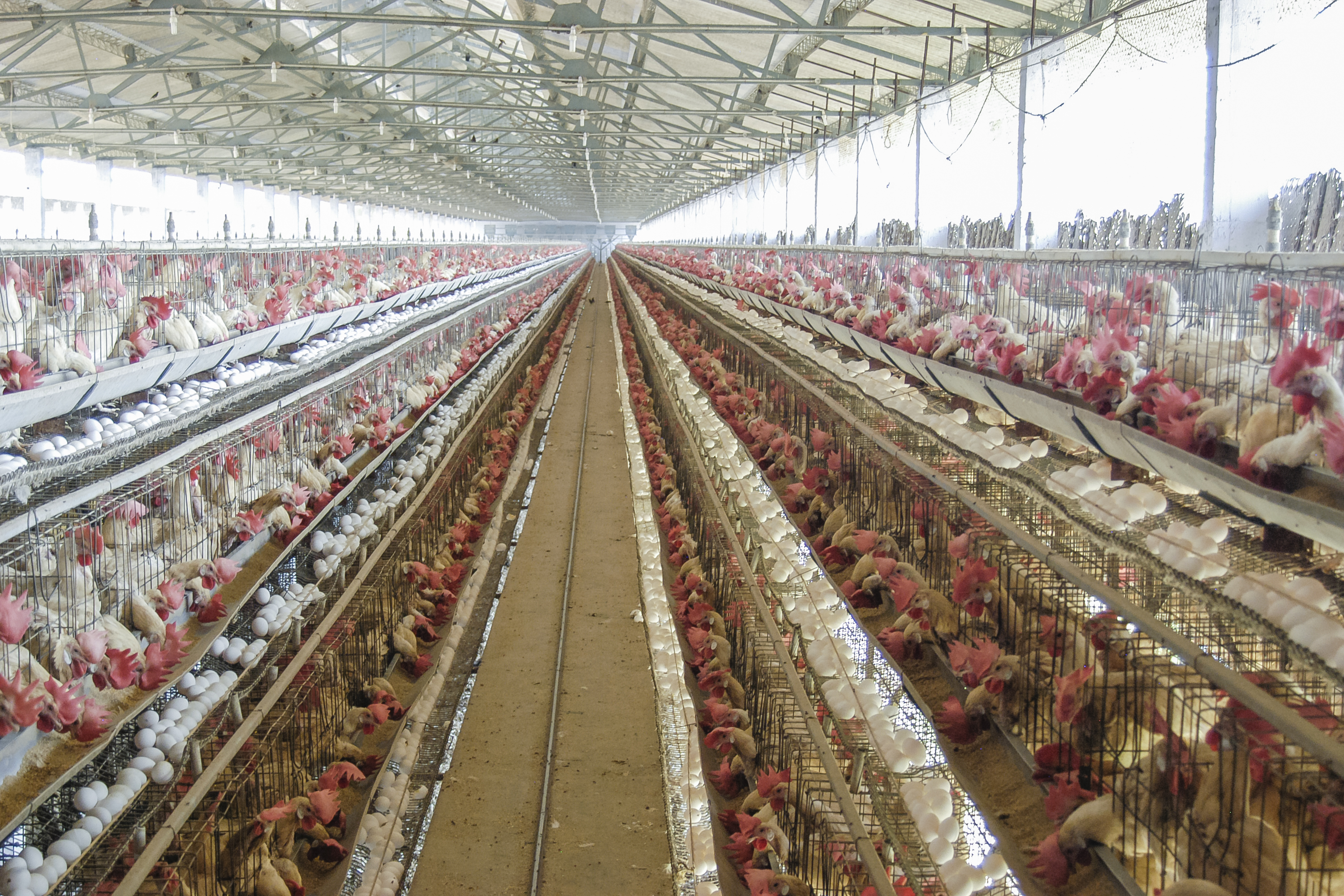
The occurrence of airsacculitis on big poultry farms usually means the loss of some percentage of birds.

Typical symptoms should be observed. The disease can be diagnosed with a help of radiography and endoscopy. After a close inspection (e.g. an air sac biopsy) veterinarians usually prescribe antibiotics for the exact infectious agent. It is also important to diagnose any additional (comorbid) diseases. Abscess and granuloma can be removed surgically.

To prevent the disease poultry should be kept in dry and warm (not chilled or over-heated) conditions, with appropriate sanitation, source of clean water and an access to enough fresh air (ventilation).

=== Prognosis ===
Prognosis is usually favorable, with poultry experiencing moderate pain for some time. It has been reported that commonly about 2/3 of infected birds recover after exhibiting symptoms for some time. Prompt care increases the likelihood of survival. In specific birds unwanted feather-plucking can occur as a consequence of infection and inflammation.

=== Differential diagnosis ===
Some other diseases that affect bird's respiratory system and have similar signs are rhinitis (coryza), avian infectious bronchitis (IB), infection of trachea with a gapeworm and chronic respiratory disease (CRD). Among other diseases associated with the onset of airsacculitis are also avian chlamydiosis (AC), newcastle disease (ND), aspergillosis and ornithobacteriosis.

== In primates ==
=== Disease and pathology ===
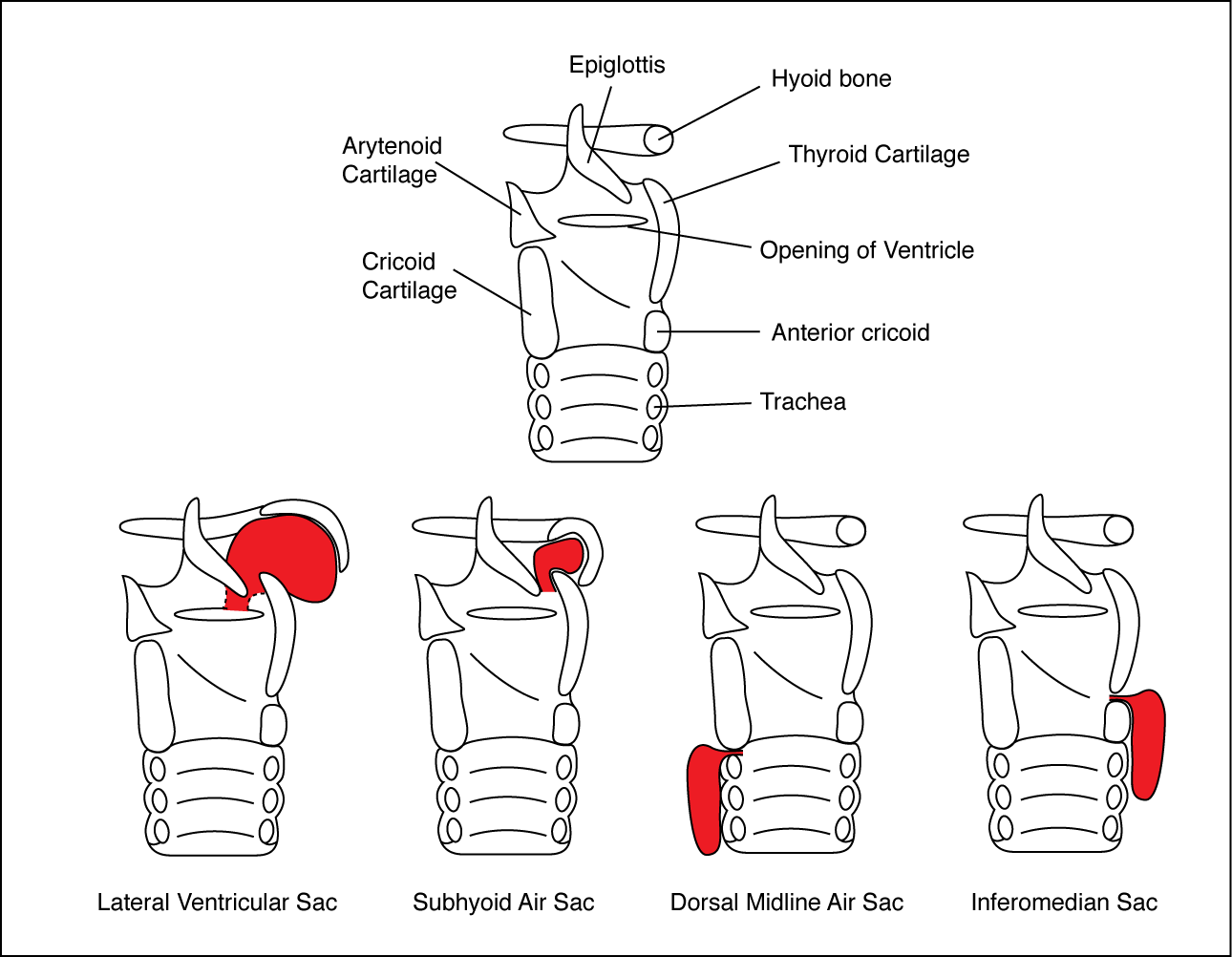
Shematic representation of laryngeal air sacs in non-human primates.

Sometimes, the term airsacculitis is used for bacterial infection of the laryngeal air sacs in mammals, the most commonly primates. Such airsacculitis in non-human primates often leads to various chronic respiratory diseases. The infected air sacs thicken. Under the microscope one can detect hyperplasia or hypertrophy of epithelium, cell necrosis, fibrosis, cellular infiltrates, as well as an occurrence of bacterial colonies. Among typical symptoms of the disease are halitosis (bad breath), coughing, rhinorrhea (nasal discharge), depression, anorexia and weight loss.

=== Anatomy and function ===
It is critically important to note, that laryngeal air sac is not a synonym of pulmonary alveolus (sometimes also called an air sac), which represents the end of the bronchiole and serves as an exchanging agent of gases between lungs and blood. Infected lungs and inflamed lung tissue (with alveoli) is a sign of pneumonia and not airsacculitis.

In primates laryngeal air sacs occur in apes and gibbons, while such structures are absent in people and some smaller gibbon species. These air sacs are useful when producing fast and extended call sequences. Such behaviour often leads to the risk of hyperventilation if there are no air sacs to allow re-breathing of an exhaled air.

Researchers proposed the absence of laryngeal air sacs in humans is a result of people's ability to adjust their speech breathing patterns and consequently lower probability of hyperventilation. It is thought that the lack of laryngeal air sacs in humans represents a derived feature.

== See also ==
- Air sac
- Bird anatomy#Respiratory system
