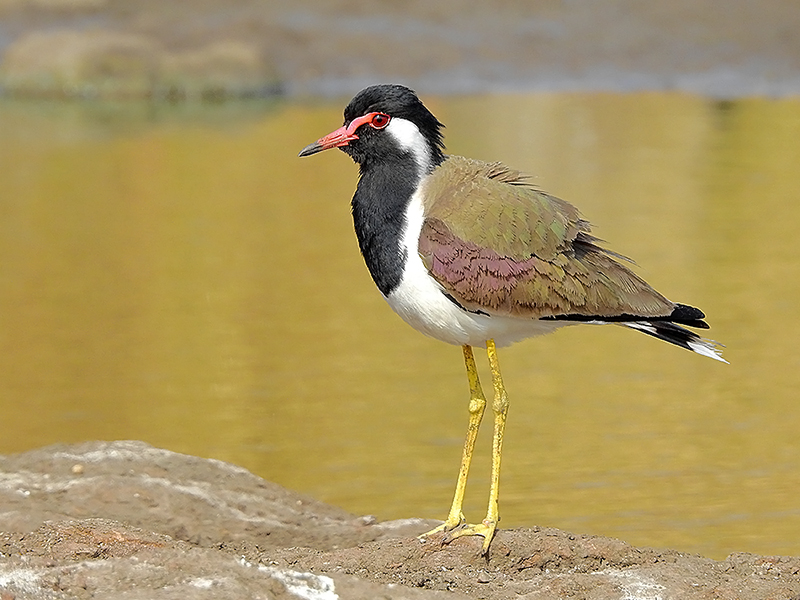
- Vanellus indicus indicus Calls

Conservation status
- Least Concern (IUCN 3.1)

Scientific classification
- Kingdom: Animalia
- Phylum: Chordata
- Class: Aves
- Order: Charadriiformes
- Family: Charadriidae
- Genus: Vanellus
- Species: V. indicus

Binomial name
- Vanellus indicus (Boddaert, 1783)
- Bounding distribution range

Synonyms
- Hoplopterus indicus Lobivanellus indicus Lobivanellus goensis Tringa indica Sarcogrammus indicus

= Red-wattled lapwing =

Species of bird

The red-wattled lapwing (Vanellus indicus) is an Asian lapwing or large plover, a wader in the family Charadriidae. Like other lapwings they are ground birds that are incapable of perching. Their characteristic loud alarm calls are indicators of human or animal movements and the sounds have been variously rendered as did he do it or pity to do it leading to the colloquial name of did-he-do-it bird. Usually seen in pairs or small groups not far from water, they sometimes form large aggregations in the non-breeding season (winter). They nest in a ground scrape laying three to four camouflaged eggs. Adults near the nest fly around, diving at potential predators while calling noisily. The cryptically patterned chicks hatch and immediately follow their parents to feed, hiding by lying low on the ground or in the grass when threatened.

== Taxonomy ==
Traditionally well known to native hunters, the red-wattled lapwing was first described in a book by the French polymath Georges-Louis Leclerc, Comte de Buffon in his Histoire Naturelle des Oiseaux in 1781. The bird was also illustrated in a hand-coloured plate engraved by François-Nicolas Martinet in the Planches Enluminées D'Histoire Naturelle produced under the supervision of Edme-Louis Daubenton to accompany Buffon's text. Neither the plate nor Buffon's description included a scientific name but in 1783 the Dutch naturalist Pieter Boddaert used the binomial name Tringa indica in his catalogue of the Planches Enluminées. The type locality is Goa in western India. It was subsequently placed in various other genera such as Sarcogrammus and Lobivanellus before being merged into Vanellus which was erected by the French zoologist Mathurin Jacques Brisson in 1760. Vanellus is the Medieval Latin for a "lapwing". It is a diminutive of the Latin vanus meaning "winnowing" or "fan". The specific epithet indicus is the Latin for "India".

Across their wide range there are slight differences in the plumage and there are four recognized subspecies:

- V. i. aigneri (Laubmann, 1913) – southeast Turkey to Pakistan
- V. i. indicus (Boddaert, 1783) – central Pakistan to Nepal, northeast India and Bangladesh
- V. i. lankae (Koelz, 1939) – Sri Lanka
- V. i. atronuchalis (Jerdon, 1864) – northeast India to south China, southeast Asia, Malay Peninsula and north Sumatra
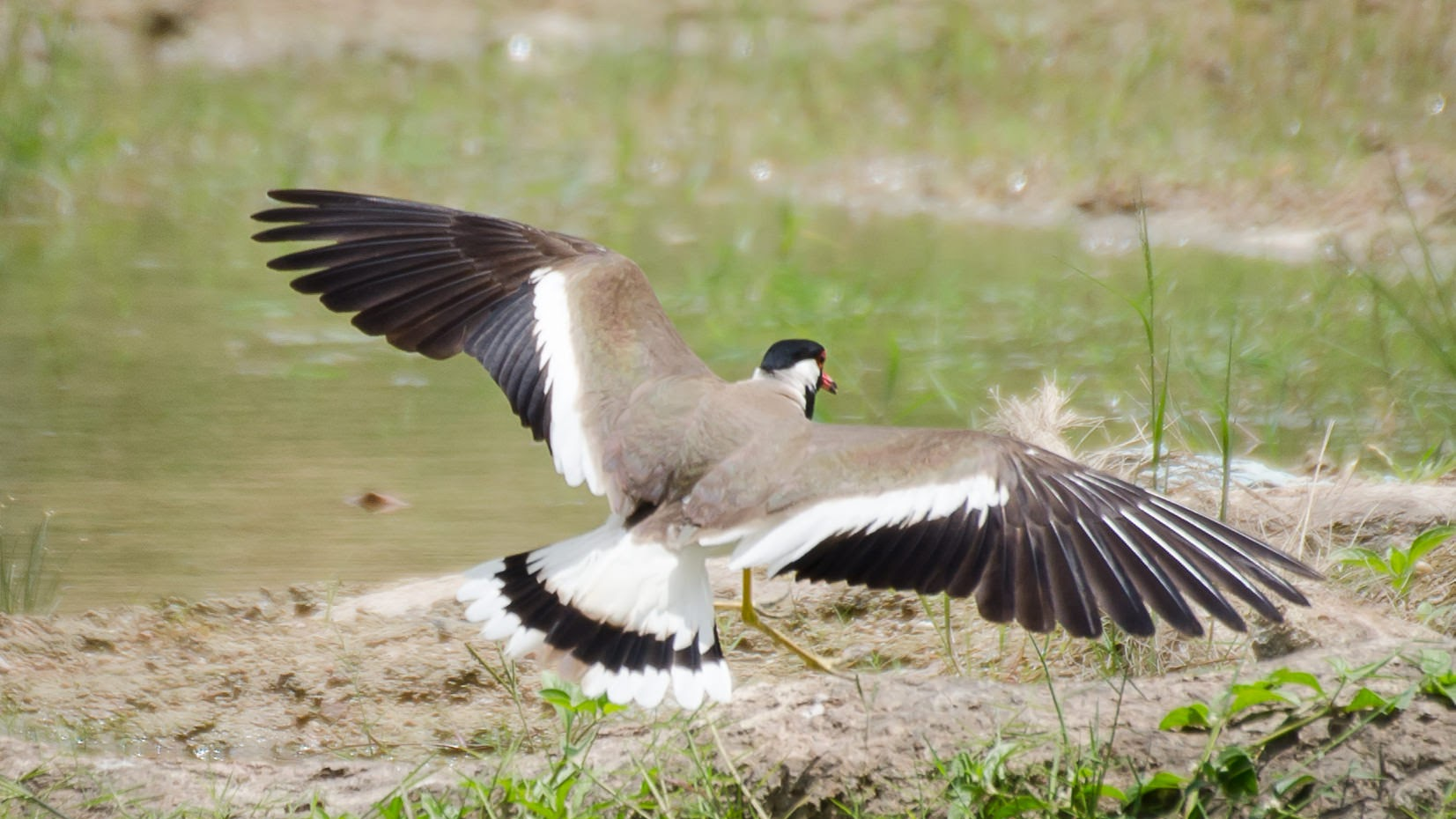
V. i. indicus
showing the diagnostic white wing bar and a broad black band on the white tail

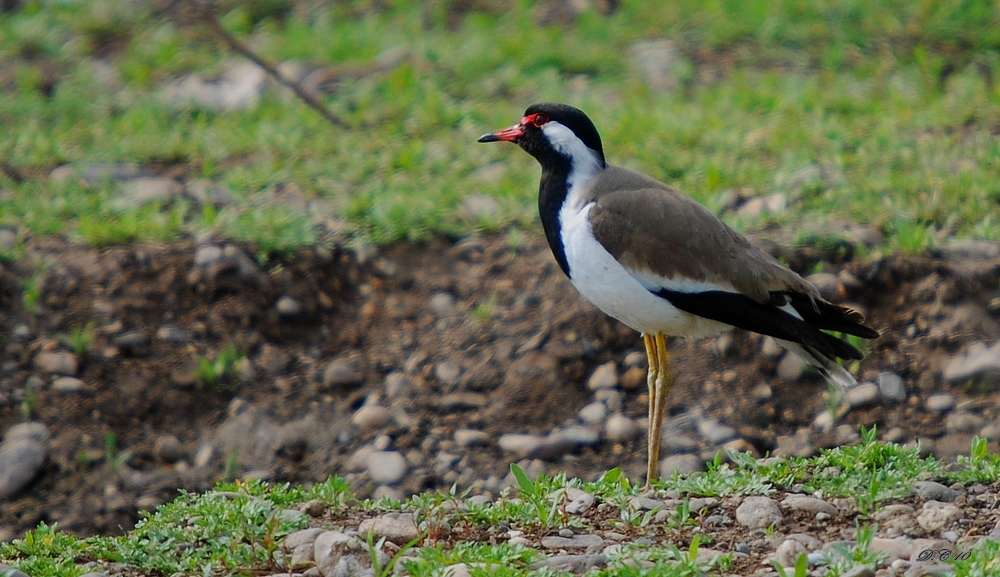
V. i. aigneri
Turkey

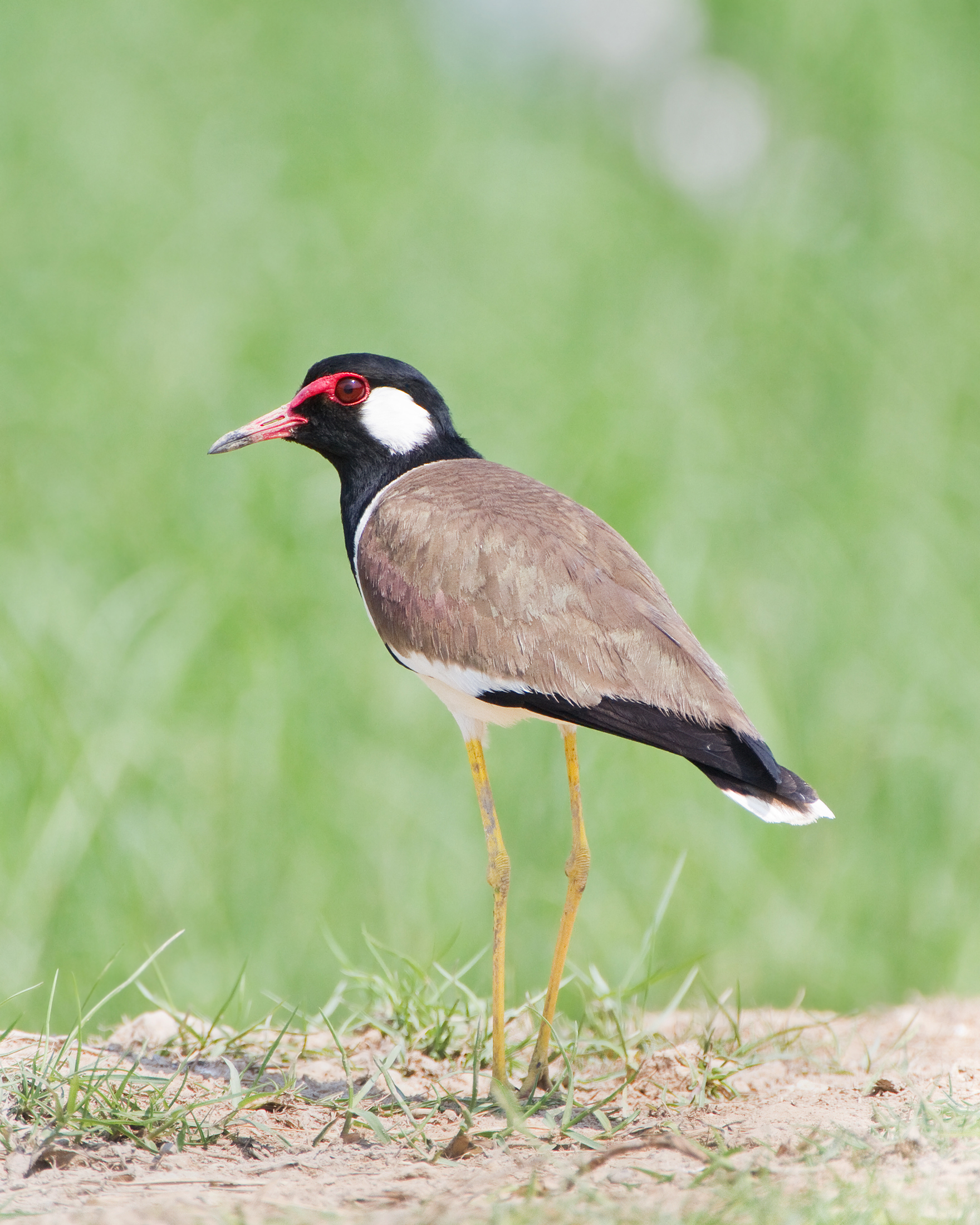
V. i. atronuchalis showing the white ear patch bounded by black, Thailand

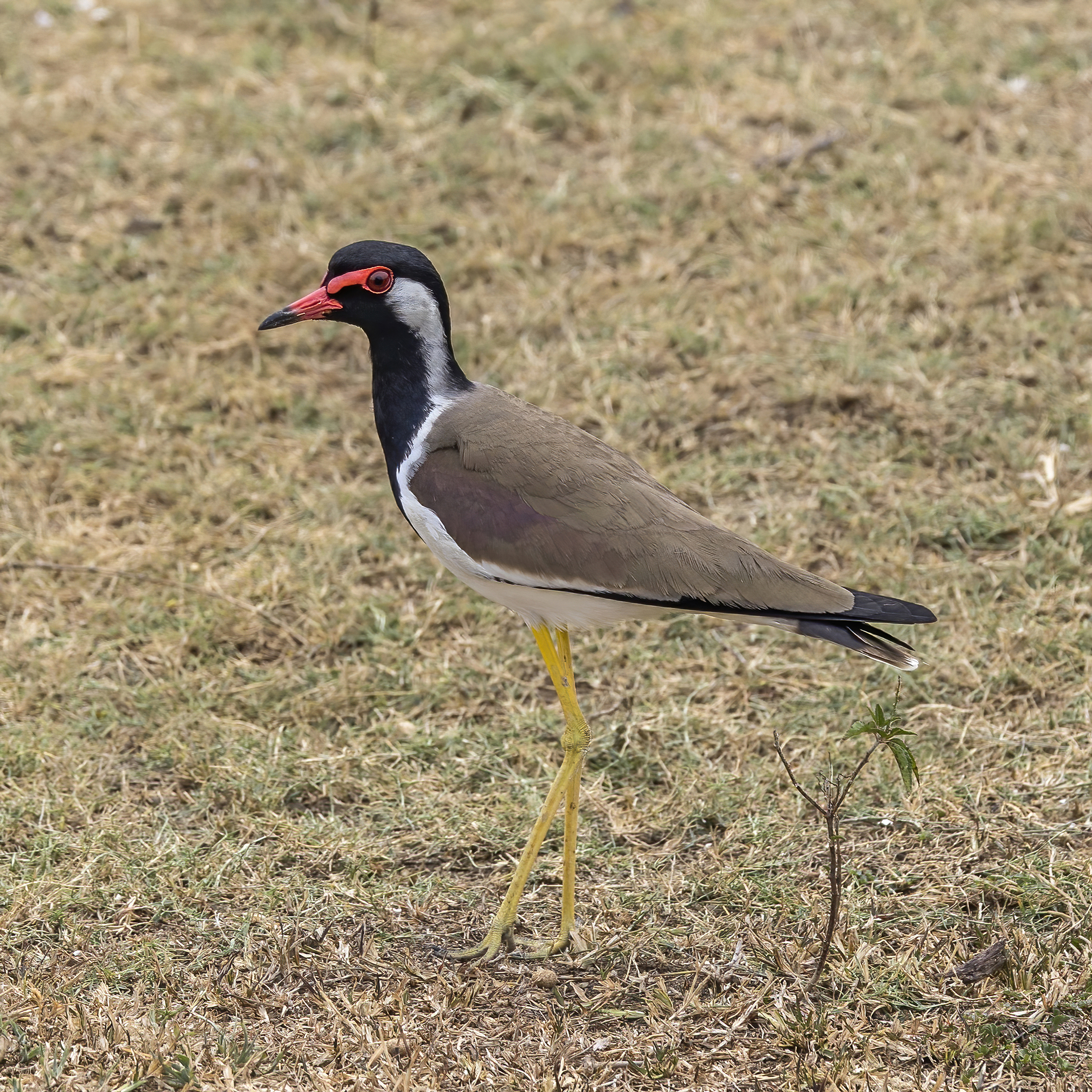
V. i. lankae
Sri Lanka

== Description ==
Red-wattled lapwings are large waders, about 35 cm (14 in) long. The wings and back are light brown with a purple to green sheen, but the head, a bib on the front and back of the neck are black. Prominently white patch runs between these two colours, from belly and tail, flanking the neck to the sides of crown. Short tail is tipped black. A red fleshy wattle in front of each eye, black-tipped red bill, and the long legs are yellow. In flight, prominent white wing bars formed by the white on the secondary coverts.

Race aigneri is slightly paler and larger than the nominate race and is found in Turkey, Iran, Iraq, Afghanistan and the Indus valley. The nominate race is found all over India. The Sri Lankan race lankae is smaller and dark while atronuchalis the race in north-eastern India and eastern Bangladesh has a white cheek surrounded by black.

Males and females are similar in plumage but males have a 5% longer wing and tend to have a longer carpal spur. The length of the birds is 320–350 mm, wing of 208–247 mm with the nominate averaging 223 mm, Sri Lanka 217 mm. The Bill is 31–36 mm and tarsus of 70–83 mm. Tail length is 104–128 mm.

It usually keeps in pairs or trios in well-watered open country, ploughed fields, grazing land, and margins and dry beds of tanks and puddles. They occasionally form large flocks, ranging from 26 to 200 birds. It is also found in forest clearings around rain-filled depressions. It runs about in short spurts and dips forward obliquely (with unflexed legs) to pick up food in a typical plover manner. They are said to feed at night being especially active around the full moon. It is vigilant both by day and night, and its alarm on detecting intrusions was considered a nuisance by hunters. Flight rather slow, with deliberate flaps, but capable of remarkable agility when defending nest or being hunted by a hawk.

Its striking appearance is supplemented by its noisy nature, with a loud and scolding did-he-do-it call, uttered both in the day and night.

Leucistic abnormal plumages have been noted.

The local names are mainly onomatopoeic in origin and include titahri (Hindi), titawi (Marathi), tittibha (Kannada), tateehar (Sindhi), titodi (Gujarati), hatatut (Kashmiri), balighora (Assamese), yennappa chitawa (Telugu), aal-kaati (Tamil, meaning "human indicator").

== Distribution ==
It breeds from West Asia (Iraq, SW Iran, Persian Gulf) eastwards across South Asia (Baluchistan, Sri Lanka, Afghanistan, Pakistan, the entire Indian subcontinent up to Kanyakumari and up to 1800m in Kashmir/Nepal), with another sub-species further east in Southeast Asia. May migrate altitudinally in spring and autumn (e.g. in N. Baluchistan or NW Pakistan), and spreads out widely in the monsoons on creation of requisite habitats, but by and large the populations are resident.

This species is declining in its western range, but is abundant in much of South Asia, being seen at almost any wetland habitat in its range.

== Behaviour and ecology ==
The breeding season is mainly March to August. The courtship involves the male puffing its feathers and pointing its beak upwards. The male then shuffles around the female. Several males may display to females and they may be close together. The eggs are laid in a ground scrape or depression sometimes fringed with pebbles, goat or hare droppings. About 3–4 black-blotched buff eggs shaped a bit like a peg-top (pyriform), 42x30 mm on average. Nests are difficult to find since the eggs are cryptically coloured and usually matches the ground pattern. In residential areas, they sometimes take to nesting on roof-tops. They have been recorded nesting on the stones between the rails of a railway track, the adult leaving the nest when trains passed. Nests that have been threatened by agricultural operations have been manually translocated by gradually shifting the eggs. When nesting they will attempt to dive bomb or distract potential predators. Both the male and female incubate the eggs and divert predators using distraction displays or flash their wings to deter any herbivores that threaten the nest. Males appear to relieve females incubating at the nest particularly towards the hot part of noon. The eggs hatch in 28 to 30 days. The reproductive success is about 40%. Egg mortality is high (~43%) due to predation by mongooses, crows and kites. Chicks have a lower mortality (8.3%) and their survival improves after the first week.

Like other lapwings, they soak their belly feathers to provide water to their chicks as well as to cool the eggs during hot weather.

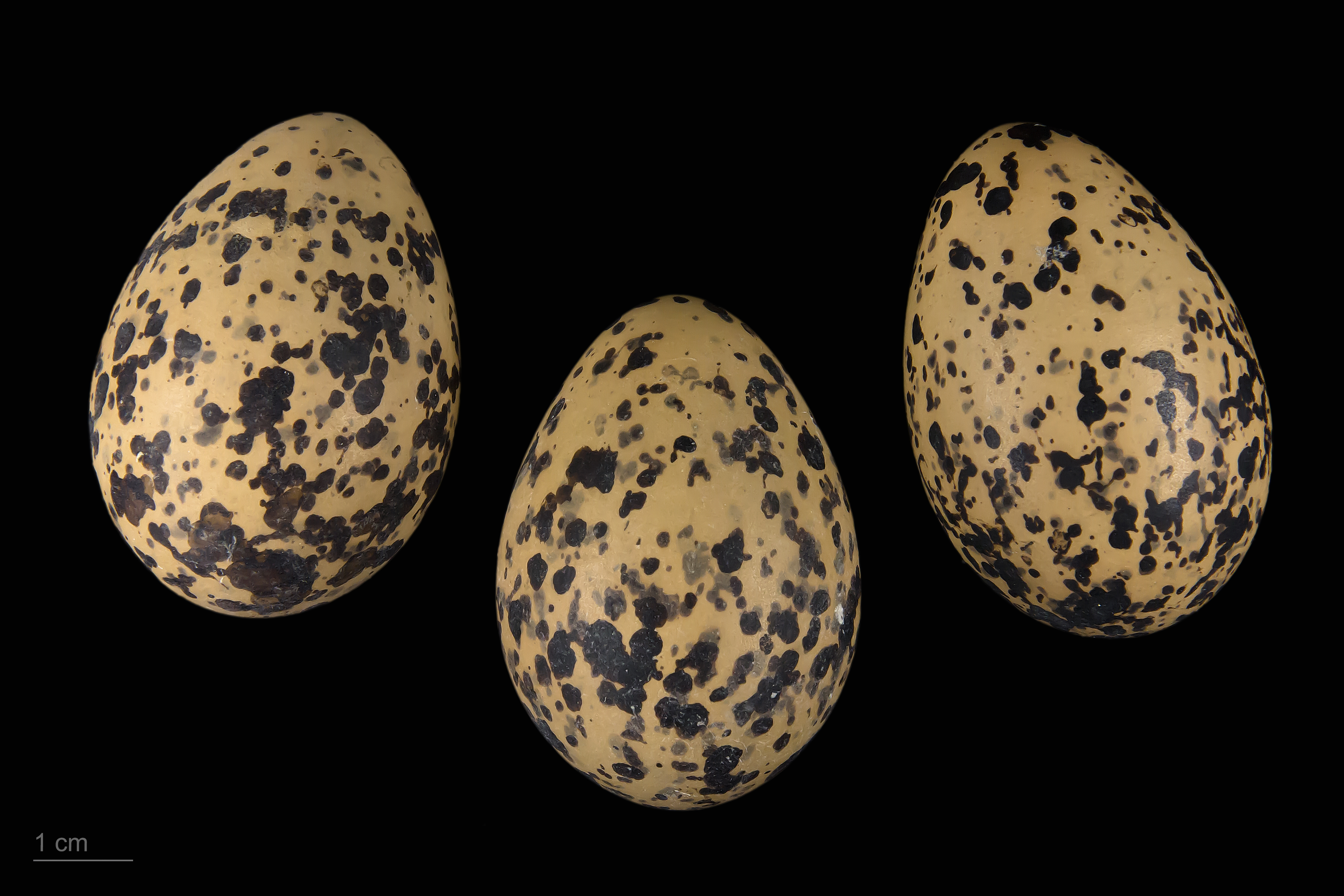
V. i. aigneri eggs from MHNT

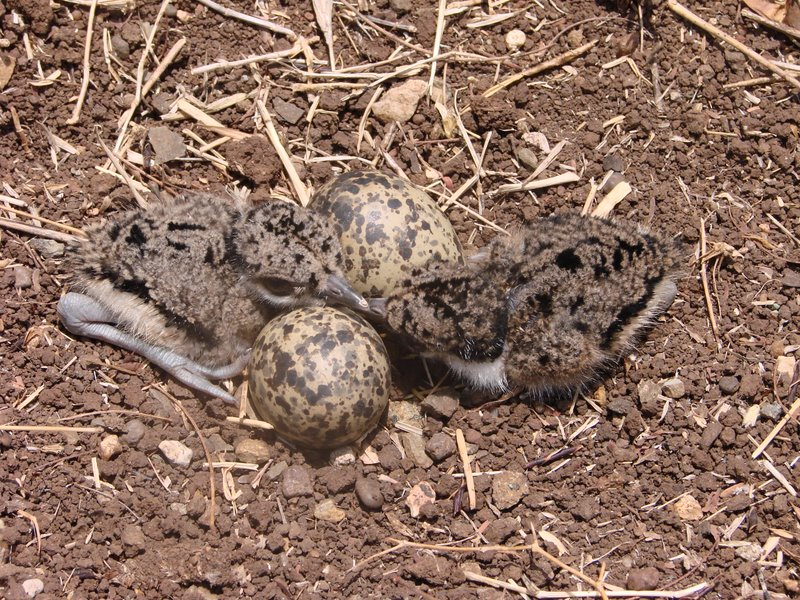
Chicks and eggs on a scrape nest. The young hatch in synchrony and the cryptically plumaged chick typically lies still when alarmed.

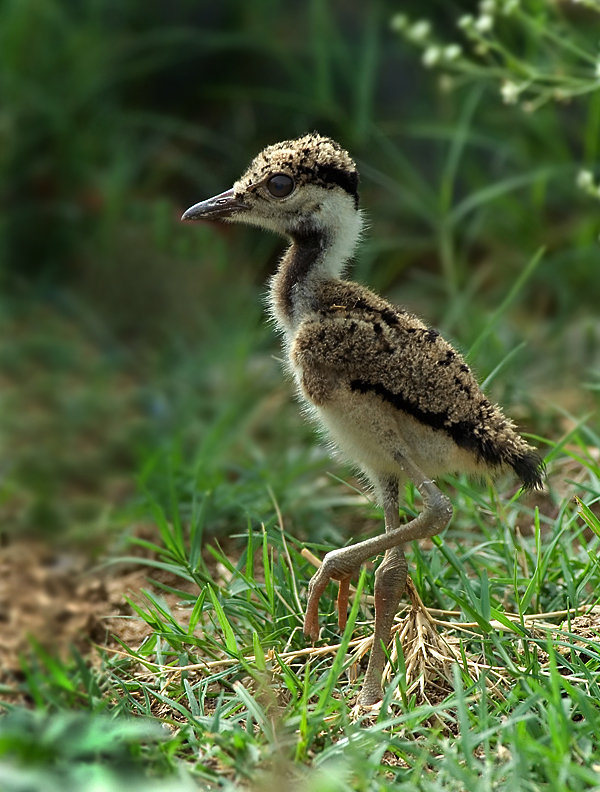
The chick leaves the nest and follows the parents soon after hatching

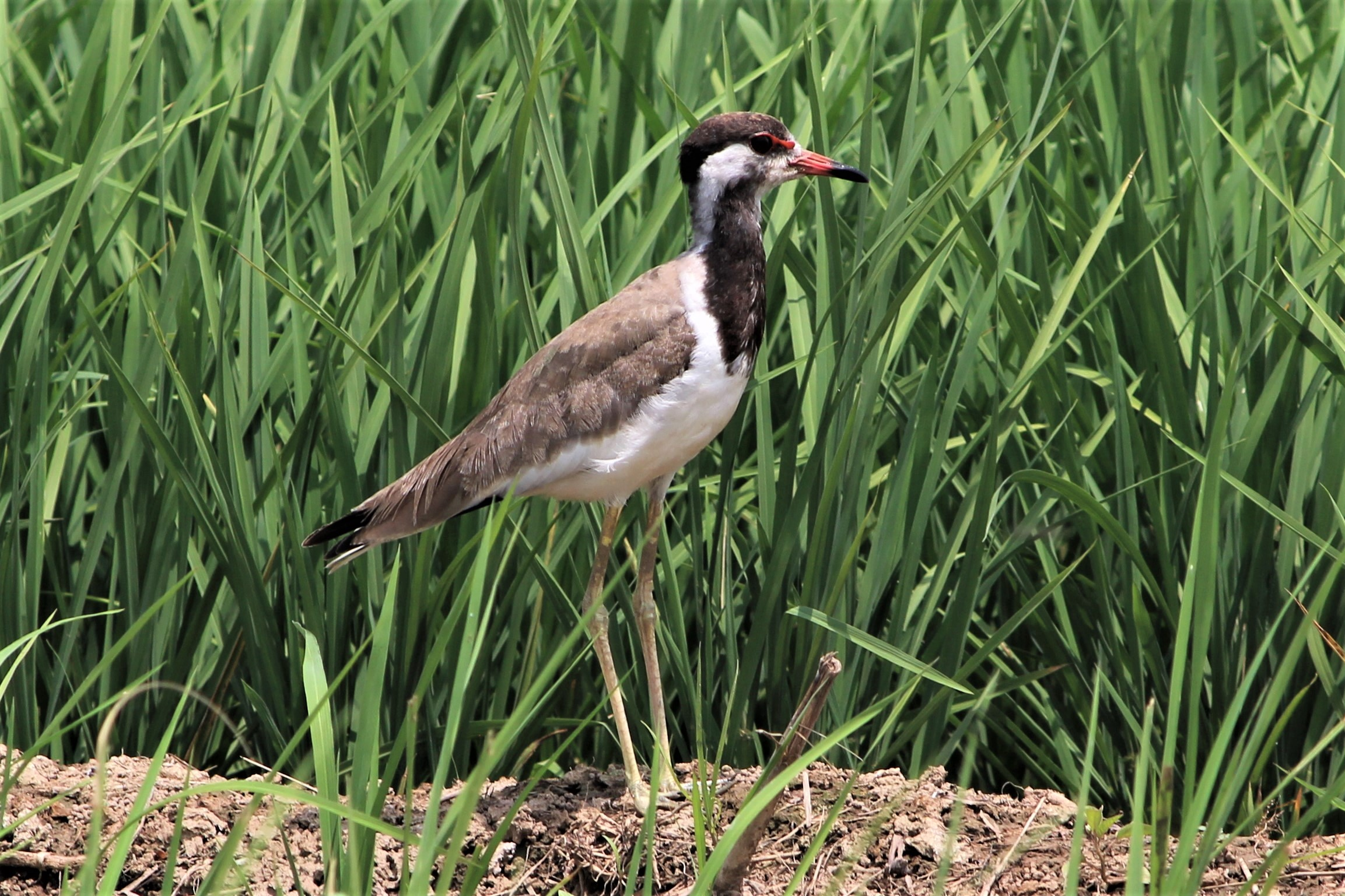
A juvenile

They bathe in pools of water when available and will often spend time on preening when leaving the nest or after copulation. They sometimes rest on the ground with the tarsi laid flat on the ground and at other times may rest on one leg.

Healthy adult birds have few predators and are capable of rapid and agile flight when pursued by hawks or falcons. Hugh B. Cott claimed that the flesh of the bird was unpalatable based on evidence from an Indian geologist who noted that a hungry tiger cub refused to eat their meat. Some endoparasitic tapeworms, nematodes, and trematodes have been described from the species. Mortality caused by respiratory infection by Ornithobacterium rhinotracheale has been recorded in captive birds in Pakistan.

=== Diet ===
The diet of the lapwing includes a range of insects, snails and other invertebrates, mostly picked from the ground. They may also feed on some grains. They feed mainly during the day but they may also feed at night. They may sometimes make use of the legs to disturb insect prey from soft soil.

== In culture ==
In parts of India, a local belief is that the bird sleeps on its back with the legs upwards and an associated Hindi metaphor Titahri se asman thama jayega ("can the lapwing support the heavens?") is used to refer to persons undertaking tasks beyond their ability or strength.

In parts of Rajasthan it is believed that the laying of eggs by the lapwing on high ground was an indication of good rains to come. The eggs are known to be collected by practitioners of folk medicine. The Bhils of Malwa believed that the laying of eggs by red-wattled lapwings in the dry beds of streams as forewarnings of delayed rains or droughts. Eggs laid on the banks on the other hand were taken as indications of normal rains.

== Other sources ==
- Anon. (1991) Flocking of Red Wattled Lapwings. Newsletter for Birdwatchers 31(5–6):1.
- Dharmakumarsinhji, RS (1965) Small displacement by ground nesting birds. Newsletter for Birdwatchers 5(9):10.
- Gay, Thomas (1975). "More about the nesting of the Red-wattled Lapwing". Newsletter for Birdwatchers. 15 (4): 9.
- Jamdar, Nitin (1985) Redwattled Lapwing (Vanellus indicus) suffering from cataract. Journal of the Bombay Natural History Society 82(1):197.
- Kalsi, RS; Khera, S (1986) Some observations on breeding and displacement behaviour of the Redwattled Lapwing Vanellus indicus indicus (Aves: Charadriidae). Res. Bull. Panjab Univ. 37:131–141.
- Khajuria, H (1972) Nestlings of the redwattled lapwing, Vanellus i. indicus (boddaert). Pavo 8(1&2):82–83.
- Koshy, MS (1989) Lapwings on a roof. Newsletter for Birdwatchers 29(7–8):7.
- Krishnan, M (1998) Ubiquitous alarmist. Blackbuck. 14(3&4):88–90.
- Jackson, P (1976) Redwattled Lapwing. Newsletter for Birdwatchers 16(3):11–12.
- Saxena, VS (1973) Unusual nesting by Redwattled Lapwing. Indian Forester 99:33–35.
