= Mycoplasma meleagridis =

Scientific classification
- Domain: Bacteria
- Kingdom: Bacillati
- Phylum: Mycoplasmatota
- Class: Mollicutes
- Order: Mycoplasmatales
- Family: Mycoplasmataceae
- Genus: Mycoplasma
- Species: M. meleagridis

Binomial name
- Mycoplasma meleagridis Yamamoto et al. 1965 (Approved Lists 1980)

Species of bacterium

Mycoplasma meleagridis is a small bacteria responsible for air sacculitis and disorders of the musculoskeletal and reproductive systems in turkeys. These symptoms are also known as Mycoplasma air sacculitis, Mycoplasma infectious stunting, and Mycoplasmosis.

The infection is more severe in young birds and occurs globally wherever turkeys are reared intensively. Transmission is mainly vertical via the egg but ticks such as the Ixodes species can also be vectors.

== Clinical signs and diagnosis ==
The infection is often subclinical but may appear as mild stunting.

Air sacculitis appears as tachypnoea, nasal discharge and sneezing.

Musculoskeletal problems can lead to lameness, swelling and crooked necks.

There may be a drop in egg production.

The bacteria can be cultured from tissue samples or swabs and identified with PCR or immunofluorescence.

ELISA and the Slide Agglutination Test are used for serological diagnosis.

== Treatment and control ==
Antibiotics are effective at treating and preventing the infection, especially Tylosin but also Lincomycin and Spectinomycin.

Vertical transmission is difficult to prevent, but males can be tested before breeding and eggs can be dipped in a Tylosin bath.
