= MSHA =

The acronym MSHA can refer to:

- Maryland State Highway Administration, an agency of the Maryland Department of Transportation.
- Master of Science in Healthcare Administration, a graduate degree
- Mine Safety and Health Administration, an agency of the United States Department of Labor
- D-inositol-3-phosphate glycosyltransferase, an enzyme
