= Arsenate-mycothiol transferase =

Identifiers
- EC no.: 2.8.4.2

Databases
- IntEnz: IntEnz view
- BRENDA: BRENDA entry
- ExPASy: NiceZyme view
- KEGG: KEGG entry
- MetaCyc: metabolic pathway
- PRIAM: profile
- PDB structures: RCSB PDB PDBe PDBsum
Search
- PMC: articles
- PubMed: articles
- NCBI: proteins

Arsenate-mycothiol transferase (EC 2.8.4.2, ArsC1, ArsC2, mycothiol:arsenate transferase) is an enzyme with systematic name mycothiol:arsenate S-arsenotransferase. This enzyme catalyses the following chemical reaction

mycothiol + arsenate $\rightleftharpoons$ arseno-mycothiol + H_{2}O

Reduction of arsenate is part of a defence mechanism of the cell against toxic arsenate.
