= HPPE =

HPPE may refer to:

- High performance polyethylene, used in cut-resistant gloves
  - Ultra-high-molecular-weight polyethylene (UHMWPE, UHMW) or high-modulus polyethylene (HMPE), a subset of the thermoplastic polyethylene
- (S)-2-hydroxypropylphosphonic acid epoxidase, an enzyme
