= MSHB =

MSHB may refer to:

- N-acetyl-1-D-myo-inositol-2-amino-2-deoxy-alpha-D-glucopyranoside deacetylase, an enzyme
- Maher Shalal Hash Baz (band), a Japanese composer and musician
