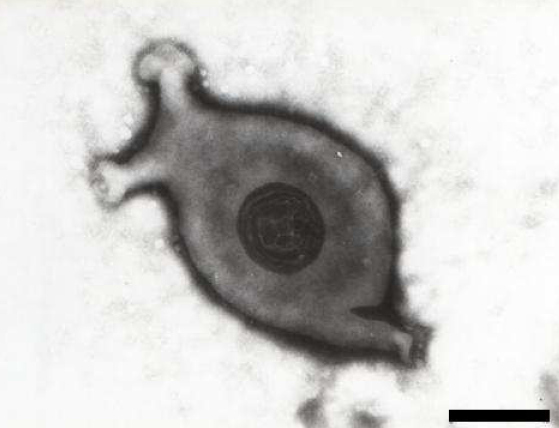
- Electron micrograph of Mycoplasma gallisepticum, scale bar 140 nm

Scientific classification
- Domain: Bacteria
- Kingdom: Bacillati
- Phylum: Mycoplasmatota
- Class: Mollicutes
- Order: Mycoplasmatales
- Family: Mycoplasmataceae
- Genus: Mycoplasma
- Species: M. gallisepticum

Binomial name
- Mycoplasma gallisepticum Edward and Kanarek 1960 (Approved Lists 1980)

= Mycoplasma gallisepticum =

Species of bacterium

Mycoplasma gallisepticum (MG) is a bacterium in the class Mollicutes and the family Mycoplasmataceae. It causes chronic respiratory disease (CRD) in chickens and infectious sinusitis in turkeys, chickens, game birds, pigeons, and passerine birds of all ages. Mycoplasma gallisepticum is a significant pathogen in poultry. The disease it causes can be controlled by rearing flocks free of the organism, or by vaccination, which is the most viable method in many parts of the world.

The ability of M. gallisepticum to cause chronic disease is attributable, in part, to its capacity to vary the expression of its major cell surface lipoprotein VlhA over the course of infection, thus evading the immune response of its host.

Mycoplasmosis is the disease caused by infection with mycoplasmas. Mycoplasmas have many defining characteristics. Mycoplasma lack cell walls, have highly variable surface proteins and a distinctive plasma membrane, and are the smallest self-replicating prokaryotes. Mycoplasmas can cause disease in humans, animals, insects, and plants. Mycoplasmas attach to host epithelial cells, such as in the respiratory tract, causing cell damage and an inflammatory response. There are currently over 100 species of mycoplasmas known. The following have been isolated from wild birds: Mycoplasma buteonis, Mycoplasma corogypsi, Mycoplasma falconis, Mycoplasma gypis, Mycoplasma sturni, and Mycoplasma gallisepticum. M. gallisepticum has the most significant effect on wild birds.

== History ==
The disease was first described in 1905. It was described as a respiratory disease that was found in domestic poultry. However, it wasn't for another 50 years that the causative agent, Mycoplasma gallisepticum, was cultivated.

In 1980, M. gallisepticum was isolated from wild turkeys in Colorado, Georgia and California. This was because of the mixture and close contact between the wild turkeys and domestic poultry during feeding time. This led to an increased awareness of the disease and health monitoring protocols in wild turkey restoration programs. These protocols are still being followed today by state wildlife agencies.

House finches were introduced into the eastern U.S. from California in the 1940s after being released from the pet trade that became illegal. House finches at the time were called Hollywood finches. In January 1994, the first house finches with symptoms of M. gallisepticum were observed in the Washington DC area, including part of Maryland and Virginia. In the winter of 1994, an epidemic of mycoplasmal conjunctivitis caused by M. gallisepticum began in house finches. In 1994, efforts were made across North America to collect data on the spread and prevalence of M. gallisepticum using the House Finch Disease Survey. A few years later the epidemic that started in the mid-Atlantic states spread to the entire eastern population of house finches.

Initially, the only house finches to have this disease were those introduced to the eastern United States. It has been suggested that those house finches were less resistant to the disease because they were introduced beginning with a small population, and were subsequently highly inbred. For a time, the disease appeared to be stopped by the Rocky Mountains, but was found in the Rockies by the early 2000s, and west of the range by 2006. After crossing the Rockies, the disease spread south along the west coast before turning back inland. Research using RFID tags to track a sample of wild finches found an individual bird's likelihood of acquiring or transmitting the infection to be positively correlated with time spent at feeders.

== Clinical signs ==
=== House finches ===
Mycoplasma gallisepticum infection in house finches (Haemorhous mexicanus) causes conjunctivitis with the symptoms of periocular swelling, swollen eyelids, ocular and nasal discharge, impaired vision, depression, and weight loss. Infected birds may be listless or seem disoriented, present with reckless or limited flight, and a timid reluctance to flee predators or humans. These symptoms cause house finch populations to decline due to increased predation and susceptibility to trauma from impaired vision, as well as from starvation due to infected birds' difficulty feeding themselves. House finch conjunctivitis is most frequent during colder months when birds are using bird feeders and can cause birds to be reluctant to leave the feeders. Birds have been seen rubbing their eyes on branches or on bird feeders, which can help spread the disease.

=== Chickens ===
Some major clinical signs of M. gallisepticum in chickens include those of respiratory distress such as coughing, sneezing, slight to marked rales, and difficulty breathing. Swollen eyelids, ocular discharge, and loss of sight are signs and symptoms that are very important for this disease as well. Poor productivity, leg problems, nasal discharge, stunting, inappetence, slow growth, reduced hatchability, reduced chick viability, and abnormal feathers are also some relevant clinical signs of the disease. M. gallisepticum infections in chickens result in relatively mild catarrhal sinusitis, tracheitis, and airsacculitis."

=== Turkeys ===
Mycoplasma gallisepticum causes respiratory infection in turkeys which can induce sinusitis, pneumonia, and airsacculitis. With infectious sinusitis, the birds have symptoms of coughing, swollen sinuses, nasal and ocular discharge, tracheal rales, labored breathing, impaired vision, depression and weight loss. The disease can even cause death and found to especially occur if combined with E. coli. Outbreaks in turkeys occur at an early age usually between 8 and 15 weeks and about 90% of birds show signs. With breeding females, there could be a decline in egg production. "Occasionally an encephalitic form is seen in growing birds. A tenovaginitis may also develop and the organism can be found in the oviduct and semen of infected male birds, leading to infection in the egg and eventually of the young poulty."

=== Other avian species ===
Other avian species that have been affected by this disease are pigeons, chukar partridges, quail, ducks, geese, pheasants, psittacine birds, and peafowl. Most songbirds are resistant except for the wild house finches and some similar species in North America. Some exotic birds infected by this disease include greater flamingos, wild peregrine falcons in Spain, and yellow-naped Amazon parrots.

== Transmission ==
M. gallisepticum can be transmitted within some poultry eggs, which can come from infected breeders to progeny. Also, M. gallisepticum can be transmitted via infectious aerosols and through contamination of feed, water, and environment as well as human activity on fomites which can come from equipment and shoes. When birds are stressed transmission can occur more rapidly through aerosols and respiratory which spread through the flock. When they are in a flock, transmission occurs by direct and indirect contact from the movement of the birds, people and fomites from infected species. With many outbreaks, the source of the infection in the flock is unknown. Some sources that could possibly cause infection and transmission are cold weather, poor air quality, concurrent infections, and some live virus vaccinations.

== Diagnosis ==
The greatest success in isolating M. gallisepticum has been from tissue swabs from live trapped or newly dead birds. In recent studies, it has been found that generally results obtained from dead birds are more reliable. It is difficult to obtain a sample from frozen carcasses. Tissue swabs are taken from the inner eyelids, sinus, and trachea. Many serology tests can be performed to diagnose M. gallisepticum: serum plate agglutination (SPA) test, hemagglutination inhibition test (HI), or enzyme-linked immunosorbent assay (ELISA). The SPA test is more commonly used because it is the simplest and least expensive. Tests can be performed on serum samples as well as tissue samples. However, it has been stated that serological tests cannot be interpreted without the results to be obtained from the PCR method. It has been found that antibody responses change in the early and advanced stages of the disease and the results vary according to the test method.

== Health concerns ==
Mycoplasma gallisepticum causes respiratory disease and weakens the immune system which makes the bird vulnerable to any disease that they come into contact with. Small bubbles will appear in the corners of the eyes and sinuses will swell up. Once infected, they are carriers for the disease for life. Some birds have good resistance to the disease while others may die; some become ill and recover and others may not show any symptoms at all. There is currently no risk to humans. For domestic animals, there is a high concern and there should be a prevention of any interaction between wild birds and domestic poultry. Wild bird species affected by the disease are infectious and are often found in close contact with domestic species.

== Wildlife rehabilitation and treatment ==
Wildlife rehabilitators should be careful to not misdiagnose M. gallisepticum infection with other diseases with similar clinical signs, such as avian influenza, chlamydiosis, Newcastle disease, infectious bronchitis, head trauma, and avian pox virus. M. gallisepticum can be treated with antibiotics such as tylosin, tetracycline, or oral enrofloxacin with ophthalmic gentamicin. These are given through food, water or injections. Especially tylosin gives good results in the feed. However, treated birds must be kept in captivity and isolation for a long time period because birds may become asymptomatic carriers. At this point, it is very difficult to verify if previously infected birds are still infected with M. gallisepticum. Treatment and release is not wise for disease control in wild populations.

== Economic impact ==
Mycoplasma gallisepticum is believed to cost the worldwide poultry industry over $780 million every year. In the United States it is believed to cost over $120 million on egg production alone. Infection can lead to the culling of an entire flock to prevent further spread.

Since the disease causes reduced feed and growth production, carcass condemnations, and retarded growth in juveniles, serious economic losses have occurred. Also, chickens have been documented to lose about 16 eggs over their laying cycle of 45 weeks. This adds up to be a loss of about $140 million annually in the United States alone.
