= Ornithobacterium hominis =

"Candidatus Ornithobacterium hominis"

Scientific classification (Candidatus)
- Domain: Bacteria
- Kingdom: Pseudomonadati
- Phylum: Bacteroidota
- Class: Flavobacteriia
- Order: Flavobacteriales
- Family: Weeksellaceae
- Genus: Ornithobacterium
- Species: "Ca. Ornithobacterium hominis"

Binomial name
- "Candidatus Ornithobacterium hominis" Salter et al.

Species of bacterium

"Candidatus Ornithobacterium hominis" is a gram-negative bacterial species that colonises the human respiratory tract. Despite being related to the bird pathogen O. rhinotracheale, it is not a zoonosis. It has been detected in microbiome data from people around the world, including The Gambia, Madagascar and Central African Republic, Kenya, Mae La refugee camp in Thailand, rural Venezuela, Australia, and Fiji.

== Detection ==
Ca. O. hominis can be identified from its unique 16S rRNA sequence. Alternatively a clinical sample can be tested using a PCR assay targeting either the 16S rRNA gene or the conserved deamidating toxin gene ToxA.

== Culture growth ==
Ca. O. hominis may be cultured from clinical specimens such as nasopharyngeal swabs on solid media including blood agar, chocolate agar, or tryptic soy agar. It requires microaerobic conditions and high humidity. Colonies grow slowly in a mixed bacterial sample and may require up to 5 days incubation at 35–37°C. Colonies are pleomorphic, glistening, grey and concave. They range in size from 1 to 3 mm after 48–120 hours incubation.
