= N-acetyl-1-D-myo-inositol-2-amino-2-deoxy-alpha-D-glucopyranoside deacetylase =

Class of enzymes

Identifiers
- EC no.: 3.5.1.103

Databases
- BRENDA: enzyme data
- ExPASy: NiceZyme view
- KEGG: enzyme entry
- MetaCyc: metabolic pathway
- Rhea: reactions
- PDB structures: RCSB PDB PDBe PDBsum
Search
- PMC: articles
- PubMed: articles
- NCBI: proteins

N-acetyl-1-D-myo-inositol-2-amino-2-deoxy-alpha-D-glucopyranoside deacetylase (EC 3.5.1.103, MshB) is an enzyme characterised from Mycobacterium with systematic name 1-(2-acetamido-2-deoxy-alpha-D-glucopyranosyl)-1D-myo-inositol acetylhydrolase. It catalyses the hydrolysis of 1D-myo-inositol 2-acetamido-2-deoxy-α-D-glucopyranoside to 1D-myo-inositol 2-amino-2-deoxy-α-D-glucopyranoside and acetic acid:

1D-myo-inositol 2-acetamido-2-deoxy-α-D-glucopyranoside
H_{2}O
CH_{3}CO_{2}H
1D-myo-inositol 2-amino-2-deoxy-α-D-glucopyranoside

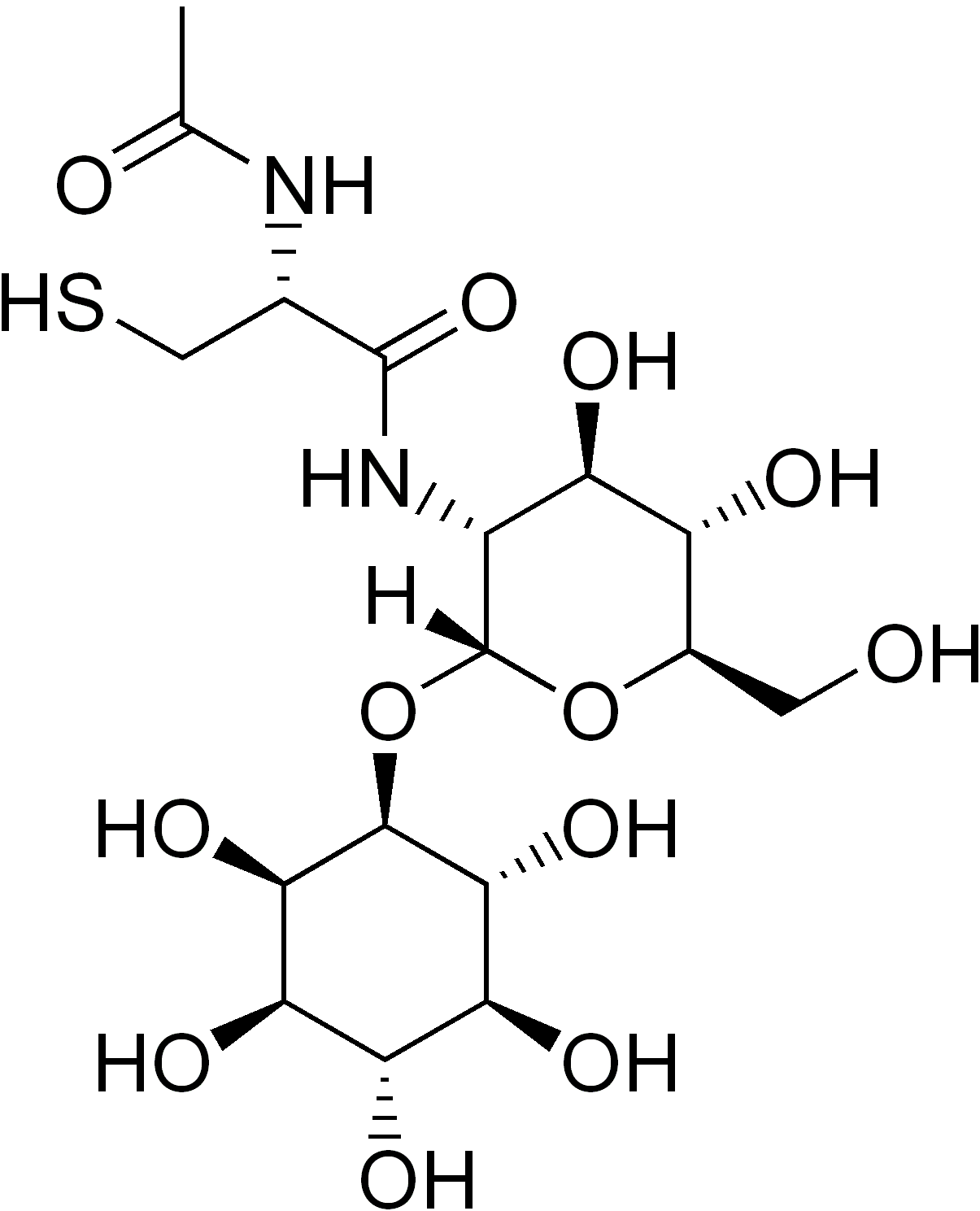
Mycothiol

This enzyme mediates the rate limiting step in the mycothiol biosynthesis pathway. X-ray crystallography showed that the enzyme contains zinc.
