= Mycothione reductase =

Catalytic enzyme

Identifiers
- EC no.: 1.8.1.15

Databases
- IntEnz: IntEnz view
- BRENDA: BRENDA entry
- ExPASy: NiceZyme view
- KEGG: KEGG entry
- MetaCyc: metabolic pathway
- PRIAM: profile
- PDB structures: RCSB PDB PDBe PDBsum
- Gene Ontology: AmiGO / QuickGO
Search
- PMC: articles
- PubMed: articles
- NCBI: proteins

Mycothione reductase (EC 1.8.1.15) is an enzyme that catalyzes the chemical reaction

mycothione + NAD(P)H + H^{+} $\rightleftharpoons$ 2 mycothiol + NADP^{+}

in M. tuberculosis and other actinomycetes.

The two substrates of this enzyme are mycothione and reduced nicotinamide adenine dinucleotide phosphate (NADPH). The products are two molecules of mycothiol and one of NADP^{+}.

This enzyme belongs to the family of oxidoreductases, specifically those acting on a sulfur group of donors with NAD+ or NADP+ as acceptor. The systematic name of this enzyme class is mycothiol:NAD(P)+ oxidoreductase. This enzyme is also called mycothiol-disulfide reductase.
