= Mycothiol synthase =

Identifiers
- EC no.: 2.3.1.189

Databases
- IntEnz: IntEnz view
- BRENDA: BRENDA entry
- ExPASy: NiceZyme view
- KEGG: KEGG entry
- MetaCyc: metabolic pathway
- PRIAM: profile
- PDB structures: RCSB PDB PDBe PDBsum
Search
- PMC: articles
- PubMed: articles
- NCBI: proteins

Mycothiol synthase (EC 2.3.1.189, MshD) is an enzyme with systematic name acetyl-CoA:desacetylmycothiol O-acetyltransferase. It catalyses the following chemical reaction:

desacetylmycothiol
+
acetyl-CoA
mycothiol
+ coenzyme A

This enzyme, found in Actinomycetota and characterised from Mycobacterium tuberculosis catalyses the last step in the biosynthesis of mycothiol. It is a member of a large family of GCN5-related N-acetyltransferases which transfer acetyl groups.
