= Ornithobacterium =

Scientific classification
- Domain: Bacteria
- Kingdom: Pseudomonadati
- Phylum: Bacteroidota
- Class: Flavobacteriia
- Order: Flavobacteriales
- Family: Weeksellaceae
- Genus: Ornithobacterium; Vandamme et al 1994

Type species
- Ornithobacterium rhinotracheale (Vandamme et al. 1994)

Species
- O. hominis; O. rhinotracheale

Genus of bacteria

Ornithobacterium is a genus of Gram-negative, microaerophilic, rod-shaped bacteria from the family Weeksellaceae (formerly Flavobacteriaceae.). It comprises two known species, O. hominis and O. rhinotracheale. Both species inhabit the respiratory tract: O. hominis is found in the human nasopharynx and O. rhinotracheale in the trachea of wild and domesticated birds
