= D-inositol-3-phosphate glycosyltransferase =

Class of enzymes

Identifiers
- EC no.: 2.4.1.250

Databases
- IntEnz: IntEnz view
- BRENDA: BRENDA entry
- ExPASy: NiceZyme view
- KEGG: KEGG entry
- MetaCyc: metabolic pathway
- PRIAM: profile
- PDB structures: RCSB PDB PDBe PDBsum
Search
- PMC: articles
- PubMed: articles
- NCBI: proteins

D-inositol-3-phosphate glycosyltransferase (EC 2.4.1.250, mycothiol glycosyltransferases, MshA) is an enzyme with systematic name UDP-N-acetyl-D-glucosamine:1D-myo-inositol 3-phosphate alpha-D-glycosyltransferase. This enzyme catalyses the following chemical reaction

UDP-N-acetyl-D-glucosamine + 1D-myo-inositol 3-phosphate $\rightleftharpoons$ 1-O-(2-acetamido-2-deoxy-alpha-D-glucopyranosyl)-1D-myo-inositol 3-phosphate + UDP

This enzyme catalyses the first dedicated reaction in the biosynthesis of mycothiol.
