= Bacillithiol =

- Structure of bacillithiol

Names
- IUPAC name (2S)-2-[2-(L-Cysteinamido)-2-deoxy-α-D-glucopyranosyloxy]butanedioic acid
- Systematic IUPAC name (2S)-2-({(2R,3R,4R,5S,6R)-3-[(2R)-2-Amino-3-sulfanylpropanamido]-4,5-dihydroxy-6-(hydroxymethyl)oxan-2-yl}oxy)butanedioic acid

Identifiers
CAS Number	1184928-91-3
3D model (JSmol)	Interactive image
Abbreviations	BSH, Cys-GlcN-mal
ChEBI	CHEBI:61338
ChemSpider	24604693
PubChem CID	42614123
CompTox Dashboard (EPA)	DTXSID701028773
- InChI: InChI=1S/C13H22N2O10S/c14-4(3-26)11(21)15-8-10(20)9(19)6(2-16)25-13(8)24-5(12(22)23)1-7(17)18/h4-6,8-10,13,16,19-20,26H,1-3,14H2,(H,15,21)(H,17,18)(H,22,23)/t4-,5-,6+,8+,9+,10+,13-/m0/s1 Key: UHNHELGKNQMNGF-AOQKXWSCSA-N; InChI=1/C13H22N2O10S/c14-4(3-26)11(21)15-8-10(20)9(19)6(2-16)25-13(8)24-5(12(22)23)1-7(17)18/h4-6,8-10,13,16,19-20,26H,1-3,14H2,(H,15,21)(H,17,18)(H,22,23)/t4-,5-,6+,8+,9+,10+,13-/m0/s1 Key: UHNHELGKNQMNGF-AOQKXWSCBS
- SMILES: C([C@@H]1[C@H]([C@@H]([C@H]([C@H](O1)O[C@@H](CC(=O)O)C(=O)O)NC(=O)[C@H](CS)N)O)O)O

Properties
Chemical formula	C_{13}H_{22}N_{2}O_{10}S
Molar mass	398.39 g/mol
Density	1.629 g/mL
- Except where otherwise noted, data are given for materials in their standard state (at 25 °C [77 °F], 100 kPa). verify (what is ?) Infobox references

Bacillithiol (BSH or Cys-GlcN-mal) is a thiol compound found in Bacillus species. It is likely involved in maintaining cellular redox balance and plays a role in microbial resistance to the antibiotic fosfomycin.

== Structure ==
Chemically, it is a glycoside formed between L-cysteinyl-D-glucosamine and malic acid. It was isolated and identified (as its bacillithiol-S-bimane derivative) in 2009 from Staphylococcus aureus and Deinococcus radiodurans, although it was first detected in 2007, as an unidentified thiol in Bacillus anthracis. The naturally occurring free thiol form of bacillithiol has since been synthesised and characterised along with its biosynthetic precursors and its symmetrical disulfide.

== Biological role ==
Bacillithiol appears to participate in the sensing of peroxides by Bacillus, but may also substitute for glutathione, which is the most common intracellular thiol in eukaryotes and some bacteria. Some of the genes involved in the biosynthesis of bacillithiol were identified and characterised in 2010. Bacteria engineered to be deficient in bacillithiol demonstrated increased sensitivity to various electrophilic xenobiotic compounds, including the antibiotic fosfomycin, suggesting that in these organisms the mechanism of fosfomycin resistance relies on the presence of bacillithiol. Furthermore, in vitro kinetic studies have established that bacillithiol is a preferred thiol substrate for the antibiotic resistance enzyme FosB.

== Biosynthesis ==
Bacillithiol is produced via the enzymes BshA, BshB, and BshC. BshA replaces the UDP group on UDP-N-acetylglucosamine with an L-malyl group. BshB then removes the acetyl group. L-Cysteine is added to the resulting free amine, which completes the biosynthesis of the molecule. The cysteine-adding step is assumed to be carried out by the enzyme BshC on the basis of genetic knockout studies, but the activity of BshC has not been observed in vitro.

== See also ==
- Mycothiol
