= UDP-N-acetylglucosamine 1-carboxyvinyltransferase =

Class of enzymes

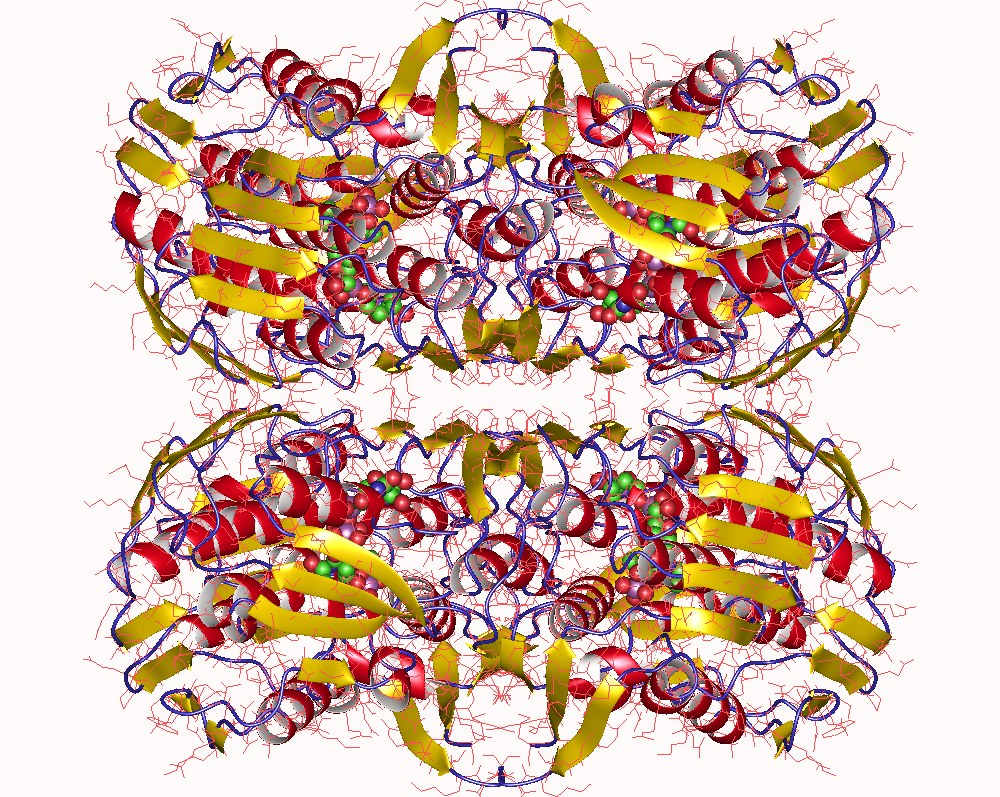
- UDP-N-acetylglucosamine 1-carboxyvinyltransferase tetramer, Enterobacter cloacae

Identifiers
- EC no.: 2.5.1.7
- CAS no.: 9023-27-2

Databases
- IntEnz: IntEnz view
- BRENDA: BRENDA entry
- ExPASy: NiceZyme view
- KEGG: KEGG entry
- MetaCyc: metabolic pathway
- PRIAM: profile
- PDB structures: RCSB PDB PDBe PDBsum
- Gene Ontology: AmiGO / QuickGO
Search
- PMC: articles
- PubMed: articles
- NCBI: proteins

In enzymology, an UDP-N-acetylglucosamine 1-carboxyvinyltransferase (EC 2.5.1.7) is an enzyme that catalyzes the first committed step in peptidoglycan biosynthesis of bacteria:

phosphoenolpyruvate + UDP-N-acetyl-D-glucosamine $\rightleftharpoons$ phosphate + UDP-N-acetyl-3-O-(1-carboxyvinyl)-D-glucosamine

Thus, the two substrates of this enzyme are phosphoenolpyruvate and UDP-N-acetyl-D-glucosamine, whereas its two products are phosphate and UDP-N-acetyl-3-O-(1-carboxyvinyl)-D-glucosamine. The pyruvate moiety provides the linker that bridges the glycan and peptide portion of peptidoglycan.

The enzyme is inhibited by the antibiotic fosfomycin, which covalently modifies an active site cysteine residue.

This enzyme belongs to the family of transferases, specifically those transferring aryl or alkyl groups other than methyl groups. The systematic name of this enzyme class is phosphoenolpyruvate:UDP-N-acetyl-D-glucosamine 1-carboxyvinyltransferase. This enzyme participates in amino sugars metabolism and glycan biosynthesis.

== Structural studies ==
As of late 2007, 10 structures have been solved for this class of enzymes, with PDB accession codes 1A2N, 1DLG, 1EJC, 1EJD, 1EYN, 1NAW, 1Q3G, 1RYW, 1UAE, and 1YBG.

== Literature ==
- Gunetileke KG, Anwar RA (1968). "Biosynthesis of uridine diphospho-N-acetylmuramic acid. II Purification and properties of pyruvate-uridine diphospho-N-acetylglucosamine transferase and characterization of uridine diphospho-N-acetylenopyruvylglucosamine". J. Biol. Chem. 243 (21): 5770–8. doi:10.1016/S0021-9258(18)91931-9. PMID 5699062.
- Zemell RI, Anwar RA (1975). "Pyruvate-uridine diphospho-N-acetylglucosamine transferase Purification to homogeneity and feedback inhibition". J. Biol. Chem. 250 (8): 3185–92. doi:10.1016/S0021-9258(19)41609-8. PMID 1123336.
- van Heijenoort J (2001). "Recent advances in the formation of the bacterial peptidoglycan monomer unit". Nat. Prod. Rep. 18 (5): 503–19. doi:10.1039/a804532a. PMID 11699883.
