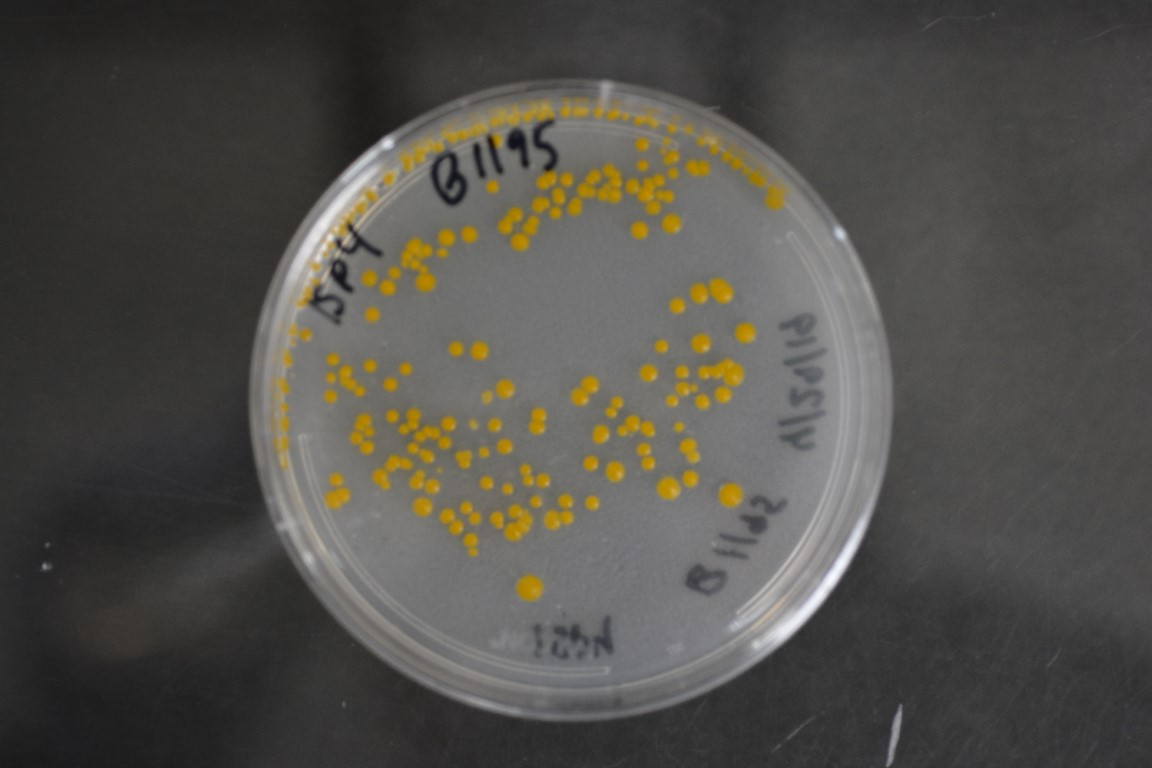

Scientific classification
- Domain: Bacteria
- Kingdom: Bacillati
- Phylum: Actinomycetota
- Class: Actinomycetes
- Order: Streptomycetales
- Family: Streptomycetaceae
- Genus: Streptomyces
- Species: S. fradiae

Binomial name
- Streptomyces fradiae (Waksman and Curtis 1916) Waksman and Henrici 1948

Synonyms
- Streptomyces roseoflavus

= Streptomyces fradiae =

Species of bacterium

Streptomyces fradiae is a species of Actinomycetota. Different strains of S. fradiae are known to produce the antibiotics neomycin, tylosin, and fosfomycin.
