= Mycoplasma synoviae =

Scientific classification
- Domain: Bacteria
- Kingdom: Bacillati
- Phylum: Mycoplasmatota
- Class: Mollicutes
- Order: Mycoplasmatales
- Family: Mycoplasmataceae
- Genus: Mycoplasma
- Species: M. synoviae

Binomial name
- Mycoplasma synoviae Olson et al. 1964 (Approved Lists 1980)

Species of bacterium

Mycoplasma synoviae is a species of bacterium in the genus Mycoplasma. It causes disease in the joints, bones and respiratory system of birds. It is found throughout the world and infection may be referred to as infectious synovitis, avian mycoplasmosis, infectious sinusitis, or mycoplasma arthritis. It is of economic importance because infection can cause a drop in egg production. The disease is most commonly seen in chickens, and transmission occurs both vertically and horizontally.

== Clinical signs & diagnosis ==
Common clinical signs include lameness, a stiff gait, and abnormal curvature of the limbs. Respiratory and neurological signs are also reported. As mentioned, a drop in egg production often occurs.

A preliminary diagnosis can be made based on history, clinical exam, and postmortem signs. Bacterial culture, immunofluorescence, PCR, ELISA, or slide agglutination tests (SAT) can be used to make a more definitive diagnosis.

== Treatment & control ==
Mycoplasma synoviae is treated with antibiotics, but resistance to some types is reported. Specific antibiotic treatment is available for eggs.

The disease is controlled with vaccination.

== See also ==
- Mycoplasma
