= Mycothiol-dependent formaldehyde dehydrogenase =

mycothiol-dependent formaldehyde dehydrogenase

Identifiers
- EC no.: 1.1.1.306

Databases
- IntEnz: IntEnz view
- BRENDA: BRENDA entry
- ExPASy: NiceZyme view
- KEGG: KEGG entry
- MetaCyc: metabolic pathway
- PRIAM: profile
- PDB structures: RCSB PDB PDBe PDBsum
- Gene Ontology: AmiGO / QuickGO
Search
- PMC: articles
- PubMed: articles
- NCBI: proteins

In enzymology, a mycothiol-dependent formaldehyde dehydrogenase (EC 1.1.1.306) is an enzyme that catalyzes the chemical reaction:

S-(hydroxymethyl)mycothiol + NAD^{+} $\rightleftharpoons$ S-formylmycothiol + NADH + ^{+}

The two substrates of this enzyme are S-(hydroxymethyl)mycothiol and oxidised nicotinamide adenine dinucleotide (NAD^{+}). Its products are S-formylmycothiol, reduced NADH, and a proton.

The enzyme belongs to the family of oxidoreductases, specifically those acting on the aldehyde or oxo group of donor with NAD+ or NADP+ as acceptor. The systematic name of this enzyme class is formaldehyde:NAD+ oxidoreductase (mycothiol-formylating). This enzyme is also called NAD/factor-dependent formaldehyde dehydrogenase or S-(hydroxymethyl)mycothiol dehydrogenase.
