= (S)-2-hydroxypropylphosphonic acid epoxidase =

Class of enzymes

Identifiers
- EC no.: 1.11.1.23

Databases
- IntEnz: IntEnz view
- BRENDA: BRENDA entry
- ExPASy: NiceZyme view
- KEGG: KEGG entry
- MetaCyc: metabolic pathway
- PRIAM: profile
- PDB structures: RCSB PDB PDBe PDBsum
Search
- PMC: articles
- PubMed: articles
- NCBI: proteins

(S)-2-hydroxypropylphosphonic acid epoxidase (EC 1.11.1.23, HPP epoxidase, HppE, 2-hydroxypropylphosphonic acid epoxidase, Fom4, (S)-2-hydroxypropylphosphonate epoxidase) is an enzyme with systematic name (S)-2-hydroxypropylphosphonate,NADH:oxygen epoxidase. This enzyme catalyses the following chemical reaction

(S)-2-hydroxypropylphosphonic acid
H_{2}O_{2}
2 H_{2}O
H_{2}O_{2}
2 H_{2}O
fosfomycin

(S)-2-hydroxypropylphosphonic acid epoxidase contains one non-heme iron centre per monomer. The product is the antibiotic fosfomycin.
