= Tylosin =

Chemical compound

Clinical data
- Trade names: Tylocine, Tylan
- AHFS/Drugs.com: International Drug Names
- ATCvet code: QJ01FA90 (WHO) QJ51FA90 (WHO)

Identifiers
- IUPAC name: [(2R,3R,4E,6E,9R,11R,12S,13S,14R) -12- {[3,6-dideoxy-4-O-(2,6-dideoxy-3-C-methyl-α-L-ribo-hexopyranosyl) -3- (dimethylamino)-β-D-glucopyranosyl]oxy}-2-ethyl-14-hydroxy-5, 9,13-trimethyl-8, 16-dioxo-11-(2-oxoethyl)oxacyclohexadeca-4,6-dien-3-yl]methyl 6-deoxy-2,3-di-O-methyl-β-D-allopyranoside
- CAS Number: 1401-69-0
- PubChem CID: 5280440
- ChemSpider: 4444097
- UNII: YEF4JXN031
- KEGG: D02490
- ChEBI: CHEBI:17658
- ChEMBL: ChEMBL42743
- E number: E713 (antibiotics)
- CompTox Dashboard (EPA): DTXSID3043996
- ECHA InfoCard: 100.014.322

Chemical and physical data
- Formula: C_{46}H_{77}NO_{17}
- Molar mass: 916.112 g·mol^{−1}
- 3D model (JSmol): Interactive image
- SMILES: CC[C@@H]1[C@H](/C=C(/C=C/C(=O)[C@@H](C[C@@H]([C@@H]([C@H]([C@@H](CC(=O)O1)O)C)O[C@H]2[C@@H]([C@H]([C@@H]([C@H](O2)C)O[C@H]3C[C@@]([C@H]([C@@H](O3)C)O)(C)O)N(C)C)O)CC=O)C)\C)CO[C@H]4[C@@H]([C@@H]([C@@H]([C@H](O4)C)O)OC)OC
- InChI: InChI=1S/C46H77NO17/c1-13-33-30(22-58-45-42(57-12)41(56-11)37(52)26(5)60-45)18-23(2)14-15-31(49)24(3)19-29(16-17-48)39(25(4)32(50)20-34(51)62-33)64-44-38(53)36(47(9)10)40(27(6)61-44)63-35-21-46(8,55)43(54)28(7)59-35/h14-15,17-18,24-30,32-33,35-45,50,52-55H,13,16,19-22H2,1-12H3/b15-14+,23-18+/t24-,25+,26-,27-,28+,29+,30-,32-,33-,35+,36-,37-,38-,39-,40-,41-,42-,43+,44+,45-,46-/m1/s1; Key:WBPYTXDJUQJLPQ-VMXQISHHSA-N

Tylosin is a macrolide antibiotic and bacteriostatic feed additive used in veterinary medicine. It has a broad spectrum of activity against Gram-positive organisms and a limited range of Gram-negative organisms. It is found naturally as a fermentation product of Streptomyces fradiae.

Tylosin is used in veterinary medicine to treat bacterial infections in a wide range of species and has a high margin of safety. It has also been used as a growth promotant in some species, and as a treatment for colitis in companion animals.

== Mode of action ==
Like other macrolides, tylosin has a bacteriostatic effect on susceptible organisms, caused by inhibition of protein synthesis through binding to the 50S subunit of the bacterial ribosome.

== Spectrum of activity ==
Tylosin has a wide spectrum of activity against Gram-positive bacteria including Staphylococcus, Streptococcus, Corynebacterium, and Erysipelothrix. It has a much narrower Gram-negative spectrum of activity, but has been shown to be active against Campylobacter coli, and certain spirochaetes. It has also been shown to be extremely active against Mycoplasma species isolated from both mammalian and avian hosts. The following represents MIC susceptibility data for a few medically significant pathogens:

- Mycoplasma bovis: 0.06 - 4 μg/ml
- Staphylococcus aureus: 0.5 - >128 μg/ml

== Clinical use ==
Tylosin has been used to treat a variety of different diseases throughout the world. Differing formulations and licensing conditions mean it may not be a recognized method of treatment for certain conditions in certain countries. In general, tylosin is licensed for the treatment of infections caused by organisms susceptible to the drug, but it has also been used as a treatment of colitis in small animals, as a growth promotant in food-producing animals, and as a way of reducing epiphora (tear staining) around the eyes of white-faced dogs. In these cases, the result is positive only when using the tylosin in the form of tartrate, a chelating porphyrin. No marketing authority exists for the use of other tylosin forms as a tear-stain remover, thus it is not legal to use it for such purposes; the exception is as a prescription-only medicine of last resort by veterinarians under the cascading rule (UK) or the extra-label use rule (US).

Examples of bacterial infections that could potentially be treated with tylosin include respiratory infections, metritis, and acute mastitis in cattle; mastitis in sheep and goats; enteritis, pneumonia, erysipelas, and infectious arthritis in swine; and soft-tissue infections in small animals. While tylosin may be one appropriate therapeutic choice in theory for the conditions listed above, many other antibiotics may be preferable for treating a specific infection, and tylosin will not be the first choice.

It is also used as a growth promoter for a variety of terrestrial and aquatic animals grown for human consumption.

== Available forms ==
Tylosin is available in injectable, intramammary, and oral formulations with different product ranges available in different countries.

== Composition ==
Tylosin is a mixture of four major components: tylosins A, B, C, and D. Tylosin A is considered the major component of tylosin (comprises about 90% of tylosin); however, tylosins B, C, and D contribute to the overall potency of tylosin.

== Precautions and contraindications ==
Administration of tylosin should be avoided in animals with a known hypersensitivity to the product, or to other macrolides.

Oral administration can result in diarrhoea and gastrointestinal disturbance. This is particularly true of horses, such that it can be fatal. Tylosin also has a foul taste that is difficult to disguise.

The injectable formulations of tylosin can cause pain, inflammation, and itchiness around the injection site.

Since tylosin has a relatively poor spectrum of activity against Gram-negative organisms, it may not be a sensible therapeutic choice in the treatment of infections caused by unknown, potentially unsusceptible organisms.

== Drug interactions ==
Tylosin may increase digitalis blood levels, thus its toxicity, and may be antagonistic to chloramphenicol or lincosamides.

Colorimetric assays of serum ALT and AST may be falsely elevated by macrolide antibiotics.

== See also ==
- Tylvalosin
