= Ornithobacterium rhinotracheale =

Scientific classification
- Domain: Bacteria
- Kingdom: Pseudomonadati
- Phylum: Bacteroidota
- Class: Flavobacteriia
- Order: Flavobacteriales
- Family: Weeksellaceae
- Genus: Ornithobacterium
- Species: O. rhinotracheale

Binomial name
- Ornithobacterium rhinotracheale Vandamme et al. 1994

Species of bacterium

Ornithobacterium rhinotracheale, or ORT, is a bacterium that causes respiratory disease in poultry. It can cause disease in birds of all ages and is potentially fatal. O. rhinotracheale is found worldwide, and the bacterium may be spread between birds either horizontally or vertically. It is not a zoonosis.

== Clinical Signs ==
Most commonly, respiratory signs are seen. These include nasal discharge, dyspnoea, sneezing and coughing. A drop in growth rates and abnormal egg production and joint problems may also be seen. There are reports of gastrointestinal and neurological symptoms in some cases.

Clinical signs are generally worse in meat producing birds.

== Diagnosis ==
The disease caused by ORT is characterized by pneumonia, pleuritis and air sacculitis on postmortem examination. Diagnosis should be confirmed using laboratory tests such as bacterial culture, PCR, agar gel precipitation, ELISA, or serum agglutination.

== Treatment & Control ==
Antibiotic treatment can be attempted, but is not always successful. The choice of antibiotic should be based on culture and sensitivity results.

Vaccination is reported to reduce the incidence of disease.
