= Mycothiol =

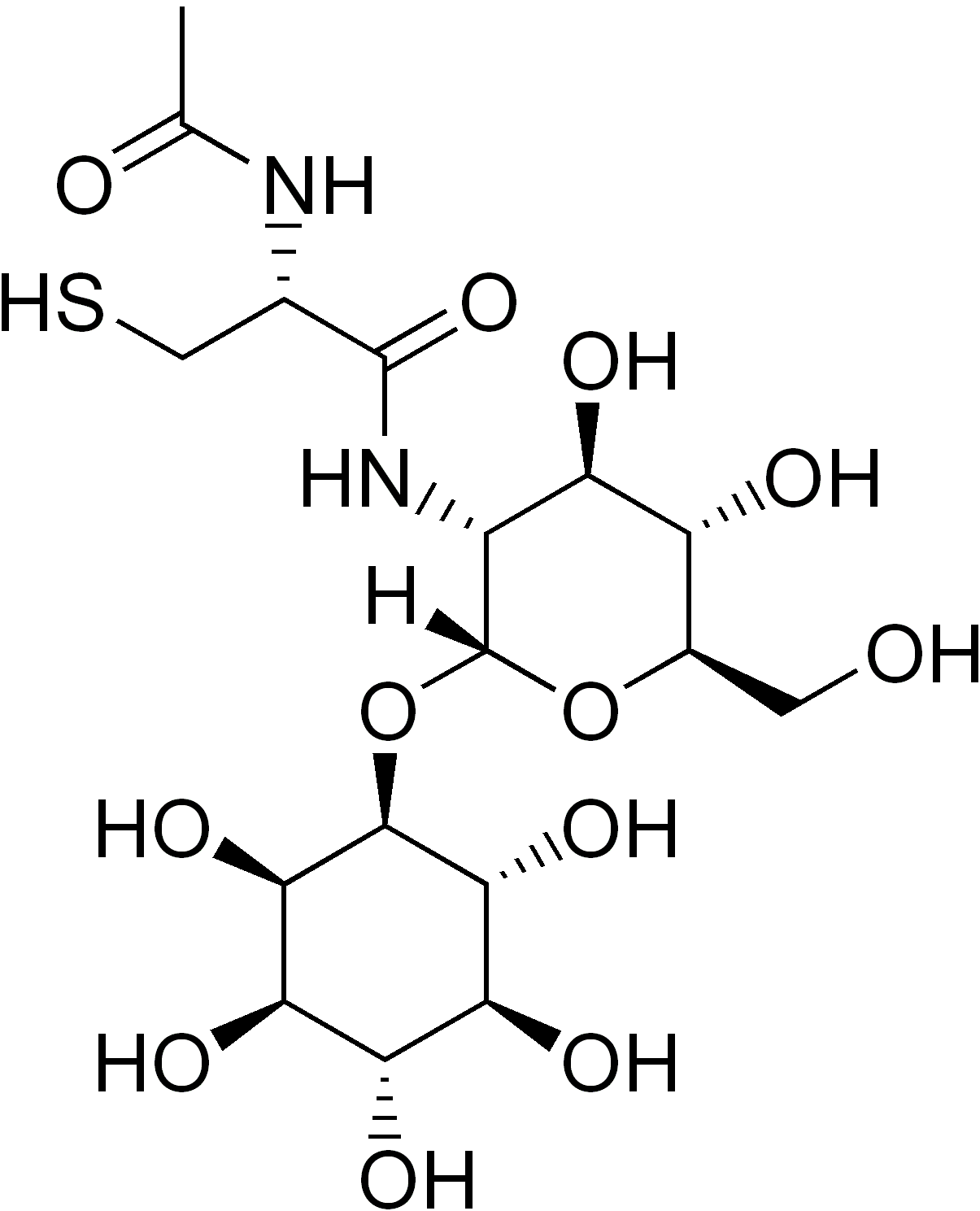

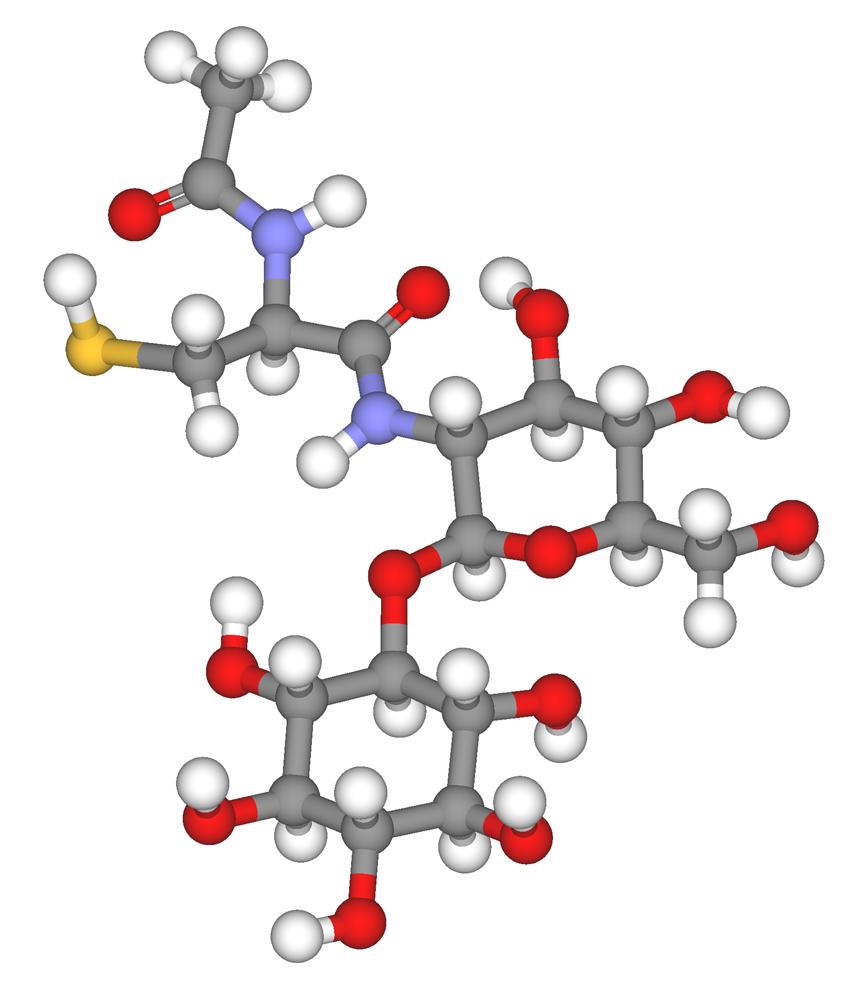

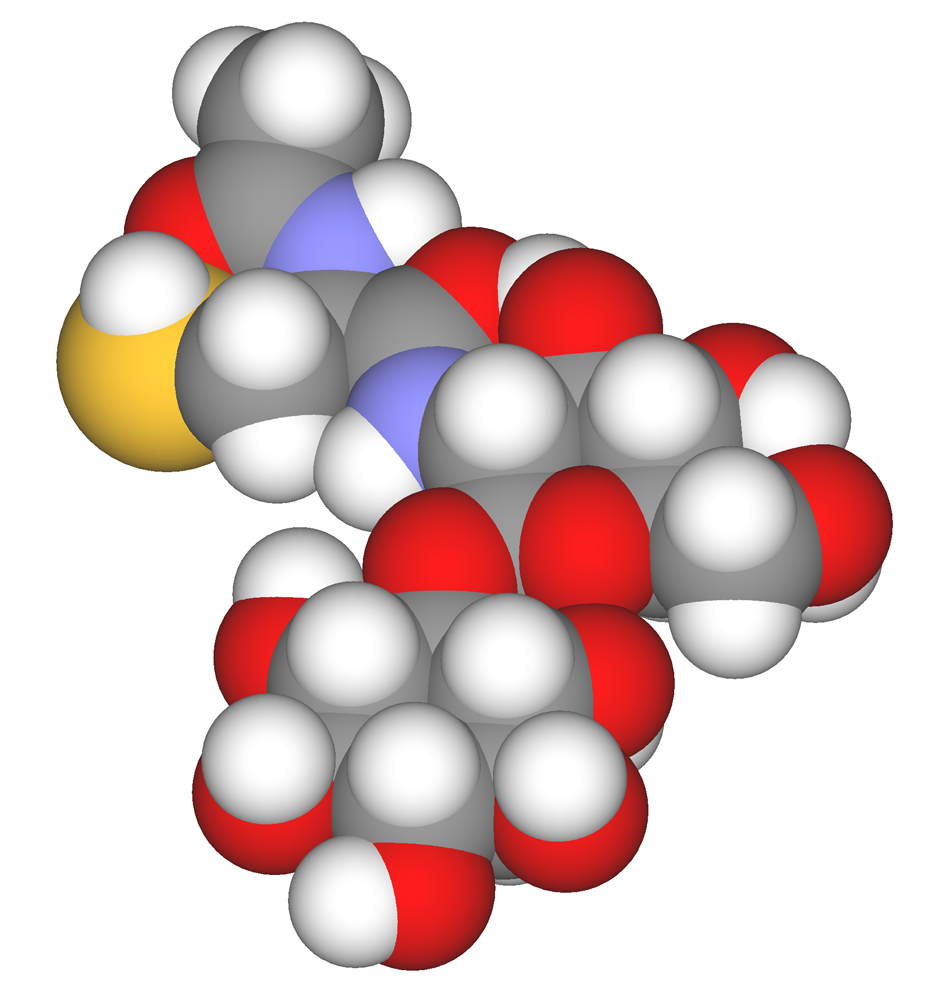

Names
- IUPAC name (2R)-2-acetamido-N-[(2R,3R,4R,5S,6R)-4,5-dihydroxy-6-(hydroxymethyl)-2-[(2R,3S,5R,6R)-2,3,4,5,6-pentahydroxycyclohexyl]oxyoxan-3-yl]-3-sulfanylpropanamide
- Other names Mycothiol

Identifiers
CAS Number	192126-76-4
3D model (JSmol)	Interactive image
ChEBI	CHEBI:16768
ChemSpider	10193006
KEGG	C06717
PubChem CID	441148
UNII	RTA4HG7FQ7
CompTox Dashboard (EPA)	DTXSID901027171
- InChI: InChI=1S/C17H30N2O12S/c1-4(21)18-5(3-32)16(29)19-7-9(23)8(22)6(2-20)30-17(7)31-15-13(27)11(25)10(24)12(26)14(15)28/h5-15,17,20,22-28,32H,2-3H2,1H3,(H,18,21)(H,19,29)/t5-,6+,7+,8+,9+,10-,11-,12+,13+,14+,15-,17+/m0/s1 Key: MQBCDKMPXVYCGO-FQBKTPCVSA-N; InChI=1/C17H30N2O12S/c1-4(21)18-5(3-32)16(29)19-7-9(23)8(22)6(2-20)30-17(7)31-15-13(27)11(25)10(24)12(26)14(15)28/h5-15,17,20,22-28,32H,2-3H2,1H3,(H,18,21)(H,19,29)/t5-,6+,7+,8+,9+,10-,11-,12+,13+,14+,15-,17+/m0/s1 Key: MQBCDKMPXVYCGO-FQBKTPCVBG
- SMILES: CC(=O)N[C@@H](CS)C(=O)N[C@@H]1[C@H]([C@@H]([C@H](O[C@@H]1O[C@@H]2[C@@H]([C@@H]([C@H]([C@@H]([C@H]2O)O)O)O)O)CO)O)O

Properties
Chemical formula	C_{17}H_{30}N_{2}O_{12}S
Molar mass	486.49 g·mol^{−1}
- Except where otherwise noted, data are given for materials in their standard state (at 25 °C [77 °F], 100 kPa). verify (what is ?) Infobox references

Mycothiol (MSH or AcCys-GlcN-Ins) is an unusual thiol compound found in the Actinomycetota. It is composed of a cysteine residue with an acetylated amino group linked to glucosamine, which is then linked to inositol. The oxidized, disulfide form of mycothiol (MSSM) is called mycothione, and is reduced to mycothiol by the flavoprotein mycothione reductase. Mycothiol biosynthesis and mycothiol-dependent enzymes such as mycothiol-dependent formaldehyde dehydrogenase and mycothione reductase have been proposed to be good drug targets for the development of treatments for tuberculosis.

== See also ==
- Glutathione, analogous function in other bacteria
- Bacillithiol
