= Responses to the COVID-19 pandemic in April 2020 =

Sequence of major events in a virus pandemic

This article documents the chronology of the response to the COVID-19 pandemic in April 2020, which originated in Wuhan, China in December 2019. Some developments may become known or fully understood only in retrospect. Reporting on this pandemic began in December 2019.

The regional global responses are categorized by six WHO offices: Africa, Western Pacific, Eastern Mediterranean, South East Asia, Europes, and Americas.

== Reactions and measures at the United Nations ==
=== 1 April ===
The World Health Organization reported that deaths from COVID-19 had more than doubled in the previous week and would soon reach 50,000 globally, with the global caseload heading towards one million.

The UN Department of Economic and Social Affairs reported in a new analysis that the global economy could shrink by up to one per cent in 2020 due to the COVID-19 pandemic, or even further if restrictions on economic activities were continued without sufficient fiscal responses.

The UN High Commissioner for Refugees (UNHCR) outlined a series of measures the UNHCR was taking to respond to the coronavirus public health emergency and prevent further spread, especially those to reinforce health and the ‘WASH’ systems (water, sanitation and hygiene), including distributing soap and increasing water access.

The executive director of the UN Children's Fund warned that an outbreak of COVID-19 in the world's refugee camps was "looking imminent".

The UNHCR and International Organization for Migration emphasized that the worldwide COVID-19 emergency was compounding the already desperate situation for many refugees and migrants from Venezuela.

The United Nations Economic and Social Commission for Western Asia issued a new policy brief noting COVID-19 would be responsible for pushing a further 8.3 million people in the Arab region into poverty.

The UN system in Nigeria announced that it was working with its partners to reduce the spread of the coronavirus, especially in the northeast, where communities and camps house millions of internally displaced people uprooted by the Boko Haram insurgency.

World Meteorological Organization (WMO) Secretary-General Petteri Taalas urged governments to support national early warning and weather observing capacities despite the "severe challenges" caused by COVID-19, as the WMO's Global Observing System came under strain due to the lack of data from commercial airliners.

=== 2 April ===
The United Nations General Assembly passed resolution A/RES/74/270: Global solidarity to fight the coronavirus disease 2019 (COVID-19).

The United Nations postponed the COP26 climate summit postponed to ‘safeguard lives’.

The International Organization for Migration sounded the alarm over conditions in crowded reception centres in Greece as the first migrants tested positive for COVID-19.

UN High Commissioner for Human Rights, Michelle Bachelet, warned of the plight of hundreds of thousands of now unemployed migrant workers in India, calling for ‘domestic solidarity’ in the coronavirus battle.

The World Food Programme (WFP) warned that food insecurity levels for five million people in the Sahel region of Africa were "spiralling out of control", with the COVID-19 pandemic potentially impacting humanitarian supply chains.

On World Autism Awareness Day, the UN Secretary-General appealed for the rights of persons with autism to be taken into account in efforts to address the COVID-19 pandemic.

=== 3 April ===
In a joint statement, the UN refugee agency (UNHCR), the International Organization for Migration, the UN human rights office (OHCHR) and the World Health Organization stressed that "refugees, migrants and displaced persons are at heightened risk of contracting the new coronavirus disease" as health systems threatened to be overwhelmed.

The United Nations Human Rights Commissioner Michelle Bachelet welcomed the decision by many governments to release hundreds of thousands of prisoners to slow the transmission of the new coronavirus within prison systems.

The UN Secretary-General warned of a surge in domestic violence due to lockdowns.

The World Food Programme (WFP) released a major report, "COVID-19: Potential impact on the world's poorest people: A WFP analysis of the economic and food security implications of the pandemic", noting that the global food chain was holding, while pointing out that food exports by major producers could be impacted if the exporting countries panicked.

The UN Secretary-General reiterated his call for a global ceasefire and urged unity in mobilizing "every ounce of energy" to defeat the coronavirus pandemic.

=== 4 April ===
The UN chief of peacekeeping operations Jean-Pierre Lacroix stressed that UN peacekeepers were continuing in their mission to help fragile countries navigate conflict and COVID-19, as he echoed the Secretary-General's call for an immediate global ceasefire.

The United Nations reported it was forced to significantly scale back its activities on Mine Awareness Day, which usually involves football games on cleared minefields.

=== 6 April ===
The UN Working Group of Experts on People of African Descent warned that structural discrimination could be worsening inequalities surrounding access to healthcare and treatment, potentially leading to a rise in disease and death rates among people of African descent.

The World Health Organization teamed up with Global Citizen to launch "One World Together At Home", a global television and streaming event curated by Lady Gaga, to celebrate frontline health care workers in their battle against the pandemic.

UNESCO invited young innovators, data scientists and designers, especially those now out of school, to join a month-long hackathon, CodeTheCurve, to provide digital solutions to the global pandemic.

On the International Day of Sport for Development and Peace, as millions of people were stuck indoors, the World Health Organization urged people to continue to practice sport and exercise, through its #BeActive campaign.

=== 7 April ===
On World Health Day, the World Health Organization and UN Secretary-General António Guterres highlighted the work of the world's medical professionals and urged greater support for nurses and other frontline workers, as well as concern over the lack of personal protective equipment and intimidation and threats.

Yacoub El Hillo, UN Resident and Humanitarian Coordinator in Libya echoed the UN Secretary General's call for a global ceasefire and demanded fighting stop immediately if the country was to have any chance of warding off the COVID-19 outbreak, as he condemned an attack on a major Tripoli hospital.

Independent UN human rights experts called on UN Member States to improve child protection measures to protect the welfare of "millions of children who may be more exposed to violence, sale, trafficking, sexual abuse and exploitation" during the pandemic.

=== 8 April ===
The World Health Organization (WHO) warned that the number of COVID-19 cases in Africa had now increased to over 10,000, with over 500 dead.

Responding to criticism, World Health Organization (WHO) Director-General Tedros Adhanom Ghebreyesus warned against politicizing COVID-19 as unity is the "only option" to defeat the pandemic, emphasizing, "please quarantine politicizing COVID". He outlined five main reasons why countries need the WHO.

United Nations Secretary-General António Guterres urged global support for the World Health Organization (WHO), describing the UN health agency, which has led the multilateral response since the beginning, as "absolutely critical" in overcoming COVID-19.

=== 9 April ===
The UN Secretary-General welcomed a ceasefire declaration by Saudi Arabia in Yemen as a way to contribute towards his global ceasefire call, promote peace and slow the advance of COVID-19.

100 days since the advent of COVID-19, the WHO Director-General announced the publication of WHO's technical strategy update for the next phase of the COVID-19 response, the basis for its Second Preparedness and Response Plan, to be released shortly.

The UN Secretary-General launched a new policy brief on women and equality and issued a dire warning that the pandemic could reverse gains in equality over previous years.

In the 2020 Financing for Sustainable Development Report, the UN-led Inter-Agency Task Force on Financing for Development warned that billions of people in countries on the brink of economic collapse due to COVID-19 are being threatened further by a looming debt crisis, presenting recommendations based on joint research and analysis from more than 60 UN agencies and international institutions.

=== 10 April ===
The World Health Organization (WHO) Director-General Tedros Adhanom Ghebreyesus laid out six factors for consideration when lifting lockdowns, including that transmission is controlled and sufficient public health and medical services are available.

=== 11 April ===
The UN Secretary-General called on religious leaders of all faiths to join forces and work for global peace and focus on the common battle to defeat COVID-19.

In a joint appeal, the five UN envoys to the Middle East urged the region's warring parties to work towards an immediate end to hostilities, emphasizing the Secretary-General's recent call for a global ceasefire during the COVID-19 pandemic.

=== 13 April ===
The Director-General of the World Health Organization (WHO), outlined the agency's latest advice, stressing a mix of social distancing, testing, contact tracing and isolation.

The World Health Organization (WHO), the UN Children's Fund (UNICEF) and other health partners supporting the Measles & Rubella Initiative (M&RI) warned that over 117 million children in 37 countries risked missing out on a measles vaccine.

The United Nations Children's Fund (UNICEF) warned that hundreds of thousands of children in detention were at "grave risk" of contracting COVID-19, calling for their urgent release.

UNESCO warned of unreliable and false information about the COVID-19 pandemic, terming it a global ‘disinfodemic’.

=== 14 April ===
The first of the UN's World Food Programme (WFP) and World Health Organization (WHO) "Solidarity Flights" carried urgently needed medical equipment to Africa, part of a UN-wide initiative.

The UN Secretary-General warned of "a dangerous epidemic of misinformation" during "the most challenging crisis we have faced since the Second World War", leaving millions scared and seeking clear advice.

The UN Secretary-General urged unity and called for countries not to cut the resources of the World Health Organization (WHO), as US President Trump halted funding.

Henrietta Fore, executive director of the UN Children's Fund (UNICEF), warned of online predators putting millions of children at risk during COVID-19 pandemic lockdowns.

Forecasting the "worst economic downturn since the Great Depression", the International Monetary Fund reported that growth for 2020 was likely to be minus three per cent, a dramatic change since the previous World Economic Outlook report in January.

Imran Riza, UN Resident and Humanitarian Coordinator for Syria, warned of a major threat from the coronavirus threat, which had initiated a broad UN containment effort.

=== 15 April ===
The head of the World Health Organization (WHO) stated it was reviewing the impact of the United States (US) withholding funding and upheld the importance of international solidarity in tackling the COVID-19 pandemic one day after the US announced that it was cutting funding, pending a review of how the WHO responded to the initial outbreak in China.

The World Health Organization (WHO) warned of a potential "second wave" of COVID-19 infections in an update to its strategic advice to governments, as some European countries began to relax lockdown measures.

The International Organization for Migration expanded the scope of its Global Strategic Preparedness and Response Plan to include major interventions aiming to mitigate the severe health and socio-economic impacts of the pandemic.

Secretary-General António Guterres pledged that the UN would stand in solidarity with Africa in the face of the unprecedented economic, social and health impacts of the COVID-19 pandemic, from procuring test kits to promoting debt relief.

David Boyd, UN Special Rapporteur on Human Rights and the Environment, appealed for countries not to respond to COVID-19 by lower environmental standards.

=== 16 April ===
UN Secretary-General António Guterres launched a new UN report noting that the looming global recession due to the COVID-19 pandemic could cause hundreds of thousands of additional child deaths in 2020, reversing recent gains in reducing global infant mortality.

=== 17 April ===
The head of the UN children's fund UNICEF warned that 250 million children globally living in the "waking nightmare" of conflict desperately needed warring parties to adopt the UN Secretary General's call for a global ceasefire as the COVID-19 pandemic spreads.

Philip Alston, the UN Special Rapporteur on Extreme Poverty and Human Rights, warned that the United States must take urgent additional steps to prevent tens of millions of middle-class Americans impacted by the COVID-19 pandemic from being "plunged into poverty".

UNWTO Secretary-General, Zurab Pololikashvili, warned that tourism, which accounts for 10 per cent of global GDP, could lose millions of jobs but offered potential for an economic recovery.

Michelle Bachelet, the UN High Commissioner for Human Rights, issued new guidance setting out key actions to protect lesbian, gay, bisexual, trans and intersex (LGBTI) people against discrimination during the COVID-19 pandemic.

=== 19 April ===
The head of the World Health Organization (WHO) urged the G20 leading global economies to plan to ease lockdowns against COVID-19 only as part of "a phased process".

UN Secretary-General António Guterres sent a video message in support of the UN-supported 'One World: Together At Home' event.

=== 20 April ===
The United Nations General Assembly passed resolution A/RES/74/274: International cooperation to ensure global access to medicines, vaccines and medical equipment to face COVID-19, urging swift access to vaccines.

The World Health Organization (WHO) reiterated its stance on the lifting of lockdown measures, stating, "We want to re-emphasize that easing restrictions is not the end of the epidemic in any country".

The heads of multiple major UN humanitarian agencies and offices, including the World Health Organization (WHO), the World Food Programme (WFP), and the Office for Coordination of Humanitarian Affairs (OCHA), launched an urgent appeal for $350 million to support global aid hubs to help those vulnerable during the COVID-19 pandemic.

Henrietta Fore, executive director of the United Nations Children's Fund (UNICEF), and UN High Commissioner for Refugees Filippo Grandi issued a joint statement pledging to accelerate work to expand refugee children's access to protection, education, clean water and sanitation.

The UN's International Fund for Agricultural Development (IFAD) launched the Rural Poor Stimulus Facility, which aims to reduce the impact of COVID-19 on farmers and rural communities in developing countries.

Gillian Triggs, Assistant High Commissioner for Protection at the Office of the UN High Commissioner for Refugees, warned of the urgent need to protect "refugee, displaced and stateless women and girls at the time of this pandemic".

=== 21 April ===
A new study on food insecurity by an alliance of UN, governmental, and non-governmental agencies (Global Network Against Food Crises) warned that the COVID-19 pandemic was perpetuating a downward cycle of acute food insecurity for around 135 million people across 55 countries.

Executive Director of the World Food Programme (WFP) David Beasley warned the UN Security Council to act fast in the face of famines of "biblical proportions" in what was not only "a global health pandemic but also a global humanitarian catastrophe".

A UN ECLAC report warned that the COVID-19 pandemic would result in the worst economic contraction in the history of Latin American and the Caribbean since the Great Depression, with a projected -5.3 per cent drop in activity in 2020.

New data from UNESCO and partners revealed extreme divides in digitally-based distance learning for most of the world's students now at home due to COVID-19, as half of all students currently out of the classroom (nearly 830 million learners globally) lacked access to a computer, with over 40 per cent having no home Internet.

UN Secretary-General António Guterres pledged the UN's continued support to the Alliance of Small Island States on climate change and the socioeconomic effects of COVID-19.

=== 22 April ===
The International Telecommunication Union (ITU) confirmed that 5G was in no way responsible for the spread of the COVID-19 virus.

The Director-General of the World Health Organization (WHO) warned against 'complacency' as countries continue to battle COVID-19 and citizens grew weary of stay-at-home measures.

On International Mother Earth Day, UN Secretary-General António Guterres flagged the COVID-19 pandemic as "an unprecedented wake-up call" and offered six ways to help the climate.

=== 23 April ===
The UN Secretary-General released a new policy brief on shaping an effective, inclusive response to the COVID-19 pandemic, echoed his February Call to Action to put human dignity and the Universal Declaration of Human Rights at the core of the UN's work, and warned that the coronavirus pandemic was "fast becoming a human rights crisis".

=== 24 April ===
The UN backed the virtual launch of the G20 Access to COVID-19 Tools (ACT) Accelerator initiative, to boost commitment and support for the production of COVID-19 diagnostics, therapeutics and vaccines.

UN High Commissioner for Human Rights, Michelle Bachelet, expressed alarm over press clampdowns stifling the free flow information in some countries, vital in getting the COVID-19 under control.

The UN Office for the Coordination of Humanitarian Affairs (OCHA) in a statement called for greater funding as it worked to set up basic handwashing stations, deliver clean drinking water and food, and launch public information campaigns on COVID-19, for 100 million people at risk.

The UN Population Fund (UNFPA) and World Health Organization (WHO) reported that lessons learned during the Ebola outbreak in Liberia six years previously were helping it to confront COVID-19.

=== 25 April ===
The UN World Health Organization (WHO) warned that there was as yet no evidence that people who had recovered from COVID-19 and had antibodies were protected from a second infection.

=== 26 April ===
At the start of World Immunization Week, UNICEF warned that millions of children were in danger of missing life-saving vaccines against measles, diphtheria and polio due to disruptions in immunization as the world attempted to slow the transmission of COVID-19.

=== 27 April ===
The WHO warned about the pandemic's impact on health services, especially for children, particularly vaccination.

Deputy Secretary-General Amina Mohammed launched a new women-led initiative to mobilize support to save lives and protect livelihoods in the face of COVID-19, 'Rise for All', a social and economic recovery initiative to bring women leaders together in calling the world to action in support of the UN Response and Recovery Fund and Framework.

UN High Commissioner for Human Rights, Michelle Bachelet, warned of a 'toxic lockdown culture' of state repression and stated that emergency powers "should not be a weapon governments can wield to quash dissent, control the population, and even perpetuate their time in power".

=== 28 April ===
The UN Population Fund (UNFPA) and partners released new data suggesting ongoing lockdowns and major disruptions to health services during the COVID-19 pandemic could result in seven million unintended pregnancies in the next few months.

Marking the World Day for Safety and Health at Work, the International Labour Organization (ILO) issued a new report, Ensuring Safety and Health at Work, urging countries to take action to prevent and control COVID-19 in the workplace.

The ILO issued a new report, ILO Monitor Third Edition: COVID-19 and the World of Work, reporting that approximately 1.6 billion people employed in the informal economy, i.e., nearly half the global workforce, could see their livelihoods destroyed due to the lockdown responses to the spread of COVID-19, while over 430 million enterprises in hard-hit sectors risked "serious disruption".

The WHO launched a major UN-led initiative to secure supplies of key medical equipment for 135 low to medium-income countries responding to the COVID-19 pandemic.

The UN Secretary-General addressed the Petersberg Climate Dialogue in Berlin, stating that the parallel threats of COVID-19 and climate change required "brave, visionary and collaborative leadership" and noting that the Sustainable Development Goals were under threat.

=== 29 April ===
UNESCO, UNICEF, and the World Bank, acting as part of the Global Education Coalition, issued new guidelines to assist governments in making decisions on safely reopening schools for 1.3 billion students affected by closures.

The World Food Programme (WFP) and the UN Children's Fund (UNICEF) urged governments to act immediately to support the futures of 370 million children globally depending on school meals.

=== 30 April ===
Climate activist Greta Thunberg along with Danish NGO Human Act launched a child rights-driven campaign to support UNICEF in protecting children's lives during the COVID-19 pandemic.

UN special rapporteurs, independent experts and working groups issued a joint statement calling on the United States to lift its blockade on Cuba to save lives amid the expanding COVID-19 crisis.

== Reactions and measures in Africa ==
Map of the WHO's regional offices and their respective operating regions. Africa; HQ: Brazzaville, Republic of Congo Western Pacific; HQ: Manila, Philippines Eastern Mediterranean; HQ: Cairo, Egypt South East Asia; HQ: New Delhi, India Europe; HQ: Copenhagen, Denmark Americas; HQ: Washington D.C., US

=== 1 April ===
Eritrea announced a three-week lockdown, commencing 2 April to combat the spread of COVID-19.

Sierra Leone declared that a three-day lockdown would come into effect on Saturday (4 April).

=== 3 April ===
At a press briefing, the Director General of the Ghana Health Service, announced the commencement of local production of nose masks as part of efforts to arrest the spread of the pandemic in Ghana.

=== 4 April ===
President of Malawi Peter Mutharika announces several measures to support small and medium businesses including tax breaks, reducing fuel allowances and increasing risk allowances for health workers. The President also announces that he and his Cabinet will take a 10 percent salary cut.

198 markets in the Eastern Region of Ghana were disinfected as part of the drive to control the pandemic. The Ministry of Local Government and Rural Development teamed up with Moderpest Company and Zoomlion Ghana for the exercise.

The Nigerian Government announces the creation of a 500 billion naira (US$1.39 billion) coronavirus crisis intervention fund to upgrade its healthcare infrastructure.

=== 6 April ===
Alibaba Group CEO Jack Ma donates 500 ventilators, 200,000 suits and face shields, 2,000 thermometers, one million swabs and extraction kits and 500,000 gloves to all 54 African countries.

Kenyan President Uhuru Kenyatta announces a halt to all movement in parts of the country affected by COVID-19 including the capital Nairobi, coming into effect on 7pm on 6 April for a period of 21 days.

The Nigerian Government requests a US$6.9 billion fund from international lenders to alleviate the economic impact of the coronavirus.

The Independent Communications Authority of South Africa introduces an emergency release of broadband spectrum to meet a spike in internet usage caused by the coronavirus pandemic.

=== 7 April ===
Benin's government ordered residents in several cities and towns to wear face masks. The Benin government also placed a "cordon sanitaire" on 12 areas including the capital Porto-Novo and largest city Cotonou, banning travel, public gatherings, and shutting down public transportation. This came into effect the following day.

=== 8 April ===
Ethiopian Prime Minister Abiy Ahmed declares a state of emergency to combat the spread of COVID-19. Ethiopian authorities have already banned public gatherings, closed schools, and required employees to work from home.

South African President Cyril Ramaphosa orders that the Minister of Communications, Telecommunications and Postal Services Stella Ndabeni-Abrahams be placed on "special leave" for two months for breaching lockdown requirements by having lunch with a former official in her home.

=== 9 April ===
Dr John Nkengasong, the Director of the Africa Centres for Disease Control and Prevention (Africa CDC), condemns remarks made on 1 April by two French scientists Professors Jean-Paul Mira and Camille Locht that a potential tuberculosis vaccine for the coronavirus be tested on Africa as "disgusting and racist." Mira had issued an apology for his statements via his employer, the Paris network of hospitals, on 3 April, while Locht could not be reached by that date for comment.

The entire Parliament of Botswana including President of Botswana Mokgweetsi Masisi will be quarantined for 14 days and tested for the coronavirus after a health worker screening lawmakers for the virus herself tested positive overnight.

South African President Cyril Ramaphosa defends the World Health Organization (WHO) in response to criticism by US President Trump. President Ramaphosa also extended the country's lockdown, which had stated on 27 March and was due to last 21 days, by a further two weeks.

Ugandan President Yoweri Museveni issues a Twitter post discouraging people from jogging in groups and instead encouraging them to exercise indoors.

=== 10 April ===
The Senegalese government bans companies from dismissing employees during the coronavirus pandemic except in cases of gross negligence, commencing 14 April.

Zimbabwe's national carrier, Air Zimbabwe, which is facing a US$30 million debt, places all its workers on indefinite unpaid leave.

=== 13 April ===
Nigerian President Muhammadu Buhari announces that the Nigerian Government will extend lockdowns in the states of Lagos, Abuja and Ogun by another 14 days.

South Africa evacuates 136 of its nationals from Nigeria on a chartered South African Airways flight.

=== 14 April ===
The Ghana Education Service and Zoomlion Ghana Limited joined forces to launch an initiative to fumigate all senior high, special and technical schools in the country to curb the spread of the pandemic.

President of Guinea Alpha Condé makes it compulsory for all citizens and residents to wear face masks, coming into effect on 18 April. Offenders face a civil disobedience tax of 30,000 Guinean francs (US$3.16, €2.8). Condé also called upon all companies, ministries and NGOs to provide masks to their employees by Saturday and called for masks to be manufactured locally and sold cheaply.

President of Uganda Yoweri Museveni extends the country's initial 14-day lockdown by an extra three weeks until 5 May in order to combat the spread of COVID-19.

President of Zimbabwe Emmerson Mnangagwa threatens to jail the author of a statement, claiming that the nationwide lockdown had been extended, for 20 years for posting "fake news."

=== 15 April ===
The International Monetary Fund approves a $115 million disbursement for Burkina Faso and another $114 million for Niger under its Rapid Credit Facility to help African states cope with the COVID-19 pandemic.

In Malawi, the Minister of Health and Population Jappie Mhango announces that the Malawian Government will be imposing a three-week nationwide lockdown between 18 April and 9 May in a bit to combat the spread of the coronavirus.

=== 16 April ===
Dr John Nkengasong, Director of the Africa CDC, announces that the agency will distribute 1 million test kits across Africa with the goal of testing 15 million people over the next three months.

In Kenya, Governor of Nairobi Mike Sonko draws media attention for distributing cognac and Hennessy to the poor, claiming it can cure the coronavirus. His claims have been rejected by the Kenyan Government and the liquor company LVMH.

The Liberian Government announces that it will launch a radio schooling initiative for children whose education was disrupted after Liberia closed schools across the country on 16 March in response to the country's first coronavirus case.

Nigeria's National Human Rights Commission reports there were eight documented incidents of extrajudicial killings by law security forces resulting in 18 deaths.

South African Minister of Mineral Resources Gwede Mantashe announces that the South African Government will allow mines to operate at 50 percent capacity in order to contain the spread of COVID-19.

=== 17 April ===
Michel Yao, the head of emergency operations for World Health Organization Africa, could rise to 10 million in three to six months based on computer modelling.

The Malawian High Court issues a ruling temporarily barring the Malawian Government from imposing a 21-day lockdown following a petition by the human rights NGO Malawi Human Rights Defenders Coalition (HRDC) and protests by small-scale traders complaining that the lockdown would cause hardship and poverty.

=== 18 April ===
The Algerian Government extended its lockdown by 10 days, through 29 April.

In Nigeria, Abba Kyari, the Chief of Staff to President Muhammadu Buhari, died from the coronavirus.

=== 19 April ===
Rwanda and the Democratic Republic of Congo announce that they will mandate the wearing of face masks.

President of Zimbabwe Emmerson Mnangagwa has extended the country's lockdown by two weeks.

=== 20 April ===
Ghana is using drones from Zipline to test people more quickly outside of the major cities. Zipline will fly samples collected from more than 1,000 health facilities in rural areas to laboratories in the capital Accra and Kumasi. The Ghanaian Government has also ended a three-week lockdown in Accra and Kumasi, the country's two major cities.

=== 21 April ===
Nigerian President Muhammadu Buhari has called for the release of prisoners awaiting trial, elderly, and terminally ill prisoners in an effort to ease overcrowding in Nigerian prisons.

South African President Cyril Ramaphosa has announced a US$26 billion relief package to help businesses and people in need during the coronavirus pandemic.

=== 22 April ===
Police Minister Bheki Cele has confirmed the arrest of 131 government officials including police officers, councillors, health officials and corrections officers for flouting the country's coronavirus regulations including selling confiscated alcohol.

=== 23 April ===
The German investment bank KfW has delivered two mobile diagnostic laboratories to Uganda and Rwanda to help combat the coronavirus. More mobile laboratory units have been dispatched to the six member states of the East African Community.

The South African Competition Tribunal has launched an investigation of the pharmaceutical group Dis-Chem for increasing the price of face masks by 261%. South African President Cyril Ramaphosa has announced a partial reopening of the economy from 1 May including the easing of travel restrictions and allowing some industries to operate under a five-level risk system.

=== 24 April ===
Liberian President George Weah has extended the country's lockdown, which was first introduced on 8 April, by two weeks. Weah also added a new measure requiring people to wear face masks.

=== 25 April ===
The Algerian Government has allowed certain businesses including those supplying building materials and public works, appliances, fabrics, jewellery, clothing and shoes, cosmetics and perfumes, home and office furniture, pastries hairdressers, and taxis to resume business in order to reduce the economic and social impact of the coronavirus pandemic.

The International Monetary Fund has disbursed US$309 million to help Mozambique to fight the coronavirus pandemic.

Nigeria Governors' forum, representing the country's 36 governors, have petitioned Nigerian President Muhammadu Buhari to make it compulsory to wear face masks in public.

South African Minister of Trade and Industry Ebrahim Patel announces plans to reopen South Africa's agricultural sector and allow some manufacturing and retail to resume.

=== 26 April ===
The Cuban Government has sent 216 healthcare workers to South Africa to help with the coronavirus pandemic. Cuba has already sent 20 medical brigades mainly to African and Caribbean countries but also Italy.

=== 27 April ===
In Equatorial Guinea, 30 workers at an offshore oil platform have tested positive for the coronavirus.

Madagascar police have punished people caught without a face mask in Antananarivo and Fianarantsoa by forcing them to sweep pavements.

Nigerian President Muhammadu Buhari announced that Nigeria would begin a "gradual and phased" easing of lockdown regions commencing 4 May.

Senegal has distributed cheap mobile testing kits and 3D-printed ventilators to help combat the coronavius pandemic.

The Office of South African President Cyril Ramaphosa has confirmed that 217 Cuban health specialists and workers have arrived to assist in the fight against the coronavirus pandemic.

=== 28 April ===
The International Monetary Fund has loaned Nigeria US$3.4 billion in emergency funding to deal with the economic fallout of the coronavirus pandemic.

=== 30 April ===
The World Health Organization's regional head Matshidiso Moeti has expressed concern about the community spread of the coronavirus in West Africa.

== Reactions and measures in the Americas ==
=== 1 April ===
President of the United States Donald Trump posted his "Coronavirus Guidelines for America" on Twitter after warning that the United States faced a "very painful" two weeks as it confronted the virus. That same day, the White House projected that the United States could face between 100,000 and 240,000 deaths as a result of the COVID-19 pandemic.

The US Food and Drug Administration reported that it was facing a shortage of malaria drugs including hydroxychloroquine and related chloroquine due to a surge in demand caused by the coronavirus pandemic.

The United States Department of Homeland Security and Department of Justice suspended hearings for asylum seekers in Mexico until 1 May.

Panama began to enforce an absolute quarantine measure, during which, male and female citizens would only be allowed to be outside their homes on alternating days of the week.

=== 2 April ===
President of Brazil Jair Bolsonaro made remarks minimising the impact of the coronavirus and highlighting that confinement and quarantine measures could hurt the Brazilian economy.

South American airliner LATAM Airlines Group announced that it would cut 95% of flight operations. The airline would maintain 39 domestic routes in Brazil, 13 in Chile and 4 international routes.

The United States reported that 6.7 million people had filed for unemployment benefits in the past week.

Following intervention by President Trump, Fort Lauderdale authorities allowed two coronavirus-stricken cruise liners, MS Zaandam and MS Rotterdam to dock at Port Everglades.

Governor of New York Andrew Cuomo announced that New York state only had enough ventilators for the next six days. In response, President Trump invoked the Defense Production Act to ramp up the production of both ventilators and protective face masks by US companies. In addition, the President extended an offer to Iran to help with the coronavirus pandemic.

Boeing CEO Dave Calhoun announced a voluntary layoff plan in response to the economic setbacks experienced by the aviation industry.

The World Bank approved a plan to invest US$160 billion in emergency aid over the next 15 months to help countries deal with the coronavirus.

=== 3 April ===
President of Guatemala Alejandro Giammattei banned internal travel and gathering at beaches before and during the Easter holidays in order to combat the spread of the coronavirus.

The Chinese Government donated 1,000 ventilators to New York state with the help of Chinese billionaires Jack Ma and Joseph Tsai. New York Governor Andrew Cuomo signed an executive order allowing state authorities to requisition unused ventilators and personal protective equipment from hospitals.

The United States Centers for Disease Control and Prevention (CDC) initiated antibody tests to help determine how many people had been infected with the coronavirus including those who have never developed symptoms.

Jared Moskowitz, head of Florida Division of Emergency Management, blasted the American company 3M of selling N95 masks directly to foreign countries for cash instead of the United States. Moskowitz stated that 3M agreed to authorize distributors and brokers to represent they were selling the masks to Florida, but instead his team for the last several weeks "get to warehouses that are completely empty." He then said the 3M authorized U.S. distributors later told him the masks Florida contracted for never showed up because the company instead prioritized orders that come in later, for higher prices, from foreign countries (including Germany, Russia, and France). As a result, Moskowitz highlighted the issue on Twitter, saying he decided to "troll" 3M.

The United States Department of Labor reported that the US economy lost 701,100 jobs in March, ending 113 months of job growth. The US unemployment rate rose to 4.4 percent.

US President Trump also invoked the Defense Production Act to force 3M to prioritize US orders over international orders and to stop exporting American-made respirators to Canada and Latin America. In response, Canadian Prime Minister Justin Trudeau warned that it would be a mistake for the US to block the flow of medical supplies into Canada.

Washington state Governor Jay Inslee extended stay-at-home orders until 23 May. These orders would keep non-essential businesses closed and most of the state's residents at home.

=== 4 April ===
Al Jazeera reports that thousands of people have been detained across Central America for violating lockdown measures and curfews: Honduras (2,250 people), Guatemala (5,705), Panama (over 5,000 including 424 for violating rules that limit men and women to leave homes on alternate days).

United States Attorney General William Barr issues an executive order allowing the Bureau of Prisons to release vulnerable prisoners from federal correctional facilities into home detention. Priority will be given to facilities affected by COVID-19 including Oakdale in Louisiana, Elkton in Ohio, and Danbury in Connecticut.

=== 5 April ===
US President Trump urges Americans worried about the coronavirus to take a drug known as hydroxychloroquine, which is used to treat malaria, arthritis and lupus, contradicting advice from US federal public health advisers.

=== 6 April ===
The 2020 Masters Tournament, originally scheduled to be held on 12–15 November at Augusta National Golf Club in Augusta, Georgia, is postponed.

Apple Inc. CEO Tim Cook announces that his company will produce and ship 1 million face shields for use by medical workers at its factories in the US and China, focusing on the US for initial distribution.

In Canada, Premier of Ontario Doug Ford criticizes the United States for blocking the supply of three million masks over the weekend.

In the United States, New York state Governor Andrew Cuomo extends an order closing non-essential businesses and schools until 29 April. Governor of South Carolina Henry McMaster orders all residents to stay at home except for purchasing groceries and exercising.

=== 7 April ===
Brazilian Health Minister Luiz Henrique Mandetta warns that the country faces a shortage of respirators.

Canadian Prime Minister Justin Trudeau confirms that the Canadian Government is working with the United States Government to allow the movement of medical supplies to Canada following complaints that Washington had blocked the shipment of face masks. United States Secretary of State Mike Pompeo has announced that the Trump Administration will focus on keeping key medical supplies including personal protection equipment in the United States. Secretary of the Treasury Steven Mnuchin calls upon the Congress to approve an additional US$250 billion subsidy for a small business relief programme by Saturday. This would supplement a US$350 billion relief programme for small businesses that was launched earlier on Friday.

=== 8 April ===
Brazilian President Jair Bolsonaro announces that Brazil will purchase the anti-malaria drug hydroxychloroquine despite scientists warning that there is insufficient evidence that the drug treats COVID-19.

President of Peru Martin Vizcarra extends the national state of emergency until 26 April.

United States President Trump criticises the World Health Organization (WHO)'s handling of the coronavirus pandemic and alleged that the international organisation had pursued a "very China-centric" approach. In response, the WHO's Director-General Tedros Adhanom has defended his agency's handling of the COVID-19 pandemic in response to President Trump's criticism, urging world leaders not to politicise the pandemic. Uruguay approves a humanitarian flight to evacuate Australian and New Zealand passengers from the Aurora Expeditions cruise ship Greg Mortimer, where 60% of the passengers tested positive for COVID-19. The New York Times reports that genomic analysis of New York infections indicates the immediate origin of its cases were travelers from Europe instead of Asia and that weeks before its first confirmed infection, the virus has likely present in New York during mid-February.

The U.S. Customs and Border Protection (CBP) and the Federal Emergency Management Agency (FEMA) issue a joint announcement that they will seize exports of medical supplies including respirators, surgical masks and surgical gloves until they can determine whether it should be returned for use in the US, purchased by the US Government, or exported. This followed an earlier memorandum on 1 April by President Trump empowering federal agencies to keep medical supplies within US borders.

Governor of New York Andrew Cuomo issues a directive for flags to be flown at half-mast in New York state to honor victims of the coronavirus.

Google announces that it will give gamers two months of free access to Google Stadia Pro, its cloud gaming service, to cope with COVID-19 lockdowns. This offer was available in 14 countries and was to be rolled out over 48 hours.

Twitter CEO Jack Dorsey contributes 28% of his fortune to create a US$1 billion fund known as StartSmall, focusing initially on global relief efforts for the coronavirus pandemic.

=== 9 April ===
Canada reports a record 1 million job losses in March with the national unemployment rate soaring to 7.8%. Canadian health authorities also estimate that between 11,000 and 22,000 could die from COVID-19 in Canada.

The US Centers for Disease Control issues new guidelines advising people working in essential services like healthcare and food supply to check their temperatures before going to work, wear face masks, and practise social distancing. According to figures, 6.6 million Americans have filed for unemployment as a result of the coronavirus pandemic.

The Japanese company Fujifilm enters the second phase of its Avigan anti-flu clinical trial on 50 patients at three hospitals in Massachusetts.

The Nicaraguan government releases 1,700 prisoners in response to the coronavirus pandemic but excludes political prisoners.

The United Nations delivers 90 tons of medical supplies, sanitation equipment, and water to Venezuela including 28,000 PPE kits for health workers, oxygen concentrators, pediatric beds, water quality control products and hygiene kits. The Bangkok-based United Nations Human Rights Office for Southeast Asia calls upon governments to protect the health of migrants from COVID-19 by releasing them from detention centres and suspending deportations.

Uber's Vice President of safety and insurance Gus Fuldner announces that the company will be shipping millions of masks to active drivers and food delivery people around the world to help combat the spread of COVID-19.

=== 10 April ===
According to US Government figures, 16.8 million Americans have lost their jobs in the past three weeks as a result of the coronavirus. The US Centres for Disease Control extends their "No Sail Order" for cruise ships. There are approximately 100 cruise ships and nearly 80,000 crew off the East Coast, West Coast, and Gulf Coast of the United States. The order can only be rescinded under the following conditions: after the expiration of the US Secretary of Health and Human Services' declaration that COVID-19 constitutes a public health emergency; the CDC Director rescinds or modifies the order based on specific public health or other considerations; or 100 days after the date of publication in the Federal Register.

United States President Trump calls upon the US Congress to pass a US$251 billion bill providing emergency funding for business. He criticizes the Democratic Party for blocking the bill.

Governor of California Gavin Newsom reports a 1.9% drop in intensive care unit admissions (roughly 1,132) in Californian hospitals.

The New York City Department of Corrections reports that about two dozen unclaimed bodies are being buried each day at a mass grave on Hart Island. US immunologist Anthony Fauci warns that it is too early to roll back restrictions despite progress in combating the coronavirus pandemic in New York.

The Secretary-General of the United Nations António Guterres warns the United Nations Security Council that the coronavirus pandemic is threatening international peace and security, "potentially leading to an increase in social unrest and violence that would greatly undermine our ability to fight the disease."

The International Monetary Fund (IMF) approves a disbursement of US$147 million under its Rapid Financing Instrument to help Gabon combat the impact of the coronavirus.

Google and Apple Inc. announce that they will work together to develop an app for tracking coronavirus infections using existing Bluetooth and encryption technology.

=== 11 April ===
Ecuadorian President Lenin Moreno announces the creation of a humanitarian assistance fund that will be funded by citizens and companies to alleviate the economic effects of COVID-19.

US public broadcaster Voice of America has rejected the Trump Administration's allegation that it is promoting Chinese propaganda by tweeting a video of celebrations at the end of Wuhan's quarantine measures, and observing the US had surpassed China's death toll.

Mayor of New York Bill de Blasio announces that public schools will remain closed for the duration of the school year in order to combat the coronavirus pandemic. New York has reported the highest rate of infections and deaths in the United States.

The United States Department of Defense announces that it will be invoking the Defense Production Act and investing US$133 million to increase US domestic N95 mask production by over 39 million over the next 90 days.

The Uruguayan Government announces that it will be repatriating 16 New Zealanders and 96 Australians who had been stranded aboard the cruise ship Greg Mortimer in the La Plata river near Montevideo since 27 March. The passengers will be flown from Montevideo to Melbourne. The New Zealand Government has arranged to fly their nationals back to Auckland on a chartered flight.

=== 12 April ===
The United States Internal Revenue Service announces that the first coronavirus stimulus checks have been deposited in taxpayers' accounts. These economic relief payments are part of a US$2.2 trillion package passed by Congress to help people and businesses affected by the coronavirus pandemic. Most adults will get US$1,200 while parents will receive $500 for each qualifying child.

US Commissioner of Food and Drugs Stephen Hahn announces that the Trump Administration is considering relaxing "stay-home" restrictions of 1 May.

=== 13 April ===
Ecuadorian police remove 800 bodies from homes in the Pacific port city of Guayaquil, the worst-hit locality in the country.

United States President Donald Trump releases a campaign-style video during the daily White House Coronavirus Task Force briefing defending his Administration's response to the COVID-19 pandemic. US immunologist Anthony Fauci said that President Trump listened to his advice about the mitigation efforts needed to stop the spread of COVID-19.

Top Democratic Congressional leaders Senate Minority Leader Chuck Schumer and Speaker of the United States House of Representatives Nancy Pelosi call on the Republican Party to work on new bipartisan legislation citing a lack of funding for the national testing needed to restart the US economy.

The International Monetary Fund announces that it would provide immediate debt relief to 25 member countries under its "Catastrophe Containment and Relief Trust." The IMF is seeking to raise US$1.4 billion for that fund.

=== 14 April ===
In Brazil, the Governor of Rio de Janeiro Wilson Witzel tests positive for the coronavirus.

Governor of New York Andrew Cuomo disputes President Donald Trump's claim of "total authority" to reopen the United States' economy, which has gone into lockdown as a result of COVID-19. In addition, American immunologist and head of the National Institute of Allergy and Infectious Diseases Anthony Fauci warns that it is too early for the US Government to consider reopening the economy due to the coronavirus pandemic.

United States President Trump announces that the US will be withholding funding to the World Health Organization temporarily, alleging that the international organisation had neglected its duties and spread Chinese propaganda. Trump's decision was criticized by UN Secretary General António Guterres, Dr Patrice Harris of the American Medical Association, infectious disease expert Dr. Amesh Adalja of Johns Hopkins University, and Dr. William Schaffner of Vanderbilt University. Trump's decision was also criticized by the Chinese and German governments, the European Union, WHO Director-General Tedros Adhanom, and Speaker of the House Nancy Pelosi.

United States Army General Mark A. Milley, the chairman of the Joint Chiefs of Staff, issues a statement that US intelligence services indicate that the coronavirus originated naturally rather than being created in a Chinese laboratory as suggested by various conspiracy theories.

The International Monetary Fund's Chief Economist Gita Gopinath describes the economic fallout of the COVID-19 pandemic as the "worst recession" since the Great Depression in a foreword for the international organisation's World Economic Outlook. The IMF has also reported that it has loaned US$1 trillion to a hundred developing and under-developed countries affected by the coronavirus pandemic.

Apple, Inc. launches a site to help public health authorities to track down people's travel movements to ensure they are complying with lockdown requirements. According to the company, the data is gathered by counting the number of routing requests from Apple Maps, which is installed on all iPhones and comparing it with past usage to detect changes in the volume of people driving, walking or taking public transit around the world.

=== 15 April ===
The Brazilian Health Secretary Wanderson de Oliveira resigns following disagreements between President Jair Bolsonaro and Health Minister Luiz Henrique Mandetta over Brazil's handling of the coronavirus pandemic.

Colombian Justice Minister Margarita Cabello announces that 4,000 prisoners will be released from prison and placed under house arrest in a bid to combat the spread of COVID-19.

Robert Redfield, the Director of the United States Centers for Disease Control and Prevention (CDC), suggests that 19-20 US states that have experienced "limited impact" from the coronavirus may be able to reopen by President Donald Trump's 1 May target date.

=== 16 April ===
Brazilian President Jair Bolsonaro dismisses Health Minister Luiz Henrique Mandetta due disagreements over measures to combat the coronavirus. Bolsonaro appoints Nelson Teich as Brazil's new Health Minister.

The Governors of New York and Maryland order residents to wear face masks in public spaces. The Governors of Connecticut and Pennsylvania are also recommending that residents wear face masks. Governor of New York Andrew Cuomo also extends his state's shutdown order until 15 May in order to combat the spread of the coronavirus.

US President Donald Trump and Secretary of State Mike Pompeo have pressed China about to "come clean" about the origins of the coronavirus. Defense Secretary Mark Esper also accused the Chinese leadership of being "opaque and misleading" about the coronavirus outbreak. In response, Chinese Foreign Ministry spokesperson Zhao Lijian has asserted that the World Health Organization has found no evidence that the coronavirus was created in a laboratory.

US President Trump has also released a roadmap for US governors to reopen the US economy in phases.

The US Congress passes a coronavirus relief bill that will increase the federal budget deficit by US$1.8 trillion over the next cade. 17 Republican Members of Congress have also supported President Trump's decision to withhold aid to the World Health Organization. They propose demanding that WHO Director-General Tedros Adhanom resign as a condition for resuming US contributions to the international organization.

The United States Government reports that 5.2 million American workers have become unemployed since last week.

=== 17 April ===
Canadian Prime Minister Justin Trudeau announces that Canada's border restrictions will remain in place "for a significant amount of time" in order to combat the spread of the coronavirus. Deputy Prime Minister Freeland further elaborated and said, "Decisions about Canada's border are taken by Canadians. Full stop."

The Guatemalan Government reports that 44 out of 76 Guatemalans deported on one flight from the United States have tested positive for the coronavirus. The Guatemalan Foreign Minister Pedro Brolo later announced that Guatemala had suspended deportation flights but neglected to mention whether it was linked to the coronavirus outbreak.

The United States Navy's Surgeon General Bruce Gillingham announces that sailors aboard the USS Theodore Roosevelt will be subject to a serology test that will test whether sailors have contracted the coronavirus and developed antibodies in response to it.

US President Donald Trump has tweeted in support of anti-lockdown protests in the states of Minnesota, Michigan, and Virginia protesting against state lockdown orders. In response, Washington Governor Jay Inslee has accused Trump of "fomenting domestic rebellion and spreading lies."

=== 18 April ===
The Canadian Transportation Agency announces that all airline passengers will be required to wear a face mask or covering to help combat the spread of the coronavirus.

Guatemalan President Alejandro Giammattei suspends the flights of all deportees from the United States after tests indicated that several passengers aboard a flight from the US tested positive for the coronavirus.

Mexican President Andrés Manuel López Obrador issues a Twitter message stating that US President Donald Trump had promised to help Mexico buy 1,000 ventilators and other intensive therapy equipment used for treating severe cases of the coronavirus.

In the United States, there have been reports of protests against stay-at-home orders in Concord, New Hampshire; Annapolis, Maryland; and Austin, Texas. During his daily briefing, US President Donald Trump stated that China should face consequences if they were "knowingly responsible" for the coronavirus pandemic.

Amazon has started using thermal cameras to screen workers at its warehouses in order to detect cases of the coronavirus.

=== 19 April ===
Hundreds have protested against lockdown restrictions imposed by state governors in the Brazilian cities of Rio de Janeiro, São Paulo and the capital Brasília. Brazilian President Jair Bolsonaro has criticized the lockdown measures, claiming that the "fear was excessive" and that people want a return to normality.

Honduran security minister Jair Meza has extended the country's curfew until 26 April in an attempt to curb the spread of the coronavirus.

Panama has detained about 1,700 undocumented migrants heading to the United States in a jungle camp in La Penita near the Colombian border after 17 coronavirus cases were detected among them. These infected individuals have been removed from the camp, whose facilities are designed to host 200 people.

US President Donald Trump and Turkish President Recep Tayyip Erdoğan agreed to continue their close bilateral cooperation to combat the coronavirus during a phone interview. Governor of New York Andrew Cuomo issued a statement, stating that the outbreak in New York state is "on the descent." President Trump has also reiterated a US offer to help Iran deal with the coronavirus pandemic if Tehran requested it.

The World Health Organization and non-profit NGO Global Citizen have sponsored a two-hour One World: Together at Home television broadcast program featuring several celebrities and public figures including Jimmy Kimmel, Stephen Colbert, Jimmy Fallon, Lady Gaga, Paul McCartney, the Rolling Stones, Beyoncé, Elton John, Stevie Wonder, David Beckham and former US First Ladies Michelle Obama and Laura Bush. These celebrities and public figures will be sharing music, comedy, and personal stories from their own homes.

=== 20 April ===
Brazilian President Jair Bolsonaro has called for Brazil's stay-at-home measures to end this week, claiming that the policy was killing jobs.

United States Vice President Mike Pence has stated that the United States has sufficient testing capacity nationwide to allow any of the states to start lifting lockdown orders provided that they meet the other criteria for relaxation including 14 days of declining infections and having enough hospital capacity to treat the sick.

Acting United States Secretary of Homeland Security Chad Wolf announced that the United States, Canada, and Mexico will be restricting non-essential travel across their borders in order to combat the spread of the coronavirus.

Swiss pharmaceutical company Novartis gains approval from the United States Food and Drug Administration to conduct a randomised trial of the malaria drug hydroxychloroquine against the coronavirus.

The New York State Nurses Association sues New York state and two hospitals, alleging that their members were exposed to hazardous working conditions including nurses being forced to work when sick and insufficient PPE equipment.

The United Nations Office for the Coordination of Humanitarian Affairs has issued an urgent call for US$350 million to support the global emergency supply system coordinated by the World Food Programme to ensure that supplies reach impoverished countries.

Facebook has removed some posts by groups fomenting protests against stay-at-home orders in California, New Jersey and Nebraska after consulting with state officials.

=== 21 April ===
Governor of Maryland Larry Hogan stated that his state had obtained 500,000 tests from South Korea following negotiations and criticized the federal government for not providing states with the resources to cope with the coronavirus pandemic. In response, US President Trump criticized Larry Hogan and other state governors, claiming that the US had sufficient resources for coronavirus testing.

United States President Donald Trump announces that he will sign an executive order to temporarily suspend all immigration into the United States to combat the spread of the coronavirus, which he described as "the attack from the invisible enemy." This Executive Order will last for 90 days and deny entry to most work visa holders with the exception of healthcare and medical professionals, and those working in the food industries. In addition, there will be a sixty-day ban on those seeking permanent residency status.

The United States Senate has unanimously passed legislation establishing a US$484 billion program to support small businesses affected by the coronavirus pandemic, hospitals, and a national testing impetus.

The United Nations General Assembly unanimously adopted a Mexican resolution backed by the United States calling for "equitable, efficient and timely access to any future vaccines developed to fight the coronavirus." That same day, the UNGA passed another resolution calling for global action to develop and improve access to medicines, vaccines and equipment to battle the pandemic and closer cooperation between the UN and World Health Organization.

=== 22 April ===
Mexican President Andrés Manuel López Obrador has announced that the Mexican Government will invest 622.6 billion Mexican pesos (US$25.6 billion) into social programmes and critical projects to combat the fallout of the coronavirus.

Following a meeting between US President Donald Trump and New York Governor Andrew Cuomo, the President agreed that the federal government would help New York to obtain enough chemical reagents to double the state's testing capacity to 40,000 tests a day. Cuomo has also announced plans to expand contact tracing in New York state in coordination with authorities in New Jersey and Connecticut and support from Bloomberg L.P.

Robert R. Redfield, the Director of the Centers for Disease Control and Prevention (CDC) has warned that a second wave of the coronavirus could be more destructive because it could collide with the flu season; he strongly encouraged people to get their flu jabs.

The United States Agency for International Development's Acting-Administrator John Barsa announces that the US Government will assess the way that the World Health Organization is being run.

Missouri has filed a lawsuit against the Chinese Government over its handling of the coronavirus, claiming that China's response to the outbreak has brought devastating economic losses to the state. In response, the Chinese Foreign Ministry has dismissed the allegation as "nothing short of absurdity" and lacking legal or factual merit. In addition, United States Secretary of State Michael Pompeo has accused Beijing of delaying to report human-to-human transmission of the coronavirus for a month until it had spread to every province in China.

US medical company Indutex USA George Gianforcaro has protested the Federal Emergency Management Agency's decision to seize 400,000 N95 respirator masks meant for domestic customers.

The Montreal-based International Civil Aviation Organization has estimated that global air travel could drop by as many as 1.2 billion travellers by September 2020.

Streaming giant Netflix has reported that subscriptions have increased by 15.8 million between January and March 2020 due to people staying at home to comply with lockdown orders.

The World Health Organization's Director-General Tedros Adhanom has expressed concern about the coronavirus' "upward trends" in parts of Africa, Central America, and South America and the management of international air travel. Adhanom has also urged Washington to reconsider its decision to suspend funding to the international organisation.

=== 23 April ===
In Canada, the Premier of Ontario Doug Ford and the Premier of Quebec Francois Legault have requested assistance from the Canadian Armed Forces in response to overstretched human resources at Canadian rest homes.

United States President Donald Trump has criticized Georgian Governor Brian Kemp's decision to allow some non-essential businesses to reopen. In the United States, a total of 26 million people have applied for unemployment benefits in the last five weeks. According to the Fuller Project, two-thirds of unemployment claims were filed by women.

The United States House of Representatives passes a US$484 billion coronavirus relief bill supporting small businesses and hospitals by 388–5. The House of Representatives, which is controlled by the Democratic Party, also approved the creation of a special advisory panel to investigate the federal government's response to the coronavirus pandemic.

The U.S. Immigration and Customs Enforcement announces that it will test 2,000 immigration detainees for the coronavirus in response to a spate of outbreaks among deportees who had returned to Mexico and Guatemala.

New York Governor Andrew Cuomo announced that a random screening of 3,000 residents found that 13.9% have tested positive for antibodies for the coronavirus, suggesting that about 2.7 million people in the state have been affected.

United Nations Secretary-General António Guterres has released a report advocating that human rights should play a key role in guiding the response of states to the coronavirus pandemic. Guterres has also warned against the rise of hate speech, the targeting of vulnerable communities, and the danger of states adopting repressive measures in response to the coronavirus pandemic.

=== 24 April ===
The Legislative Assembly of El Salvador has been evacuated after the Interdisciplinary Epidemiological Control Team detected a "serious suspicion" of the coronavirus in the Assembly's "blue living room."

Haiti has received 129 of its nationals on a deportation flight from the United States. The Haitian Government had requested that the United States test all deportees for the coronavirus but US authorities only agreed to test those with symptoms. Returnees will be quarantined in a quarantine facility for two weeks.

US President Donald Trump attracts controversy and criticism for remarks suggesting that the coronavirus could be treated by injecting disinfectant into the body. In response, Trump has said that his remarks were sarcastic. Trump and Vice President Mike Pence left a press conference early.

William N. Bryan, the Acting Under Secretary of Homeland Security for Science and Technology, draws media attention for claiming that sunlight, heat and humidity weaken the coronavirus.

The United States Department of Health and Human Services has announced that the Centers for Disease Control and Prevention (CDC) will be releasing US$631 million to state and local governments to assist with COVID-19 relief efforts.

Mayor of San Francisco London Breed said the city order's for PPE from China were instead rerouted to France and to FEMA. "We had isolation gowns on the way to San Francisco and then diverted to France," she said. Another order of equipment went through customs and then was "confiscated" by FEMA for other places. She later stated "That at the height of this pandemic we are still having a conversation about PPE really does blow my mind. There has been nothing that has been more frustrating."

=== 25 April ===
In Argentina, prisoners at Devoto prison in Buenos Aires have rioted to demand urgent health measures after a coronavirus case was confirmed at the facility.

Canadian Prime Minister Justin Trudeau clarified that plans to restart the economies of Canadian provinces do not hinge upon the presumption that people who have recovered from the coronavirus develop an immunity to it.

The Maryland Emergency Management Agency has issued a Twitter alert advising residents that no disinfectant product should be administered through the body via "injection, ingestion or any other route." New York City has also reported 30 cases of disinfectant ingestion following Trump's remarks yesterday.

The United States Department of the Treasury has disbursed US$9.5 billion in additional funds from the Payroll Support Program to US airliners, bringing the total amount of aid provided to the sector to US$12.4 million. 93 US air carriers have applied and received government financial assistance in response to the coronavirus pandemic.

=== 26 April ===
Health Canada has advised against using the malaria drugs hydroxychloroquine and chloroquine to prevent or treat COVID-19. The Chief Public Health Officer of Canada Theresa Tam has welcomed the declining coronavirus death toll while Canadian Prime Minister Justin Trudeau says that isolation measures should remain in place for now.

The Honduras Government has extended a blanket curfew to contain the spread of the coronavirus by one week until 3 p.m. on 3 May.

Governor of California Gavin Newsom has urged beachgoers in southern California to abide by social distancing guidelines.

=== 27 April ===
Brazilian Productivity and competition secretary Carlos da Costa has announced that the Brazilian Government is working on a plan to open up the Brazilian economy including allowing professional football matches behind closed doors.

The Mexican Government has confirmed that senior civil servant Irma Erendira Sandoval, the head of the country's public administration ministry, has tested positive for the coronavirus.

United States President Donald Trump has dismissed media reports that he is planning to dismiss Health Secretary Alex Azar as "fake news" in a Tweet. White House Adviser and Director of the Office of Trade and Manufacturing Policy Peter Navarro has confirmed that the Trump Administration is exploring protocols for keeping factories open during the coronavirus pandemic including social distancing, screening workers, and reconfiguring factories. Trump later attacked several Democratic–administered states and cities as being "poorly-run". His remarks coincided with a push by state governors seeking a US$500 million federal economic package. Trump also addressed a brief press conference focusing on how states could expand coronavirus testing and efforts to reopen the economy. He also announced that the US was investigating China's response to the coronavirus pandemic, the reopening of some schools, and North Korean leader Kim Jong Un.

The United States Small Business Administration has lent an extra US$2 billion to small businesses through its Paycheck Protection Program after a number of borrowers in the first round of funding for the coronavirus declined or returned their loans.

US House Majority Leader Steny Hoyer announced that the United States House of Representatives will resume session on 4 May.

Californian Governor Gavin Newsom announced that law enforcement authorities would step up the enforcement of coronavirus-related restrictions after crowds visited beaches over the weekend.

New York Governor Andrew Cuomo has extended a stay-at-home order in much of the state until 15 May but indicated that restrictions could be waived in areas with sufficient hospital capacity. New York state officials also cancelled the 2020 New York Democratic primary due to health and safety concerns.

Swedish Ambassador to the United States Karin Ulrika Olofsdotter also stated that Sweden could reach herd immunity by May during an interview with National Public Radio.

The World Health Organization's top emergency expert Michael Ryan has described the US federal government's plan to combat the coronavirus pandemic as "very clearly-laid out" and "science-based", complimenting the cooperation between the federal and state governments.

=== 28 April ===
Quebec Premier Francois Legault has announced plans to gradually reopen Quebec's economy in May while maintaining social distancing restrictions.

Governor of New York Andrew Cuomo has announced that the number of hospital admissions has dropped to its lowest level in more than a month. He also clarified that regions in New York state wanting to reopen would need to have a hospital capacity rate below 70% and a transmission rate below 1.1%.

United States President Donald Trump has announced that the US Government is considering testing passengers on international flights for the coronavirus.

=== 29 April ===
A pug named Winston became the first pet dog in the United States to test positive for COVID-19. Winston's family had taken part in Duke University's Molecular and Epidemiological Study of Suspected Infection research study.

The United States Department of Commerce has reported that the United States' gross domestic product declined at a 4.8% in the period between January and March 2020.

The United States Secretary of State Mike Pompeo has claimed that Chinese laboratories lack adequate security to prevent future pandemics during a State Department press conference.

Alphabet Inc.'s Chief Financial Officer Ruth Porat has reported a decline in advertising revenue due to a drop in Google users searching for commercial topics on the search engine.

Boeing CEO David Calhoun has announced that it plans to lay off ten percent of its workforce and to reduce production of its main commercial planes after reporting a first-quarter US$641 million loss as a result of the economic impact of the coronavirus on the airline sector.

Gilead Sciences has announced that its experimental anti-virus drug remdesivir has helped COVID-19 patients during a clinical trial. US President Donald Trump has welcome the news while immunologist and White House Coronavirus Task Force member Anthony Fauci has advised caution.

=== 30 April ===
United States President Donald Trump claimed that he had seen evidence that the coronavirus originated in the Wuhan Institute of Virology. That same day, US intelligence agencies concluded that the coronavirus was neither "man-made or genetically modified" but that they were still investigating whether the pandemic originated with infected animals or an accident at the Wuhan laboratory.

Californian Governor Gavin Newsom has ordered the closure of the state's beaches and parks from 1 May after large crowds visited them the previous weekend, violating social distancing rules.

New York Governor Andrew Cuomo issued a statement that he would need between 6,400 and 17,000 people to contact trace people who had contracted the coronavirus.

The United States Department of Labor has reported an additional 3.8 million unemployment claims last week, bringing the total number of unemployed to more than 30 million.

The International Monetary Fund has approved US$650 million in emergency assistance to the Dominican Republic.

Médecins Sans Frontières has criticized the United States Government for threatening trade sanctions against several countries that Washington has accused of not protecting intellectual properties in the pharmaceutical sector including India, Brazil, China, Chile, and Canada.

NASCAR executive vice-president Steve O'Donnell announced that NASCAR's racing season will resume on 17 May at Darlington Raceway in Darlington, South Carolina.

US pharmaceutical company Pfizer's vaccines head Nanette Cocero has announced that the company aims to produce 10-20 million doses of a coronavirus vaccine that it is developing with the German company BioNtech for possible emergency use depending on the vaccine trial results.

The United Nations Secretary-General António Guterres issued a statement criticizing the lack of leadership by world powers and raising concern about the inadequate support for the fight against the coronavirus in poor countries.

== Reactions and measures in Eastern Mediterranean ==
=== 1 April ===
The Qatari Ministry of Administrative Development, Labour and Social Affairs (MADLSA) announced that workers in quarantine and treatment across the country would be paid in full, ordering employers and companies to follow government policy and creating a hotline for workers to voice their grievances.

Turkey sent a military airplane carrying masks, face gears, eye gears, overalls and anti-bacterial fluids to Spain and Italy.

=== 2 April ===
Iranian authorities closed streets and shops in the capital Tehran to help contain the spread of the coronavirus.

In Lebanon, the Human Rights Watch NGO criticized Lebanese municipal authorities for imposing discriminatory measures against Syrian refugees including curfews.

The Saudi Ministry of Interior imposed a 24-hour curfew on Mecca and Medina. Besides essential workers, residents would be allowed to buy groceries and access medical care.

The United Arab Emirates government allowed national carrier Emirates to launch a number of flights from 6 April to repatriate visitors and expatriates to their home countries.

=== 3 April ===
Saudi Arabia extended the starting date of a 24-hour curfew to 3pm on Friday in Dammam, Ta'if and al-Qatif in order to combat the coronavirus. King Salman invests 9 billion riyals (US$2.3 billion) in financial support for 1.2 million Saudi citizens working in the private sector.

=== 4 April ===
Bahrain reopens Bahrain International Airport to transit by international travelers but limits entry to citizens and residents.

President of Egypt Abdel Fattah el-Sisi postpones several megaprojects including the Grand Egyptian Museum and moving the capital from Cairo to a new planned city.

Prime Minister of Pakistan Imran Khan issued a statement on Twitter that the Indian subcontinent faced a difficult choice of having to balance between imposing a lockdown to contain the spread of the coronavirus and ensuring that people would not die of hunger and the economy would not collapse.

Saudi Arabia imposes a lockdown and partial curfew in seven neighbourhoods in Jeddah. Residents in the affected neighbourhoods can only obtain groceries and medical services between 6am and 3pm local time.

The Tunisian Assembly of the Representatives of the People ceded power to Prime Minister Elyes Fakhfakh's government for two months, allowing them to issue decrees, sign purchase agreements and seek finance without consulting parliament.

The United Arab Emirates extends an overnight curfew indefinitely, requiring people to stay at home between 8pm and 6am local time. During the curfew, UAE authorities will disinfect streets, parks, and public transport facilities.

=== 5 April ===
The United Arab Emirates' Cabinet announces that it will strengthen the country's "strategic stockpile." The country's Vice President and Prime Minister Mohammed bin Rashid Al Maktoum announces that factories will be redirected to supporting the country's health sector.

=== 6 April ===
Iranian Foreign Ministry spokesperson Abbas Mousavi announces that Iran will not seek American help and demands that Washington lifts its sanctions against Iran. The Supreme Leader of Iran Ali Khamenei announces the withdrawal of €1 billion from the country's sovereign wealth fund to invest in Iran's health services and the unemployment insurance fund.

Saudi Arabia imposes 24-hour lockdowns on the governorates of Jeddah, Taif, Qatif and Khobar, and the cities of Riyadh, Tabuk, Dammam, Dhahran and Hofuf.

=== 7 April ===
Radio New Zealand and Reuters report that over 20,000 Pakistani migrant workers are stranded in the United Arab Emirates. ACF Animal Rescue rescue pet cats, dogs, and rabbits from an abandoned pet market in Karachi's Empress Market.

The Tunisian Interior Ministry warns that people infected with the coronavirus can be prosecuted for manslaughter if they do not abide by governmental directives to self-isolate and cross-contaminate others.

=== 8 April ===
Egyptian Prime Minister Mostafa Madbouly extends a nighttime curfew, that will start at 8pm, until 23 April to combat the spread of coronavirus. The country's airports will remain closed.

The Iranian President Hassan Rouhani appeals to the International Monetary Fund to give the country the US$5 billion emergency loan that Tehran had requested to fight the coronavirus pandemic.

The Jordanian Finance Minister Mohammed Al Ississ states that Jordan will be able to repay its foreign debt obligations despite the loss of economic revenue caused by the coronavirus pandemic.

The Lebanese Ministry of Social Affairs launches a 75 billion Lebanese pound aid relief programme. This includes a one-time cash assistance of 400,000 Lebanese pounds (US$140) to about 187,500 families.

The Pakistani Government announces that it plans to increase its daily COVID-19 testing capacity to at least 25,000 tests a day by late April and to increase the supply of personal equipment to doctors from 9 April.

In the United Arab Emirates, the Emirate of Dubai's justice department suspends marriages and divorces as a result of the COVID-19 pandemic.

=== 9 April ===
Iranian Supreme Leader Ali Khamenei urges Iranians to spend Ramadan at home during the lockdown. Public gatherings are banned while schools and universities have been closed.

The Pakistani government distributes a one-time Rs12,000 (US$70) grant to 12 million low-income families.

=== 10 April ===
The Jordanian Armed Forces arrested the owner of Ro'ya TV and its news director for airing a news story showing a crowd of labourers complaining about their inability to work as a result of the country's coronavirus lockdown.

Pakistan begins distributing Rs144 billion (US$863 million) in cash grants to low income families across the country. In the first phase, the Government disbursed roughly US$300 million to banks which distributed Rs12,000 (US$70) grants to low income families.

=== 11 April ===
In Iran, "low risk" businesses in most parts of the country except Tehran are allowed to reopen. However, President Hassan Rouhani urged Iranians to comply with social distancing and other health protocols.

=== 12 April ===
The Egyptian Government postpones its bid to sell its stake in the state owned Banque du Caire due to the spread of the coronavirus.

The Jordanian Government extends a month-long lockdown until the end of April.

Saudi Arabia orders an extension of the country's curfew until further notice.

United Arab Emirates airliner Etihad Airways announces that it will operate special flights to Brussels, Dublin, London, Tokyo and Zurich between 14 and 22 April. This was in response to the UAE government stating that it would allow a number of limited outbound flights for those wishing to leave the country.

The Organization of the Petroleum Exporting Countries, Russia and several oil producing countries agree to reduce output by 9.7 million barrels per day (roughly 10%) in order to support oil prices amid the COVID-19 pandemic.

=== 13 April ===
In Yemen, Houthi–linked chief prosecutor announced that the group has released 2,361 prisoners since mid-March as part of precautionary measures against the spread of COVID-19.

=== 14 April ===
The Pakistani Government extends its lockdown to schools, shopping malls, public gatherings and non-essential work for two weeks but makes exceptions for certain economic sectors such as construction, cement and fertiliser plants, mines, glass manufacturers, veterinary services, bookshops and stationary stores, dry cleaners and some agriculture-related businesses.

Turkey's Parliament announces that it has approved legislation to release 90,000 prisoners in a bid to ease overcrowding in prisons and prevent the spread of COVID-19.

=== 15 April ===
The Omani Ministry of Finance orders all ministry and civilian government units to reduce approved liquidity for development budgets by ten percent. It also ordered a halt to the creation of government companies performing commercial activity in order to give priority to the private sector.

Jordanian Prime Minister Omar Razzaz announces that the Jordanian Government will ease lockdown measures to allow more businesses and industries to resume work but will not yet live a curfew restricting movement.

In Libya, the Tripoli–based Government of National Accord imposes a 24-hour curfew for ten days in order to combat the spread of the coronavirus.

The Pakistani Government relaxes lockdown restrictions on key industries including the lockdown sector in order to minimise the economic damage caused by the lockdown.

The Qatari Government expels several Nepalese workers for alleged "illegal, illicit activity." In response to criticism by Amnesty International, Qatar has defended the repatriation, claiming the workers had broken the law.

At the G20 virtual summit hosted in Riyadh, Saudi Arabia, the G20 group of countries and private creditors agree to suspend debt repayments from developing countries for the duration of the coronavirus pandemic.

The United Nations Economic and Social Commission for Western Asia reports that about 71 million people in the Arab world lack access to running water, increasing their risk of contracting the coronavirus.

=== 16 April ===
The Gulf Cooperation Council approves Kuwait's proposal for a common network for food supply safety following an online meeting of trade and industry ministers.

The Jordanian Prime Minister Omar Razzaz admits that his country's finances had been strained by the coronavirus pandemic, derailing the country's capital investment plan to boost sluggish growth and attract investment.

Lebanese Prime Minister Hassan Diab states that 98% of Jordan's depositors will not be affected by an economic rescue plan which includes a proposal to fund some losses with a contribution from deposits.

The Saudi Arabian Government announces that it will pledge US$500 million to support international efforts to combat the coronavirus pandemic and to help bridge a US$8 billion financing gap. This includes investing US$150m to the Coalition for Epidemic Preparedness and Innovation, US$150m to the Global Alliance for Vaccines and Immunisation, and US$200m to other health organisations and programmes.

=== 17 April ===
Saudi Minister of Finance Mohammed Al-Jadaan issues a statement that Saudi Arabia is in a good financial position to tackle the coronavirus pandemic due to its strong financial reserves and low national debt. The Grand Mufti Sheikh Abdulaziz al-Sheikh advises that Muslim evening prayers for Ramadan and the Eid al-Fitr feast should be performed at home for the duration of the coronavirus pandemic.

The Emirate of Dubai extends a 24-hour curfew by one week.

=== 18 April ===
The Iranian Government has allowed businesses in Tehran and some nearby towns to reopen on Saturday after weeks of lockdown. Gyms, restaurants, Tehran's grand bazaar, shrines and mosques remain closed while a ban on public gathering remains in force.

The Moroccan Government extended the country's lockdown until 20 May.

The Pakistani Government lifted restrictions on congregations at mosques, which allowed only three to five people for prayers.

The United Arab Emirates Government announces that it will fine people up to 20,000 dirhams (US$5,500) if they disseminate "fake news" about the coronavirus including medical information that violates official advice about the coronavirus.

=== 19 April ===
Pakistani Prime Minister Imran Khan bows to pressure from religious scholars to keep mosques open for the duration of the Ramadan period. This decision came in response to threats by religious scholars to organise mass protests in defiance of the Pakistani Government's attempts to close mosques in response to the coronavirus pandemic. The Pakistani Consulate-General in Dubai announced that the first Pakistan International Airlines flight carrying 227 Pakistani nationals stranded in Dubai and the Northern Emirates had departed for Pakistan that morning at 0700 local time.

Tunisian Prime Minister Elyes Fakhfakh extends Tunisia's lockdown until 4 May.

The Saudi Council of Senior Scholars advises Muslims to pray at home and avoid public gatherings during Ramadan if their countries require social distancing in order to prevent the spread of the coronavirus.

In the United Arab Emirates, organizers of Dubai's Arabian Travel Market, which was scheduled to be held from 28 June to 1 July, have cancelled the event citing health and safety concerns.

=== 20 April ===
The Bahraini Government has announced that it will slash spending by government ministries and agencies by 30 percent to help the country weather the coronavirus pandemic including delaying some construction and consulting projects.

The Iranian Government has begun reopening intercity highways and major shopping centres to stimulate its crippled economy. Shops in Tehran's Grand Bazaar have been allowed to reopen up to 6pm local time.

The Kuwaiti Government has extended the suspension of work in the public sector until 31 May and expanded the nationwide curfew to 16 hours (4pm to 8 am) in order to combat the spread of the coronavirus.

The Pakistani Government has announced that it will be shifting from a general lockdown to "smart lockdowns" focusing on coronavirus hotspots. The Government will use contact tracing and testing to identify such hotspots for "smart lockdowns."

Saudi Arabia extends the suspension of praying in the Great Mosque and Al-Masjid an-Nabawi during Ramadan to combat the spread of COVID-19.

=== 21 April ===
President of Afghanistan Ashraf Ghani and his wife Rula Ghani have tested negative for the coronavirus. At least forty presidential palace staff have tested positive for the coronavirus.

The Iranian Government has temporarily released a thousand foreign prisoners including British-Iranian woman Nazanin Zaghari-Ratcliffe in response to pressure from human rights groups.

The Iraqi Government has announced that it will temporarily ease the 24-hour curfew ahead of Ramadan. The new curfew will be imposed mainly at night from 7pm until 6 am local time between 21 April and 11 May. However, a total ban will take place on Fridays and Saturdays.

The Lebanese Parliament was relocated to a makeshift theatre to allow social distancing. Legislators were sprayed with disinfectant and had their temperatures taken.

The Saudi Press Agency has announced that the Saudi Arabian Government intends to ease curfew restrictions it has imposed on several cities to allow more people to shop for essentials within their neighbourhoods during the Ramadan period.

=== 22 April ===
The Israeli Defense Minister Naftali Bennett has cancelled an Israeli Army initiative to test coronavirus samples coming from the Hamas-controlled Gaza Strip.

Lebanese authorities have placed the Wavel refugee camp in the eastern Bekaa valley under lockdown after a Syrian-Palestinian man tested positive for the coronavirus, becoming the first confirmed case in one of the country's refugee camps.

Pakistani President Imran Khan has undergone testing for the coronavirus after he came into contact with infected philanthropist Faisal Edhi. Khan subsequently tested negative for the coronavirus.

In Saudi Arabia, the Presidency of the Two Holy Mosques has announced that King Salman has approved performing the Tarawih at the two Holy Mosques but that entry for pilgrims will remain suspended.

=== 23 April ===
The Egyptian Government will maintain a nighttime curfew during the Ramadan period but will delay the start of the curfew from 8pm to 9pm to allow one extra hour of movement.

Pakistani Prime Minister Imran Khan has confirmed that US President Donald Trump has offered to assist Pakistani efforts to combat the coronavirus including providing ventilators and unspecified economic assistance. Khan also intends to launch a US$595 million appeal to fund Pakistan's "Preparedness and Response Plan to COVID-19", mainly lobbying international financial institutions and world powers.

In the United Arab Emirates, Dubai has allowed cafes and restaurants to resume operations. Shopping malls will also be reopened from 12 pm to 10 pm but with a maximum capacity of 30 percent. Public transportation services including the metro will resume on 26 April.

=== 24 April ===
The Lebanese High Defence Council has advised the Lebanese Government to extend the nationwide lockdown until 10 May but to gradually ease restrictions over the coming weeks. The Lebanese Government has extended the national lockdown until 10 May but has shortened the curfew by one hour from 8pm to 5am. Lebanon also announced a five-stage plan to reopen the country on 28 April, 4 May, 11 May, 25 May, and 6 June. Physical distancing and wearing masks will remain compulsory for the duration of the lockdown.

Pakistani Prime Minister Imran Khan has confirmed that Pakistan is using a contact tracing system developed by the country's intelligence service Inter-Services Intelligence.

United States Secretary of State Mike Pompeo has urged Egyptian Foreign Minister Sameh Shoukry to ensure that American nationals detained in Egyptian prisons are kept safe during the coronavirus pandemic.

=== 25 April ===
The Abu Dhabi airliner Etihad has suspended passenger flights until 15 May.

=== 26 April ===
The Prime Minister of Egypt Mostafa Madbouly has announced that Egypt plans to negotiate a one-year financial support programme with the International Monetary Fund.

Saudi Arabian King Salman has ordered a partial lifting of the curfew in all regions of the country except Mecca and previously quarantined neighbourhoods. The curfew will be lifted between 9am and 5pm from Sunday onwards while malls, wholesale and retail shops will be allowed to reopen from 29 April onwards for a period of two weeks.

=== 27 April ===
In the disputed territory of Gaza, the economy ministry has allowed restaurants to reopen in order to ease the economic hardship caused by the coronavirus pandemic. Restaurants must observe social distancing rules.

Iranian President Hassan Rouhani has announced that Iran will be divided into green, red, and white zones based on the number of cases and deaths. Mosques located in the white zones will be allowed to reopen and resume Friday prayers.

The Pakistan Civil Aviation Authority has extended a ban on all international flights in and out of the country until 15 May. The only exceptions will be diplomatic, cargo flights, and special flights transporting stranded passengers.

=== 28 April ===
Egyptian President Abdel Fattah el-Sisi has renewed the country's national state of emergency by three months, citing health and security concerns. Egypt has been in a state of emergency since the Palm Sunday church bombings in early April 2017.

The United Nations Human Rights Commissioner Michelle Bachelet has called for the lifting of sanctions on Sudan to ease pressure on the country's health system during the coronavirus pandemic. The United Nations High Commissioner for Refugees has announced that it needs US$89.4 million to support refugee aid programs for Yemenis and other refugees in the midst of the coronavirus pandemic.

=== 29 April ===
Iranian President Hassan Rouhani has allowed the reopening of businesses despite the persistent coronavirus pandemic.

The Emir of Qatar Tamim bin Hamad Al Thani has dispatched medical supplies to Iran and Algeria to aid their efforts to combat the coronavirus pandemic.

The Tunisian Government has announced that it will ease lockdown restrictions to allow the reopening of the food, industry, construction and half the civil service sectors in early May. Clothing shops, shopping malls, and some public transportation will resume from 11 May.

The Abu Dhabi airline Etihad has delayed the resumption of passenger flights from 16 May until 16 June.

=== 30 April ===
Kuwaiti airlines Jazeera Airways has laid off 320 employees, or roughly 37% of its workforce. This includes cabin crew, ground staff, and support staff.

The Qatari Government has announced that it will be producing artificial respiratory machines to cope with domestic and international health demands in response to the coronavirus pandemic.

== Reactions and measures in Europe ==
=== 1 April ===
Albania extended a lockdown closing schools, eateries, and other public venues, which has been in force since mid-March and due to end on 3 April.

The 2020 United Nations Climate Change Conference, scheduled to be held in Glasgow in November 2020, was postponed to 2021. Israeli Prime Minister Benjamin Netanyahu ordered all Israeli citizens to wear face masks in public as part of national efforts to combat COVID-19.

President of Russia Vladimir Putin sent a military plane to the United States carrying medical supplies and masks to help the United States fight the coronavirus as a good will gesture to US President Trump. That same day, Putin approved legislation allowing the Russian government to declare a state of national emergency to combat the COVID-19 outbreak.

UK Housing Secretary Robert Jenrick announced that the British Government would aim to test 25,000 people a day by mid-April from its present capacity of 12,750 a day. The All England Lawn Tennis Club also announced that the Wimbledon tennis championship, scheduled to have been held between 29 June and 12 July, had been cancelled in response to the coronavirus pandemic.

The Union of European Football Associations suspended all Champions League and Europa League matches due to the coronavirus pandemic.

The Championships, Wimbledon was cancelled for the first time since 1945.

Reporters without Borders launched its "Tracker 19" tool to document state censorship, disinformation and their effect on people's access to news and information during the COVID-19 global pandemic.

=== 2 April ===
Cyprus extended a ban on commercial flights with 28 countries for two weeks in order to contain the spread of the coronavirus.

German authorities reported that 1.1 million self-employed and small business had applied for financial assistance. The German government already paid €1 billion in financial assistance with another €1.8 billion being approved.

Greek authorities quarantined a migrant camp after 23 asylum seekers tested positive for the coronavirus.

In Ireland, Tánaiste Simon Coveney extended movement restrictions limiting travel to buying groceries, exercising, and essential family visits beyond 12 April. Israeli Minister of Health Yaakov Litzman and his wife tested positive for COVID-19. The Portuguese Assembly of the Republic extended the state of emergency by another 15 days in response to a sharp rise in the death toll to 200. Portuguese Prime Minister Antonio Costa also announced that airports would close between 9 and 13 April, allowing only flights repatriating citizens or transporting goods.

President of Romania Klaus Iohannis announced that Romanian doctors, nurses, and personnel dealing with the coronavirus pandemic would receive a monthly bonus of €500.

In Russia, Mayor of Moscow Sergei Sobyanin extended a partial lockdown and movement restrictions on residents until 1 May. Residents of Moscow, which has been experiencing a heavy caseload, have since Monday been allowed to leave their homes only to buy food or medicine nearby, get urgent medical treatment, walk the dog or take out the rubbish.

Spanish authorities released figures showing that 898,922 workers had lost their jobs since 12 March. Catalonian President Quim Torra appealed for help from the Spanish Army.

Mayor of Istanbul Ekrem İmamoğlu called for a lockdown in response to a spike in case to 15,000, with 60% occurring in Istanbul.

The Ukrainian government accepted Tesla CEO and philanthropist Elon Musk's offer to deliver ventilators to Ukraine.

UK Health Secretary Matt Hancock announced that the British Government would intend to build a diagnostics industry to test 100,000 people a day for the coronavirus. First Minister of Scotland Nicola Sturgeon admitted that the number of deaths in Scotland had been under-reported due to mistakes in notifying the Government about new fatalities. In response to a call by British Prime Minister Boris Johnson, several British engineers, aerospace and Formula One companies including BAE Systems, Rolls-Royce, Ford and Airbus announced that they would join forces to produce 1,500 ventilators.

=== 3 April ===
Albania imposed a 40-hour lockdown over the weekend in response to a spike in cases.

Airbus delivered 4 million masks from China to Europe.

The Bulgarian National Assembly extends a national state of emergency until 13 April.

French authorities converted a large refrigerated warehouse at the Rungis fresh food market into a temporary morgue to hold 1,000 bodies.

The Swedish health care company Mölnlycke announced that France had seized millions of face masks and gloves that the company imported from China to Spain and Italy. The company's general manager, Richard Twomey, denounced France for "confiscat[ing] masks and gloves even though it was not [its] own. This is an extremely disturbing, unbecoming act."

Greece quarantined a second migrant camp near Athens after a 53-year-old Afghan man tested positive for COVID-19. The Israeli government declared Bnei Brak a restricted zone due to the town's high rate of infections and placed the town under lockdown, limiting travel to and from the town. Israeli authorities also required that ritual washing for deceased Jewish and Muslim victims of COVID-19 be done by personnel wearing full protective gear to contain the spread of the disease. Swiss police surrounded Geneva's main prison after 40 prisoners refused to return to their cells, complaining about insufficient measures to combat the spread of the coronavirus.

Turkey imposed a partial curfew on Turkish citizens under the age of 20 years, which came into effect midnight. Turkish authorities also shut down the borders of 31 cities to most vehicles excluding those transporting essential supplies.

In the United Kingdom, the ExCel exhibition centre in London was opened as a temporary 4,000-bed hospital, branded 'NHS Nightingale' having been constructed over the previous nine days. It was opened by Prince Charles over video link. British biomedical scientists and National Health Service staff also reported that a shortage of equipment was preventing them from carrying out more coronavirus tests.

Médecins Sans Frontières (Doctors Without Borders) President Christos Christou urged European countries not to hoard medical supplies and equipment and to allow their export to vulnerable countries in Southeast Asia, the Middle East and Africa. He also called on developed countries to increase their production of medical supplies.

=== 4 April ===
Josep Borrell, the High Representative of the European Union, issued a statement stating that sanctions should not get in the way of the delivery of medical equipment and supplies to countries trying to contain COVID-19.

German State Minister of the Interior for Berlin Andreas Geisel accused the United States of committing "modern piracy" by allegedly diverting a shipment of 200,000 masks from an American 3M's Chinese factory in Thailand intended for Germany. In response, US Embassy spokeswoman Jillian Bonnardeaux, issued a statement on 6 April denying that the US had any "knowledge" of the diversion of the mask shipment from Thailand. 3M also said they had no knowledge of the shipment, stating "We know nothing of an order from the Berlin police for 3M masks that come from China." Berlin police later confirmed that the shipment was not seized by U.S. authorities, but was said to have simply been bought at a better price, widely believed to be from a German dealer or China. This revelation outraged the Berlin opposition, whose CDU parliamentary group leader Burkard Dregger accused Geisel of "deliberately misleading Berliners" in order "to cover up its own inability to obtain protective equipment".

The Hungarian Government announces the creation of a US$4 billion fund to rejuvenate the economy, using rerouted government resources and the national employment fund.

Spanish Prime Minister Pedro Sánchez announces the extension of Spain's lockdown until 25 April to curb the spread of the coronavirus.

Ukraine sends a team of 20 medical personnel to assist Italian medical authorities in the central Marche region.

=== 5 April ===
In the Czech Republic, 300 pilots launch a "Pilots to the People" project to use their private planes distribute medical supplies across the country.

In Jerusalem, the annual Palm Sunday parade is cancelled due to health concerns. An online service is instead held at the Co-Cathedral of the Most Holy Name of Jesus. UK Health Secretary Matt Hancock warns that the UK Government may restrict outdoor exercise if people flout lockdown rules. UK Prime Minister Boris Johnson, who tested positive for COVID-19 ten days ago, is admitted to hospital. Queen Elizabeth II gives a special address to the nation, calling for unity and global cooperation in response to the COVID-19 pandemic.

Catherine Calderwood resigns as the Chief Medical Officer for Scotland for breaking her own department's advice on self-isolation by visiting her second home twice.

=== 6 April ===
Chancellor of Austria Sebastian Kurz announces plans to reopen small non-essential businesses and DIY shops on 14 April, followed by all shops and malls on 1 May, in order to loosen the nationwide lockdown.

Danish Prime Minister Mette Frederiksen announces that Denmark will reopen day care centers and schools for children in the first and fifth grade, commencing 15 April, if the number of coronavirus cases remains stable.

Israeli Prime Minister Benjamin Netanyahu implements a national lockdown for the Passover period, beginning 7 April and ending 10 April including banning Israelis from leaving their homes on Wednesday evenings, when families travel for Passover seder meals. In Italy, Poste Italiane makes an agreement for the Carabinieri to deliver mail to Italian pensioners who are at 75 years old and above.

Polish Prime Minister Mateusz Morawiecki announces plans to increase testing from 6,000-7,000 to 8,000-9,000 a month in response to predictions that infections will peak in May and June.

Romanian President Klaus Iohannis extends the national state of emergency by 30 days.

Spain mobilises 60,000 retired medical personnel in order to facilitate the "contagion slowdown."

Sweden's central bank, Sveriges Riksbank, extends its 500 billion Swedish crowns loan scheme (US$49 billion) to individual companies affected by the coronavirus pandemic.

A spokesman for UK Prime Minister Boris Johnson announces that the country now has 10,000 ventilators in its health system. The 2020 Open Championship, was originally scheduled to be held between 16 and 19 July, at Royal St George's Golf Club in Sandwich, England. The British media company, Daily Mail and General Trust, which publishes the Daily Mail, asks staff to take a pay cut with the difference made up in shares, to help the company cope with the loss of advertising revenue and lower circulation caused by the coronavirus pandemic.

World Health Organization (WHO) Director-General Tedros Adhanom advises that public demand for face masks could create a shortage for medical personnel.

=== 7 April ===
The Czech Republic extends the state of emergency until late April. Czech Prime Minister Andrej Babiš' government had initially sought to extend the state of emergency until 11 May but lacked sufficiency parliamentary support.

Finland extends tightened border controls until 13 May in order to contain the spread of COVID-19.

Slovenian Prime Minister Janez Janša announces that the Slovenian government could ease lockdown measures on factories and service providers if current trends towards the decline of the coronavirus continue.

UK Prime Minister Boris Johnson remains in intensive care while Foreign Secretary Dominic Raab serves as acting-Prime Minister. British Chief Scientific Adviser Patrick Vallance states that while the UK has not seen a rise in the number of coronavirus cases, it remains too early to tell whether the outbreak has peaked.

=== 8 April ===
Negotiations between European Union finance ministers over an economic rescue package break down due to disagreements between the Netherlands and Italy over what conditions should be attached to Eurozone credit for governments fighting the pandemic. Mauro Ferrari, the head of the European Research Council, resigns in protest at his dissatisfaction with the European Union's response to the COVID-19 pandemic.

The French Government extends the nation's lockdown until 15 April.

The President of Turkey's Directorate of Communications announces that the Turkish government will be tracking the mobile phones of citizens to enforce the quarantine through an app called the "Pandemic Isolation Tracking Project."

The World Health Organization's Europe director Hans Kluge issues a statement advising governments not to relax measures aimed at containing the coronavirus.

=== 9 April ===
German Chancellor Angela Merkel has called for "patience" during the coronavirus crisis, stating that society will have to "live with the virus" until a vaccine becomes available.

Hungarian Prime Minister Viktor Orbán extends the nation's lockdown indefinitely.

Russian retailers report a surge in the sales of alcoholic beverages over the past few weeks during the lockdown. According to market research firm Nielsen, the sale of vodka, whisky and beer rose 31%, 47% and 25% respectively.

UK Prime Minister Boris Johnson is released from intensive care but remains in hospital.

=== 10 April ===
The International Monetary Fund announces that it will loan Albania US$190.5 million to deal with the impact of the coronavirus.

German Foreign Minister Heiko Maas criticises the US' handling of the coronavirus pandemic as "too slow" during an interview with Der Spiegel.

In Finland, Tomi Lounema, the head of the country's National Emergency Supply Agency, resigns over the purchase of the multi-million Euro purchase of Chinese face masks that proved unsuitable for local hospital usage.

Hungarian Prime Minister Viktor Orbán makes a speech stating that the country's "tough measures" have slowed the spread of the coronavirus but that country's "real test" still lies ahead. Orbán also stated that Hungary needed 8,000 ventilators and intensive care beds.

Irish Taoiseach Leo Varadkar extends the country's stay-at-home restrictions until 5 May.

The Italian Government bars entry to Italian ports by international rescue vessels ferrying migrants for the duration of the coronavirus pandemic. Italian Prime Minister Giuseppe Conte announces that the Italian government will be extending the nation's lockdown until 3 May.

Kazakhstan extends its state of emergency until the end of April. The state of emergency allows the government to lock down all provinces and the capital, and to shut down many businesses.

The Swiss–based Cyclistes Professionnels Associé (CPA) issues a statement warning against pay cut for cyclists during the coronavirus pandemic.

The Russian Prosecutor General announces that it will be blocking access to "fake news" social media posts questioning Moscow's quarantine measures. Mayor of Moscow Sergei Sobyanin announces that the city will introduce a system of travel passes to monitor and regulate citizens' movements the following week.

The Turkish Government imposes a 48-hour curfew on 31 cities including Ankara and Istanbul.

The English football club Arsenal announces that it will be providing 30,000 free meals and sanitary products to vulnerable people and join forces with a local church to deliver 15,000 tons of emergency supplies to Islington. The club also pledged to donate £100,000 ($124,000) to local organisations and another £50,000 to a COVID-19 Crisis Fund.

=== 11 April ===
Armenian Prime Minister Nikol Pashinyan extends the country's state of emergency by 30 days. The country has closed all educational institutes, public transportation, and banned foreigners from entering. Armenia has also announced that it would postpone a referendum on changes to its Constitutional Court till after the emergency.

The Austrian Federal Railways puts a quarter of its staff (10,000 workers) on short-time work in response to the coronavirus pandemic.

In Belarus, many soccer fans boycotted matches in response to the Football Federation of Belarus' decision not to suspend matches on the grounds that the country had only reported a small number of cases. World Health Organization official Patrick O'Connor also calls upon Belarus to introduce new measures to combat the coronavirus.

The Dutch Government calls for proposals to develop smartphone apps or software to battle the coronavirus including conducting contact tracing.

Pope Francis officiates over a memorial service honoring victims of the coronavirus pandemic including medical personnel.

US President Donald Trump orders top administration officials to take measures to aid Italy including making US military personnel in the country available for telemedical services, setting up field hospitals, and transporting supplies.

British Home Secretary Priti Patel has apologised for the shortage of PPE equipment among medical personnel and has warned that paedophiles are seeking to exploit children online during the coronavirus pandemic. The British Government has also announced that it would invest more in domestic violence services including online support services, hotlines and a national communications campaign in response to a surge in domestic violence cases. British vaccinologist Sarah Gilbert has expressed optimism that her team at the University of Oxford could develop a vaccine by September 2020.

=== 12 April ===
The British Government pledges US$284 million to the World Health Organization (WHO) and charities to help slow the spread of the coronavirus in vulnerable countries. The British Government has allocated 130 million to United Nations agencies while 65 million was allocated to the WHO. British Prime Minister Boris Johnson is discharged from hospital.

Portugal's Sporting CP announces that it will cut players' salaries by 40% for three months in response to financial losses caused by COVID-19. The sporting body's board of directors will also take a 50% paycut.

Turkish Interior Minister Süleyman Soylu resigns due to criticism of his decision to impose a weekend curfew in several major Turkish cities in response to COVID-19. Soylu's resignation was rejected by Turkish President Recep Tayyip Erdoğan.

In the Vatican City, Pope Francis holds an Easter Sunday service where he offered prayers for the over 100,000 people who had perished during the coronavirus pandemic.

=== 13 April ===
French President Emmanuel Macron extends the nationwide lockdown until 11 May. Israeli Prime Minister Benjamin Netanyahu announces a nationwide lockdown during the Passover holiday and the Minouma festival. Between from 5 pm on 14 April until 5 am on 16 April, Israelis will be barred from leaving their hometowns or in the case of Jerusalem, the neighbourhoods were they live.

Italian Football Federation President Gabriele Gravina expresses hope that players can be tested in early May for the coronavirus in order to prepare for the season to restart. The Kazakhstan government announces that 3.7 million Kazakhs have applied for financial aid. Of these, 1.8 million applications have been approved.

Pope Francis calls on society to stand behind female victims of domestic violence while praising female doctors, nurses, police officers, prison guards, and sales staff involved in essential work.

Russian President Vladimir Putin states that the coronavirus situation is getting worse in Russia and commits the Russian Defence Ministry's resources to dealing with the crisis.

Spanish authorities allow people living in regions of Spain where Easter Monday is not a holiday to resume work. Certain businesses like construction and manufacturing were allowed to reopen but most shops, bars, and public places remain closed until 26 April.

Turkish President Recep Tayyip Erdogan announces that Turkey will impose a new lockdown over the weekend to combat the spread of COVID-19.

Ukrainian President Volodymyr Zelenskyy offers a US$1 million reward to Ukrainian scientists if they develop a vaccine for the coronavirus.

The British Government's Chief Scientific Adviser Patrick Vallance forecasts that the number of coronavirus-related deaths will continue to rise this week before plateauing over the next two to three weeks. He thinks that the number of daily deaths should begin decreasing after that.

During a media conference on Monday evening, World Health Organization Director-General Tedros Adhanom states that governments need to consider six criteria for lifting coronavirus lockdown restrictions: first, the transmission is controlled; second, systems are in place to detect, test, isolate and treat every case and trace their contacts; third, risks are minimised in care homes and other at-risk environments; fourth, preventive measures are in place in schools, offices and other places people need to go; fifth, importation risks can be managed; and sixth, communities are fully educated and able to deal with the "new norm."

=== 14 April ===
The Austrian Government allows the reopening of thousands of shops as part of a move to loosen lockdown restrictions.

The European Commission limits restrictions on the export of coronavirus protective equipment to facemasks and exempts Western Balkan countries from such restrictions.

Iceland announces that it is planning to lift movements restrictions on 4 May. As part of the relaxation, primary schools will fully open while high schools and universities will open with some limitations.

British-Swedish company AstraZeneca announces that it would start a clinical trial to assess the potential of Calquence in treating coronavirus patients.

=== 15 April ===
The Football Federation of Belarus postpones its Women's Premier League, which was scheduled to start on 16 April, after several players were found to have been in contact with suspected carriers of the coronavirus.

Denmark begins reopening nurseries, kindergartens, and primary schools after a month-long closure which began on 12 March. However, classes are only resuming in about half of Denmark's municipalities and 35 percent of Copenhagen's schools as others have requested more time to adjust to new health safety protocols.

Finnish Prime Minister Sanna Marin lifts roadblocks and travel restrictions around the Uusimaa region which contains the capital Helsinki, easing a lockdown which began on 28 March.

German Chancellor Angela Merkel announces that most shops up to 800sq metres (8,600 sq ft) will be allowed to reopen once they have "plans to maintain hygiene." However, schools will remain closed until 4 May. The German Government has also maintained a ban on large gatherings until 31 August.

Portuguese President Marcelo Rebelo de Sousa states that Portugal has "flattened the curve" but that it is still too early to lift the nationwide lockdown. de Sousa extends Portugal's lockdown until 1 May.

In Russia, veterans urge President Vladimir Putin to postpone a military parade to mark the 75th anniversary of World War Two, scheduled for 9 May, due to the risk posed by the coronavirus.

The Turkish Interior Ministry imposes quarantines on 227 residential areas in 58 provinces, which are home to 250,000 people. The Ministry also announced that it was lifting restrictions on 41 residential areas in 14 provinces.

UK luxury car manufacturer Aston Martin suspends manufacturing at two of its factories by another week in response to lockdown measures in the United Kingdom. First Minister of Northern Ireland Arlene Foster extends Northern Ireland's lockdown by three weeks in coordination with similar measures by the neighbouring Republic of Ireland, which are due to run until 5 May.

=== 16 April ===
The Austrian Social Affairs and Health Minister Rudolf Anschober announces that the Austrian Government intends to test all resthome residents, approximately 130,000 people.

The Dutch Ministry of Social Affairs and Employment reports that the number of people applying for unemployment benefits had risen to 42% in March. The Ministry had also paid benefits to 37,800 newly unemployed, with the majority being former restaurant and bar workers as well as people under the age of 25 years. The Head of the Dutch National Institute for Health (RIVM) Jaap Van Dissel presents a study to the Dutch Parliament suggesting that 3 percent of the Dutch population have developed antibodies to combat the coronavirus.

The European Commission advises member states using mobile apps to contain the spread of the coronavirus to ensure that such apps comply with the European Union's privacy rules and avoid using personalised location data.

The German Federal Constitutional Court rules that Germans have the right to hold protests if they adhere to physical distancing rules.

The Georgian Government bans the movement of all private vehicles until 21 April. Georgia has already imposed a state of emergency closing most businesses, schools, public transportation, and gatherings of more than three people until 10 May.

The Hungarian Government announces that they intend to extend Hungary's lockdown by one week from Saturday (18 April) in order to combat the spread of COVID-19. Municipal authorities will be empowered to impose special restrictions over the weekend to ensure local communities are protected.

The Polish Government announces that parks and forests will reopen to the public on Monday (20 April) and then revise the rules on the number of customers allowed in shops as part of efforts to loosen lockdown restrictions. The Polish Government also clarifies that the country's borders will remain closed until 3 May.

Russian President Vladimir Putin announces that the Russian Government is postponing the country's annual World War II commemoration parade due to health risks associated with the coronavirus.

Switzerland announces that it will ease restrictions in a three-stage process. First, hospitals will be allowed to perform all operations including elective surgeries while hair salons, massage parlours and cosmetic studies will be allowed to reopen on 27 April. Second, all primary schools, shops, and markets will be allowed to reopen from 11 May. Third, the government will reopen secondary schools, vocational schools, and universities from 8 June.

British Health Secretary Matt Hancock states that it is too early for the British Government to lift the coronavirus lockdown in order to prevent the spread of the coronavirus. At the advice of epidemiologist Neil Ferguson, the British Government maintains social distancing measures until a vaccine becomes available. Foreign Secretary Dominic Raab extends the UK's lockdown by another three weeks.

=== 17 April ===
Health ministers from six Balkan states including Kosovar Health Minister Arben Tivia agree to coordinate their responses to combat the spread of the coronavirus in the Western Balkans.

The German Health Minister Jens Spahn states the coronavirus pandemic in Germany has become manageable again due to the higher rate of recoveries over infections.

In the United Kingdom, Lord Mayor of London Sadiq Khan has called on the British Government to make it compulsory for people travelling or shopping around the capital to wear face masks.

=== 18 April ===
The Croatian Government extended its lockdown by another 15 days, until 4 May.

The Danish Government announces that it will invest 100 billion Danish krones (US$14.6 billion) in direct economic aid, state guaranteed loans and extended deadlines for tax payments to help businesses affected by the economic fallout of the coronavirus pandemic.

The Greek Orthodox Church has conducted their Easter services in empty churches on Saturday night to comply with health restrictions to prevent the spread of the coronavirus.

Israeli Prime Minister Benjamin Netanyahu announces that the Israeli Government will be relaxing lockdown restrictions by allowing some businesses to reopen and easing restrictions on movement.

In response to a sharp spike in cases, Russian President Vladimir Putin orders the Russian government to provide a daily forecast of coronavirus cases.

Spanish Prime Minister Pedro Sánchez announces that he would ask the Spanish Parliament to extend the national lockdown until 9 May. Sánchez has indicated that he wanted to relax restrictions on children, who will be allowed out of their homes after 27 April under restrictions.

In the United Kingdom, Queen Elizabeth II announces that there will be no guns salutes to mark her birthday on 21 April, the first such request made in her 68-year reign. Housing Secretary Robert Jenrick announces that the UK Government will do more to provide healthcare workers with personal protective equipment.

Uzbekistan extended social distancing measures through 10 May.

=== 19 April ===
Croatian Interior Minister Davor Božinović lifts internal travel restrictions, allowing people to travel within their districts. However, the country's borders remain closed.

Vice President of the European Commission for Values and Transparency Věra Jourová has criticised the European Union for what she described as its "morbid dependency" on China and India for medical supplies during a Czech television debate.

French Health Minister Olivier Véran eases restrictions on visits to nursing and seniors' homes, which had been in place since March 2020. Only two relatives may visit a senior or social care facility at the same time while physical contact is prohibited.

United Kingdom Minister for the Cabinet Office Michael Gove has rebuffed a BuzzFeed News report claiming that the British Government is considering a three-stage plan to start easing lockdown restrictions within weeks.

=== 20 April ===
The Belgian Government has indicated that it is planning to ease lockdown restrictions since the coronavirus pandemic in Belgium has peaked.

The European Commissioner for Economic and Financial Affairs, Taxation and Customs Paolo Gentiloni stated during an interview that €1.5 trillion worth in aid would be needed to tackle the coronavirus pandemic.

In Israel, demonstrators have protested against Prime Minister Benjamin Netanyahu's coronavirus restrictions while keeping two meters apart.

The Lithuanian Finance Ministry has forecast that the Lithuanian economy will shrink by 7.8% this year if the coronavirus is contained by summer.

Norway has begun reopening pre-school nurseries after a month-long lockdown. Norwegian Air has announced that four of its subsidiaries in Denmark and Sweden had filed for bankruptcy, affecting 4,700 jobs.

The Polish Health Minister Łukasz Szumowski has issued a statement stating that the Polish Government may restore restrictions if there is a spike in cases. Earlier, the Polish Government had announced the reopening of parks and forests on Monday.

Russian President Vladimir Putin has stated that Russia has managed to curb the spread of the coronavirus but that the outbreak had not yet peaked.

Slovak Prime Minister Igor Matovič has proposed a plan to reopen small shops of up to 300 square metres, outdoor sports grounds and takeaways from 23 April.

Turkish President Recep Tayyip Erdogan announced that Turkey will impose a four-day lockdown on 31 cities commencing 24 April (Thursday) to combat the spread of the coronavirus.

In the United Kingdom, NHS Blood and Transplant announced that they were planning to collect blood from coronavirus patients to investigate if convalescent plasma transfusion could speed up patients' rate of recovery. British Culture Secretary has also announced that the UK Government will review its approach to the coronavirus pandemic to identify areas for improvement in response to public criticism. Prince Philip has also issued a statement thanking health workers, scientists and other essential services for their work during the coronavirus pandemic. A spokesperson for British Prime Minister Boris Johnson has also defended the Government's decision not to lift lockdown and social distancing measures, saying that the UK's main concern is to prevent a second wave of infections. British Chancellor of the Exchequer Rishi Sunak announced that over 140,000 companies, employing more than 1 million people, had applied for the Government's wage subsidy scheme.

The International Monetary Fund's Managing Director Kristalina Georgieva has described the spread of the coronavirus as the worst crisis since the Great Depression during a media conference in Bulgaria.

=== 21 April ===
Austrian Chancellor Sebastian Kurz has announced that the Austrian Government will allow restaurants to reopen and religious services to resume from 15 May. Schools are scheduled to reopen for senior students in early May while schools for younger pupils will reopened at a staggered pace from 15 May.

The Danish Health Ministry announces that it will not allow public gatherings with over 500 people until at least 1 September, contradicting earlier reports that the Danish Government would not allow larger public gatherings until 10 May. A current limit on public gatherings of more than ten people remains in force until 10 May.

German Food and Agriculture Minister Julia Klöckner stated during a G20 meeting that food exports should only be curbed during an emergency.

Greek authorities have locked down a migrant hotel in Kranidi housing 470 migrants after a Somali woman tested positive for the coronavirus.

Italian Prime Minister Giuseppe Conte has warned that easing lockdown restrictions may increase the spread of the coronavirus.

The Spanish Government has announced that it will allow children under the age of 12 to leave their homes for 90 minutes with an accompanying adult due to concerns for the mental health of children.

Turkish President Recep Tayyip Erdogan has described the coronavius pandemic as the biggest global crisis since World War Two.

In the United Kingdom, several engineering, aerospace, automotive and Formula One companies have formed the VentilatorChallengeUK consortium in order to produce 1,500 ventilators per week.

United Nations World Food Programme chief economist Arif Husain has warned that the number of people facing acute food insecurity could rise to 265 million as a result of the economic fallout of the coronavirus pandemic.

World Health Organization spokesperson Fadela Chaib issued a statement during a Geneva media briefing that all available evidence suggests that the coronavirus originated in bats and was not created in a laboratory in response to US President Trump's statements that the US would investigate whether the coronavirus was manufactured in a lab.

=== 22 April ===
The German biotech company BioNTech has received approval from Germany's vaccine regulator to test a vaccine candidate, project named BNT162, on 200 human test subjects.

Spanish Prime Minister Pedro Sánchez has announced that Spain will be easing down coronavirus lockdown measures during the second half of May.

Turkmenistan's Foreign Minister Raşit Meredow has insisted that his country has not reported any cases of the coronavirus.

In the United Kingdom, Ed Davey, the acting leader of the Liberal Democrats has called for an inquiry into the British Government's handling of the coronavirus including the partial death toll, limited testing, and the lack of equipment at hospitals. British Foreign Secretary Dominic Raab confirmed the deaths of 69 National Health Service personnel as a result of the coronavirus pandemic and announced that the Government had delivered 1 billion items of personal protective equipment as well as through the devolved administrations of Scotland, Wales, and Northern Ireland. Health Secretary Matt Hancock has confirmed that the British Government will implement large-scale contact tracing once they have curbed the number of new cases.

Pope Francis has called for European unity in combating the coronavirus pandemic ahead of a European Union summit to discuss a contentious economic stimulation package.

=== 23 April ===
The Czech Government announces that it will seek support from the Chamber of Deputies for an extension of the country's state of emergency until 25 May.

Greece has extended lockdown measures by a week until 4 May, a move that will also delay the removal of hundreds of migrants from refugee camps. In addition, two asylum seekers on the island of Lesbos, one Iranian and one Afghan, were shot and wounded after allegedly violating coronavirus quarantine restrictions.

The Irish Health Minister Simon Harris has reported that hospital admissions in Ireland have fallen by 60% to about 40.

The Swedish Government has limited online betting to 5,000 Swedish krona (US$495) a week.

The British Government's Chief Medical Officer Chris Whitty has recommended keeping social distancing measures in place for the rest of the year. The British Health Secretary Matthew Hancock has announced that coronavirus testing will be expanded to other "key workers" outside the medical and nursing home professions including teachers, government servants, and delivery drivers. He also announced that the Government was launching a large scale testing and tracking programme to keep the rate of coronavirus transmissions low.

In the United Kingdom, a team of scientists at Oxford University have tested their first prototype vaccine "ChAdOx1 nCoV-19" on their first batch of volunteers. Meanwhile, Italy's ReiThera, Germany's Leukocare and Belgium's Univercell have confirmed they are working together on developing a trial vaccine within the next few months.

Oran Finnegan, the head of the International Committee of the Red Cross' forensic unit, has advised international governments to prepare and plan for mass casualties resulting from the coronavirus, warning that the rising death toll could overwhelm the local capacity to handle the amount of dead bodies.

The UEFA Champions League has postponed the UEFA Women's Euro 2021 to July 2022.

The World Health Organization Europe Director Dr Hans Kluge has reported that up to half of all coronavirus fatalities in Europe have occurred within nursing homes, showing that the pandemic has disproportionately affected the elderly. Kluge also called for healthcare workers in rest homes to be given more protective gear and support. The WHO also announced that it was launching a "landmark collaboration" to speed up the development, production and the distribution of drugs, tests and vaccines to prevent, diagnose and treat COVID-19.

According to the World Trade Organization (WTO), 80 countries have imposed bans or limited the export of face masks and other protective equipment. However, only 13 WTO members have notified the global trading organization as required by its regulations.

=== 24 April ===
In Belgium, Antwerp authorities announces that they will be testing virus bracelets to ensure that thousands of people employed in the city comply with social distancing rules. The Belgian Government has also announced that they will ease coronavirus restriction measures in May, allowing non-food businesses to reopen on 11 May and schools to reopen from 18 May.

The French Health Ministry has restricted the sale of nicotine substitutes after some new research suggested that nicotine may offer some protection against the coronavirus.

The Hungarian President Viktor Orban has announced that the Hungarian Government intends to replace the current lockdown which imposes a blanket curfew over the population with what he described as a more "fine-tuned plan."

The Israeli government allows most businesses that are not in shopping malls and open markets to reopen as long as they adhere to standards of cleanliness, wearing protective gear, and social distancing. Hairdressers and beauty saloons can resume operations from Saturday midnight while eateries can sell takeaways and provide home deliveries. The Israeli Government also increased fines for violating social distancing guidelines and maintained restrictions on non-essential travel.

The Polish Education Minister Dariusz Piatkowski extends the closure of schools and early childhood education facilities from 26 April to 24 May.

The Portuguese government announces that it intends to conduct 70,000 tests on residents and workers at care homes by the end of May 2020.

Russian authorities announce that they will build a 1,000 bed hospital for coronavirus patients in St Petersburg in response to rising cases and deaths. The Defence Ministry is also building 16 hospitals across the country to cope with demand.

UK Health Secretary Matt Hancock has defended the British Government's guidelines for personal protective equipment (PPE) in response to a lawsuit from two British doctors, who have expressed concerned that existing PPE policies do not protect medical workers from the coronavirus. The opposition British Labour Party has announced a review into the impact of the coronavirus pandemic on the Black, Asian and other minority ethnic communities, who have been disproportionately affected by the pandemic. Transport for London has also announced that it would place 7,000 staff on furlough and access the British Government's job retention scheme.

A spokesperson for the United States Mission in Geneva has confirmed that the United States will not be participating in the launch of a global initiative sponsored by French President Emmanuel Macron and German Chancellor Angela Merkel on Friday to speed up the development, production, and distribution of vaccines and drugs to combat the coronavius pandemic.

The World Health Organization's director-general Tedros Adhanom announced that the international organisation was partnering with world leaders and the private sector to speed up the development, production, and distribution of drugs and vaccines to combat the coronavirus pandemic. The British and Spanish Governments have expressed support for the WHO's efforts.

French pharmaceutical company Sanofi's CEO Paul Hudson has called for better European coordination in efforts to develop a vaccine for the coronavirus, criticizing what he regarded as Europe's slow response to the pandemic.

=== 25 April ===
In Belarus, several people have tested positive for the coronavirus at an orphanage for 170 people.

In France, the office of Prime Minister Edouard Philippe confirmed that he would present a plan to wind down the country's lockdown before the National Assembly on 28 April (Tuesday).

Hundreds in Germany and Poland have gathered at the Polish border town of Zgorzelec against a mandatory coronavirus quarantine for those crossing the border. In Berlin, a thousand anti-lockdown protesters have staged a rally, which was attended by both far left and right-wing activists and groups. Police arrested several protesters for flouting lockdown measures.

The Polish Health Minister Dr Łukasz Szumowski has advised postponing the 2020 Polish presidential election, scheduled for 10 May. Despite pressure from the opposition, medical workers, the public and both allies and members of the ruling Law and Justice party, the Polish government has refused to postpone the election.

Spanish Prime Minister Pedro Sánchez has announced that people will be allowed out to exercise from 2 May if the number of new coronavirus cases continues to drop.

The United Kingdom has started trials to investigate whether plasma collected from donors who have recovered from the coronavirus can be used to treat patients who are severely unwell with it. Starship Technologies has announced that they will be using delivery robots to deliver groceries to National Health Service personnel. A 10 Downing Street spokesperson also confirmed that British Prime Minister Boris Johnson would return to work on Monday.

Air France–KLM's CEO Benjamin Smith announces that the airline group will be implementing voluntary redundancies as part of its initial cost-cutting plans.

The British budget airliner Wizz Air announces that it will resume flights from London's Luton Airport from 1 May, becoming one of the first European airliners to restore services.

David Kaye, the United Nations special rapporteur on the Promotion and Protection of the Right to Freedom of Opinion and Expression, has released a summary of his report to the United Nations Human Rights Council on Twitter expressing concern that some policies meant to combat the coronavirus pandemic "may be failing to meet the standards of legality, necessity and proportionality".

The World Health Organization has issued a statement that there is no evidence that people who have recovered from the coronavirus and have antibodies are protected against a second coronavirus infection.

=== 26 April ===
Italian Prime Minister Giuseppe Conte has announced that Italy will reopen its manufacturing industry from 4 May and schools from September. Companies will be required to introduce strict safety measures before resuming operations. Conte has also confirmed that professional sports teams can resume training on 18 May and individual sports teams on 4 May. As part of the plan, eateries will be allowed to provide takeaway and delivery services, people will be able to move within their home regions, and factories and construction sites will be allowed to resume work provided they adhere to social distancing. Museums and galleries will also reopen on 18 May.

Dutch health authorities have quarantined two mink farms after several animals were found to be infected with the coronavirus.

In Germany, car manufacturers Volkswagen and BMW have announced that they will reopen their factories on Monday in response to the relaxation of lockdown measures.

The Spanish Government has allowed children to leave the house in order to exercise, play or go for a walk as part of the relaxation of lockdown measures, which had previously only allowed adults to leave the house to buy groceries and medicine, walk the dog, and seek medical treatment. Children under the age of 14 are allowed one hour of supervised outdoor activity per day between 9am and 9pm local time but must remain within one kilometre of their home. However, children must be accompanied by adults and must adhere to social distancing policies, not using playgrounds, and not sharing toys. Schools also remain closed.

President of Tajikistan Emomali Rahmon has ordered the closure of all schools, most businesses, and public gatherings including sports gatherings.

=== 27 April ===
The 2020 Formula One World Championship, scheduled to be held at Circuit Paul Ricard, Le Castellet on 28 June, has been cancelled by organisers in response to the coronavirus.

The Norwegian Government has reopened primary schools to children aged six to ten years after six weeks of distance learning. To comply with health measures, classes will be limited to 15 kids.

British Minister of State for Health Edward Argar has confirmed during a radio interview that the British Government will be continuing to test whether antibody tests can be used to combat the coronavirus pandemic. British Prime Minister Boris Johnson announces that he will meet with Labour Party leader Keir Starmer this week and the leaders of other parties the following week as part of efforts to build consensus over plans to ease the coronavirus lockdown. A British court has also delayed the extradition hearing for journalist and activist Julian Assange since lockdown restrictions prevented his lawyers from attending court proceedings.

The British Government has allowed members of the public to submit questions to government ministers, scientific, and medical officers during the daily briefing under Prime Minister Johnson's policy of "maximum possible transparency." The British Chancellor of the Exchequer Rishi Sunak has announced that the UK Government will provide state-backed loans to small businesses in order to protect the economy and workers during the lockdown.

Turkish President Recep Tayyip Erdoğan announced that Turkey would send medical gear including protective suits and masks to the United States. He also imposed a three-day lockdown in 31 cities commencing 1 May and stated that weekend lockdowns would continue until Eid al-Fitr in late May 2020.

The United Nations High Commissioner for Human Rights Michelle Bachelet has called Governments not to violate human rights under the pretext of "exceptional and emergency measures" during the coronavirus pandemic.

=== 28 April ===
The Czech Republic's Chamber of Deputies has extended the country's state of emergency until 17 May, eight days short of the original 25 May extension requested by Prime Minister Andrej Babis.

French Prime Minister Edouard Philippe has stated that the French Government will only lift the lockdown when the number of new cases drops below 3,000 per day. He also announced that face masks will be made available to the public on 11 May. The French Government also plans to carry out at least 700,000 deaths by 11 May.

Greek Prime Minister Kyriakos Mitsotakis has announced a gradual relaxation of Greece's lockdown rules from 4 May onwards.

Portuguese President Marcelo Rebelo de Sousa has announced that the Portuguese Government will lift the nationwide lockdown on 3 May.

Russian President Vladimir Putin has extended the country's non-working period until 11 May in order to contain the spread of the coronavirus.

Spanish President Pedro Sánchez has announced a four-phase plan to lift Spain's lockdown, commencing 4 May. The lifting of restrictions in the country's regions will be determined by the rate of infection, the number of intensive care beds, and social distancing compliance. Spain's National Statistics Institution has reported that Spain's unemployment rate has risen to 14.4% as a result of the coronavirus pandemic.

United Kingdom Health Secretary Matt Hancock has confirmed that several children with no underlying health conditions have died from a rare inflammatory syndrome which researchers believe to be linked to COVID-19. British and Italian medical experts have been investigating a possible link between the coronavirus pandemic and several clusters of several inflammatory disease among infants with symptoms including high fevers and swollen arteries. The Office for National Statistics has also indicated that the death toll resulting from COVID-19 in England and Wales was 52% higher than the daily figures for hospital deaths released by the British Government as of 17 April. The British Government has also dropped its support for four ventilator designs in favour of backing 11 other designs.

Oil and gas multinational company BP has reported a US$4.4 billion quarterly net loss as a result of the coronavirus pandemic.

The International Airlines Group, which owns British Airways, has indicated that it is planning to cut 12,000 jobs as part of a restructuring plan for the airline as a result of economic losses caused by the coronavirus pandemic.

=== 29 April ===
Azerbaijan's Government has closed its borders until 31 May in order to contain the spread of the coronavirus.

Finnish Prime Minister Sanna Marin has announced that early childhood children and younger students would start returning to schools from 14 May for about two weeks prior to the summer break. Upper secondary and vocational school students will continue to study remotely until the end of the school year.

The German Foreign Minister Heiko Maas has extended a warning on overseas tourism until 14 June. German pharmaceutical company BioNTech has announced that it has begun testing its first trial vaccine BNT162 on 12 volunteers. The company intends to test 200 adult volunteers for its second trial. The Economic Affairs and Energy Minister Peter Altmaier has stated that the German economy could shrink by 6.8% as a result of the coronavirus pandemic.

The Grand Prix motorcycle racing events in Germany, the Netherlands, and Finland scheduled for June and July have been cancelled as a result of the coronavirus pandemic.

Ireland's Chief Medical Officer Tony Holohan has announced that it would be too early to ease stay-at-home restrictions until 5 May.

Polish Prime Minister Mateusz Morawiecki has announced that Poland will reopen hotels and shopping malls on 4 May and will reconsider reopening pre-schools on 6 May. Earlier, Polish Government spokesperson Piotr Müller has announced that hotels will be allowed to reopen for the summer holidays in July and August. The government has also extended school closures until 24 May.

Russian Prime Minister Mikhail Mishustin has extended a decree banning foreigners from entering Russia, which was due to end on 30 April, until Russia has managed to bring the coronavirus pandemic under control.

In Serbia, critics of the government's lockdown policies have staged protests in their homes using tin pans, drums, whistles, and horns. The Serbian Government's lockdown measures have included a daily curfew from 16:00 GMT and weekend lockdowns.

The Swiss Government has announced that it will ask the Federal Assembly to approve a 1.9 billion Swiss franc (US$1.95 billion) aid package for the country's aviation sector. This includes 1.275 billion in loan guarantees for airliners and another 600 million francs for companies that support the aviation sector including Swissport International, Gategroup and SR Technics.

Turkish Education Minister Ziya Selçuk has extended the closure of schools until late May. Turkey has closed schools since 12 March. That same day, Health Minister Fahrettin Koca announced that the number of recovered patients doubled the number of new cases. He also stated that the death rate among incubated patients had dropped from 74% to 14% and from 58% to 10% among intensive care patients.

The World Health Organization's Director-General Tedros Adhanom has defended the international organization's response to the coronavirus pandemic, asserting that the WHO had acted "quickly and decisively to warn the world" from the beginning.

=== 30 April ===
The Eurozone's economy shrank by 3.8% in the first quarter of 2020 as a result of the coronavirus pandemic. Spain's economy also shrank by 1.4% during the first quarter of 2020.

Bosnian Chairman of the Council of Ministers Zoran Tegeltija has extended a ban on passenger air travel, which began on 30 March, to June 2020. This ban on air travel excludes cargo planes carrying medical aid to Bosnia-Herzegovina.

The Czech Health Minister Adam Vojtěch has announced that the Czech government will reopen the country's economy since the spread of the coronavirus had been contained, citing a decline in new and active cases.

In Denmark, the Statens Serum Institut (State Serum Institute) announced that the spread of the coronavirus has not accelerated in Denmark since the loosening of restrictions.

Germany's Bundesagentur für Arbeit (Federal Employment Agency) has reported that the country's unemployment rate rose by 13.2 percent in April to more than 2.6 million. The German Government has confirmed that it plans to allow churches, mosques, and synagogues to reopen in accordance with limits on the numbers of participants and social distance measures. German Chancellor Angela Merkel has stated that allowing travel within Europe is currently "not on the agenda." The German pilots' union Vereinigung Cockpit has announced that its Lufthansa members are willing to take a 45% paycut in order to help the airline.

In Hungary, Gergely Gulyás, Prime Minister Viktor Orbán's chief of staff, has announced that schools will remain closed until the end of May and that public gatherings with more than 500 people will be banned until 15 August.

In Ireland, Taoiseach Leo Varadkar has announced that Irish Government will gradually ease lockdown restrictions every two to four weeks. Five criteria for easing restrictions include the progress of the coronavirus, healthcare capacity and resilience, testing and contact tracing capacity, shielding at-risk groups, and the risk of secondary morbidity and mortality due to the restrictions themselves.

Italian Prime Minister Giuseppe Conte has announced that Italy will relax its coronavirus lockdown while taking into account different contagion levels in different parts of the country. Conte also announced a new stimulus package consisting of US$16.3 billion for companies and US$25 billion for both payroll workers and the self-employed.

The Polish Government has lifted the quarantine rule for workers and students entering Poland from neighbouring states including Germany, Lithuania, Slovakia, and the Czech Republic. Other nationals will be required to go through a two-week quarantine.

Russian Prime Minister Mikhail Mishustin has tested positive for the coronavirus.

Swedish climate activist Greta Thunberg has launched a fundraising campaign to help the United Nations buy soap, masks, and gloves to protect children from the coronavirus pandemic. The Swedish town of Lund has spread chicken manure in its central park to deter crowds who would usually congregate on 30 April to celebrate Walpurgis Night as part of measures to encourage social distancing.

The United Kingdom's Department of Health and Social Care has announced that it plans to test a randomly-chosen group of 100,000 people to study the spread of the coronavirus. British Justice Secretary Robert Buckland has reported that the UK had carried out 52,429 tests by Wednesday, short of the UK government's target of conducting 100,000 tests by the end of April. In addition, Buckland announced that the UK has released the first 40 of 4,000 prospective prisoners identified for early release in order to curb the spread of the coronavirus pandemic. A spokesperson for Prime Minister Boris Johnson has indicated that the UK Government is intending to review lockdown measures on 7 May.

British military veteran Tom Moore has raised more than US$37 million for health workers by walking 100 laps around his garden during his 100th birthday.

The British Airline Pilots' Association (BALPA) has reported that British Airways is planning to cut 1,130 of its captain and pilot jobs, roughly a quarter of its 4,346 pilot workforce.

British pharmaceutical company AstraZeneca's CEO Pascal Soriot stated during a media interview that they will know the effectiveness of the vaccine that they are working on with the University of Oxford by June or July 2020.

The World Health Organization's Regional Office for Europe Head Hans Kluge has announced that 21 of the 44 European states that have imposed partial or complete restrictions in response to the coronavirus have eased them. In a statement, he warned that the coronavirus could be "unforgiving" and urged vigilance, perseverance, and patience.

== Reactions and measures in South and Southeast Asia ==
=== 1 April ===
Malaysia extended its Movement Control Order, which was due to have ended on 31 March, by two weeks. Public transportation would only operate for limited hours while private vehicles including e-hailing services would be banned from the roads between 10 p.m and 6 a.m.

=== 2 April ===
Indian government announced plans to convert trains and stadiums into isolation wards for a total of 320,000 patients.

Thailand announced that it would begin a nationwide curfew between 10 p.m. and 4 a.m. starting from 3 April to contain the spread of the coronavirus.

=== 3 April ===
Sri Lanka ordered the cremation of deceased Muslims as a health precaution, drawing controversy among the Muslim community.

Singapore's Prime Minister Lee Hsien Loong announces a "circuit breaker" from 7 April to 4 May to stop the transmission of COVID-19.

=== 4 April ===
Nepal's Department of National Parks and Wildlife Conservation (DNPWC) reports a surge in poaching due to slack monitoring and a drop in public movement.

=== 5 April ===
Malaysian Deputy Foreign Minister Kamaruddin Jaffar announces that the Malaysian Government has repatriated 4,811 stranded nationals and that 2,298 Malaysians remain stranded overseas. Immigration authorities in the state of Johor announce that Malaysians with Singaporean work permits will be allowed to re-enter the country if they pass swab tests proving they are free of the coronavirus.

President of Sri Lanka Gotabaya Rajapaksa announces that he has released 2,961 prisoners in order to reduce congestion in prisons. These include prisoners that have served the majority of their terms, had been remanded for minor offenses, and had been unable to pay their bail.

=== 6 April ===
Amnesty International warns that older Rohingya refugees in Bangladesh are at risk from the coronavirus due to their overcrowded camps, poor living conditions, and a lack of basic health information. According to the United Nations, about 31,500 of the 860,000 refugees are 60 years old and over.

Indian Prime Minister Narendra Modi and other government officials take a 30 percent salary cut as part of government measures to tackle the economic fallout of the coronavirus pandemic.

Singapore quarantines nearly 20,000 migrant workers, mainly Bangladeshis and South Asians, in two dormitories in response to a surge in infection clusters linked to foreign workers.

Thailand extends a ban on incoming passenger flights until 18 April.

=== 7 April ===
The Singapore Government tables a bill to set up provisions for a safe election to be held during the COVID-19 pandemic.

Philippine president Rodrigo Duterte announces to extend the lockdown and home quarantine measures on Luzon until 30 April.

Japan declares state of emergency.

=== 8 April ===
Bangladeshi Government imposes a lockdown in Cox's Bazar District, which is home to 2 million Rohingya refugees, prohibiting anyone from entering or leaving the region.

Supreme Court of India orders that private medical laboratories not charge patients for testing COVID-19.

Malaysian contraceptive giant Karex CEO Goh Miah Kiat, which manufactures 20% of the world's condoms, warns that the country's lockdown measures could lead to global shortage of condoms.

=== 9 April ===
Indian health authorities lockdown several residential districts in the capital New Delhi and the neighbouring Uttar Pradesh state that have been identified as coronavirus hotspots. Residents in those hotspots will not be allowed to leave their homes but will be supplied with food, medicines, and other supplies.

=== 10 April ===
Malaysian company Top Glove, the world's biggest manufacturer of medical gloves, announces plans to manufacture face masks to meet public demand in response to the coronavirus pandemic. The Malaysian Government also extends the movement control order until 28 April.

Singapore's Ministry of Education suspends the use of Zoom for online education after hackers hijacked a geography lesson and showed an obscene image. The Ministry is working with Zoom Video Communications to tighten security settings and measures.

=== 11 April ===
The Bangladeshi Government extends the nationwide lockdown until 25 April.

Indian Prime Minister Narendra Modi extends the nationwide lockdown without specifying how long it will be.

=== 12 April ===
Indonesia orders curbs on public transportation ahead of the annual exodus to home villages following Ramadan in a bid to combat the spread of the coronavirus. As part of these measures, public buses, trains, airplanes and ships will be allowed to fill only half their passenger seats. Cars will only be allowed to fill half of their seats while motorbikes can only be ridden by one person. Myanmar's Ministry of Health and Sports extends a ban on international flights to combat the spread of the coronavirus. The Sri Lankan government orders that all coronavirus victims be cremated, triggering protests from the Sri Lankan Muslim community.

=== 13 April ===
The Bangladeshi Government extends the national holiday until 25 April in an attempt to combat the spread of COVID-19.

Al Jazeera reports that about 40,000 Indian crew members are stranded on cruise and cargo ships around the world due to travel restrictions caused by COVID-19. The Indian Ministry of External Affairs spokesperson Dammu Ravi has said that the return of Indians stranded abroad is still a "work in progress."

The Indonesian Ulema Council advises Muslim adherents to comply with government directives and to limit religious activities to the home.

After a ban on Zoom for Home-Based Learning, Singapore's Ministry of Education allowed schools to resume its use with new safety measures implemented.

=== 14 April ===
Leaders of Association of Southeast Asian Nations (ASEAN) meet online to discuss their countries' response to the coronavirus including discussions on a regional stockpile of medical equipment for emergencies and the creation of a regional fund to fight the pandemic.

Indian Prime Minister Narendra Modi announces that the country's lockdown will be extended until 3 May. Chief Minister of Kerala Pinarayi Vijayan calls on the Indian Government to repatriate the more than 3 million migrant workers in the United Arab Emirates, citing the inadequate isolation and quarantine facilities.

=== 15 April ===
The Indian Government announces that it will ease lockdown restrictions in the rural areas on several activities, including manufacturing and infrastructure building, starting from next Monday (20 April) to provide relief for workers affected by the COVID-19 lockdown.

The Maldives government imposes a 24-hour curfew in the capital Malé and several nearby islands after the country reported its first case of domestic transmission. Police are urging people to return to their homes by 15:30 local time.

The Singaporean Government makes it compulsory for all people to wear a face mask following a surge in cases over the past two days. The Health Ministry has stated that anyone found without a mask will be fined S$300 (US$212) while repeat offenders would be prosecuted in court and face higher fines. Exemptions would be made for children below two years old or those with special needs.

The Pakistani Government announces that it will be easing restrictions on certain economic sectors including the construction and cement industries in order to combat rising unemployment and economic stagnation. Several Sunni leaders have also defied government regulations to limit worship activities and services.

The Thai Government has extended a ban on incoming flights until the end of April. However, the Interior Ministry has announced that land borders in 21 provinces would be reopened on Saturday to allow the return of Thais stranded abroad. Up to 100 people will be allowed to enter each border cross each day and all will be subject to a 14-day quarantine. In addition, 11 Thai and international NGOs including the Manushya Foundation petition the Thai Government to release prisoners in order to protect them from the spread of the coronavirus in crowded prisons.

=== 16 April ===
The Indian Government reverses its ban on the export of the anti-malaria drug hydroxychloroquine, sending a shipment to the United States at the request of President Trump.

The Singaporean Health Minister Gan Kim Yong quarantines a ninth foreign workers' dormitory after the detection of a new cluster at Mandai Lodge 1.

=== 17 April ===
The President of Myanmar Win Myint announces that 24,896 people will be released from the country's prisons in a bid to ease overcrowding and prevent the spread of the coronavirus among prisoners.

Pakistan receives a US$1.5 billion loan from the International Monetary Fund to deal with the economic fallout caused by the coronavirus pandemic.

=== 18 April ===
In Bangladesh, over 100,000 people have defied a ban on public gatherings by attending the funeral of an Islamic cleric and Khelafat Majlish political leader named Maulana Zubayer Ahmed Ansari in the country's Brahmanbaria District, about 100 kilometres away from the capital Dhaka.

In Myanmar, a Christian pastor named David Lah and a Christian rock singer named Myo Gyi have tested positive for the coronavirus. 22 cases have been traced to an illegal religious gathering which he had hosted. Pastor Lah and three other people were charged with violating the country's Natural Disaster Management Law.

The Supreme Court of Nepal orders the Nepalese Government to bring back migrant workers stranded abroad after it had initially barred them from returning in an attempt to prevent the spread of the coronavirus. The Supreme Court had ruled in favour of a petition by the labour NGO People Forum for Human Rights (PFHR). Nepal has 2.6 million workers in the Gulf States, Malaysia and South Korea.

=== 19 April ===
India agrees to supply hydroxychloroquine tablets to the United Arab Emirates in order to treat coronavirus patients. The Indian state of Maharashtra allows a limited number of economic sectors to resume work on Monday to address unemployment.

South Korea only reports single digit new cases.`

=== 20 April ===
The Bangladeshi Government has imposed a 14-day 24-hour curfew on the residents of seven villages in the Brahmanbaria district in response to an illegal mass funeral for Bangladeshi Muslim leader Maulana Jubayer Ahmed Ansari that was attended by over 100,000. Bangladeshi authorities are also conducting tests to identify any cases of the coronavirus among attendees.

The Malaysian Government has announced that the Malaysian Parliament will resume for a single day on 18 May but there will be no parliamentary debates.

=== 21 April ===
In Bangladesh, International Committee of the Red Cross has organised a hygiene training session for prison staff at a Bangladeshi prison where it also distributed disinfection materials.

Indonesian President Joko Widodo has banned the traditional annual Ramadan exodus in order to curb the spread of the coronavirus.

The Thai Government has extended foreigners' visas by three months in order to avoid long queues at immigration centres. Foreigners whose visas expired on 26 March will be permitted to stay until 31 July without having to apply for another visa.

=== 22 April ===
The Indian Government-owned Broadcast Engineering Consultants India announces plans to manufacture thousands of wristbands that will monitor the health and movements of coronavirus patients, perform contact tracing, and aid health workers delivering essential services. The company will present its designs to Indian hospitals and state governments and will work with Indian start-ups to manufacture them.

Governor of Jakarta Anies Baswedan has extended social restrictions for an extra month until 22 May and ordered that residents prayed at home during Ramdan.

=== 23 April ===
The Indonesian Transportation Ministry's director-general of aviation Novie Riyanto Rahardjo announced that the Indonesian Government would ban all domestic passenger air and sea travel from Friday (24 April) until 1 June in order to curb the spread of the coronavirus. Cargo transportation is exempt from the ban.

=== 24 April ===
Indian Prime Minister Narendra Modi has urged India to be "self-reliant" in the fight against the coronavirus pandemic during a video conference with village council heads.

=== 25 April ===
Sri Lanka has imposed another 24 hour curfew following a surge in cases, with most of them being Sri Lanka Navy sailors searching for people evading the quarantine.

=== 26 April ===
In Bangladesh, hundreds of textile workers have staged a protest in Dhaka, demanding wages and financial support in response to the lockdown which has crippled the country's textile industry.

Indian Prime Minister Narendra Modi has urged citizens to comply with the nationwide lockdown and social distancing measures in a radio address in response to the rising number of cases and deaths.

The Sri Lankan Government has extended the nationwide lockdown until 4 May in response to an outbreak at Welisara naval base.

=== 27 April ===
Indian Prime Minister Narendra Modi claimed that his country's month-long lockdown has saved lives and yielded positive results during a video conference with other heads of state. The Indian Council of Medical Research has advised state governments to stop using coronavirus testing equipment from two Chinese companies Guangzhou Wondfo Biotech and Zhuhai Livzon Diagnostics due to their unsatisfactory performance. In response, Chinese Embassy spokesperson Ji Rong criticized the Indian Council of Medical Research's decision as "unfair, irresponsible and prejudiced."

=== 29 April ===
In India, Mumbai health authorities have delayed a plan to give the anti-malarial drug hydroxychloroquine to thousands of residents in the city's slums in accordance with government guidelines.

=== 30 April ===
The Sri Lankan Government has reimposed a 24-hour curfew following a new surge of outbreaks among Sri Lanka Navy personnel and their families.

== Reactions and measures in Western Pacific ==
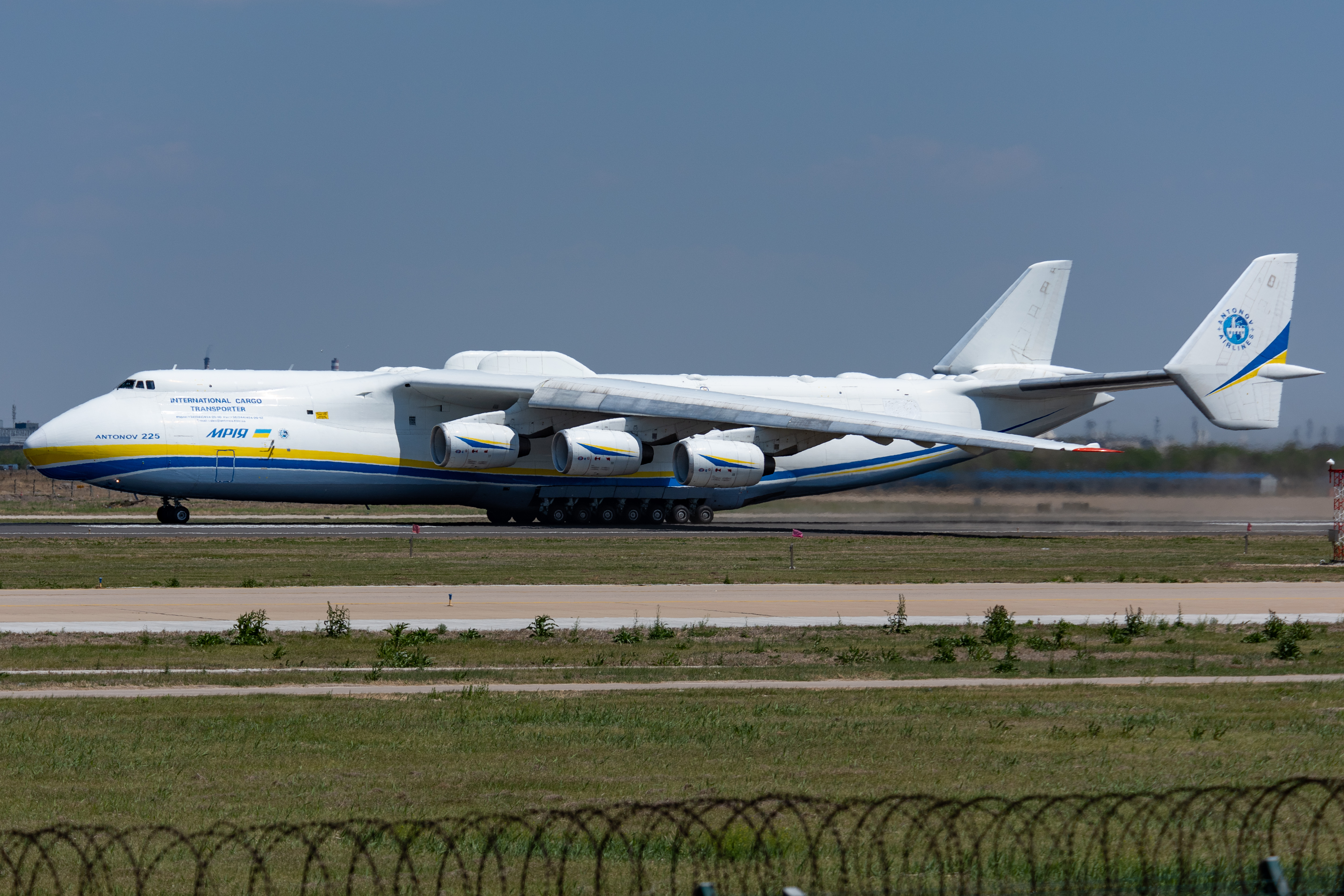
The Antonov An-225 began flying to Tianjin Binhai International Airport in April 2020 to transport medical supplies to Europe

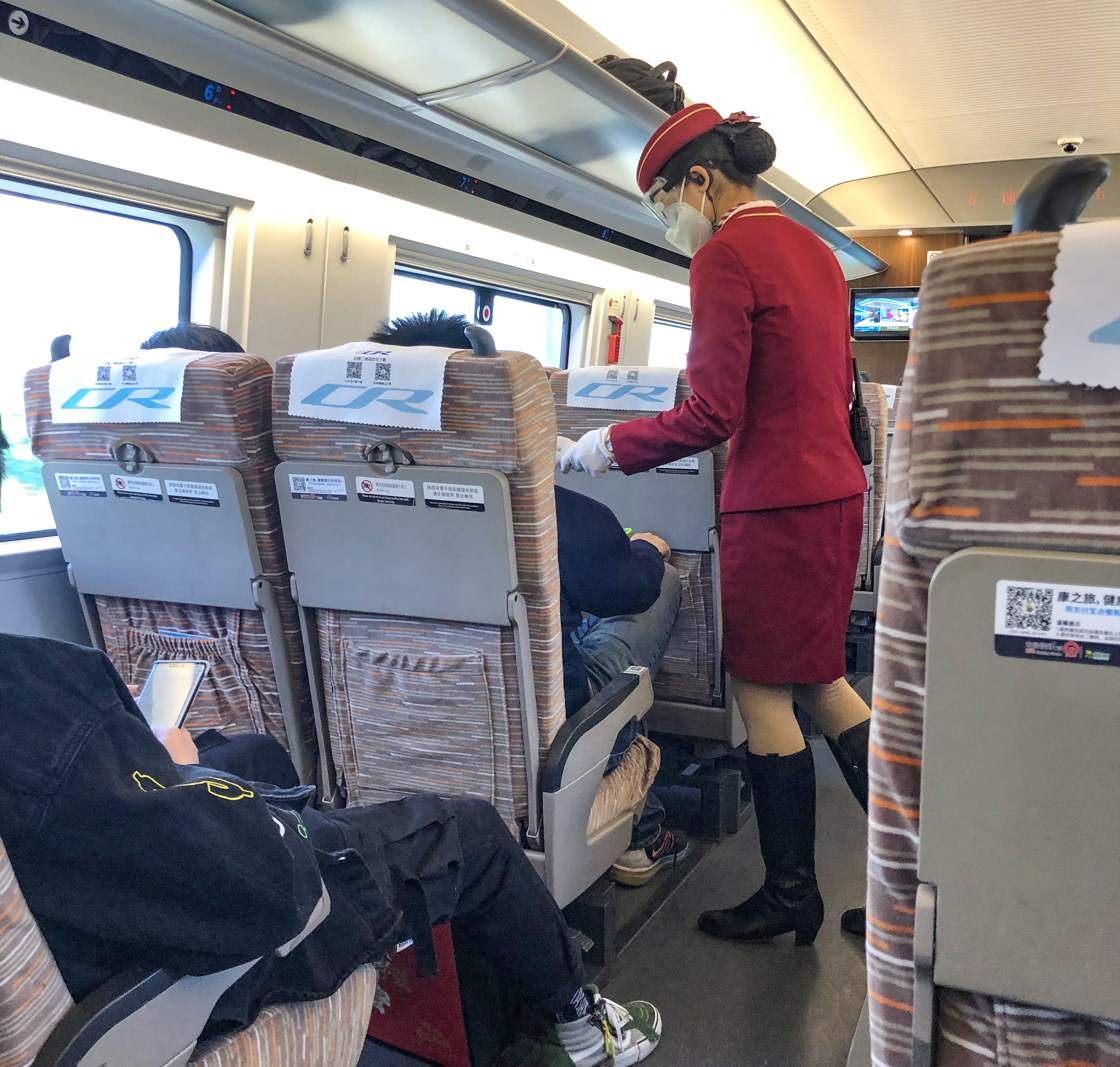
Railway staff checking passengers' temperature on a Beijing–Tianjin intercity railway train after the mutual recognition of the health status of the Beijing-Tianjin-Hebei region

=== 1 April ===
Japan Post suspended services to more than 150 countries. Japan's Nikkei Index dropped more than 4 percent in response to growing economic uncertainty.

Taiwan required all people using public transportation to wear face masks while barring people with fevers from entering stations or airports. The Taiwanese President Tsai Ing-wen and Foreign Minister Joseph Wu announced that Taiwan would be donating masks and medical supplies to the US, hard-hit European countries, and Taiwan's diplomatic allies. The Taiwanese Government intended to invest US$35 million in economic relief.

=== 2 April ===
The Australian Commonwealth Science and Industrial Research Organisation (CSIRO) began the first stage of potential vaccines for COVID-19 on ferrets at a biosecurity facility near Melbourne.

The Chinese city of Shenzhen banned the breeding, trade and consumption of wildlife including snakes, lizards, as well as cats and dogs. The Chinese Government also sent a mercy flight to evacuate Chinese students in London. Chinese Government announced it had distributed 11 million masks and 500,000 disinfecting products to Chinese students abroad in affected countries.

In Guam, the United States Navy announced that it would evacuate 3,000 personnel aboard the aircraft carrier USS Theodore Roosevelt, which had reported cases of the coronavirus.

New Zealand Deputy Prime Minister Winston Peters announced that foreign travellers in New Zealand would be classified as engaging in "essential travel" and thus able to travel domestically when they have a confirmed international flight out of the country, subject to New Zealand Government requirements. In addition, foreign governments would be allowed to evacuate their citizens in charter flights provided they satisfied New Zealand health requirements. To improve travel between New Zealand and Europe, the Government also approved a second daily flight between Doha to Auckland by Qatar Airways.

President of the Philippines Rodrigo Duterte warned lockdown violators that he would not hesitate to order the Philippines police and military to "shoot them dead" if they defied lockdown requirements and harm doctors and health workers.

South Korea reported that it had quarantined 158 short-term visitors at quarantine facilities. In addition, 224 South Koreans and 11 foreigners were tested for the virus. Eight foreigners were denied entry for refusing to accept the quarantine. South Korea will also start enforcing penalties on violators from 5 April, with fines, jail and deportation among them.

=== 3 April ===
The Chinese Foreign Ministry advised foreign diplomats to stop visiting Beijing in order to prevent the spread of COVID-19. Authorities in Wuhan also allow food vendors to resume operations.

The US embassy in Tokyo urged US nationals living in Japan to either return to the US immediately or stay in the Asian country for an indefinite period, adding that the Japanese government's decision not to test broadly made it difficult to accurately assess the COVID-19 prevalence rate.

=== 4 April ===
In Australia, Acting Immigration Minister Alan Tudge urges temporary visa holders, including students, skilled workers, and visitors, to return home in response to a looming economic downturn and unemployment. While Tudge stressed that temporary visa holders in essential industries were welcome, he urged those who were unable to support themselves to return home.

China declared Saturday a day of mourning. The country also held three minutes of silence at 10 am local time to commemorate the more than 3,000 health workers and patients who died during the country's COVID-19 pandemic. China's Guangxi region, which borders Vietnam, suspends cross-border and movement with Vietnam in order to contain the coronavirus.

Hong Kong's Labour Department announces that it will conduct mobile broadcasts instructing foreign domestic workers not to gather in public, beginning Sunday. Broadcasts will be in Chinese, English, Filipino, Indonesian, and Thai.

South Korea extends social distancing measures for two weeks until 19 April in response to a spate of cases in the Seoul area.

=== 6 April ===
In Australia, New South Wales authorities allow the cruise ship Ruby Princess to dock in the state. The New South Wales Police also launch a criminal investigation into whether the ship's operator Carnival Australia breached the Biosecurity Act 2015 (Cwth) and state laws by allowing infected passengers to disembark on 19 March.

Japanese Prime Minister Shinzo Abe announces that a state of emergency will come into effect in Tokyo and six other prefectures on Tuesday in order to contain the coronavirus. This state of emergency will empower Japanese governments to order people to stay at home and businesses to close.

New Zealand Foreign Minister Winston Peters announces that the New Zealand Government will be sending a mercy flight to rescue citizens stranded in Peru. NZ authorities have also gained permission from Chilean authorities to transit through Santiago.

=== 7 April ===
The Japanese Government approves a 108.2 trillion Yen (US$993 billion) emergency economic stimulus package worth aimed at combating the economic fallout of the coronavirus pandemic, referring to it as the "biggest crisis" the country's economy has faced since World War II.

New Zealand Minister of Civil Defence Peeni Henare extends the country's state of emergency by a further seven days in response to a rise in cases. This state of emergency is separate from the four week alert level four lockdown. That same day, Prime Minister Jacinda Ardern demoted Health Minister David Clark and stripped him of his associate finance portfolio for breaching lockdown conditions by driving his family on a social outing to a beach.

Philippines President Rodrigo Duterte extends the lockdown of the country's main island Luzon and its capital Manila until the end of April. Human Rights Watch also calls on the Philippines Government to reduce the number of inmates in response to concerns about a "serious outbreak" in the country's overcrowded prisons. In November 2019, 215,000 prisoners were detained in a system with a maximum capacity of 40,000.

=== 8 April ===
The Australian Government approves an Aus$30 billion wage subsidy package to help 6 million Australians, marking the country's largest financial stimulus package.

Chinese authorities lifted the lockdown on Wuhan, which has been put in place since 23 January. Anyone who has a "green" code on a widely used smartphone health app is allowed to leave the city. In addition, train, road and rail connections have now been re-established. In addition, Chinese authorities have launched an investigation of prominent Communist Party member Ren Zhiqiang, who had criticised Chinese Communist Party general secretary Xi Jinping's handling of the coronavirus pandemic.

Hong Kong extends social distancing restrictions including bans on public gatherings and businesses until 23 April.

New Zealand Prime Minister Jacinda Ardern expresses "cautious optimism" that New Zealand may be slowing the spread of COVID-19 after the country reported the lowest number of new daily cases in a fortnight.

=== 9 April ===
Australian authorities question the Captain of the Ruby Princess and confiscate the ship's black box as part of their homicide investigation into the cruise ship, a major cluster for the coronavirus pandemic in Australia.

Chinese authorities in the northeastern province of Heilongjiang build a new hospital to cope with a cluster of imported cases from Russia. In addition, research published by scientists from the University of Wuhan in the European Respiratory Journal suggests that it is possible for expectant mothers to pass the coronavirus to unborn babies in their womb based on four infected newborns.

New Zealand Prime Minister Jacinda Ardern announces that New Zealanders returning home will be subject to compulsory quarantine, commencing by the end of the day.

In the Philippines, the International Committee of the Red Cross has worked with the Philippines authorities to establish four isolation centres for prisoners confirmed with mild to moderate symptoms of the coronavirus or suspected of having the disease.

The Taiwanese Ministry of Foreign Affairs denies accusations by WHO Director-General Tedros Adhanom that it had made racial slurs against him and demanded his apology. Taiwan is not a member of the WHO due to the One China Policy. In response, Beijing accused Taiwan of conspiring with Internet users to attack Tedros Adhanom.

The Vietnamese Government implements a 180 trillion dong (US$7.6 billion) tax holiday to help businesses affected by the coronavirus pandemic.

=== 10 April ===
The Chinese Government tightens restrictions on the export of face masks and other personal protective equipment, calling for the shipment of such items to be subject mandatory customs inspection.

South Korea introduces early voting for coronavirus patients during the 2020 South Korean legislative election, which is scheduled for 15 April. The South Korean Government had set up eight special polling stations for 3,000 coronavirus patients and 900 medical personnel treating them at special treatment centres.

The Vietnamese Ministry of Finance enters into talks with international lenders including the IMF, World Bank, and the Asian Development Bank for a US$1 billion loan to deal with its economic deficit caused by the pandemic.

=== 11 April ===
In China, Al Jazeera reports that African residents in Guangzhou's Yuexiu District have faced heightened hostility and discrimination including forced evictions, arbitrary quarantines, and mass coronavirus testing in response to growing unease over eight recent cases originating in that district, which is home to a sizeable African community. Ethnic tensions had been inflamed after five Nigerians flouted quarantine orders by frequenting local businesses, causing nearly 2,000 people they had come into contact with to undergo testing or quarantine.

Japanese Prime Minister Shinzo Abe calls for citizens to avoid bars and restaurants as part of the state of emergency in Tokyo and six other prefectures.

The South Korean Government announces that it will strap wristbands onto people who defy self-quarantine orders as it monitors the spread of the coronavirus.

Vietnamese airliners Bamboo Airways and VietJet Air announce that they will resume flights on 16 April after the expiry of a government order for 15 days of physical distancing.

=== 12 April ===
In China, several African governments have voiced concern about Africans in Guangzhou being subject to hostility, discrimination, and violence in response to local authorities imposing mandatory virus tests and quarantines on anyone with "African" contacts following an outbreak from "imported" cases in Guangzhou. The US Consulate has advised African Americans against traveling to Guangzhou due to ethnic tensions. Suifenhe authorities strengthen border controls with Russia in order to slow down the spread of the virus. Beijing authorities announce that they will reopen high schools on 27 April and middle schools on 11 May. Harbin authorities announce that people entering from Russia will be held at a quarantine center for 14 days before self-quarantining at their homes for 14 days, and also that they will lockdown residential units in which coronavirus and asymptomatic cases are found.

Japanese Prime Minister Shinzo Abe encourages people to stay at home, posting a Twitter video of himself cuddling a dog and reading a book.

The North Korean government calls for stricter measures to check the spread of the coronavirus pandemic, without specifying whether there were any reported infections in the country.

=== 13 April ===
The Australian Health Minister Greg Hunt and New Zealand Prime Minister Jacinda Ardern both issue remarks to the media that it is too early to relax social distancing and lockdown restrictions in their countries.

Chinese Foreign Ministry spokesperson Zhao Lijian issues a statement rejecting US allegations that Chinese authorities in Guangzhou had mistreated Africans, accusing Washington of trying to harm Beijing's relations with African states. National Immigration Administration spokesperson Liu Haitao announces that China has reduced the number of people crossing its borders by 90% in an attempt to combat the spread of the coronavirus.

The Japanese island of Hokkaido declares a state of emergency again after reporting double digit increases in the number of coronavirus cases for five consecutive days.

South Korea announces that it will export 600,000 coronavirus testing kits to the United States in response to a request by President Trump.

=== 14 April ===
The Chinese Government approves two experimental coronavirus vaccines developed by a Beijing-based unit of Sinovac Biotech and the Wuhan Institute of Biological Products, an affiliate of the China National Pharmaceutical Group. Heilongjiang authorities establish a hotline for reporting illegal migrants crossing from Russia along with a reward system: 3,000 Yuan (US$426) for reporting illegal migrants, and 5,000 Yuan for apprehending illegal migrants and handing them over to the authorities. The Global Times urges Chinese citizens in Russia to remain in Russia and not to return in response to a spike in imported coronavirus cases from Russia. US fast food chain McDonald's apologizes after one of its branches in Guangzhou posted a sign saying that Africans were not welcome in response to tensions between locals and Africans.

In New Zealand, Civil Defence Minister Peeni Henare extends the country's national state of emergency for another seven days until 21 April.

=== 15 April ===
The Chinese Government urges the United States Government to fulfill its obligations to the World Health Organization after President Trump cut funding to the international organization.

An Associated Press report alleges that the Chinese Government suppressed news of the coronavirus outbreak in Wuhan for six days between 14 and 20 January 2020, causing the spread of the coronavirus disease.

Japanese Government Yoshihide Suga encourages Japanese citizens to limit their interaction with others in order to curb the spread of the coronavirus pandemic. While Japanese government policy is to limit interactions by 70 percent, compliance is not compulsory.

Japanese company Fujifilm announces that it intends to boost production of the drug Avigan by up to 100,000 treatment courses in order to test the drug as a potential treatment for COVID-19.

New Zealand Prime Minister Jacinda Ardern announced that all government ministers and public sector chief executives will take a 20 percent pay cut to combat the economic fallout of the coronavirus pandemic. Opposition Leader Simon Bridges has also confirmed that he will take a 20 percent pay cut.

South Korea holds its legislative election under lockdown conditions. Voters have to wear masks, gloves, undergo a fever check, and maintain social distancing while casting their ballot.

The Vietnamese Government issues a decree fining people who post so-called "fake news" between 10 and 20 million Vietnamese dongs (US$426-US$853), the equivalent of six months basic income.

=== 16 April ===
Australian Prime Minister Scott Morrison announces that Australia will maintain lockdown restrictions for at least four more weeks. The Australian Government intends to spend the next four weeks expanding testing, improving its contact tracing capability, and planning responses to local outbreaks. After the four weeks, the Government intends to review movement restrictions and the closure of businesses and schools.

Japanese Prime Minister Shinzo Abe extends the state of emergency imposed on seven prefectures to the rest of Japan. Several Japanese sake breweries have shifted to producing high-alcohol content liquids for alcohol-based hand sanitisers in order to address a shortage of hand sanitising liquid in Japan.

New Zealand Prime Minister Jacinda Ardern outlines the New Zealand Government's alert level 3 lockdown rules and restrictions. Key policies have included allowing people to swim and fish while banning boating; reopening early childhood centers and schools up to Year 10 on a voluntary basis; easing work restrictions; allowing ten people to attend funerals, weddings, and tangi; and allowing food eateries to provide take away services.

The South Korean Government reopens schools but instruction will be conducted remotely.

=== 17 April ===
Australian Prime Minister Scott Morrison suggests that lockdown measures including social distancing could remain for several months.

Chinese authorities have arrested 42 people for hoarding and driving up the price of material used to make face masks as well as illegally producing shoddy and inferior material for resale. The Chinese Government's budget officer also predicts that the country's economy will contract by 2% in 2020 due to stimulus measures raising the country's deficit to 8%, the largest gap since 1990.

The Prime Minister of Papua New Guinea James Marape enters into self-isolation after a staff member at the country's main coronavirus emergency treatment centre tests positive for the coronavirus.

In the Philippines, human rights groups call for the release of non-violent, sick and elderly prisoners in order to prevent the spread of the coronavirus within the country's prison system. This followed reports that 30 prisoners in Quezon City Jail were showing symptoms of the coronavirus and that 18 guards and prisoners at an unspecified prison had tested positive for the coronavirus.

=== 18 April ===
Australian Prime Minister Scott Morrison clarifies that a movement-tracking phone app tracing the contacts of infected Australians will not be made mandatory.

In China, the National Health Commission has ordered people working in the nursing, education, security and other sectors with high exposure to the public to undergo a nucleic acid test before leaving Wuhan.

Mutual recognition of health status inside Beijing-Tianjin-Hebei region began to take effect.

Taiwanese Health and Welfare Minister Chen Shih-chung announces that the Taiwanese Government will place 700 Republic of China Navy sailors under quarantine after three coronavirus cases were confirmed among sailors who had taken part in a goodwill trip to Palau.

=== 19 April ===
Australian Foreign Minister Marise Payne calls for an independent global inquiry into the origins of the coronavirus pandemic, including China's handling of the initial outbreak in Wuhan, without the involvement of the World Health Organization. The opposition Australian Labor Party's Health spokesperson Chris Bowen has supported the push and urged the Australian Government to win the support of other countries for the inquiry.

Yuan Zhiming, the head of the Wuhan Institute of Virology, has rejected allegations by the United States that the coronavirus originated at the institute's laboratory.

=== 20 April ===
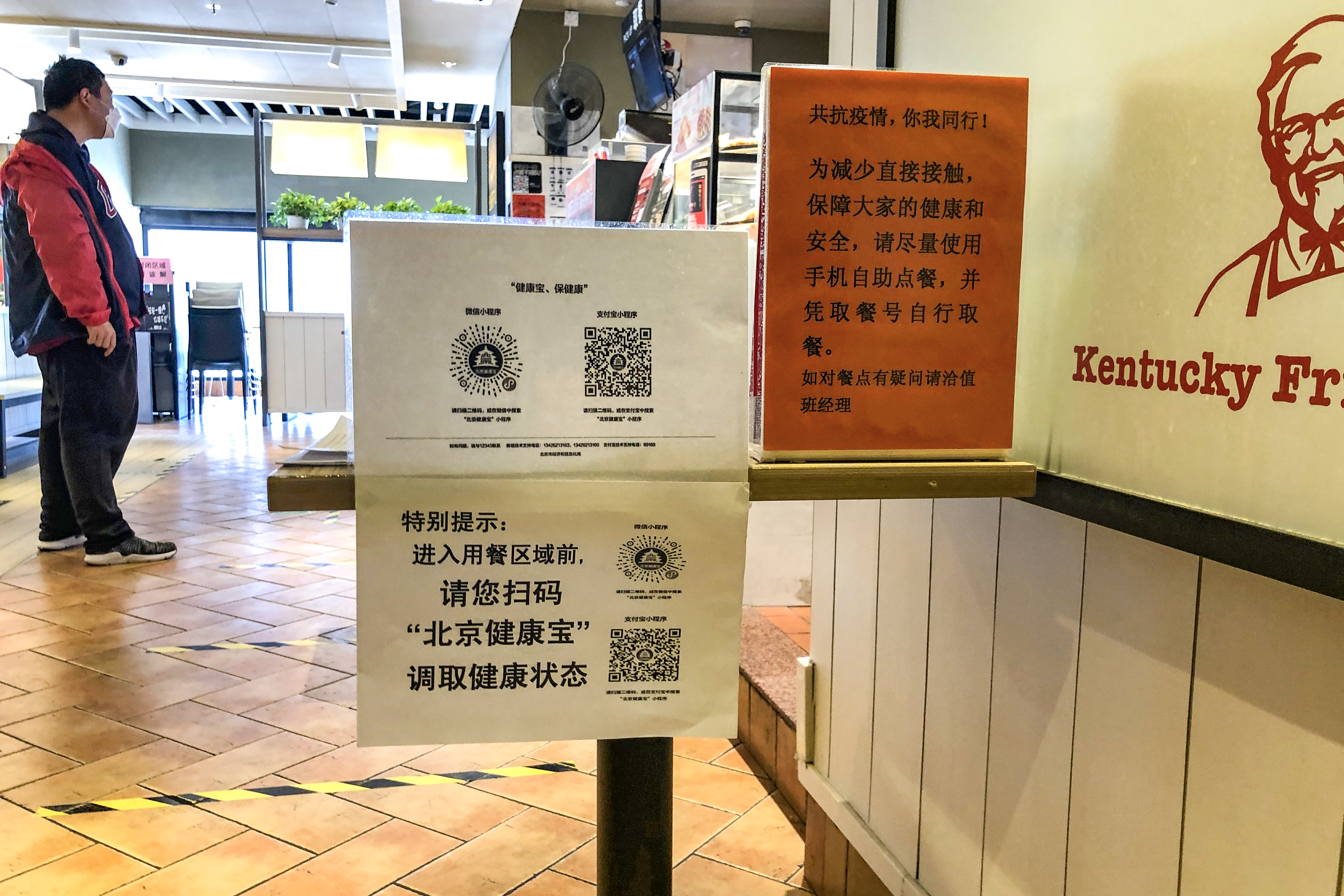
Notice advising visitors to show their Beijing Health Kit status at the entrance of a Kentucky Fried Chicken restaurant at Dongzhimen, Beijing

In Australia, authorities in Sydney and the Gold Coast have reopened several beaches including Coolangatta, Surfers Paradise, Coogee, and Malabar.

Chinese Foreign Ministry spokesperson Geng Shuang has defended China's handling of the coronavirus pandemic, rebuffing the Australian Foreign Minister Marise Payne's calls for an international investigation into the origins of the virus.

Beijing implements a new requirement for people to show their health information on Beijing Health Kit when entering restaurants.

New Zealand Prime Minister Jacinda Ardern extends New Zealand's Alert Level 4 lockdown by another week in order to "lock in gains" made in containing the spread of the coronavirus. The Alert Level 4 will end at 11:59 pm on 27 April with New Zealand entering into Alert Level 3 on 28 April for the duration of two weeks. Ardern also announced that schools and early childhood centres could reopen on 29 April.

=== 21 April ===
Australian airliner Virgin Australia enters into voluntary administration after failing to obtain a loan from the Australian Government. The company is now seeking new buyers and investors to prevent collapse.

Chief Executive of Hong Kong Carrie Lam has announced that Hong Kong will extend its coronavirus virus restrictions, banning public gatherings, closing most businesses, and banning entry by foreigners by another 14 days.

The Philippine Government has announced that it will step up coronavirus testing with the assistance of the Red Cross, aiming to test 1,000 samples daily.

The International Committee of the Red Cross has distributed 20 tonnes of healthcare, hygiene, and sanitation to Cambodia's Directorate General of Prisons and sponsored a 48-bed isolation facility in Manila.

=== 22 April ===
Australian Prime Minister Scott Morrison has sought international support for an international review into the origins of the coronavirus pandemic during phone calls with US President Donald Trump, German Chancellor Angela Merkel, and French President Emmanuel Macron. Beijing has accused Canberra of parroting the United States Government, which has criticized China and the World Health Organization's handling of the pandemic. In response, Macron has stated that it is not an "opportune time" for an international investigation into the coronavirus pandemic.

In Japan, authorities in Sakura, Chiba have razed 100,000 tulips to comply with social distancing rules following the cancellation of the annual tulip festival.

=== 23 April ===
Chinese Foreign Ministry spokesperson Hua Chunying has announced that China will be donating an addition US$30 million to the World Health Organization's efforts to combat the coronavirus, supplementing the US$20 million that China had already donated to the international organisation in March. Chinese Communist Party general secretary Xi Jinping has also announced that the Chinese Government will invest in various sectors including 5G, artificial intelligence, energy, and the employment of graduates.

The Vietnamese Government eases social distancing restrictions, citing the success of its policy involving mass quarantines and expansive social distancing.

=== 24 April ===
Australian Prime Minister Scott Morrison has confirmed that only authorised health personnel will have access to data in government smartphone software to trace the contacts and movements of people with the coronavirus. The cruise ship Ruby Princess has departed Australian waters. The Ruby Princess was a major cluster for the COVID-19 outbreak in Australia, accounting for ten percent of the country's 6,000 deaths and a third of the country's 77 deaths, triggering a criminal investigation by New South Wales authorities.

Chinese Foreign Ministry spokesperson Geng Shuang has issued a statement condemning cyber attacks on institutions fighting the coronavirus pandemic in response to a report by the US cybersecurity firm FireEye that Vietnamese government-linked hackers had tried to hack into the personal and professional email accounts of staff at the Chinese Ministry of Emergency Management and the Wuhan Government. Vietnam's foreign ministry denounced the report as "baseless."

The Financial Times has reported that Gilead Sciences's experimental anti-viral drug remdesivir has failed during its first test trial in China, based on leaked World Health Organization documents.

President of the Philippines Rodrigo Duterte extends Metro Manila's lockdown until 15 May. The extended lockdown covers several provinces on the island of Luzon. Three airlines including Philippines Airlines, Cebu Pacific, and the Filipino unit of Malaysian airliner AirAsia extend flight suspensions until mid-May. Cargo and special recovery flights are unaffected.

=== 25 April ===
Japan's Minister of Economy, Trade and Industry Yasutoshi Nishimura self-isolates after he came into contact with a staff member who had contracted the coronavirus.

Vanuatu, which has reported no cases of COVID-19, has announced that they will be holding their Women's Super League final and streaming it live on social media.

=== 26 April ===
The Australian Government has launched a new coronavirus tracing app based on Singapore's TraceTogether software that uses Bluetooth signals to record when people have been close to one another. While the Government has promised to legislate privacy protections, the app has been criticised for privacy issues and Amazon running the app's data storage.

Singapore has converted exhibition halls and other facilities into temporary hospitals for coronavirus patients in response to a surge in cases, mainly among foreign workers.

In South Korea, several churches including Onnuri Church have reopened, but worshippers are required to maintain social distancing, wear masks, and sit at designated seats. South Korea had previously eased its social distancing policy for some religious and sports facilities.

=== 27 April ===
In Australia, about 2 million people have downloaded the Australian Government's COVIDSafe tracing app. On the same day, Prime Minister Scott Morrison recorded a 68% approval rating for his handling of the pandemic.

Chinese authorities have arrested three individuals Chen Mei, Chai Wai, and "Tang" for contributing to "Terminu2049", an online archive of censored materials about the coronavirus outbreak on GitHub.

In Japan, the Osaka Prefecture has announced that it will name and shame pachinko parlours that continue to operate in defiance of coronavirus lockdown restrictions. Japan's economic revitalization minister Yasutoshi Nishimura was suspected of having COVID-19 but tested negative. Nishimura, who failed to meet the testing criteria for the coronavirus, was criticized for undergoing a PCR test, because many people with suspected COVID-19 infections in the country who were discouraged from having PCR tests felt that they were treated unfairly.

New Zealand prepares to move from a Level 4 to a Level 3 alert level at midnight on 28 April. As part of the Level 3 lockdown, schools up to Year 10 and early childhood centers will be allowed to reopen but children will be encouraged to stay at home; businesses can reopen but must comply with social distancing requirements; gatherings of up to ten people are allowed for weddings, funerals, and tangi; and low-risk recreational activities are allowed.

=== 28 April ===
In Australia, New South Wales authorities have reopened three beaches including Bondi Beach as part of a relaxation of lockdown measures.

The Director of the Wuhan Institute of Virology has rejected claims that the coronavirus originated in a Chinese laboratory, dismissing it as a conspiracy theory.

Chief Executive of Hong Kong Carrie Lam has announced that civil servants will be able to return to work from 4 May but that Hong Kong government has not made a decision over easing travel and social distancing measures due to expire next week.

The Japan Medical Association has advised against holding the 2020 Summer Olympics, which has been postponed to July 2021, unless a COVID-19 vaccine is developed. 300,000 masks that the Japanese Government had sent to pregnant women as part of a government handout were found to be faulty.

In Malaysia, Human Rights Watch's Asia Director Phil Robertson called on the Malaysian Government to stop detaining people who had flouted the movement control order put in place to combat the spread of the coronavirus. By 18 March, 15,000 had been arrested for breaching the movement control order.

Taiwanese Health Minister Chen Shih-chung has thanked United States Secretary of Health and Human Services Alex Azar for the United States' strong support for Taiwanese participation in the World Health Organization. Azar has expressed support for Taiwanese participation in WHO meetings and functions at the observer level.

=== 29 April ===
Australian Health Minister Greg Hunt has announced that Australia has purchased 10 million test kits from China for the purpose of conducting 10 million tests. Australia has so far carried out 500,000 tests.

China's national legislature, the National People's Congress will resume on 22 May. The People's Congress had been scheduled to start on 5 March but was suspended in response to the coronavirus pandemic. The Chinese People's Political Consultative Conference will also reconvene from 21 May. That same day, Beijing authorities announced that they would lower their COVID emergency responses from level II to level I; eliminating quarantine restrictions on some people arriving from low-risk areas in the country.

Japanese Prime Minister Shinzo Abe issued a statement that it would be difficult to hold the 2020 Summer Olympics in Tokyo next year unless the coronavirus pandemic is contained. Governor of Tokyo Yuriko Koike has called for an extension of Japan's state of emergency beyond 6 May.

Human Rights Watch's Asia Director Phil Robertson has criticised Cambodian Prime Minister Hun Sen for using the coronavirus pandemic as a pretext to arrest opposition supporters and critics of the government in response to the arrest of 30 people including 12 Cambodian National Rescue Party members on charges of spreading "fake news" and other offenses.

The International Monetary Fund's Managing Director Kristalina Georgieva has praised the Japanese Government's plans to spend 20 percent of its gross domestic product on tackling the economic fallout of the coronavirus pandemic and helping poor countries.

=== 30 April ===
The Hong Kong Government has announced that the first batch of 300 Hong Kong residents will depart the Pakistani capital Islamabad in a chartered flight. The returnees will be tested for the coronavirus and quarantined for 14 days. 1,600 Hong Kong residents remain stranded in Pakistan.

== See also ==
- Timeline of the COVID-19 pandemic
