= PREPARE =

European Union's project against epidemics

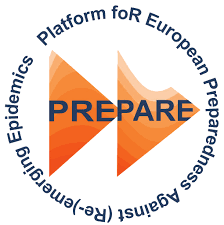
PREPARE logo

PREPARE is an acronym for the European Union's Platform for European Preparedness Against (Re-)emerging Epidemics. The coordinator is professor Herman Goossens of the University of Antwerp. It was activated on 31 December 2019 in response to coronavirus disease 2019 (COVID-19) and as of February 2020 was operating in outbreak response mode 2 (mobilisation), the second of three modes.

The PREPARE project was funded by EU Horizon funding. While active, it hosted three simulation exercises. PREPARE was followed by another COVID-19-specific project, called RECOVER.

== See also ==
- Exercise Cygnus
- Exercise Alice
- Crimson Contagion
