= Jennifer Nuzzo =

American epidemiologist

- Education: Rutgers University (BS); Harvard University (MS); Johns Hopkins University (DrPH)
- Spouse: Marc Kuchner
- Scientific career
- Fields: Global health, Epidemiology, Outbreak Response
- Institutions: Johns Hopkins Bloomberg School of Public Health; Brown University School of Public Health
- Thesis: Post-arrival Screening and Treatment of Foreign-born Individuals for Tuberculosis and Latent Tuberculosis Infection (2014)
- Doctoral advisor: Kenrad E. Nelson

Jennifer Nuzzo is an American epidemiologist. She is Director of the Pandemic Center and Professor of Epidemiology at the Brown University School of Public Health, having previously taught at the Johns Hopkins Bloomberg School of Public Health. She is also a Senior Fellow for Global Health at the Council on Foreign Relations.

== Early life and education ==
Nuzzo earned a Bachelor of Science from Rutgers University in 1999. She received a Master of Science from the Harvard T.H. Chan School of Public Health in 2001 and a Doctor of Public Health from the Johns Hopkins Bloomberg School of Public Health in 2014.

== Career ==
Nuzzo co-led the development of the Global Health Security Index, an assessment of global health security capabilities in 195 countries, performed by the Nuclear Threat Initiative (NTI) and the Johns Hopkins Center for Health Security together with The Economist Intelligence Unit (EIU). She is the director and principal investigator of the Outbreak Observatory, a research project working to document infectious disease outbreaks and how governments respond to them. Nuzzo serves as an associate editor of the Health Security journal. She participated in the Clade X bioterrorism preparedness exercise in May 2018.

She has often appeared in the media discussing how health systems respond to outbreaks, and has helped bring attention to dangers of delaying vaccination, the spread of the Ebola virus, and the COVID-19 pandemic. Her work has appeared in The New York Times, The Washington Post, USA Today, Fox News, Politico, The Hill, and The Boston Globe. She advises national governments, for-profit companies and nonprofit organizations on pandemic preparedness, including COVID-19.

She was previously the lead epidemiologist for the Johns Hopkins COVID-19 Testing Insights Initiative within the Johns Hopkins Coronavirus Resource Center.

Nuzzo was elected to the National Academy of Medicine in 2024 in recognition of her research on infectious disease threats. She was elected to the American Academy of Arts and Sciences in 2025 in the category of public affairs and public policy.

=== Criticism ===
Nuzzo was criticized for comments on the George Floyd protests in which large numbers of people broke social distancing and lockdown rules during the COVID-19 lockdowns; she said that to not protest against racism would cause greater public health risks than the virus.

== See also ==
- National Biosurveillance Strategy
