= International rankings of Bangladesh =

The following are international rankings of Bangladesh.

== Cities ==
- Dhaka City, Population of urban area ranked 2
- Dhaka, Most polluted city ranked 12

== Demographics ==
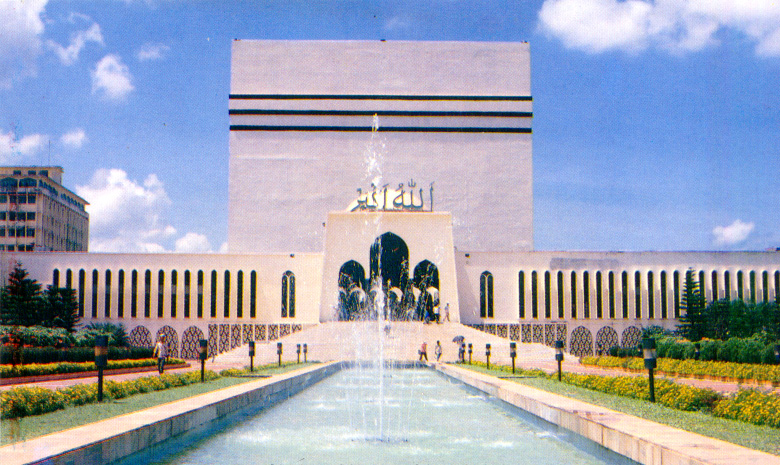
Baitul Muakrram is the national mosque of Bangladesh,

- Population: ranked 8th
- Population density ranked 10 out of 242 countries and territories
- Immigrant population ranked 26 out of 192 countries
- Labor force: ranked 8th
- Number of international migrants: ranked 37th

== Environment ==
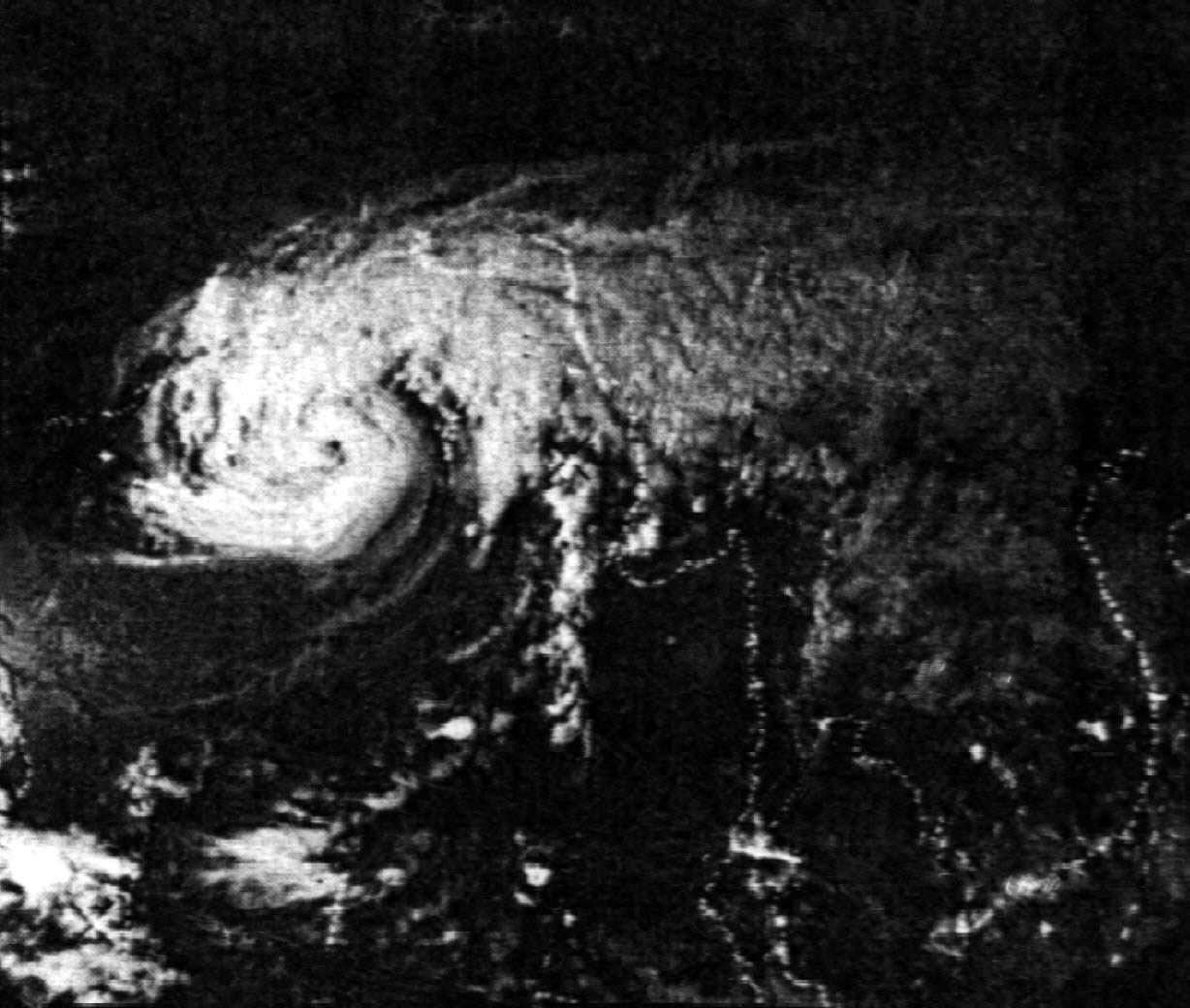
1970 Bhola Cyclone, most deadly cyclone in Bangladesh and world history.

- Environmental Performance Index: ranked 162nd
- World Risk Index: ranked 13th

== Geography ==
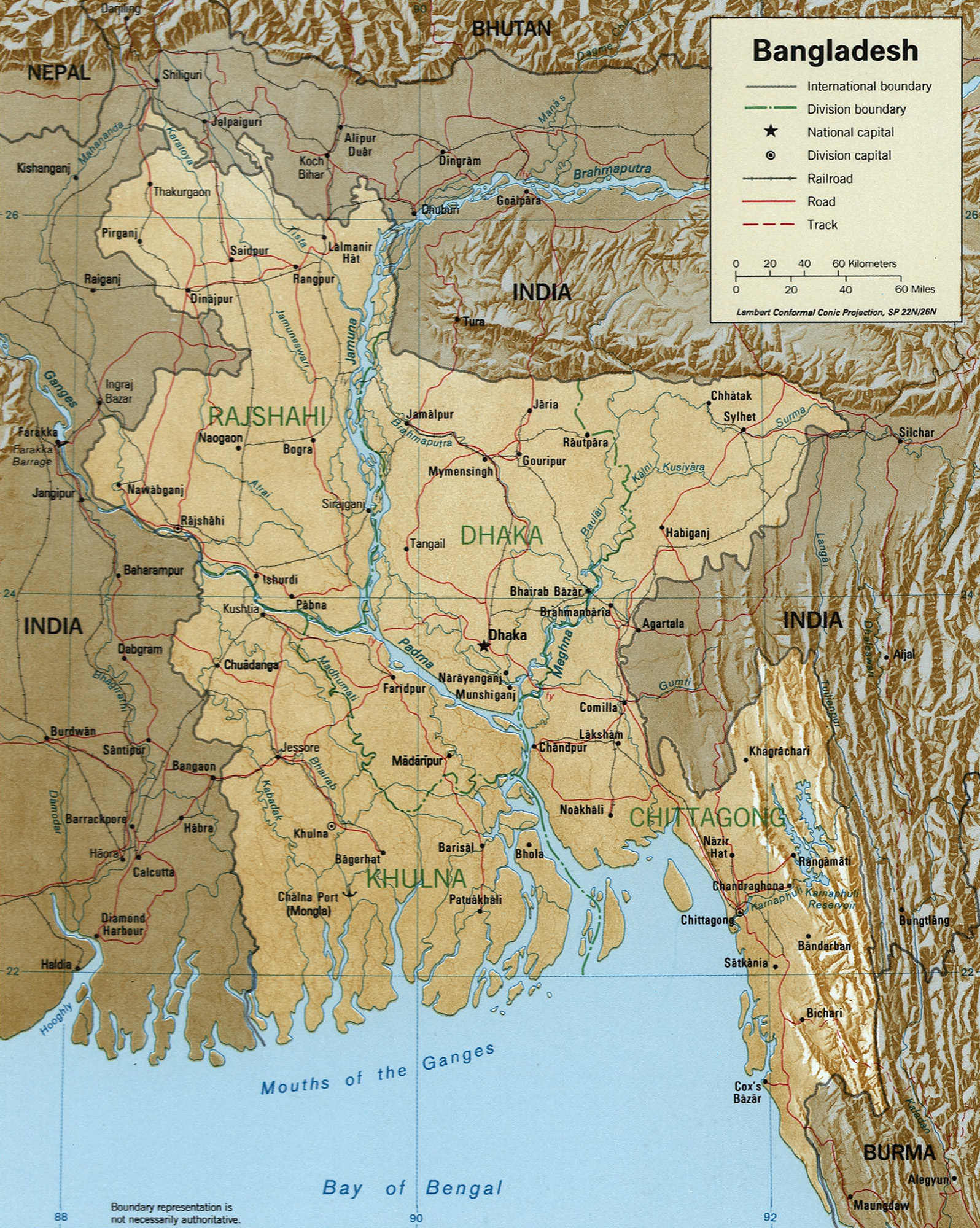
Map of Bangladesh

- Total area: ranked 94th
- Land area: ranked 94th
- Water area: ranked 39th
- Border length: ranked 42nd
- Coastline: ranked 88th

== Agriculture and production ==
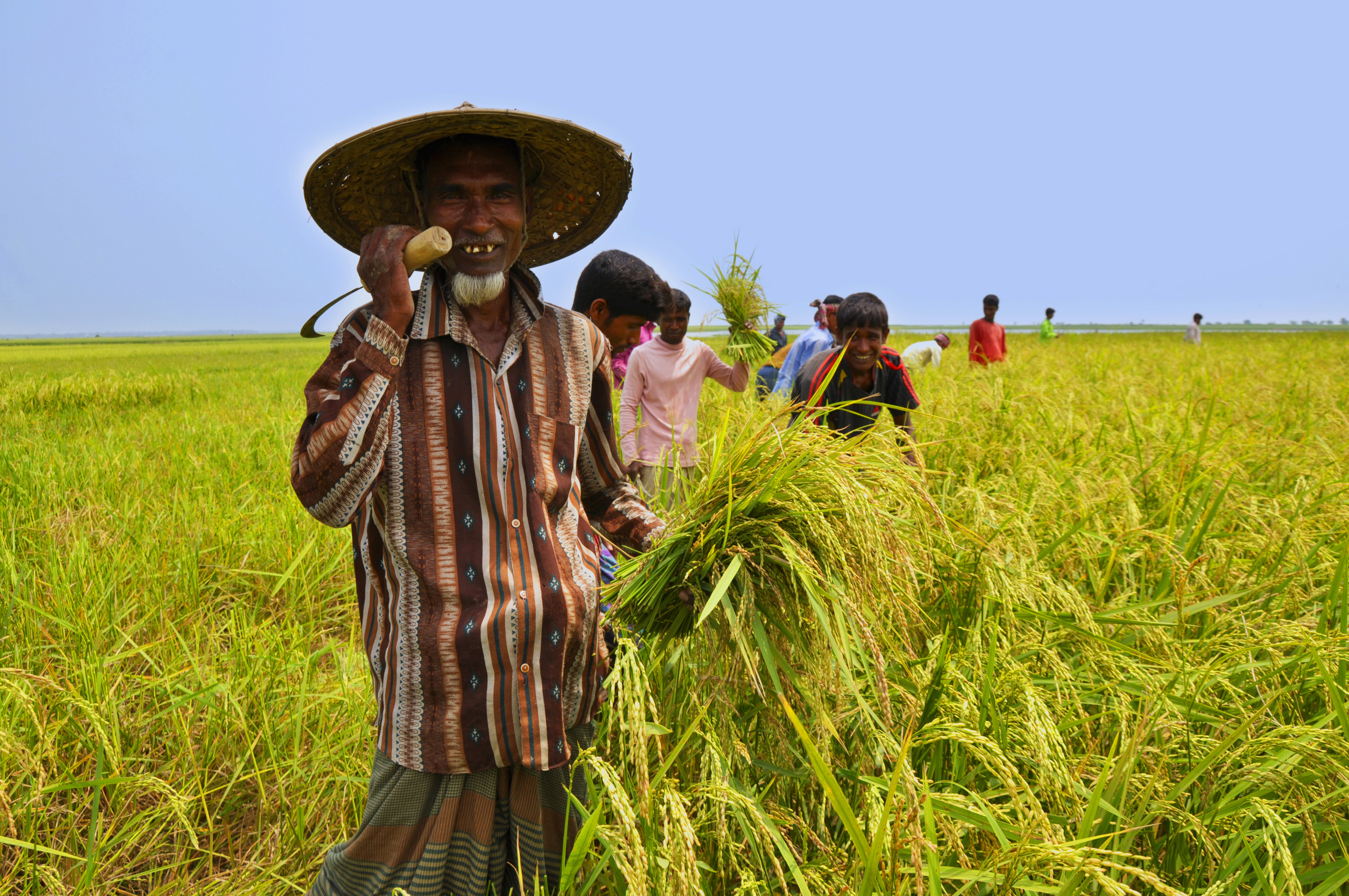
A Bangladeshi farmer

- Irrigated land by country, 2012: ranked 10th
- Barley production 2020: ranked 57th
- Rice production 2020: ranked 3rd
- Wheat production 2020: ranked 30th
- Onion production: ranked 9th
- Cabbage production: ranked 25th
- Cauliflower and broccoli production: ranked 9th
- Potato production: ranked 7th
- Soybean production: ranked 35th
- Cucumber production: ranked 48th
- Pumpkin production: ranked 16th
- Sugarcane production: ranked 33rd
- Tomato production: ranked 47th
- Garlic production: ranked 3rd

== Fruits production ==
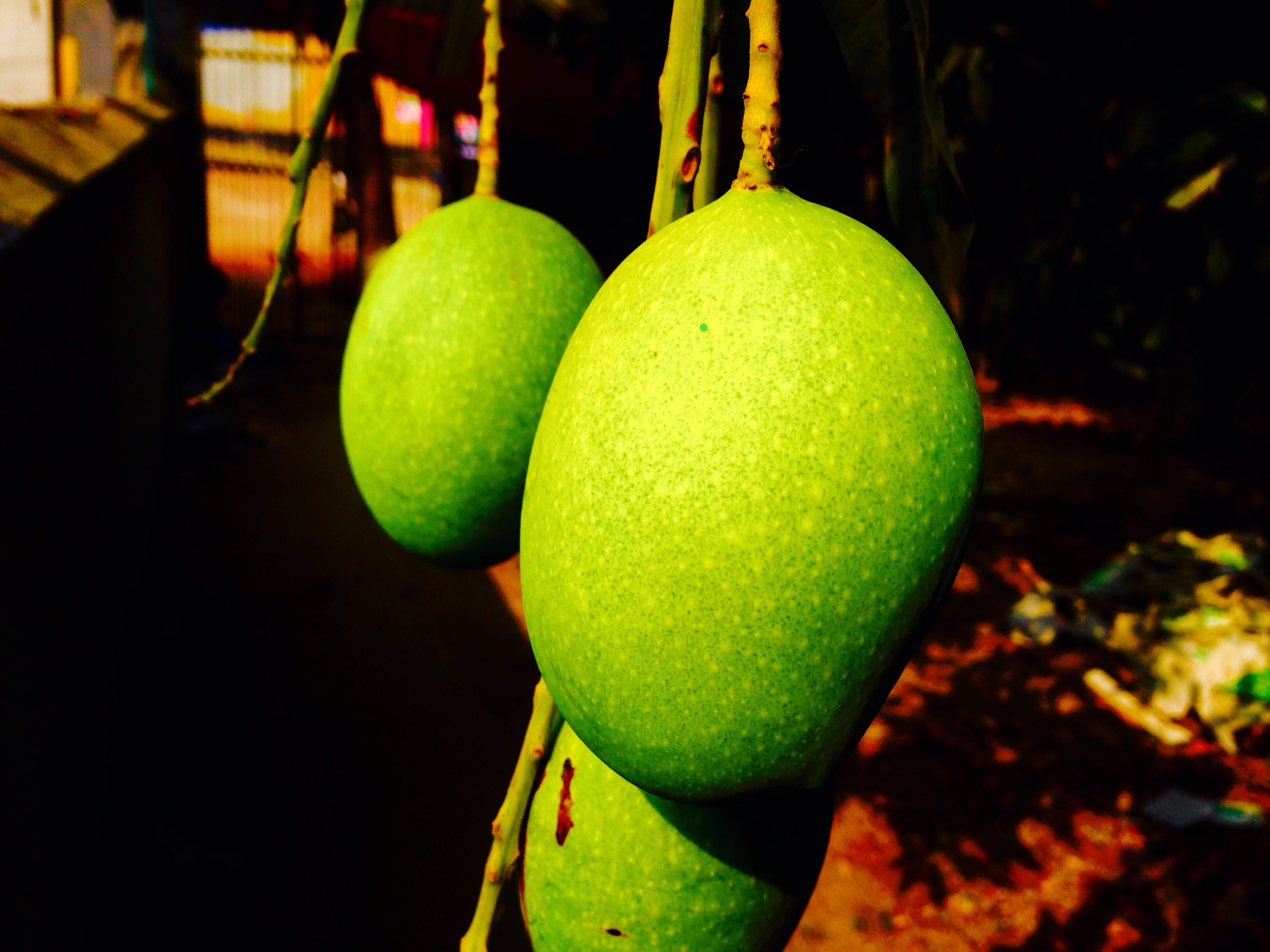
Mango

- Banana production: ranked 23rd
- Mango production: ranked 9th
- Papaya production: ranked 15th

== Economy ==
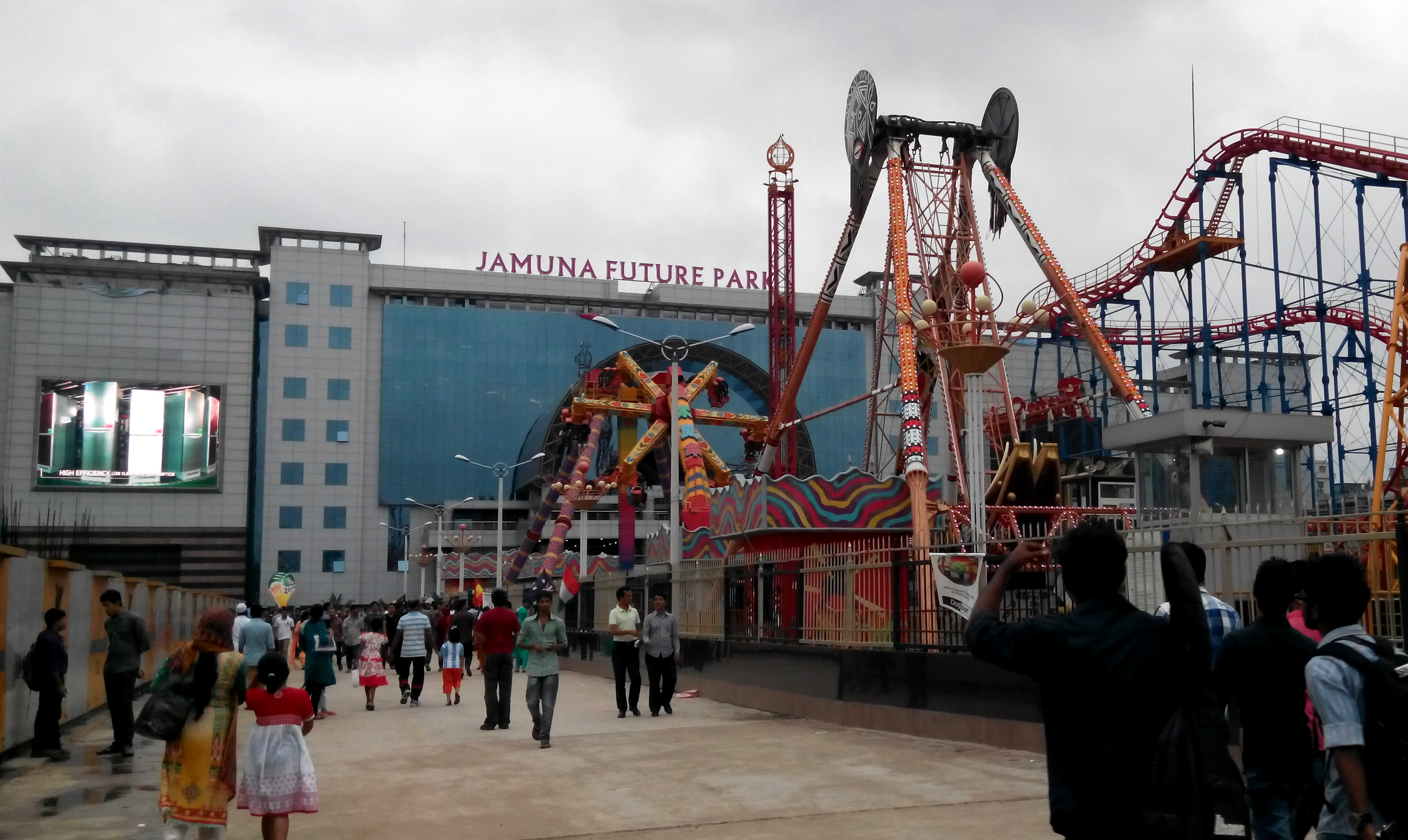
Jamuna Future Park, the largest shopping mall in South Asia

- Nominal GDP: ranked 41st
- Nominal GDP per capita: ranked 161st
- Nominal GDP growth rate: ranked 82nd
- GDP (PPP): ranked 30th
- GDP (PPP) per capita: ranked 167th
- GDP (PPP) per capita growth rate: ranked 11th
- Remittance receiving: ranked 8th
- Foreign reserve: ranked 44th
- Ease of doing business: ranked 168th
- Exports: ranked 52nd
- Imports: ranked 47th
- Unemployment rate: ranked 159th

== Society ==
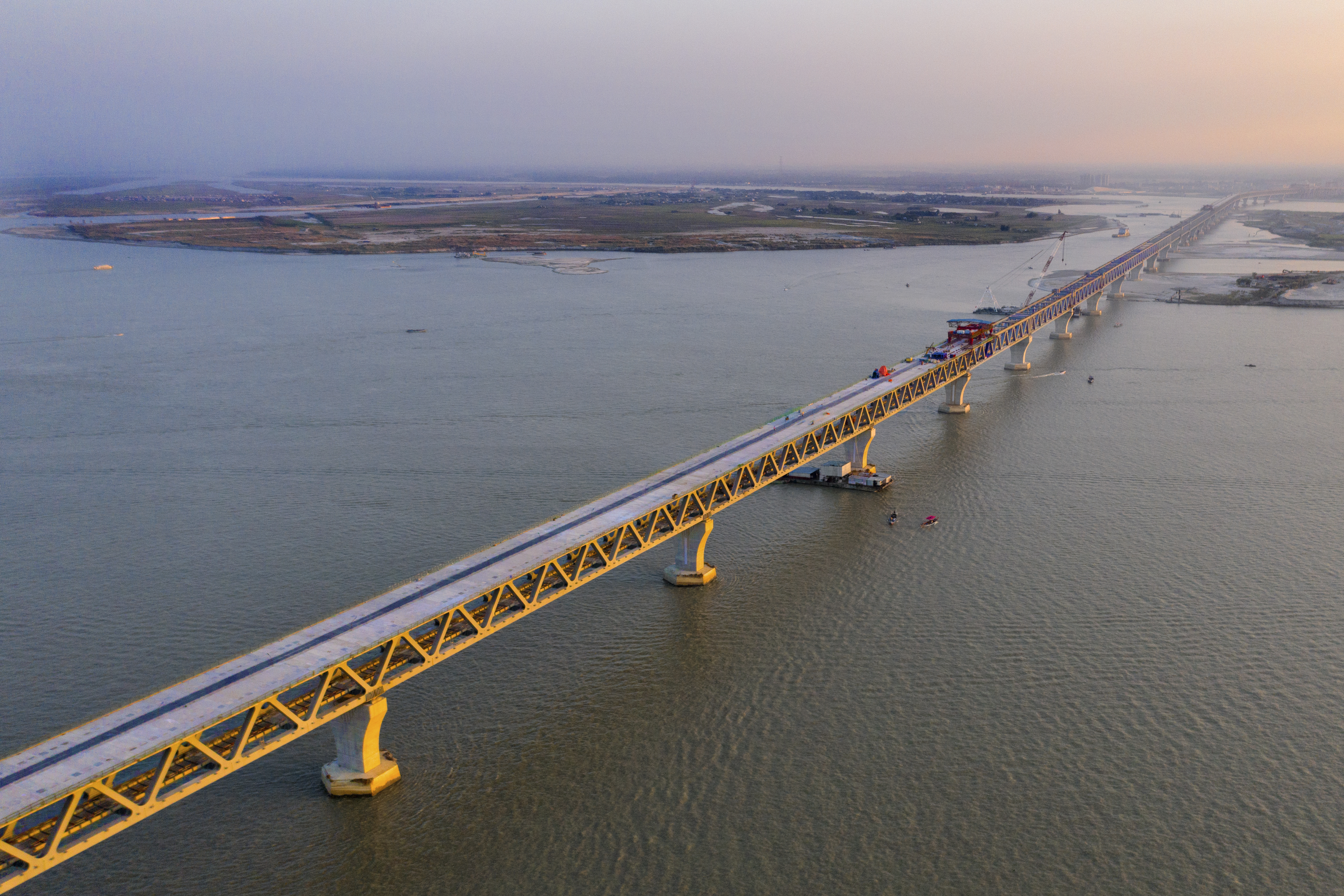
Padma Bridge is an under construction mega project of Bangladesh.

- Human Development Index: ranked 133rd
- Global Peace Index: ranked 91st
- Global Hunger Index: ranked 76th
- Global Health Security Index: ranked 95th
- Global Education Index: ranked 120th
- Population below poverty line: ranked 80th

== Communications ==
- Number of mobile phone users: ranked 8th
- Number of internet users: ranked 9th
- Number of Facebook users: ranked 10th

== Energy ==
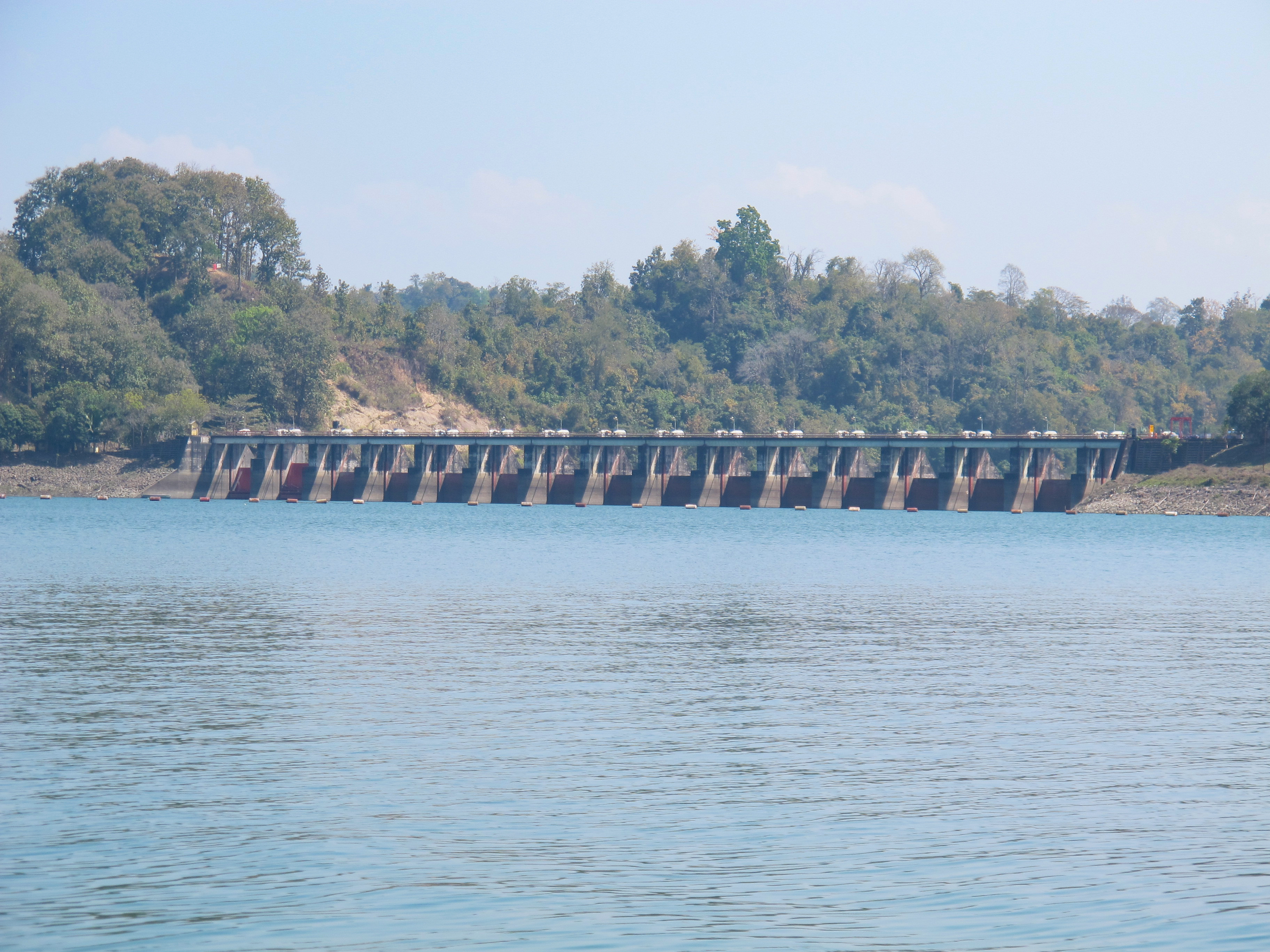
Kaptai Dam

- Total energy production: ranked 49th
- Natural gas consumption: ranked 30th
- Electricity production: ranked 40th
- Electricity consumption: ranked 50th

== Industry ==
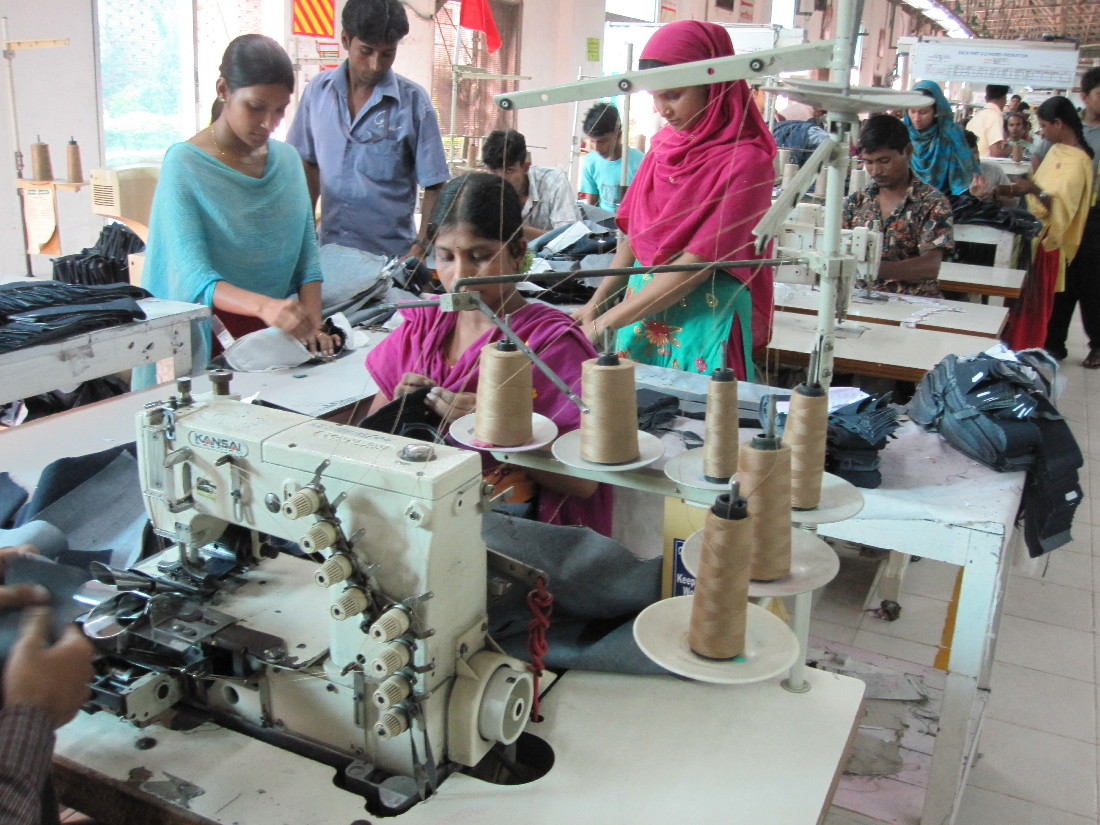
Women's in Bangladeshi Garments

- Salt production: ranked 24th
- Textile industry: ranked 2nd
- Pharmaceuticals: ranked 71st
- IT: ranked 102nd

== Security ==
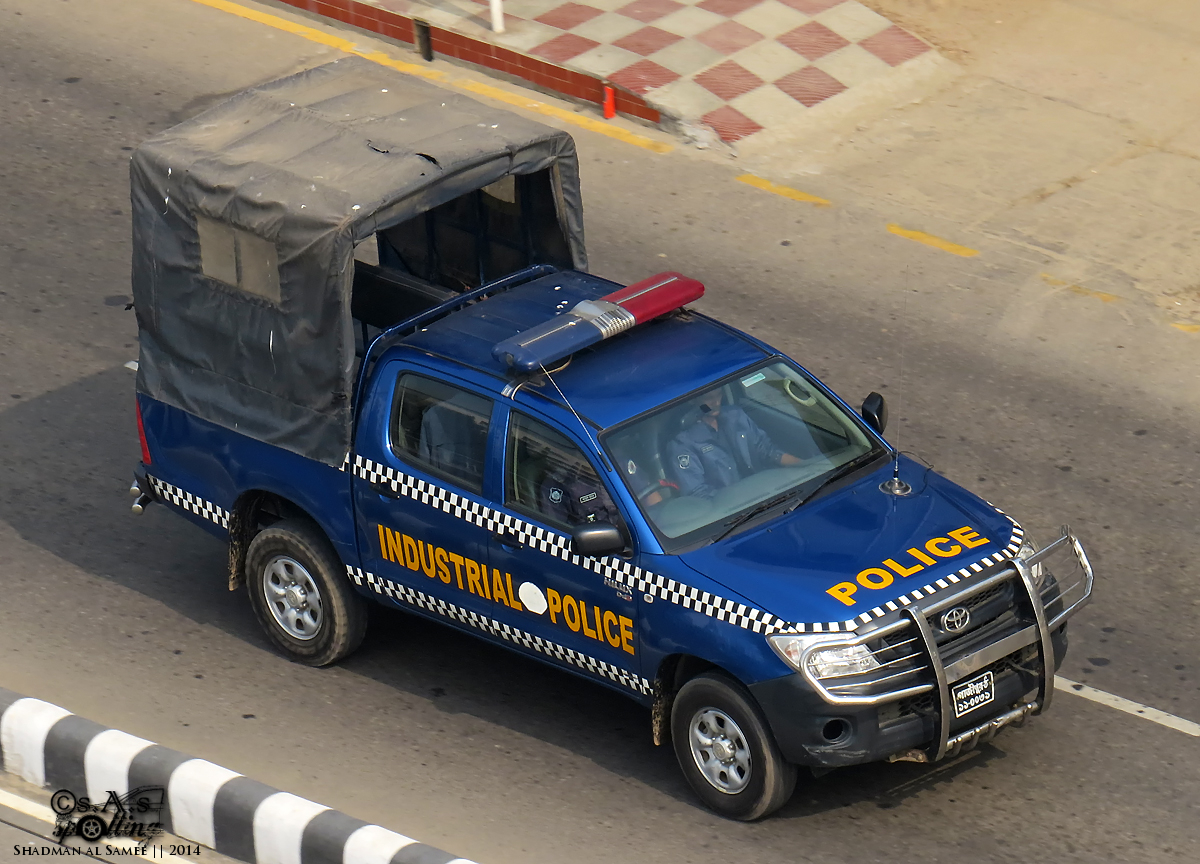
Bangladesh Police Vehicle

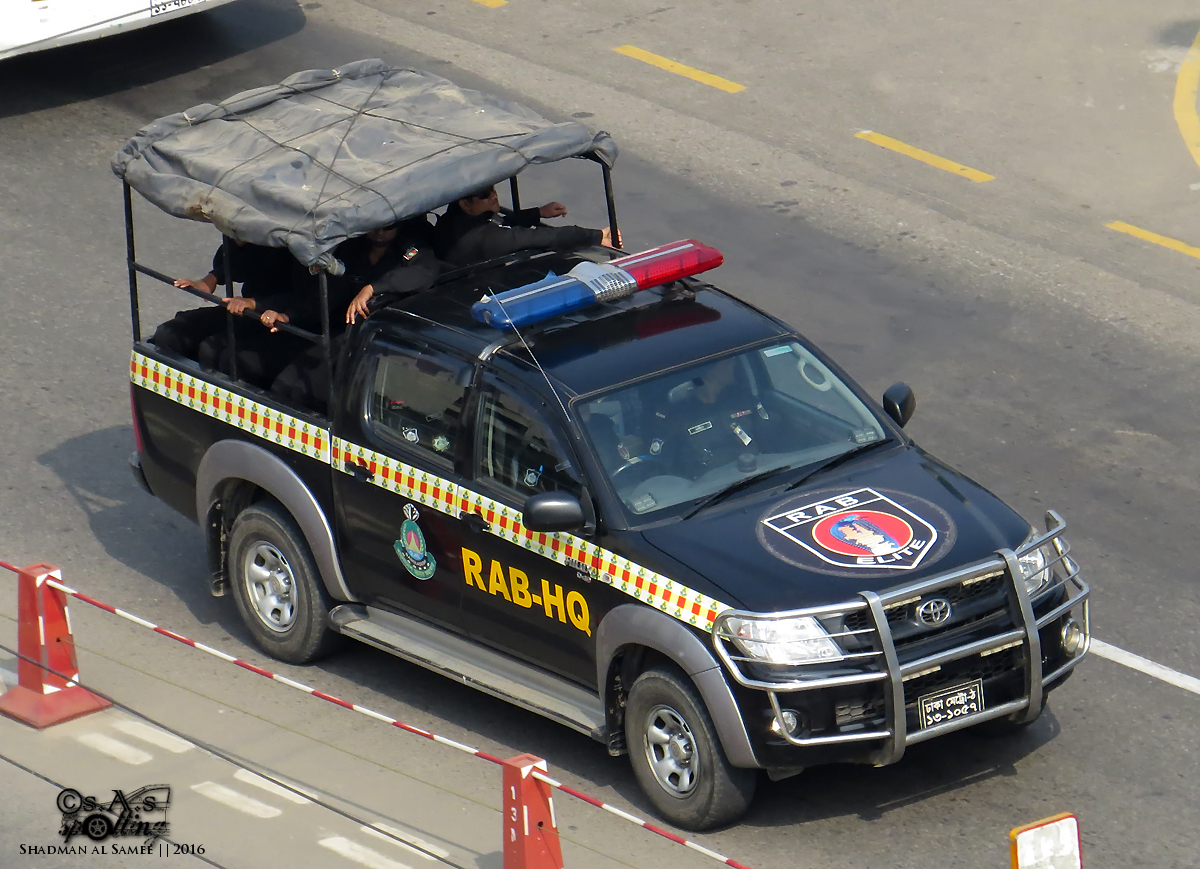
Rapid Action Battalion (RAB) is a special security force of Bangladesh

- Number of police personnel: ranked 16th
- National Cyber Security Index: ranked 65th
- Largest single force: ranked 1st

== Cities ==
- Largest city by population, 2020: Dhaka, ranked 7th
- Most expensive city for expatriates 2020: Dhaka, ranked 26th

== Technology ==
- World Intellectual Property Organization: Global Innovation Index 2026, ranked 105 out of 139 countries
