= Cheryl Healton =

American public health researcher

Cheryl Gillen Healton
- Education: Columbia University; New York University
- Scientific career
- Workplaces: New York University
- Thesis: In harms way : urban minority youth and the AIDS epidemic (1991)

Cheryl Healton is an American public health researcher who is Professor of Public Health Policy and Dean of School of Global Public Health at New York University. Her research considers public health policy surrounding tobacco control.

== Early life and education ==
Healton started her academic career at the New England College, where she majored in psychology and sociology. She earned a Master of Public Administration (MPA) in health policy and planning at New York University. She moved to Columbia University as a doctoral student, and earned a Doctor of Public Health (DrPH) in 1991. Her doctoral research considered the AIDS epidemic amongst young people from minority groups in urban areas.

== Research and career ==
Healton joined the faculty at Columbia University, where she held various leadership positions including Vice President for Health Sciences and Associate Dean for Program Development. In 2012 she moved to New York University, where she was made Dean of School of Global Public Health.

Healton has studied public health topics including HIV/AIDS, tobacco control and substance abuse. She is the founder of Legacy (now known as Truth Institute), an organization that is committed to tobacco control. The focus of Legacy is to enable young people to reject tobacco, and permit current smokers to quit. She created the youth tobacco prevention program “truth”, which was successful in reducing the number of young smokers. Legacy established the Steven A. Schroeder Institute for Tobacco Studies, as well as a national campaign on smoking cessation in 2007. She was made Dean of the School of Public Health. She focused on training public health practitioners such that they can meet the needs of the communities they serve.

During the COVID-19 pandemic, Healton joined the leadership team of the COVID collaborative.

== Awards and honors ==
- 2013 Prevent Cancer Foundation James L. Mulshine, MD National Leadership Award
- 2013 Society For Research On Nicotine and Tobacco President's Award
- 2013 American Public Health Association Allan Rosenfield Award for Public Health and Social Justice

== Selected publications ==
- 2008 PHS Guideline Update Panel, Liaisons, and Staff (September 1, 2008). "Treating tobacco use and dependence: 2008 update U.S. Public Health Service Clinical Practice Guideline executive summary". Respiratory Care. 53 (9): 1217–1222. ISSN 0020-1324. PMID 18807274. Wikidata Q53991122.
- Matthew C Farrelly; Cheryl G Healton; Kevin C Davis; Peter Messeri; James C Hersey; M Lyndon Haviland (June 2002). "Getting to the truth: evaluating national tobacco countermarketing campaigns". American Journal of Public Health. 92 (6): 901–7. doi:10.2105/ajph.92.6.901. ISSN 1541-0048. PMC 1447480. PMID 12036775. Wikidata Q24544249.
- Matthew C Farrelly; Kevin C Davis; M Lyndon Haviland; Peter Messeri; Cheryl G Healton (March 2005). "Evidence of a dose-response relationship between "truth" antismoking ads and youth smoking prevalence". American Journal of Public Health. 95 (3): 425–31. doi:10.2105/ajph.2004.049692. ISSN 1541-0048. PMC 1449196. PMID 15727971. Wikidata Q24544775.
