= Herman Goossens =

Herman Goossens (born 1957) is professor of microbiology at the University of Antwerp where he is head of the Laboratory of Medical Microbiology, part of PREPARE, the European Union's Platform for European Preparedness Against (Re-)emerging Epidemics of which he is the coordinator.

He is a graduate of the Vrije Universiteit Brussel.
