= Doctor of Public Health =

Public health professional degree

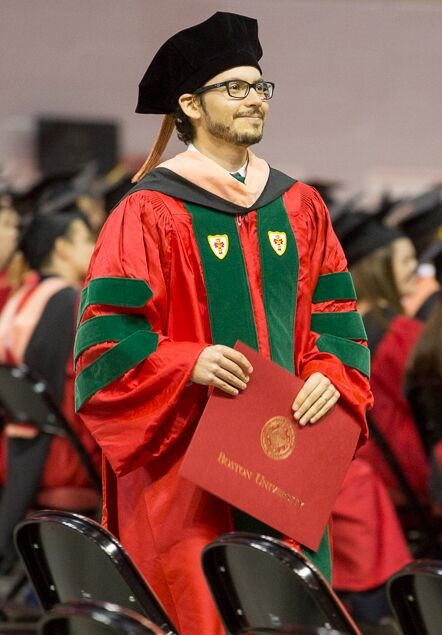
A Doctor of Public Health at Boston University in his full academic regalia. Note that the color of the hood, salmon pink, is the unique academic color of Public Health, which differs from a PhD in other disciplines (usually blue).

A Doctor of Public Health (abbr. DrPH, Dr.P.H. or D.P.H.; Latin doctor publica sanitas) is a doctoral degree awarded in the field of public health. DrPH is an advanced and terminal degree that prepares its recipients for a career in advancing public health practice, leadership, research, teaching, or administration. The first DrPH degree was awarded by Harvard Medical School in 1911.

According to the United Nations, the world faces unprecedented challenges such as climate change, noncommunicable diseases, aging populations, health crises, a widening wealth gap, and the overreliance on the internet. DrPH graduates, who received trainings in evidence-based public health practice and research, are expected to have the competences to convene diverse stakeholders, communicate across a range of sectors, and settings, synthesize findings, and generate practice-based evidence.

Given the core competencies developed during the program, DrPH graduates often occupy executive leadership roles in private and public sectors along with non-profits, universities and multilateral entities such as WHO and the World Bank. In addition, some DrPH graduates pursue academia including teaching and research.

== Core Competency Model ==
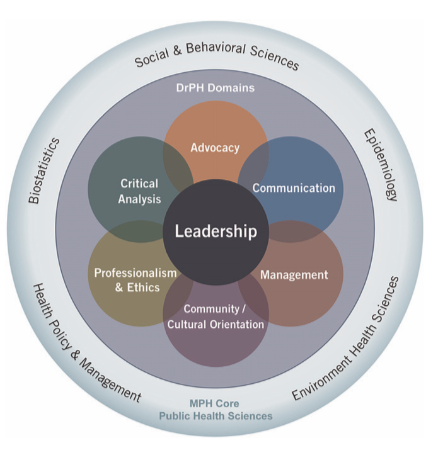
Doctor of Public Health (DrPH) Core Competency Model

The common elements addressed in all DrPH degrees are: 1) a professionally oriented and competency-based curriculum and 2) core competency domains. The DrPH core competency model highlights the transformative leadership role that DrPH graduates play in advancing the field of research and practice in public health. According to The Association of Schools of Public Health (ASPH), the DrPH competency model has seven domains of skills that every DrPH program should aim to develop:

- Advocacy: Ability to influence decision-making processes related to public health policies and practices.
- Communication: Ability to assess and to use communication strategies across different audiences and stakeholders.
- Community/Cultural orientation: Ability to communicate and interact with people from diverse communities, nationalities, and cultures.
- Critical Analysis: Ability to synthesize and apply evidence-based research and theory from different fields to solve public health challenges.
- Leadership: Ability to create and communicate a shared vision, inspire trust, and motivate others to achieve higher goals or an enlightened purpose.
- Management: Ability to provide responsible strategic and operational guidance within public and private organizations to achieve individual and community health and wellbeing.
- Professionalism and Ethics: Ability to identify, discuss, and analyze an ethical issue, and balance the claims of personal liberty with the responsibility to protect the health of a population.

Combined, these skills allows DrPH graduates to create linkages and synergies between research and practice. Often, rather than serving as technical experts, DrPH graduates are more likely to supervise or collaborate with technical experts to solve multifaceted 21st century problems. For instance, their roles require breadth across many areas of public health rather than depth of technical skills in a single one. By having these competencies the ASPH considers the DrPH a professional degree offered for advanced education and training in public health leadership. An entire list of domains and skills can be found here.

== DrPH vs. PhD in Public Health ==
A DrPH degree is categorized as a terminal degree on a par with the degree of PhD, Doctor of Medicine, Doctor of Education, Doctor of Social Work, or Doctor of Psychology. Awarding of a such degree signifies recognition of distinguished scholarly accomplishment in the professional field. However, a DrPH is primarily designed for those who plan careers involving professional practice, teaching, or research, and often emphasizes interdisciplinary studies. In comparison, a PhD is primarily a research-based degree focusing on mastering one specific topic within a certain public health field. Nevertheless, some PhD holders would become scholar-practitioners in their later careers.

=== Differences in Admission Requirements ===
Traditionally, admission into a DrPH program requires a master of public health degree as a prerequisite; however, this is changing and more schools now are accepting students without any master's degree or with other degrees (i.e., MD, DO). Generally, DrPH programs require several years of public health leadership and practice experience (usually 5 years or more) for an admission. In contrast, one may enter a PhD or ScD program after completing a bachelor (undergrad) degree with no experience or advanced academic training.

The number of DrPHs awarded annually is quite low compared with the number of PhDs awarded. This is because the DrPH is a specialized doctoral degree, whereas the PhD is a general doctoral degree. For example, in 2010, there were only 126 DrPH awarded, in contrast to the 776 PhD awarded from 26 of the 46 accredited schools of public health in the US.

=== Career Outcomes Training Difference ===
DrPH: Leadership and public health practice, implementation of PhD research, public health policy, politics, and academia to a lesser extent.

PhD: Research and academia.

== Typical DrPH Program Structure ==
=== Advanced Integrative Coursework ===
A typical accredited DrPH program requires roughly a one to two-year long intensive multidisciplinary coursework in advanced research methodology, similar to a PhD in some countries. Additionally, as a distinction and addition to a PhD, DrPH students also take advanced courses to gain analytical skills in leadership, management, systems thinking, enabling change, communications, and health policy.

=== Public Health Leadership Practice Experience ===
DrPH students are also required to complete a public health practice experience as a critical part of their DrPH program. Students apply the skills learned in public health practice to gain leadership experience and hone their skills through hands-on and a field-based culminating public health experience.

Most universities require a rigorous comprehensive exam at the end of first two-years of coursework and a public health practical experience before a candidate may be advanced to the capstone project phase. For example, the DrPH programs at Tufts and Harvard require a qualifying exam taken at the end of the first year.

=== Capstone Projects ===
DrPH students are required to complete and defend an applied public health practice-related capstone project during their candidacy phase, usually after the comprehensive and qualifying exams.

== DrPH Completion Time ==
The typical time to complete a DrPH is 3–4 years, depending on the curriculum, previous experience, and education. It is recommended that one have a MPH (Master of Public Health) degree to shorten time in the DrPH program.

== Universities Offering the DrPH Degree ==
=== United States ===
Some of the universities offering DrPH in the USA are listed below.

- Boston University School of Public Health
- Capella University
- City University of New York (CUNY) Graduate Center
- Claremont Graduate University School of Community & Global Health
- Colorado School of Public Health
- Columbia University Mailman School of Public Health
- Drexel University School of Public Health
- East Carolina University at the Brody School of Medicine
- East Tennessee State University College of Public Health
- Emory University Rollins School of Public Health
- Florida A & M University Institute of Public Health
- Georgia Southern University Jiann-Ping Hsu College of Public Health
- Georgia State University School of Public Health
- Harvard School of Public Health
- Georgia Southern University Jiann-Ping Hsu College of Public Health
- Indiana University-Purdue University Indianapolis Richard M. Fairbanks School of Public Health
- Jackson State University College of Health Sciences
- Johns Hopkins Bloomberg School of Public Health
- Loma Linda University School of Public Health
- Medical College of Wisconsin
- Mercer University
- Morgan State University School of Community Health and Policy
- New York Medical College School of Public Health
- New York University School of Global Public Health
- Pennsylvania State University College of Medicine
- Ponce Health Science University
- Rutgers University School of Public Health
- San Diego State University School of Public Health
- SUNY Downstate Medical Center
- Texas A&M Health Science Center School of Rural Public Health
- The George Washington University School of Public Health and Health Services
- Tulane University School of Public Health and Tropical Medicine
- Uniformed Services University of the Health Sciences
- University at Albany, SUNY School of Public Health
- University of Alabama at Birmingham School of Public Health
- University of Arizona Mel and Enid Zuckerman College of Public Health
- University of Arkansas for Medical Sciences Fay W. Boozman College of Public Health
- University of California, Berkeley
- University of Georgia College of Public Health
- University of Illinois at Chicago School of Public Health
- University of Iowa College of Public Health
- University of Kentucky's College of Public Health
- University of Medicine and Dentistry of New Jersey School of Public Health
- University of Nebraska Medical Center
- University of North Carolina at Chapel Hill Gillings School of Global Public Health
- University of North Texas Health Science Center at Fort Worth, School of Public Health
- University of Oklahoma Health Sciences Center School of Public Health
- University of Pittsburgh Graduate School of Public Health
- University of Puerto Rico Graduate School of Public Health
- University of South Florida College of Public Health
- University of Texas Health Science Center at Houston School of Public Health
- Walden University College of Health Professions

=== United Kingdom ===
- London School of Hygiene and Tropical Medicine
- Chester University
- Teesside University

=== Asia ===
- Department of Community Medicine, School of Medical Sciences, Universiti Sains Malaysia
- Department of Community Health, Faculty of Medicine and Health Sciences, Universiti Putra Malaysia
- Department of Community Health, Faculty of Medicine, National University of Malaysia
- Department of Social and Preventive Medicine, Faculty of Medicine, University of Malaya
- School of Public Health, Peking University Health Science Center
- College of Public Health, University of the Philippines Manila
- Department of Public Health Nursing, Faculty of Public health, Mahidol University, Bangkok, Thailand
- Department of Public Health, Faculty of Public health, Naresuan University, Phitsanulok, Thailand
- Faculty of Public health, Thammasat University, Lampang, Thailand
- Faculty of Public Health, Kasetsart University Chalermphrakiat Sakon Nakhon Province Campus, Sakon Nakhon, Thailand
- Kyoto University School of Public Health, Japan

=== Australia ===
- James Cook University School of Public Health and Tropical Medicine.
- La Trobe University School of Public Health.
- University of Wollongong School of Health Science.
- University of New South Wales School of Public Health and Medicine (Future Health Leaders Program).
- Monash University School of Public Health.
- Flinders University School of Public Health.
- Curtin University.

=== France ===
- University of Paris-Saclay
- Paris Descartes University
- University of Bordeaux
- University of Lorraine

=== Germany ===
- Technische Universität Berlin
- Bielefeld University
- University of Bremen
- Heinrich Heine University Düsseldorf
- Hochschule Fulda
- Hannover Medical School

=== Canada ===
- University of Toronto Dalla Lana School of Public Health
- University of Montreal École de santé publique de l’Université de Montréal

== Notable Holders of the DrPH Degree ==
- Sara Josephine Baker - American physician notable for making contributions to public health, especially in the immigrant communities of New York City.
- Sandro Galea - Dean of the Boston University School of Public Health.
- Cheryl Healton - Dean of the College of Global Public Health at New York University.
- Vicenç Navarro - Spanish sociologist and political scientist currently holding a chair in Social Sciences at the Pompeu Fabra University in Barcelona.
- Barbara Rimer - Dean of the University of North Carolina at Chapel Hill Gillings School of Global Public Health.
- Henry F. Vaughan - Founder and former Dean of the University of Michigan School of Public Health. Past president of the American Public Health Association.
- Jennifer Nuzzo - Lead epidemiologist for the Johns Hopkins COVID-19 Testing Insights Initiative and Associate Professor in the Department of Environmental Health and Engineering at the Johns Hopkins Bloomberg School of Public Health

== See also ==
- Doctor of Public Administration
- Doctor of Health Administration
- Professional degrees of public health
