= Marc Kuchner =

American astrophysicist

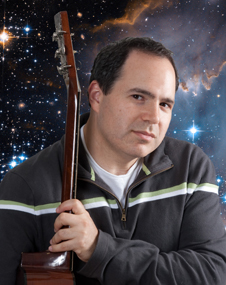
- Born: August 7, 1972 (age 54); Montreal, Quebec, Canada
- Education: Harvard University, California Institute of Technology
- Known for: Detection of exoplanetary systems, Theory of formation of circumstellar disks and planets, citizen science and science communication.
- Scientific career
- Fields: Planetary astronomy
- Website: eud.gsfc.nasa.gov/Marc.Kuchner/home.html

Marc Kuchner (born August 7, 1972) is an American astrophysicist, and the Citizen Science Officer at NASA Headquarters. He is known for his work on citizen science, and imaging of disks and exoplanets. Together with Wesley Traub, he invented the band-limited coronagraph, used on the James Webb Space Telescope (JWST), originally designed for the proposed Terrestrial Planet Finder (TPF) telescope. He is also known for his novel supercomputer models of planet-disk interactions and for developing the ideas of ocean planets, carbon planets, and helium planets.

Kuchner appears as an expert commentator in the National Geographic television show Alien Earths and frequently answers the "Ask Astro" questions in Astronomy magazine. Kuchner helped found several citizen science projects, including Disk Detective and Backyard Worlds.

== Background ==
Kuchner was born in Montreal, Quebec, Canada. He received his bachelor's degree in physics from Harvard in 1994 and his Ph.D. in astronomy from California Institute of Technology (Caltech) in 2000. His doctoral thesis advisor was Michael E. Brown. After he earned his Ph.D., Kuchner studied at the Center for Astrophysics | Harvard & Smithsonian as a Michelson Fellow, and then at Princeton University as a Hubble Fellow.

Kuchner's parents are neurosurgeon Eugene Kuchner and psychologist Joan Kuchner. His wife is epidemiologist Jennifer Nuzzo.

== Marketing for Scientists ==
Kuchner is the author of a book, Marketing for Scientists: How to Shine in Tough Times (2011, Island Press). The book provides career and communication advice for scientists using the language of marketing, with chapters on "business", "how to sell something," "branding" and so on. This approach struck some reviewers as cynical about human nature. But readers from a wide spectrum of scientific disciplines praised the book's unique angle and breadth of research. Ecology described it as "a must-read for ecologists and, indeed, for all scientists, mathematicians, and engineers at all career stages." Astrophysicist Neil deGrasse Tyson called it, "the first of its kind".

== Cosmic Collisions ==
Kuchner is the author of a series of books for children about astrophysics. The first is Cosmic Collisions: Asteroid vs. Comet (2024, MIT Kids Press).

== Prizes ==
- NASA Agency Honor Award, Diversity, Equity, Inclusion, and Accessibility Medal, 2024
- Robert H. Goddard Award, Backyard Worlds: Planet 9 Team, 2021
- Robert H. Goddard Award, Disk Detective Team, 2016
- Nautilus Book Awards Silver Winner, 2012
- SPIE early career achievement award.
