= Barbara Rimer =

Barbara K. Rimer is an American public health scholar. She served as dean of the Gillings School of Global Public Health at the University of North Carolina at Chapel Hill from 2005 to June 2022. She was appointed Alumni Distinguished Professor of Health Behavior at the university in 2003.

== Education ==
Graduated from the University of Michigan, Rimer received a Bachelor of Arts degree with a major in English in 1970 and a Master of Public Health degree in 1973. She received a Doctor of Public Health degree in health education from Johns Hopkins University in 1981.

== Career ==
Rimer served as a Program Director at the National Cancer Institute from 1975 to 1977. She then held positions at Fox Chase Cancer Center and Duke University in cancer prevention and control. In 1992, Rimer joined the faculty at the University of North Carolina at Chapel Hill as Adjunct Associate Professor of Health Behavior. From 1997 to 2002, she was Director of the Division of Cancer Control and Population Sciences at the National Cancer Institute. Rimer became Alumni Distinguished Professor of Health Behavior in the Gillings School of Global Public Health at the University of North Carolina at Chapel Hill in 2003. Soon after, she became Dean of the School. Rimer is also an adjunct professor at Duke Cancer Institute.

With respect to Rimer's national service, she was a member of the National Cancer Advisory Board from 1994 to 1997, and was later the first woman to chair this board. She was Chair of the President's Cancer Panel under two presidents, from 2011 to January 2019. Rimer has received numerous national awards and honors. She received the NIH Director's Award in 2000. She was elected to the National Academy of Medicine in 2008. She was awarded the American Cancer Society's Medal of Honor for her cancer control research in 2013.

Rimer's research has explored multiple areas, especially motivating people to be screened for cancer and enhancing their informed decision making. She has authored more than 270 peer-reviewed publications. She is co-editor of the classic text, Health Behavior: Theory, Research and Practice, now it its fifth edition.
