= Steven A. Schroeder =

American smoking cessation strategist

Steven A. Schroeder is Distinguished Professor of Health and Health Care at the University of California, San Francisco (UCSF), where he also heads the Smoking Cessation Leadership Center. He served as the president and CEO of the Robert Wood Johnson Foundation from 1990 to 2002. Schroeder is known for his work in promoting smoking cessation strategies.

== Early life and education ==
Steven A. Schroeder was born in Staten Island, NY. He graduated from Stanford University in 1960 and received an M.D. from Harvard Medical School in 1964.

== Honors ==
Schroeder's honors include 6 honorary doctoral degrees, the Lienhard Award from the National Academy of Medicine, and the Rogers Award from the American Association of American Medical Colleges. The American Legacy Foundation (now known as Truth Institute) named its National Institute for Tobacco Policy Studies in his honor in 2006, and the Leapfrog Group and the organization Costs of Care in 2018 inaugurated the Schroeder Award for Outstanding Health Care CEO. He gave the 2007 Shattuck Lecture for the Massachusetts Medical Society and the New England Journal of Medicine.

== Memberships and societies ==
Schroeder is a member of the American Academy of Arts and Sciences, American Association of Physicians, American College of Physicians, American Public Health Association, the National Academy of Medicine, and the Society of General Internal Medicine, as well as other organizations.

== Special national committees and offices ==
Schroeder was president of the Society for General Internal Medicine and the Harvard Medical Alumni Association in 2003–2006. He has been a part of many academic review boards, including those at NYU, Penn, U. Vermont, U Wisconsin, UC Berkeley, and UCSF.

== Journal editorial boards and directorships ==
Schroeder was a member of the editorial board of the New England Journal of Medicine from 1994 to 2013. His directorships include the vice chair (2001–2003) and chair (2003–2005) of the American Legacy Foundation (now Truth Initiative), Board of Overseers of Harvard College from 2000 to 2006, The James Irvine Foundation from 2004 to 2015, Mathematica Policy Research from 2011 onward, and the Marin Community Foundation.

== Robert Wood Johnson Foundation ==
Schroeder was president and CEO of the Robert Wood Johnson Foundation from 1990 to 2002.

== Smoking Cessation Leadership Center ==
Schroeder returned to UCSF in 2003, serving as Distinguished Professor of Health and Health Care in the Department of Medicine and as head of the Smoking Cessation Leadership Center (SCLC).

== Publications ==
- Steven A. Schroeder, Brian Clark, Christine Cheng, Catherine Saucedo (December 2017). "Helping Smokers Quit: New Partners and New Strategies from the University of California, San Francisco Smoking Cessation Leadership Center". J Psychoactive Drugs. 50 (1): 3–11. doi:10.1080/02791072.2017.1412546. PMID 29279040. S2CID 4485687.
- Steven A. Schroeder, Kenneth E. Warner (November 2017). "FDA's Innovative Plan to Address the Enormous Toll of Smoking. Viewpoint". The Journal of the American Medical Association. 318 (18): 1755–1756. doi:10.1001/jama.2017.14336. PMID 28885641.
- Steven A. Schroeder, Lekshmi Santhosh; et al. (May 2014). "From the Sidelines to the Frontline: How the Substance Abuse and Mental Health Services Administration Embraced Smoking Cessation". American Journal of Public Health. 104 (5): 796–802. doi:10.2105/AJPH.2013.301852. PMC 3987593. PMID 24625143.
- Troyen A. Brennan, Steven A. Schroeder (March 2014). "Ending Sales of Tobacco Products in Pharmacies. Viewpoint". Journal of the American Medical Association. 311 (11): 1105–1106. doi:10.1001/jama.2014.686. PMID 24500655.
- Steven A. Schroeder (November 2012). "Does the Moral Arc of the Universe Really Bend Toward Justice?". Journal of General Internal Medicine. 27 (11): 1397–1399. doi:10.1007/s11606-012-2146-x. PMC 3475820. PMID 22782279.
- Steven A. Schroeder (April 2011). "Personal reflections on the high cost of American medical care: Many causes but few politically sustainable solutions". Archives of Internal Medicine. 171 (8): 722–727. doi:10.1001/archinternmed.2011.149. PMID 21518938.
- Steven A. Schroeder, Chad Morris (April 2010). "Confronting a Neglected Epidemic: Tobacco Cessation for Persons with Mental Illnesses and Substance Abuse Problems". Annual Review of Public Health. 31: 297–314. doi:10.1146/annurev.publhealth.012809.103701. PMID 20001818.
- Steven A. Schroeder (February 2009). "Clinical Crossroads: A 51-year-old Woman with Bipolar Disorder Who Wants to Quit Smoking". Journal of the American Medical Association. 301 (5): 522–531. doi:10.1001/jama.2008.982. PMID 19126801.
- Steven A. Schroeder (September 2007). "We can do better: Improving the health of the American people". New England Journal of Medicine. 357 (12): 1221–1228. doi:10.1056/NEJMsa073350. PMID 17881753.
- Steven A. Schroeder (July 2005). "What to Do with a Patient Who Smokes". Journal of the American Medical Association. 294 (4): 482–487. doi:10.1001/jama.294.4.482. PMID 16046655.
- Steve Isaacs, Steven A. Schroeder (September 2004). "Class – The Ignored Determinant of the Nation's Health". New England Journal of Medicine. 351 (11): 1137–1142. doi:10.1056/NEJMsb040329. PMID 15356313.
