= Exercise Alice =

2016 UK pandemic simulation exercise

Exercise Alice was a Middle East respiratory syndrome (MERS-CoV) pandemic modelling exercise conducted by United Kingdom government officials in February 2016. The details of the exercise was kept secret on grounds of national security until October 2021.

The one-day tabletop exercise was the idea of the chief medical officer, Sally Davies, who gave the opening briefing. Other participants included 15 officials from Public Health England, 14 officials from the Department of Health and Social Care and 10 from NHS England. Two representatives from the Cabinet Office and one from each of the devolved administrations of Wales and Scotland were also present.

It was one of a number of pandemic-planning exercises prior to the COVID-19 pandemic in the United Kingdom. Some of the key issues raised in the report became problems in the early weeks of the COVID-19 pandemic, including shortages of personal protective equipment, failure to impose pandemic-related travel restrictions from overseas, and failure to have a working contact tracing system.

A partly redacted copy of the report from the exercise was published in October 2021.

== See also ==
- Exercise Cygnus
