= Clade X =

2018 pandemic modelling exercise

Clade X: A Global Health Security Simulation was a pandemic modelling exercise led by Johns Hopkins University's Center for Health Security, which occurred on Tuesday, May 15, 2018, at the Mandarin Oriental Hotel in Washington, D.C. The exercise was named after a hypothetical novel virus, and simulated efforts to counter a fast-moving and deadly epidemic released on purpose by a terrorist group consisting of scientists and their rich backers wanting to reduce overpopulation. In the simulation, the hypothetical pandemic resulted in 900 million simulated deaths. The exercise was invitation-only and nearly 150 people attended.

== Participants ==
The exercise was co-hosted by the Program for Appropriate Technology in Health (PATH), the Global Health Council, and the Nuclear Threat Initiative (NTI). It was funded through a grant from Open Philanthropy.
