= Simulation exercise =

A simulation exercise (SimEx) or emergency preparedness exercise is a public health simulation of a hypothetical disaster used to test response capacity. It is similar to military exercises.

== Types ==
The World Health Organization categorises simulation exercises into four categories: tabletop exercise, drill, functional exercise, and full-scale exercise listed in increasing complexity (amount of preparation and resources required). The European Centre for Disease Prevention and Control considers an additional type: the orientation exercise which it places before tabletop exercise.. The discussion-based exercises (orientation and tabletop are recommended as a starting point before conducting operation-based exercises (the other three types).

== Format ==
During an exercise, injects are provided. These are updates to the scenario in the form of emails, news articles, telephone calls and so on. The master scenario events list contains an overview of which injects are used when. The exercise is followed up by a debrief, including a "hot" debrief immediately after the exercise.

== Scenarios ==
=== Disease outbreaks ===
NSW Health hosted an influenza pandemic exercise called XFG in 2008. The World Health Organization hosted an exercise in 2025 called Polaris. The fictional disease being tested was "mammothpox" The outbreak started with a pathogen from permafrost. The same year, UK Health Security Agency held an exercise called Pegasus. The fictional disease in this exercise was "EV-D68".

Name	Year	Facilitator	Disease
Exercise Cygnus	2016	UK Government	influenza
Exercise Alice	2016	UK Government	Middle East respiratory syndrome
Exercise Clade X	2018	Johns Hopkins Center for Health Security	disease X
Crimson Contagion	2019	US Department of Health and Human Services	influenza

=== Mass casualty events ===
In 2017 an exercise called Elsa considered a major incident leading to many casualties. The same year, an exercise named Socrates considered a mass casualty event.

=== Natural disasters ===
A 2011 simulation imagined the 365 Crete earthquake happening again. In 2012 an exercise simulating destruction of the Isthmus of Corinth as a result of an earthquake was held.

== See also ==
- Emergency management
- Emergency operations center
