= Global Health Security Index =

Preparedness rating

- Abbreviation: GHSI
- Formation: 2019
- Purpose: assessing and benchmarking of health security and related capabilities across 195 countries
- Parent organization: Nuclear Threat Initiative, Johns Hopkins Center for Health Security, Economist Intelligence Unit
- Website: www.ghsindex.org

The Global Health Security Index is an assessment of global health security capabilities in 195 countries prepared by the Johns Hopkins Center for Health Security, the Nuclear Threat Initiative (NTI) and the Economist Intelligence Unit (EIU).

== History ==
The index was first published in 2019 and said, among other things, that "no country is fully prepared for epidemics or pandemics, and every country has important gaps to address". The countries in the category "most prepared" were, in overall score order, the United States, the United Kingdom, the Netherlands, Australia, Canada, Thailand, Sweden, Denmark, South Korea, Finland, France, Slovenia, and Switzerland. The United States was ranked first with an index value of 83.5 out of 100. The largest number of countries in the category "least prepared" was in Western and Central Africa.

The GHS index came to prominence during the 2020 outbreak of the COVID-19 pandemic. The map was used by President Donald Trump as part of his argument that the United States was the best prepared country in the world for a pandemic; one of the consultants who worked on the project said that while the US does rank at the top for the index, there were areas for improvement. A March 2020 article in The Lancet attacked the report, saying that countries which were ranked the most prepared, such as the United States and the United Kingdom, fared worse amid the pandemic than countries in Asia and Africa which ranked lower. In response to the attention that it was receiving, the index published an article in April 2020 in the wake of the pandemic which said that the position of the United States on the GHS Index Score did not reflect its preparedness to respond to potentially catastrophic infectious disease outbreaks.

...its score and rank do not indicate that the country is adequately prepared to respond to potentially catastrophic infectious disease outbreaks. Significant preparedness gaps remain, and some of those are playing out in the current crisis. The United States' response to the COVID-19 outbreak to date shows that capacity alone is insufficient if that capacity isn't fully leveraged. Strong health systems must be in place to serve all populations, and effective political leadership that instills confidence in the government's response is crucial.

— The U.S. and COVID-19: Leading the World by GHS Index Score, not by Response (2020-04-27)

A July 2020 analysis of the index by doctors at Public Health England that was published in the British Medical Journal recommend avoiding using the scoring to determine priorities and compare countries with one another and said that they looked forward to a further refinement of the index process. Specifically, the doctors said that while the process was comprehensive, questions remained over the skew of indicators towards the priorities of high-income countries, the validity of some indicators, the scoring system and its weighting, and how the GHSI added value to existing assessments of global health security.

== Method ==
The report is based on a questionnaire of 140 questions, organized across 6 categories, 34 indicators, and 85 subindicators. The six categories are:

- Prevention: Prevention of the emergence or release of pathogens
- Detection and Reporting: Early detection and reporting for epidemics of potential international concern
- Rapid Response: Rapid response to and mitigation of the spread of an epidemic
- Health System: Sufficient and robust health system to treat the sick and protect health workers
- Compliance with International Norms: Commitments to improving national capacity, financing plans to address gaps, and adhering to global norms
- Risk Environment: Overall risk environment and country vulnerability to biological threats

The index relies entirely on open-source information. The researchers worked with an international advisory panel of 21 experts from 13 countries.

== Validation ==
Emerging research suggests that the country scores of the index reliably predict several important health-related outcome measures, including mortality from communicable diseases.

However, during the COVID-19 pandemic, the countries' rankings in the GHSI did not meaningfully predict how many people would die from COVID-19 in those countries, with some low-ranked countries seeing fewer deaths and some high-ranked countries seeing more deaths.

== Funding ==
The development of the index was funded by, among others, the Open Philanthropy Project, the Bill & Melinda Gates Foundation and the Robertson Foundation.
