= Crimson Contagion =

Simulation testing U.S. response to a severe influenza pandemic

Crimson Contagion was a joint exercise conducted from January to August 2019, in which numerous national, state and local, private and public organizations in the US participated, in order to test the capacity of the federal government and twelve states to respond to a severe pandemic of influenza originating in China.

The simulation, which was conducted by the Department of Health and Human Services in a series of exercises that ran from January to August 2019, involved a scenario in which a group of about 30 tourists returning from China spread a novel influenza A respiratory virus in the United States, beginning in Chicago. In less than two months the virus had spread from a single index case (a 52-year-old man returning to Chicago) to infect 110 million Americans; 7.7 million patients would require hospitalization, and 586,000 people would die from the novel virus. The 70-page report issued at the conclusion of the exercise outlined the government's limited capacity to respond to a pandemic. States experienced "multiple challenges" requesting resources from the federal government "due to a lack of standardized, well-understood, and properly executed resource request processes," the report said. Federal agencies lacked the funds, coordination, and capacities to implement an effective response to the virus.

== Scenario ==
Between January and August 2019, Health and Human Services (HHS), headed by Alex Azar, ran a simulation—code-named "Crimson Contagion". In this "Functional Exercise", participating organizations included National Security Council, United States Department of Health and Human Services, United States Department of Agriculture, United States Department of Commerce, United States Department of Defense, United States Department of Energy, United States Department of Homeland Security, United States Department of Housing and Urban Development, United States Department of Interior, United States Department of Justice, United States Department of Labor, United States Department of State, United States Department of Transportation, United States Department of Treasury, among other state and local organizations, public and private.

During the simulation, several tourists fall ill with a "respiratory virus [that] began in China . . . [and] quickly spread around the world by air travelers . . . [with] high fevers." The virus spreads quickly throughout the world with the first detection in the United States occurring in Chicago (the host city for the exercise). The simulated virus was dubbed "H7N9 Influenza". Crimson Contagion begins at a point 47 days after the first case is discovered in the United States. According to the results of the coordinating draft report, dated October 2019, the Crimson Contagion simulation registered 110 million infected Americans, 7.7 million hospitalizations, and 586,000 fatalities.

== Key findings ==
- Federal government lacks sufficient funding to respond to a severe influenza pandemic.
- Exercise participants lacked clarity on the roles of different federal agencies, and what information was important to pass on to federal partners.
- HHS had issues providing accurate and relevant information to hospitals and other public health organizations.
- Confusion between HHS, FEMA, and the Department of Homeland Security on which federal agency would take the lead in the crisis.
- The United States lacks the production capacity to meet the demands for protective equipment and medical devices such as masks and ventilators imposed by a pandemic.
- States were unable to efficiently request resources due to the lack of a standardized request process.

== State participants ==
- Arizona
- Colorado
- Connecticut
- Idaho
- Illinois
- Massachusetts
- Nebraska
- New Hampshire
- New Mexico
- New York
- Pennsylvania
- South Carolina
