= Local resilience forum =

UK civil contingencies organizations

A local resilience forum (LRF) is a multi-agency forum formed in a police area of the United Kingdom by key emergency responders and specific supporting agencies. It is a requirement of the Civil Contingencies Act 2004 for partners to engage with a Local Resilience Forum.

The purpose of an LRF is to allow responders to coordinate activity related to emergency preparedness across their geographic area and produce a community risk register. An LRF does not have a direct role in emergency response, but its members are standing members of Tactical and Strategic Coordinating Groups, that provide for a multi-agency approach to coordinate response and recovery efforts.

There are 42 LRFs within England and Wales, with the Greater London area forming an area-wide forum including the City of London. Each London Borough has its own Borough Resilience Forum to focus upon local activity. In Scotland, there is a similar system of Regional Resilience Partnerships and Local Resilience Partnerships; Northern Ireland has a number of Emergency Response Groups.

== Agencies ==
Each LRF includes representatives from the below agencies:

- Territorial Police Force
- British Transport Police
- Fire and Rescue Service(s)
- Ambulance Service(s)
- Environment Agency/Natural Resources Wales/Scottish Environment Protection Agency
- Local Authorities
- National Health Service bodies
- UKHSA/Public Health Scotland/Public Health Wales
- Utility Companies
- Transport Companies
- Telephony Companies
- Voluntary and Community Sector Organisations
- Ministry of Defence representatives
