= Alexis Madrigal =

American journalist

- Born: Mexico City, Mexico
- Education: Harvard University (BA)
- Children: 2

Alexis Madrigal (born 1982) is an American journalist, and the author of two books. He has co-hosted Forum, the daily public affairs program on California Public Radio for KQED in San Francisco since 2021.

Madrigal graduated from Harvard University in 2004.

== Career ==
In 2010, Madrigal began working for The Atlantic. In 2014, he was promoted to deputy editor of TheAtlantic.com. He joined Fusion later in the year as part of a "big-name hiring spree" for the new media channel, "one of the hot-shot journalists on which Fusion is pinning its hopes." In March 2020, he started the COVID Tracking Project, a collaborative effort to track the spread of COVID-19 within the US, with Robinson Meyer and a team of volunteers. He has also written for Wired.

Madrigal's first book, Powering the Dream: The History and Promise of Green Technology, was published in 2011. In 2014, he spoke at the Aspen Ideas Festival alongside Tony Fadell as a member of a panel discussing "A New and Promising Energy Future". In 2017, Madrigal produced and hosted an 8-part audio documentary about containerization, titled Containers, with a special focus on the Port of Oakland. That subject is a core issue explored in his second book, The Pacific Circuit, which was published in 2025.

In 2024, Madrigal served as a judge for that year's American Mosaic Journalism Prize.

== Personal life ==
Madrigal is married and has two children.

== Books ==
- Madrigal, Alexis (2011). Powering the Dream: The History and Promise of Green Technology. Cambridge, Massachusetts: Da Capo Press. ISBN 9780306820991.
- Madrigal, Alexis (2026). The Pacific Circuit: A Globalized Account of the Battle for the Soul of an American City. Farrar, Straus and Giroux. ISBN 9780374159405.
