= COVID Tracking Project =

Collaborative online project aimed at tracking COVID-19 in the United States

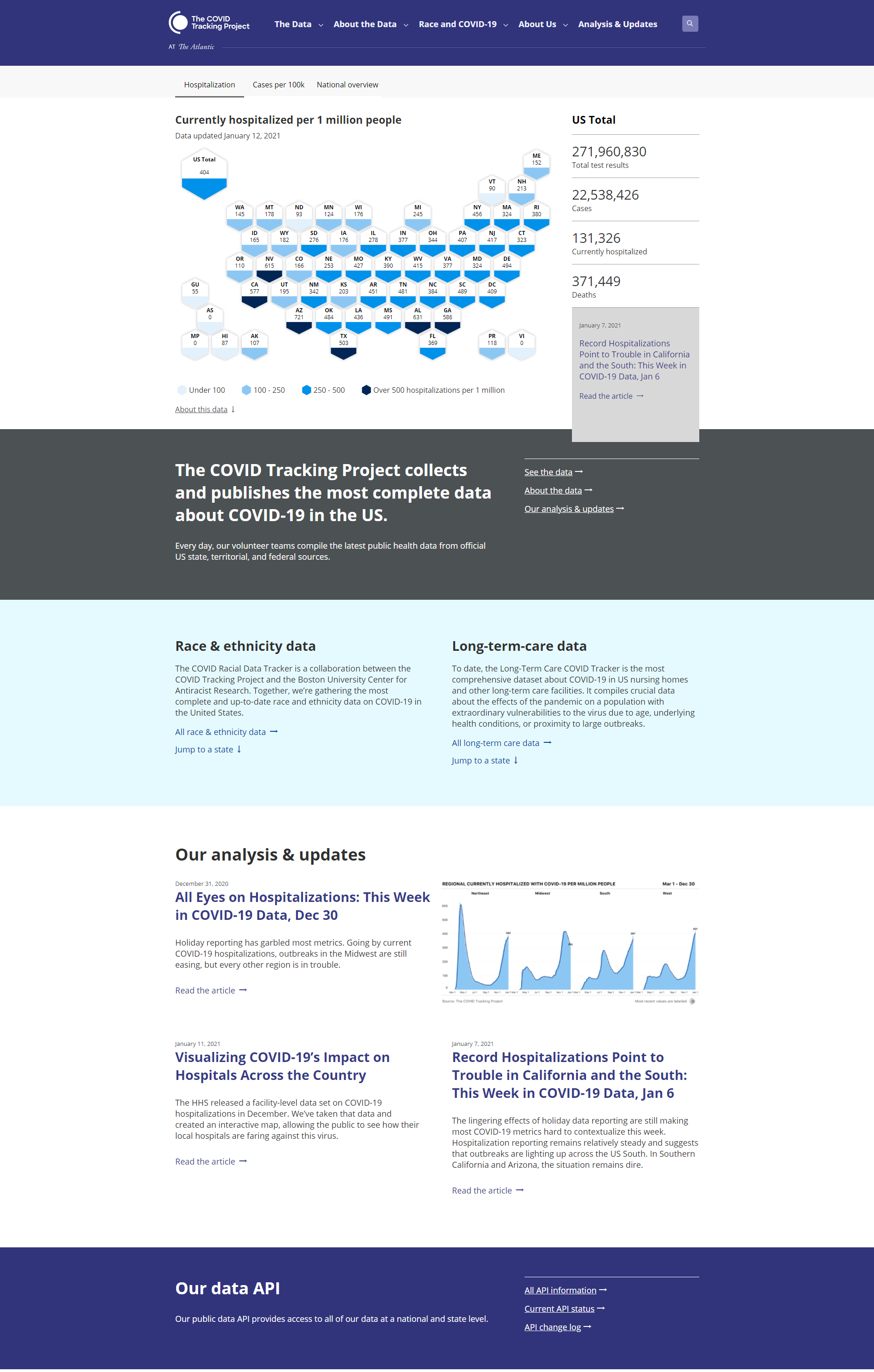
- Website type: Collaborative volunteer-run effort
- Creator: Alexis Madrigal
- Editor: Erin Kissane
- Key people: Robinson Meyer, Jeff Hammerbacher
- Website: covidtracking.com
- Launched: March 7, 2020; 6 years ago
- Current status: Inactive
- Content license: Data and website content are published under a CC BY 4.0 license.

The COVID Tracking Project was a collaborative volunteer-run effort to track the ongoing COVID-19 pandemic in the United States. It maintained a daily-updated dataset of state-level information related to the outbreak, including counts of the number of cases, tests, hospitalizations, and deaths, the racial and ethnic demographic breakdowns of cases and deaths, and cases and deaths in long-term care facilities.

Data was updated by hand from state health department webpages, press conferences, and outreach to state health officials. The project reported data from all states, the District of Columbia, and five US territories.

== History ==
In early March 2020, two journalists, Robinson Meyer and Alexis Madrigal, started constructing a COVID-19 tracking spreadsheet for their investigation in The Atlantic, after not finding a unified official source for testing data in the United States. Around the same time, data scientist Jeff Hammerbacher was independently working on a similar tracking spreadsheet, and the COVID Tracking Project was formed when these two projects merged on March 7, 2020, and the public was invited to contribute. Madrigal leads the project, and Erin Kissane joined as its managing editor; Hammerbacher remains an advisor and volunteer.

The project eventually grew to about 30 paid staffers and 250-300 active volunteers. Data continued to be entered using a spreadsheet, with an API developed for easier public sharing. It expanded the range of data points it was gathering as they were reported by a majority of states.

In May 2020, the CDC released their first dashboard with state-by-state breakdowns of cases and tests. The project published a comparison of the data compiled by the CDC with the data reported by the states.

On February 1, 2021, the organization announced that it would cease its data compilation activities and release its final daily update on March 7, 2021, citing the improvement of government COVID-19 data. On July 29, 2021, the University of California, San Francisco and The Atlantic announced that the COVID Tracking Project's archives would become part of the university library's permanent collection.

== Impact ==
The COVID Tracking Project's data and analysis became a definitive source of COVID-19 data for the United States. The data was used in over 80,000 news reports and 1,000 academic articles. Many federal agencies, including the Centers for Disease Control and Prevention, have cited data from the COVID Tracking Project, as have both the Trump administration and the Biden administration. In June 2020, the CDC released a report stating that The COVID Tracking Project's race and ethnicity data may be more complete than the agency's dataset. The Advisory Committee on Immunization Practices used the project's long-term care data to inform its phased vaccine allocation recommendations.

The COVID Tracking Project received multiple awards for its work, including a Sigma Delta Chi Award for Specialized Journalism Site, a Sigma Award for Data Journalism, and a New York University American Journalism Online Award for Best Data Visualization.
