= COVID-19 pandemic in the United States =

- COVID-19 cases per 100,000 people by state, as of July 11, 2022
- Disease: COVID-19
- Pathogen: SARS-CoV-2
- Location: United States
- First outbreak: Wuhan, Hubei, China
- Arrival date: January 13, 2020 (6 years, 10 months and 2 days ago) Public health emergency: January 31, 2020 – May 11, 2023 (3 years, 3 months, 1 week and 4 days)
- Confirmed cases: 103,436,829
- Suspected cases: 146,585,169 (CDC estimate in September 2021) >313,686,000 (Over 94.2% of Americans, November 2022 serosurvey estimate)
- Recovered: 109,814,428
- Deaths: 1,240,149 (reported); 1,231,440 (CDC estimate); 1,200,000 (The Economist estimate on January 25, 2022)
- Fatality rate: 1.2%
- Vaccinations: 270,227,170 (79.1216%) (people with at least one dose); 230,637,340 (67.52983%) (fully vaccinated people)

Government website
- CDC

Weekly confirmed COVID-19 deaths

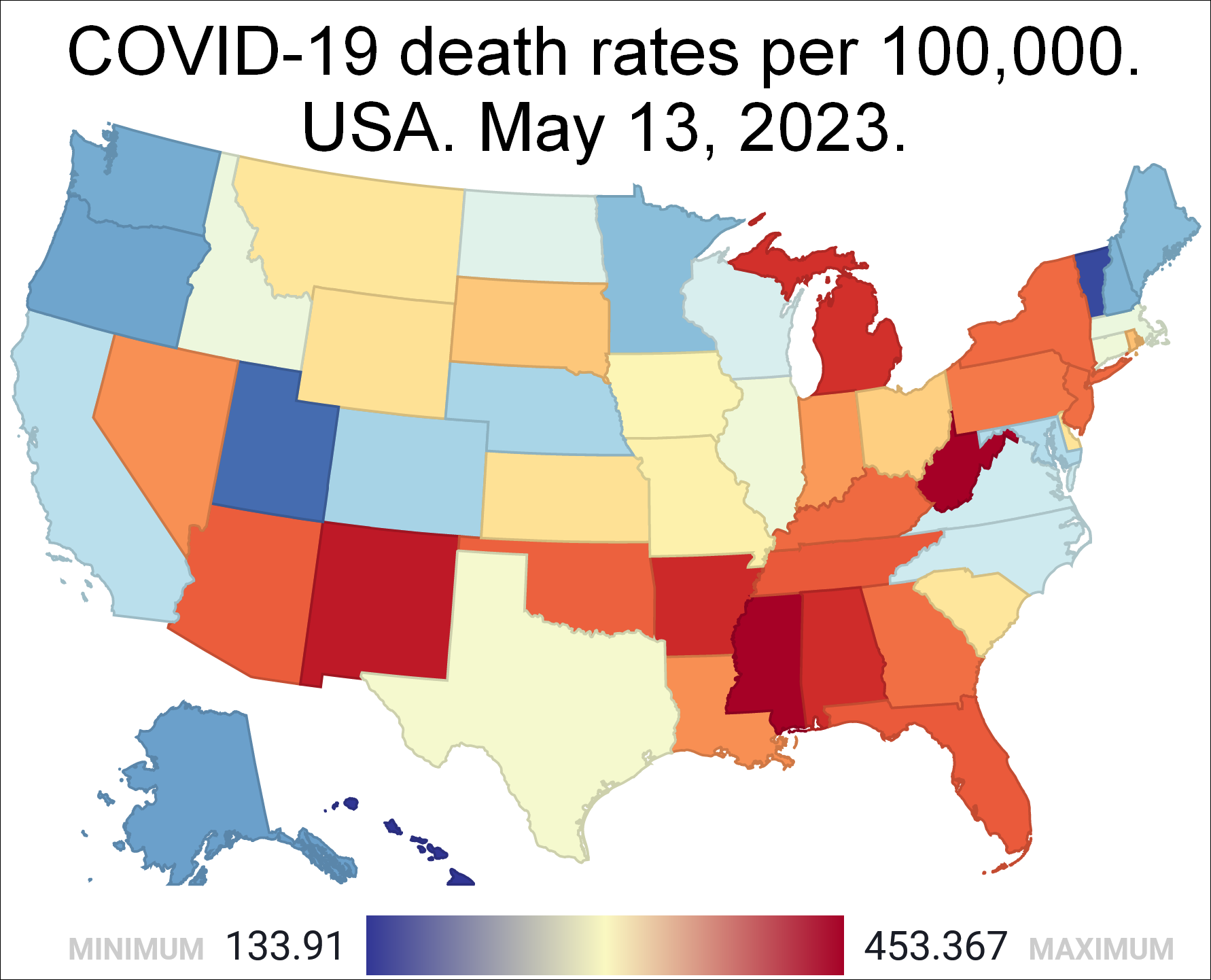
Map of cumulative COVID-19 death rates by U.S. state

On 31 December 2019, China announced the discovery of a cluster of pneumonia cases in Wuhan. The first American case of COVID-19 was reported on January 20, and Health and Human Services Secretary Alex Azar declared a public health emergency on January 31. Restrictions were placed on flights arriving from China, but the initial U.S. response to the COVID-19 pandemic was otherwise slow in terms of preparing the healthcare system, stopping other travel, and testing. (Note: A lack of mass testing obscured the extent of the outbreak.) The first known American deaths occurred in February and in late February President Donald Trump proposed allocating $2.5 billion to fight the outbreak. Instead, Congress approved $8.3 billion and Trump signed the Coronavirus Preparedness and Response Supplemental Appropriations Act, 2020 on March 6. Trump declared a national emergency on March 13. The government also purchased large quantities of medical equipment, invoking the Defense Production Act of 1950 to assist in those efforts. By mid-April, disaster declarations were made by all states and territories as they all had increasing cases. A second wave of infections began in June, following relaxed restrictions in several states, leading to daily cases surpassing 60,000. By mid-October, a third surge of cases began; there were over 200,000 new daily cases during parts of December 2020 and January 2021.

COVID-19 vaccines became available in December 2020, under emergency use, beginning the national vaccination program, with the first vaccine officially approved by the Food and Drug Administration (FDA) on August 23, 2021. Studies have shown them to be highly protective against severe illness, hospitalization, and death. In comparison with fully vaccinated people, the CDC found that those who were unvaccinated were from 5 to nearly 30 times more likely to become either infected or hospitalized. Nonetheless, there was some vaccine hesitancy for various reasons, although side effects were rare. There were also numerous reports that unvaccinated COVID-19 patients strained the capacity of hospitals throughout the country, forcing many to turn away patients with life-threatening diseases.

A fourth rise in infections began in March 2021 amidst the rise of the Alpha variant, a more easily transmissible variant first detected in the United Kingdom. That was followed by a rise of the Delta variant, an even more infectious mutation first detected in India, leading to increased efforts to ensure safety. The January 2022 emergence of the Omicron variant, which was first discovered in South Africa, led to record highs in hospitalizations and cases in early 2022, with as many as 1.5 million new infections reported in a single day. By the end of 2022, an estimated 77.5% of Americans had had COVID-19 at least once, according to the CDC.

State and local responses to the pandemic during the public health emergency included the requirement to wear a face mask in specified situations (mask mandates), prohibition and cancellation of large-scale gatherings (including festivals and sporting events), stay-at-home orders, and school closures. Disproportionate numbers of cases were observed among Black and Latino populations, as well as elevated levels of vaccine hesitancy, and there was a sharp increase in reported incidents of xenophobia and racism against Asian Americans. Clusters of infections and deaths occurred in many areas. (Note: Examples of areas in which clusters occurred include urban areas, nursing homes, long-term care facilities, group homes for the intellectually disabled, detention centers (including prisons), meatpacking plants, churches, and navy ships.) The COVID-19 pandemic also saw the emergence of misinformation and conspiracy theories, and highlighted weaknesses in the U.S. public health system.

In the United States, there have been 103,436,829 confirmed cases of COVID-19 with 1,240,149 confirmed deaths, the most of any country, and the 14th highest per capita worldwide as of March 2023. The COVID-19 pandemic ranks as the deadliest disaster in the country's history. It was the third-leading cause of death in the U.S. in 2020, behind heart disease and cancer. From 2019 to 2020, U.S. life expectancy dropped by three years for Hispanic and Latino Americans, 2.9 years for African Americans, and 1.2 years for White Americans. In 2021, U.S. deaths due to COVID-19 rose, and life expectancy fell.

== Timeline ==
=== December 2019 to April 2020 ===
In November 2019, COVID-19 infections had first broken out in Wuhan, China. China publicly reported the cluster on December 31, 2019. After China confirmed that the cluster of infections was caused by a novel infectious coronavirus on January 7, 2020, the CDC issued an official health advisory the following day. On January 20, the World Health Organization (WHO) and China both confirmed that human-to-human transmission had occurred. The CDC immediately activated its Emergency operations center (EOC) to respond to the outbreak in China. The first report of a COVID-19 case in the U.S. was publicly reported, though the All of Us study (released in 2021) showed that five states already had cases weeks earlier. After other cases were reported, on January 30, the WHO declared a Public health emergency of international concern (PHEIC) – its highest level of alarm – warning that "all countries should be prepared for containment". (Note: The editorial board for The Wall Street Journal suggested the world may have been "better prepared" had the PHEIC been declared a week sooner, when the virus had spread to other countries.) The same day, the CDC confirmed the first person-to-person case in the U.S. The next day, the country declared a public health emergency. Although by that date there were only seven known cases in the U.S., the HHS and CDC reported that there was a likelihood of further cases appearing in the country.

The Trump administration evacuated American nationals from Wuhan in January. On February 2, the U.S. enacted travel restrictions to and from China. On February 6, the earliest confirmed American death with COVID-19 (that of a 57-year-old woman) occurred in Santa Clara County, California. The CDC did not report its confirmation until April 21, by which point nine other COVID-19 deaths had occurred in Santa Clara County. The virus had been circulating undetected at least since early January and possibly as early as November.

On February 25, the CDC warned the American public for the first time to prepare for a local outbreak. The next day, New York City saw the sickening of its "patient zero", Manhattan attorney Lawrence Garbuz, then thought to be the first community-acquired case. Another case known as "patient zero" in Los Angeles was a man named Gregg Garfield, who spent 64 days in the Burbank Hospital, on a ventilator for 30 days, with a 1% chance to live. Contracting the virus from a ski trip, Garfield was able to return to the slopes, although with some fingers and toes amputated.

In February, Vice President Mike Pence took over for HHS Secretary Alex Azar as chair of the White House Coronavirus Task Force, with Trump saying, "We are very, very ready for this, for anything, whether it's going to be a breakout of larger proportions, or whether we're at that very low level". In late February Trump proposed allocating $2.5 billion to fight the outbreak, but Congress instead approved $8.3 billion with only Senator Rand Paul and Representatives Andy Biggs and Ken Buck voting against, and Trump signed the bill on March 6.

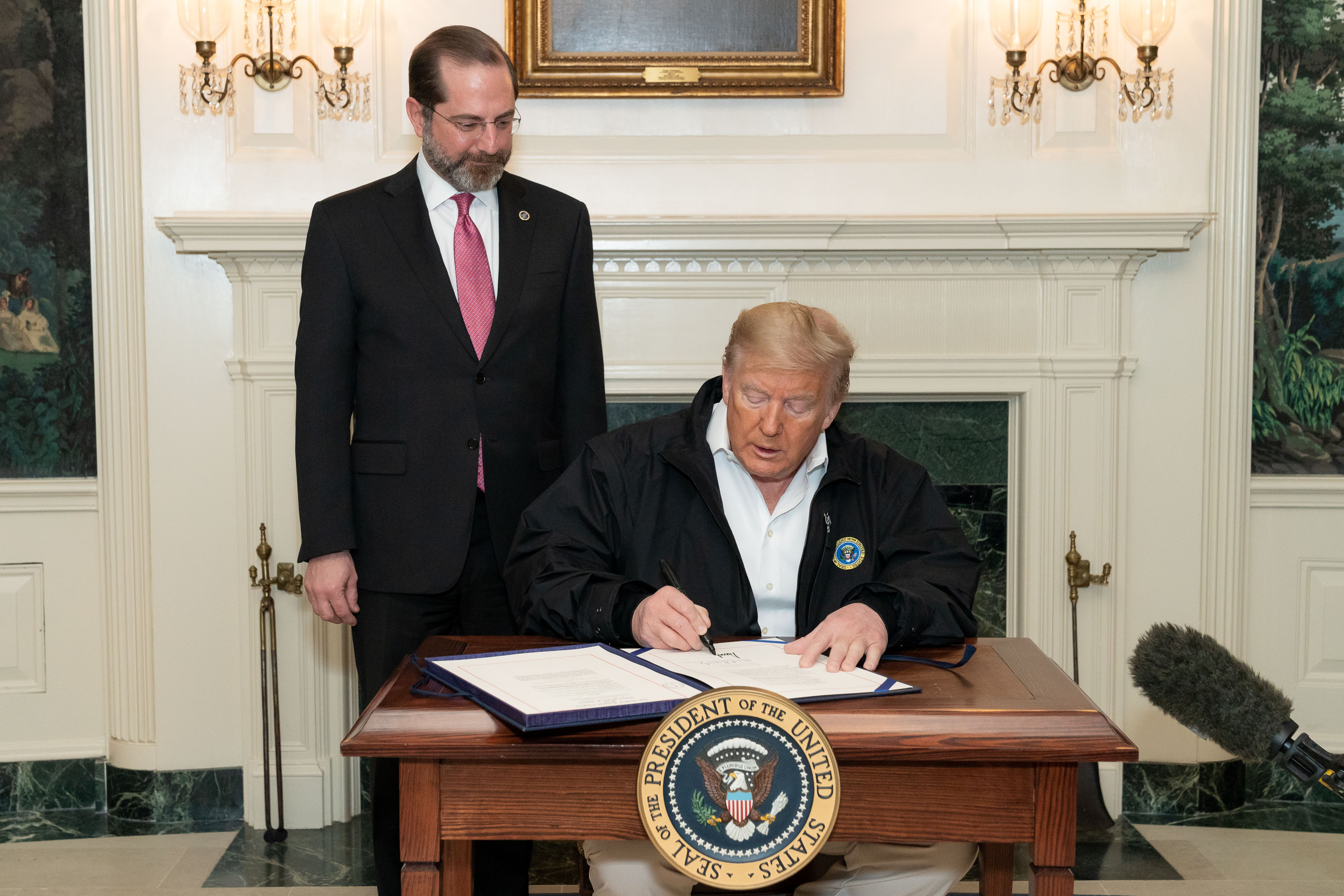
March 6: President Trump and Alex Azar at the signing of Coronavirus Preparedness and Response Supplemental Appropriations Act, 2020 into law

By March 11, the virus had spread to 110 countries, and the WHO began to refer to COVID-19 as a pandemic. The CDC had already warned that large numbers of people needing hospital care could overload the healthcare system, which would lead to otherwise preventable deaths. Director of the National Institute of Allergy and Infectious Diseases Anthony Fauci said the mortality from COVID-19 was ten times higher than the common flu. By March 12, diagnosed cases of COVID-19 in the U.S. exceeded a thousand. Trump declared a national emergency on March 13. On March 16, the White House advised against any gatherings of more than ten people. Three days later, the United States Department of State advised U.S. citizens to avoid all international travel.

By the middle of March, all fifty states were able to perform tests with a doctor's approval, either from the CDC or from commercial labs. However, the number of available test kits remained limited. As cases began spreading throughout the nation, federal and state agencies began taking urgent steps to prepare for a surge of hospital patients. Among the actions was establishing additional places for patients in case hospitals became overwhelmed.

Throughout March and early April, several state, city, and county governments imposed "stay at home" quarantines on their populations to stem the spread of the virus. By March 26, The New York Times data showed the United States to have the highest number of known cases of any country. By March 27, the country had reported over 100,000 cases. On April 2, at Trump's direction, the Centers for Medicare & Medicaid Services (CMS) and CDC ordered additional preventive guidelines to the long-term care facility industry. On April 11, the U.S. death toll became the highest in the world when the number of deaths reached 20,000, surpassing that of Italy. On April 19, the CMS added new regulations requiring nursing homes to inform residents, their families and representatives, of COVID-19 cases in their facilities. On April 28, the total number of confirmed cases across the country surpassed 1 million.

=== May to August 2020 ===
By May 27, less than four months after the pandemic reached the U.S., 100,000 Americans had died with COVID-19. State economic reopenings and lack of widespread mask orders resulted in a sharp rise in cases across most of the continental U.S. outside of the Northeast. A study conducted in May indicated that the true number of COVID-19 cases in the United States was much higher than the number of confirmed cases with some locations having 6–24 times higher infections, which was further confirmed by a later population-wide serosurvey.

On July 6, the United States Department of State announced the country's withdrawal from WHO effective July 6, 2021. On July 10, the CDC adopted the Infection Fatality Ratio (IFR), "the number of individuals who die of the disease among all infected individuals (symptomatic and asymptomatic)", as a new metric for disease severity. In July, US PIRG and 150 health professionals sent a letter asking the federal government to "shut it down now, and start over". In July and early August, requests multiplied, with a number of experts asking for lockdowns of "six to eight weeks" that they believed would restore the country by October 1, in time to reopen schools and have an in-person election.

One of many events in the news during this period was the 80th Sturgis Motorcycle Rally in Sturgis, South Dakota, with over 400,000 attendees, and from there, at least 300 people in more than 20 states were infected. The CDC followed up with a report on the associated 51 confirmed primary event-associated cases, 21 secondary cases, and five tertiary cases in the neighboring state of Minnesota, where one attendee died of COVID-19. The U.S. passed five million COVID-19 cases by August 8.

=== September to December 2020 ===
On September 22, the U.S. passed 200,000 deaths, according to data from Johns Hopkins University. In early October, an unprecedented series of high-profile U.S. political figures and staffers announced they had tested positive for COVID-19. On October 2, Trump announced on Twitter that both he and the First Lady had tested positive for COVID-19 and would immediately quarantine. Trump was given an experimental Regeneron product with two monoclonal antibodies (Note: In a news release, Sean Conley, physician to President Trump, incorrectly identified Regeneron's monoclonal antibody product as polyclonal.) and taken to Walter Reed National Military Medical Center, where he was given remdesivir and dexamethasone.

USA Today studied the aftermath of presidential election campaigning, recognizing that causation was impossible to determine. Among their findings, cases increased 35 percent compared to 14 percent for the state after a Trump rally in Beltrami County, Minnesota. One case was traced to a Joe Biden rally in Duluth, Minnesota.

On November 9, President-elect Biden's transition team announced his COVID-19 Advisory Board. On the same day, the total number of cases had surpassed ten million while the total had risen by over a million in the ten days prior, averaging 102,300 new cases per day. Pfizer also announced that its COVID-19 vaccine may be up to ninety percent effective. In November, the Trump administration reached an agreement with a number of retail outlets, including pharmacies and supermarkets, to make the COVID-19 vaccine free once available.

In spite of recommendations by the government not to travel, more than 2 million people flew on airlines during the Thanksgiving period. On December 8, the U.S. passed 15 million cases, with about one out of every 22 Americans having tested positive since the pandemic began. On December 14, the U.S. passed 300,000 deaths, representing an average of more than 961 deaths per day since the first known death on February 6. More than 50,000 deaths were reported in the past month, with an average of 2,403 daily deaths occurring in the past week.

On December 24, following concerns over a probably more easily transmissible new SARS-CoV-2 variant from the United Kingdom, later called Alpha, the CDC announced testing requirements for American passengers traveling from the UK, to be administered within 72 hours, starting on December 28. On December 29, the U.S. reported the first case of this variant in Colorado. The patient had no travel history, leading the CDC to say, "Given the small fraction of US infections that have been sequenced, the variant could already be in the United States without having been detected".

=== January to April 2021 ===
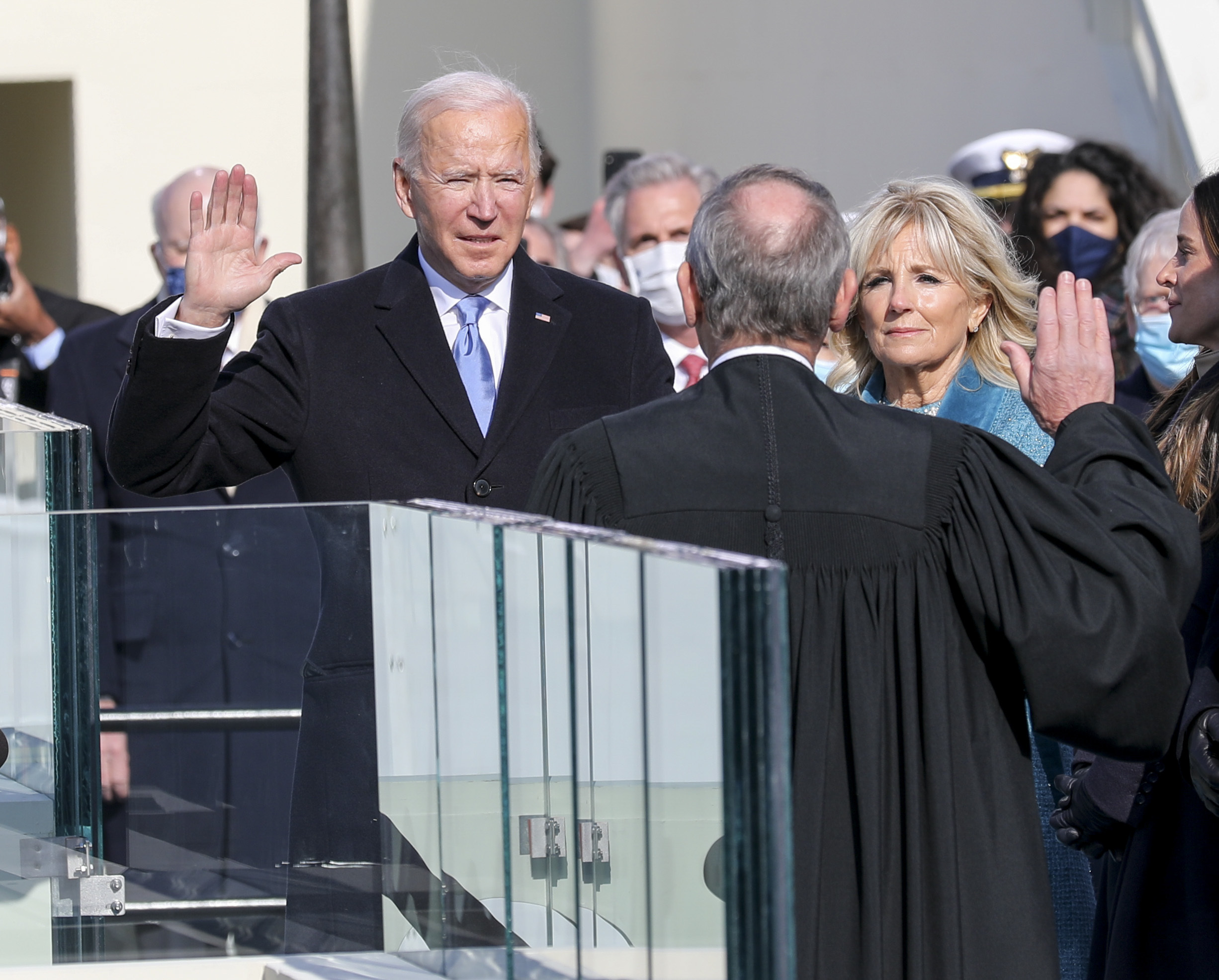
On January 20, Biden entered office amid the COVID-19 pandemic, an economic crisis, and increased political polarization

On January 1, 2021, the U.S. passed 20 million cases, representing an increase of more than a million over the past week and 10 million in less than two months. On January 6, the CDC announced that it had found at least 52 confirmed cases of the Alpha variant, and it also stressed that there could already be more cases in the country. In the following days, more cases of the variant were reported in other states, leading former CDC director Tom Frieden to express his concerns that the U.S. would soon face "close to a worst-case scenario". It was believed the variant had been present in the U.S. since October.

On January 19, the U.S. passed 400,000 deaths, just five weeks after the country passed 300,000 deaths. On January 22, the U.S. passed 25 million cases, with one of every 13 Americans testing positive for COVID-19. On January 29, a nationwide requirement for use of face masks on public transit and other forms of public transportation was issued by the CDC and the federal Transportation Security Administration, to go into effect on February 1. (Subsequently, extended, the federal mask mandate for public transportation remains in effect in April 2022.)

On February 22, the U.S. passed 500,000 deaths, just five weeks after the country passed 400,000 deaths. By March 5, more than 2,750 cases of COVID-19 variants were detected in 47 states; Washington, D.C.; and Puerto Rico. In the first prime time address of his presidency, on March 11, Biden announced his plan to push states to make vaccines available to all adults by May 1, with the aim of making small gatherings possible by July 4. On March 24, the U.S. passed 30 million cases, just as a number of states began to expand the eligibility age for COVID-19 vaccines. Experts began warning against public relaxation of COVID-19 mitigation measures as vaccines continue to be administered, with CDC director Rochelle Walensky, warning of a new rise in cases.

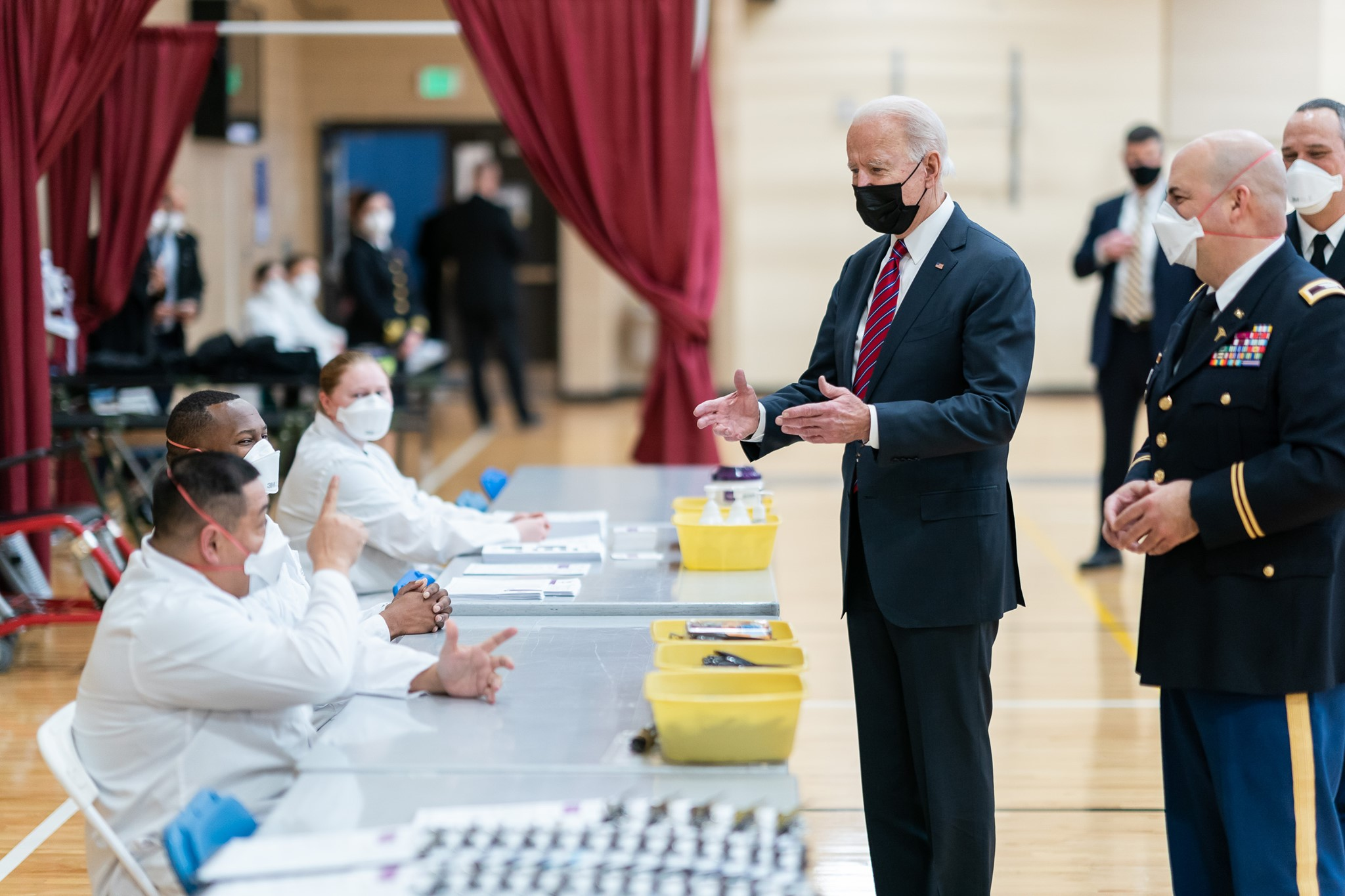
President Joe Biden visits a COVID-19 vaccination site at Walter Reed Medical Center

By April 7, the Alpha variant had become the dominant COVID-19 strain in the U.S. On April 12, the U.S. reported its first cases of a new "double mutant" SARS-CoV-2 variant from India, later called Delta, in California. By April 25, the country's seven-day average of new infections was reported to be decreasing, but concerns were raised about drops in vaccine demand in certain parts of the U.S., which were attributed to vaccine hesitancy. On April 29, the CDC estimated that roughly 35% of the U.S. population had been infected with the virus as of March 2021, about four times higher than the official reported numbers.

=== May to August 2021 ===
On May 4, Biden announced a new goal of having 70 percent of all adults in the U.S. receive at least one COVID-19 vaccine shot by July 4, along with steps to vaccinate teenagers and more inaccessible populations. The country ultimately did not reach that goal, with only 67 percent of the overall adult population having done so by July 4. On May 6, a study by the Institute for Health Metrics and Evaluation estimated that the true COVID-19 death toll in the U.S. was more than 900,000 people. On May 9, Fauci confirmed that the U.S. death toll was likely undercounted.

On May 13, the CDC changed its guidance and said that fully vaccinated individuals do not need to wear masks in most situations. Some states ended their mask mandates shortly after, while others maintained the mandate. The CDC was criticized for the confusion resulting from the announcement, as it did not remove existing state and local mandates. The guidance also did not remove the federal mask mandate on public transportation. On June 15, the U.S. passed 600,000 deaths, though the number of daily deaths had decreased due to vaccination efforts.

By June, COVID-19 cases rose again, especially in Arkansas, Nevada, Missouri, and Wyoming. The rising numbers were believed to be attributable to the Delta variant. By July 7, the Delta variant had surpassed the Alpha variant to become the dominant COVID-19 strain in the U.S., according to CDC data. By August the Delta variant accounted for 99 percent of all cases and was found to double the risk of hospitalization for those not yet vaccinated.

On August 1, the U.S. passed 35 million cases. By early to mid-August, hospitals in some states with low vaccination rates began to exceed capacity. One-quarter of the U.S. population resides in eight states—Alabama, Arkansas, Florida, Georgia, Louisiana, Mississippi, Nevada, and Texas—but, by mid-August, these states together had a half of COVID-19 hospitalizations in the nation. By the end of the month, the ICUs of five of those—Alabama, Arkansas, Florida, Georgia, and Texas—were over 90% full.

=== September to November 2021 ===
On September 8, the U.S. passed 40 million cases. By September 15, one in every 500 Americans had died from COVID-19. By September 20, COVID-19 had killed over 675,000 Americans, the estimated number of American deaths from the Spanish flu in 1918. As a result, COVID-19 became the deadliest respiratory pandemic in recent American history. The Associated Press called the new numbers a "colossal tragedy" because, despite a century of advances in science, the country failed to take full advantage of vaccines. On October 1, the U.S. passed 700,000 deaths. On October 18, the U.S. passed 45 million cases. On November 26, Biden announced U.S. restrictions on travel from South Africa and seven other African countries due to concerns over a new variant from the area, called Omicron.

=== December 2021 to March 2022 ===
At the beginning of January 2022, the number of cases per day exceeded 1 million. As of February 1, fatality rates were 63% higher in the U.S. than other large wealthy countries, due in part to far lower vaccination rates compared to those countries. On March 9, the Biden administration advised Congress of a lack of funding for testing, therapeutics and vaccines, but Republicans continued to block new spending on the pandemic so Democrats removed an emergency aid package from a proposed spending bill. On March 20, Fauci warned of an "uptick" in cases like Europe had seen recently, stating the U.S. should "be prepared for the possibility that we might get another variant".

=== April to June 2022 ===
In April 2022, CNN reported that COVID-19 numbers reached pandemic lows across the US, resulting in many testing sites closing their doors. With testing sites seeing as low as single digits per day, Director of Public Health Services Division of the Haywood County Health and Human Services Agency in North Carolina Sarah Henderson suggested that she expected most counties to see closures soon, if they had not already. "We were seeing an excess of 100 patients at our testing site in the first few days [of January], which doesn't sound like a lot, but our community is very small", Henderson said. "The last couple of weeks, we have seen single digits every day. I certainly won't speak for other counties, but I think we're probably heading in that direction where if they're not closing down, they're decreasing hours and staff".

On April 18, the federal transportation mask mandate, which had been extended to May 3 by the Biden administration on the advice of the CDC, was ended nationwide by U.S. District Judge Kathryn Kimball Mizelle, a Trump-appointed federal judge in Florida. The Justice Department challenged the ruling several days later, yet masks remained optional on airplanes, buses, and subway systems, except when required by local mandates.

The first annual National COVID Week of Remembrance & Action was held from April 24–30, with mayors and other political officials declaring the week of remembrance in their respective jurisdictions as part of a national movement led by a collection of COVID advocacy groups. According to data compiled by NBC News, the U.S. death toll reached 1 million on May 4, the largest-recorded death toll in any single country, followed by Brazil, with about 660,000 deaths. The White House confirmed the 1 million mark with a presidential proclamation on May 12, ordering flags to be flown at half-staff at all federal facilities through sundown on May 16.

In June, the United States concluded the approval process for the vaccination of children under five years of age, with the first vaccines expected to be administered on June 21. On June 12, the U.S. dropped COVID testing requirements for inbound international air travelers, while vaccination requirements largely remained in place for inbound travelers using any mode of cross-border transportation.

=== July to September 2022 ===
The number of cases for the months of January through June was about 2.4 times the number for the same period in 2021, and the number of COVID-attributed deaths likewise averaged 0.74 times the number in 2021. Nonetheless, as of July 14, only 21 states had active COVID-19 emergency orders in place, and no state-level mask requirements remained in force.

The number of cases for July and August was 3,672,358 and 3,154,320, respectively, with 11,963 and 15,943 COVID-attributed deaths, respectively. The totals for these two months reflect about 1.6 times the number of cases and 0.81 times the number of deaths from the same months in 2021.

On September 18, in an appearance on 60 Minutes, Biden declared his belief that the COVID-19 pandemic was "over" in the United States. This assessment met some debate in the medical community: at the time, the United States had roughly 400 deaths from the disease per day, and when extrapolated to 150,000 per year would be three times the fatality rate of a bad flu season.

The number of cases for the months of July through September was about 0.86 times the number for the same period in 2021, and the number of COVID-attributed deaths likewise averaged 0.42 times the number for the same period in 2021.

=== October to December 2022 ===
In October, new variants BQ.1 and BQ.1.1 from the dominant BA.5 appeared to be spreading quickly, but comprised only a small proportion of overall variants. Although variant XBB was of concern internationally, it was rare in the United States. Recommendations for receiving vaccination booster shots were mixed: while populations at risk of severe disease and death should stay up-to-date, healthy, middle-aged-and-younger populations were rarely at risk of severe illness, and most have adequate immunity. Although the newest bivalent boosters target the recent BA.4 and BA.5 variants and their risks were low, some experts recommended new strategies to develop vaccines with broader effectiveness.

In a survey of vaccination booster intake (after completing a primary series), about 15% reported receiving the updated booster. The rates varied racially with 19% among White, non-Hispanic people, about 11% among Hispanic people, and about 7% among non-Hispanic American Indians, Alaska Native people, Black people, and those of multiple races, leading to concerns of vaccination access inequity.

In the months leading up to November, deaths from COVID-19 substantially decreased, attributed to high levels of population immunity (through vaccination or prior infection), and improvements in early treatment for patients at risk for severe disease. The CDC recommended vaccinations, treatments for immunocompromised individuals and to reduce severity of the disease, and continuing to wear masks in public. Nonetheless, Fauci stated that the Biden administration felt that there was "enough community protection that we're not going to see a repeat of what we saw last year at this time", referring to the emergence of the Omicron variant.

A study of vaccine effectiveness found that U.S.-authorized bivalent mRNA boosters administered to those having already received 2 to 4 monovalent vaccinations provided significant additional protection against symptomatic SARS-CoV-2. Concerns of a surge in Beijing caused the Biden administration to require U.S. visitors from China, Hong Kong, and Macau to provide proof of COVID-19 negative test results. At the end of the year, the CDC reported that the COVID Omicron XBB.1.5 variant became much more prevalent and represented about 41% of new cases in the U.S. Scientists at Columbia University warned that the rise of subvariants could "result in a surge of breakthrough infections as well as re-infections".

=== January to March 2023 ===
On January 11, the Biden administration decided to renew the COVID-19 public health emergency amid a winter surge of cases related to highly transmissible Omicron subvariants. With relief measures such as automatic Medicaid re-enrollment being decoupled from the emergency declaration, some commentators believed this signaled the final extension of the emergency declaration.

Although some states had already ended emergency SNAP benefits enacted during the pandemic, the USDA announced that emergency allotments for the remaining 32 states, the District of Columbia, Guam, and the U.S. Virgin Islands would end after the February distribution. Leaders of some anti-hunger organizations believed that the end of the $95-per-month additional benefit would strain local food pantries and food banks. South Carolina, which ended emergency food grants after the January distribution, and the 17 other states which terminated pandemic food supplements prior to the federal end date were all states with Republican-controlled state legislatures.

On January 31, Biden announced the end to the COVID-19 emergency declarations by May 11. By February 23, eighteen states had already cut payments for more than 10 million people, and Congress had decided to end the program early, exchanging additional benefits for a new permanent program that provides extra money to low-income families to replace school meals during the summer.

=== April to June 2023 ===
On April 10, Biden signed into law a resolution terminating the national emergency, effective immediately. This national emergency was separate from the public health emergency, which remained in effect until May 11.

=== July to September 2023 ===
A late-summer wave of COVID-19 cases, as reflected by tests at pharmacies and healthcare settings, marked the first US surge of infections since the end of the public health emergency. Wastewater testing initially indicated that the uptick in cases was only a third the size of the previous summer's surge, yet data from Walgreens showed the first week of August having the largest number of positive cases since May 2021.

Hospitals across the United States reported a 24% rise in hospitalizations during the first two weeks of August and wastewater testing showed increased cases in the West and Northeast. With the pandemic legally declared over earlier in 2023, schools and workplaces responded to outbreaks differently, with many schools seeking to be more judicious about when to keep students home from school. The film studio Lionsgate, however, briefly reinstated a mask mandate following an outbreak, as did Morris Brown College, which also reinstated temperature checks and a restriction on large events for two weeks, at the beginning of the fall 2023 semester. As more schools launched their fall semesters in late August and early September, high positivity rates among students and staff led to temporary in-person learning suspensions across three school districts in Texas and Tennessee, driven by district-level decisions rather than state authorities.

With hospitalizations in excess of 20,000 for the first time since the end of the public health emergency, the federal government restarted the national free COVID test delivery program on September 25, enabling the delivery of four free COVID-19 tests per mailing address at a time when many insurance providers had begun to drop coverage of COVID tests. The program, entering its fifth round of distributions with the fall 2023 initiative, was suspended in May to preserve supplies yet Health Secretary Xavier Becerra stated that the stockpile had been replenished and that the program would continue through the holiday season, and beyond, if cases continued to rise. Some of the newly mailed tests would show expired dates on their packaging but would remain valid for testing since the FDA had recently extended the expiration dates of a variety of tests.

=== October to December 2023 ===
Upon entering the first winter season of the post-pandemic period, some health facilities in California, New York, Massachusetts, and Illinois began to reinstate mask mandates for staff and visitors, due to increased rates of infection amid what had become an annual winter milieu of COVID, flu, and RSV. New York City Health and Hospitals resumed its mandate shortly after Christmas, with the additional goal of minimizing staffing shortages throughout the healthcare system.

=== January to March 2024 ===
In January 2024, wastewater data showed that U.S. infections had reached their second-highest recorded level, surpassed only by the initial Omicron wave in January 2022.

Due to a 38% rise in COVID-related hospitalizations in December, rapidly rising RSV infections, and similarly trending flu cases, the city of Saint Louis reinstated a mask mandate for city employees which would have started on January 5. Missouri's Republican governor, a staunch opponent of mask mandates, pressured the city to cancel the mandate less than 24 hours after it had been issued, with the city also revising its previous data on RSV and flu infections.

Meanwhile, the New York City Fire Department instituted a more targeted municipal employee mandate on January 12, which required only firetruck and ambulance personnel to be masked, specifically while rendering pre-hospital patient care. This followed a renewed mask mandate which went into effect at all New York City Health + Hospitals on January 1.

On January 9, in a bid to avoid school and workplace disruptions amid the post-pandemic winter surge, California health officials shortened the recommended period of isolation to one day for infected individuals who exhibit only mild symptoms. On March 1, the CDC followed suit and shortened its recommended isolation period to one day after being fever-free without the aid of medications, which was the same recommendation provided for influenza and respiratory syncytial virus. The CDC still recommended enhanced precautions, such as wearing a mask and limiting close contact with others, for five days.

=== Second Trump Administration (2025) ===
In March 2025, under the second Trump administration, the U.S. National Institutes of Health (NIH) and the Centers for Disease Control and Prevention (CDC) initiated the termination of billions of dollars in funding allocated for COVID-19 research. The cuts affected a wide range of projects, including studies on vaccine development, long COVID, and pandemic preparedness. The decision raised concerns within the scientific community about the potential impact on ongoing research and the nation's readiness for future public health emergencies.

In April 2025, the Trump administration updated the federal government's main websites concerning COVID-19, including Covid.gov and Covidtests.gov, to emphasize the theory that the virus originated from a laboratory leak in Wuhan, China. This update replaced previous information regarding the virus, such as how to order free COVID tests, with material attacking mask mandates, social distancing measures, the World Health Organization, and prominent pandemic-era figures such as Anthony Fauci and Andrew Cuomo, in addition to promulgating the lab leak theory.

In May 2025, Health and Human Services Secretary Robert F. Kennedy Jr. announced that he had unilaterally removed the COVID-19 vaccine from the CDC's recommended immunization schedule for healthy children and pregnant women, a decision that bypassed the normal scientific review process. Kennedy later announced, in August 2025, that HHS would be terminating 22 mRNA vaccine development projects worth nearly $500 million through the Biomedical Advanced Research and Development Authority (BARDA), claiming the vaccine technology was "ineffective" and posed more risks than benefits for respiratory infections like COVID-19 and flu.

== Responses ==
On January 28, 2020, the CDC updated its China travel recommendations to level 3, its highest alert. On February 8, the WHO's director-general announced that a team of international experts had been assembled to travel to China and he hoped officials from the CDC would also be part of that mission. In January, Boeing announced a donation of 250,000 medical masks to help address China's supply shortages. On February 7, the State Department said it had facilitated the transportation of nearly eighteen tons of medical supplies to China, including masks, gowns, gauze, respirators, and other vital materials. On the same day, U.S. Secretary of State Pompeo announced a $100 million pledge to China and other countries to assist with their fights against the virus.

Contact tracing was a tool to control transmission rates during the reopening process. Some states like Texas and Arizona opted to proceed with reopening without adequate contact tracing programs in place. Health experts have expressed concerns about training and hiring enough personnel to reduce transmission. Privacy concerns have prevented measures such as those imposed in South Korea where authorities used cellphone tracking and credit card details to locate and test thousands of nightclub patrons when new cases began emerging. Funding for contact tracing was thought to be insufficient, and even better-funded states have faced challenges getting in touch with contacts. Congress allocated $631 million for state and local health surveillance programs, but the Johns Hopkins Center for Health Security estimated that $3.6 billion would be needed. The cost rose with the number of infections, and contact tracing was easier to implement when the infection count was lower. Health officials were also worried that low-income communities would fall further behind in contact tracing efforts which "may also be hobbled by long-standing distrust among minorities of public health officials". As of July 1, 2020, only four states were using contact tracing apps as part of their state-level strategies to control transmission. The apps document digital encounters between smartphones, automatically notifing the users if someone they had contact with had tested positive. Public health officials in California claimed that most of the functionality could be duplicated by using text, chat, email, and phone communications.

Remdesivir was indicated for use in adults and adolescents (aged twelve years and older with body weight at least 40 kilograms (88 lb)) for the treatment of COVID-19 requiring hospitalization. The FDA issued an emergency use authorization (EUA) for the combination of baricitinib with remdesivir, for the treatment of suspected or laboratory confirmed COVID-19 in hospitalized people two years of age or older requiring supplemental oxygen, invasive mechanical ventilation, or extracorporeal membrane oxygenation (ECMO). In early March, President Trump directed the FDA to test certain medications to discover if they had the potential to treat COVID-19 patients. Among those were chloroquine and hydroxychloroquine, which have been successfully used to treat malaria for over fifty years. A small test in France by researcher Didier Raoult had given positive results, although the study was criticized for design flaws, small sample size, and the fact that it was published before peer review. On March 28, the FDA issued an Emergency Use Authorization (EUA) which allowed certain hospitalized COVID-19 patients to be treated with hydroxychloroquine or chloroquine. On June 15, the FDA revoked the EUA for hydroxychloroquine and chloroquine as potential treatments for COVID-19, saying the available evidence showed "no benefit for decreasing the likelihood of death or speeding recovery". However, Trump continued to promote the use of hydroxychloroquine for COVID-19 through July.

From early 2020, more than 70 companies worldwide (with five or six operating primarily in the U.S.) began vaccine research. In preparation for large-scale production, Congress set aside more than $3.5 billion for this purpose as part of the CARES Act. On November 20, the Pfizer–BioNTech partnership submitted a request for emergency use authorization for its vaccine to the Food and Drug Administration (FDA), which was granted on December 11. On December 18, the FDA granted the Moderna vaccine emergency use authorization, which Moderna had requested on November 30. Starting on December 14, the first doses of COVID-19 vaccine were administered.

Polling showed a significant partisan divide regarding the outbreak. In February 2020, similar numbers of Democrats and Republicans believed COVID-19 was "a real threat": 70% and 72%, respectively. By mid-March 2020, 76% of Democrats viewed COVID-19 as "a real threat", while only 40% of Republicans agreed. In mid-March, various polls found Democrats were more likely than Republicans to believe "the worst was yet to come" (79–40%), to believe their lives would change in a major way due to the outbreak (56–26%), and to take certain precautions against the virus (83–53%). The CDC was the most trusted source of information about the outbreak (85%), followed by the WHO (77%), state and local government officials (70–71%), the news media (47%), and Trump (46%). A May 2020 poll concluded that 54% of people in the U.S. felt the federal government was doing a poor job in stopping the spread of COVID-19 in the country. 57% felt the federal government was not doing enough to address the limited availability of COVID-19 testing. 58% felt the federal government was not doing enough to prevent a second wave of COVID-19 cases later in 2020. In September 2020, the Pew Research Center found that the global image of the United States had suffered in many foreign nations. In some nations, the United States' favorability rating had reached a record low since Pew began collecting this data nearly twenty years earlier. Across thirteen different nations, a median of fifteen percent of respondents rated the U.S. response to the pandemic positively.

== Impacts ==
=== Economic ===
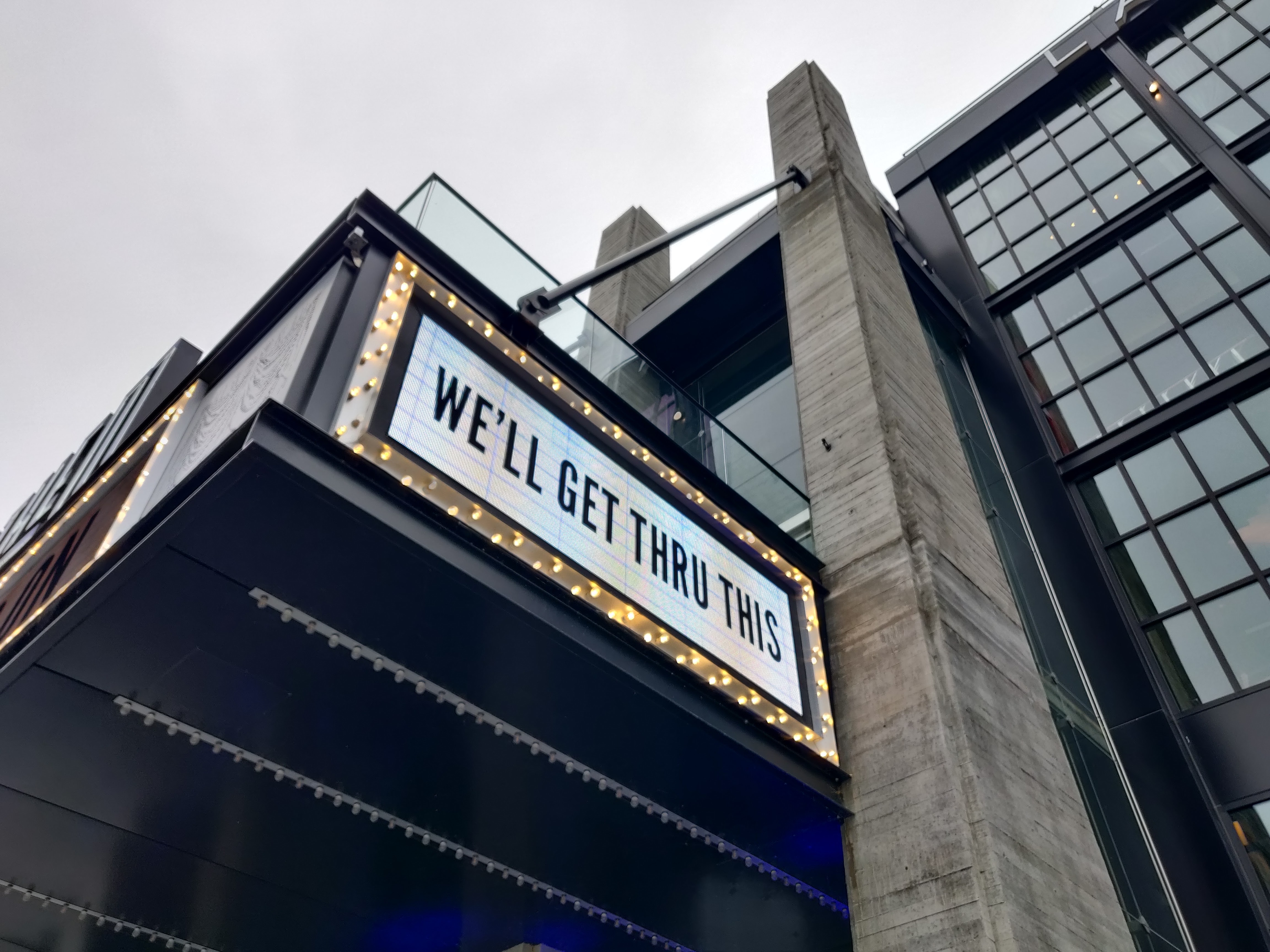
Marquee at a closed music venue in Washington, D.C.

The pandemic, along with the resultant stock market crash and other impacts, led a recession in the United States following the economic cycle peak in February 2020. The economy contracted 4.8 percent from January through March 2020, and the unemployment rate rose to 14.7 percent in April. The total healthcare costs of treating the epidemic could be anywhere from $34 billion to $251 billion according to analysis presented by The New York Times. A study by economists Austan Goolsbee and Chad Syverson indicated that most economic impact due to consumer behavior changes was prior to mandated lockdowns. During the second quarter of 2020, the U.S. economy suffered its largest drop on record, with GDP falling at an annualized rate of 32.9 percent. As of June 2020, the U.S. economy was over ten percent smaller than it was in December 2019.

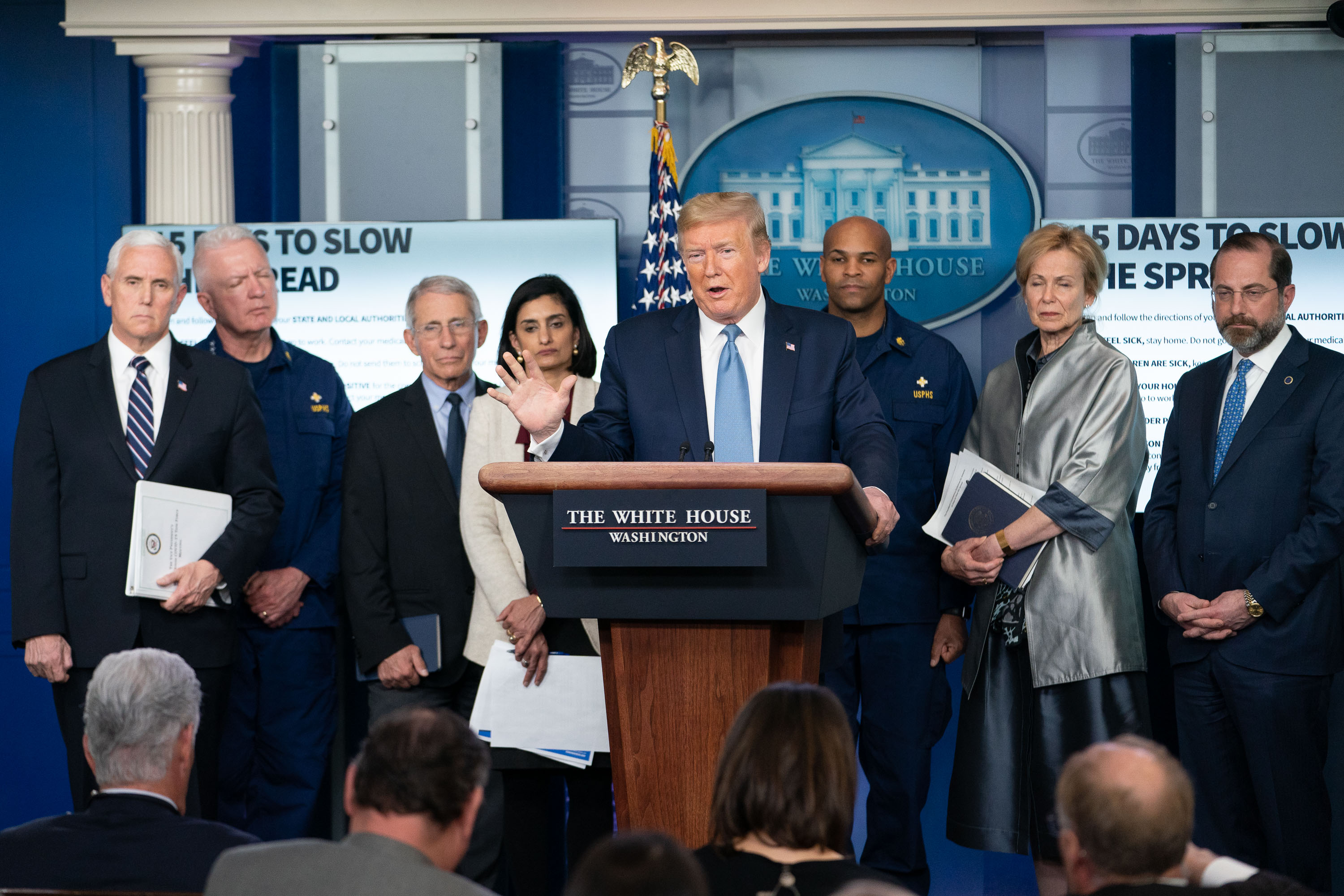
Trump and members of the White House Coronavirus Task Force brief the media on March 16, 2020. Anthony Fauci is seen as third from the left

In September, Bain & Company reported on the tumultuous changes in consumer behavior before and during the pandemic. Potentially permanently, they found acceleration towards e-commerce, online primary healthcare, livestreamed gym workouts, and moviegoing via subscription television. Concurrent searches for both low-cost and premium products, and a shift to safety over sustainability, occurred alongside rescinded bans and taxes on single-use plastics, and losses of three to seven years of gains in out-of-home foodservice. OpenTable estimated in May that 25 percent of American restaurants would close their doors permanently.

The economic impact and mass unemployment caused by the COVID-19 pandemic raised fears of a mass eviction crisis, with an analysis by the Aspen Institute indicating 30–40 million were at risk for eviction by the end of 2020. According to a report by Yelp, about sixty percent of U.S. businesses that have closed since the start of the pandemic would stay shut permanently.

The vast increase in the flow of federal funds to American citizens (via the CARES Act and related measures) resulted in a corresponding increase in benefits fraud, both from businesses and individuals. In the largest individual case, Feeding Our Future, dozens of individuals conspired to receive nearly $250 million in USDA child nutrition funds while failing to actually provide meals to children. Nationwide, as of 2025, more than 4200 Americans had been federally charged with pandemic fraud, leading to more than 2400 convictions and $2 billion in recovered funds and forfeitures.

Impact of the pandemic on various economic variables in 2020
Variable	Feb	Mar	Apr	May	June	July	Aug	Sep	Oct	Nov
Jobs, level (000s)	152,463	151,090	130,303	133,002	137,802	139,582	140,914	141,720	142,373	142,629
Jobs, monthly change (000s)	251	−1,373	−20,787	2,699	4,800	1,780	1,371	661	653	256
Unemployment rate %	3.5%	4.4%	14.7%	13.3%	11.1%	10.2%	8.4%	7.9%	6.9%	6.7%
Number unemployed (millions)	5.8	7.1	23.1	21.0	17.8	16.3	13.6	12.6	11.1	10.7
Employment to population ratio %, age 25–54	80.5%	79.6%	69.7%	71.4%	73.5%	73.8%	75.3%	75.0%	76.0%	76.0%
Inflation rate % (CPI-All)	2.3%	1.5%	0.4%	0.2%	0.7%	1.0%	TBD	TBD	TBD	TBD
Stock market S&P 500 (avg. level)	3,277	2,652	2,762	2,920	3,105	3,230	3,392	3,380	3,270	3,694
Debt held by public ($ trillion)	17.4	17.7	19.1	19.9	20.5	20.6	20.8	21.0	21.2	21.3

=== Social ===
Research suggests that, for Americans, the COVID pandemic increased social isolation, especially for those who lived alone and worked in jobs that could be performed remotely. Their isolation levels had not returned to pre-pandemic levels by 2024.

Though the raw share of socially isolated people living alone is greater than those who live with family (see other chart), the present chart shows that the increase in pandemic-related social isolation was also experienced by those living with family.

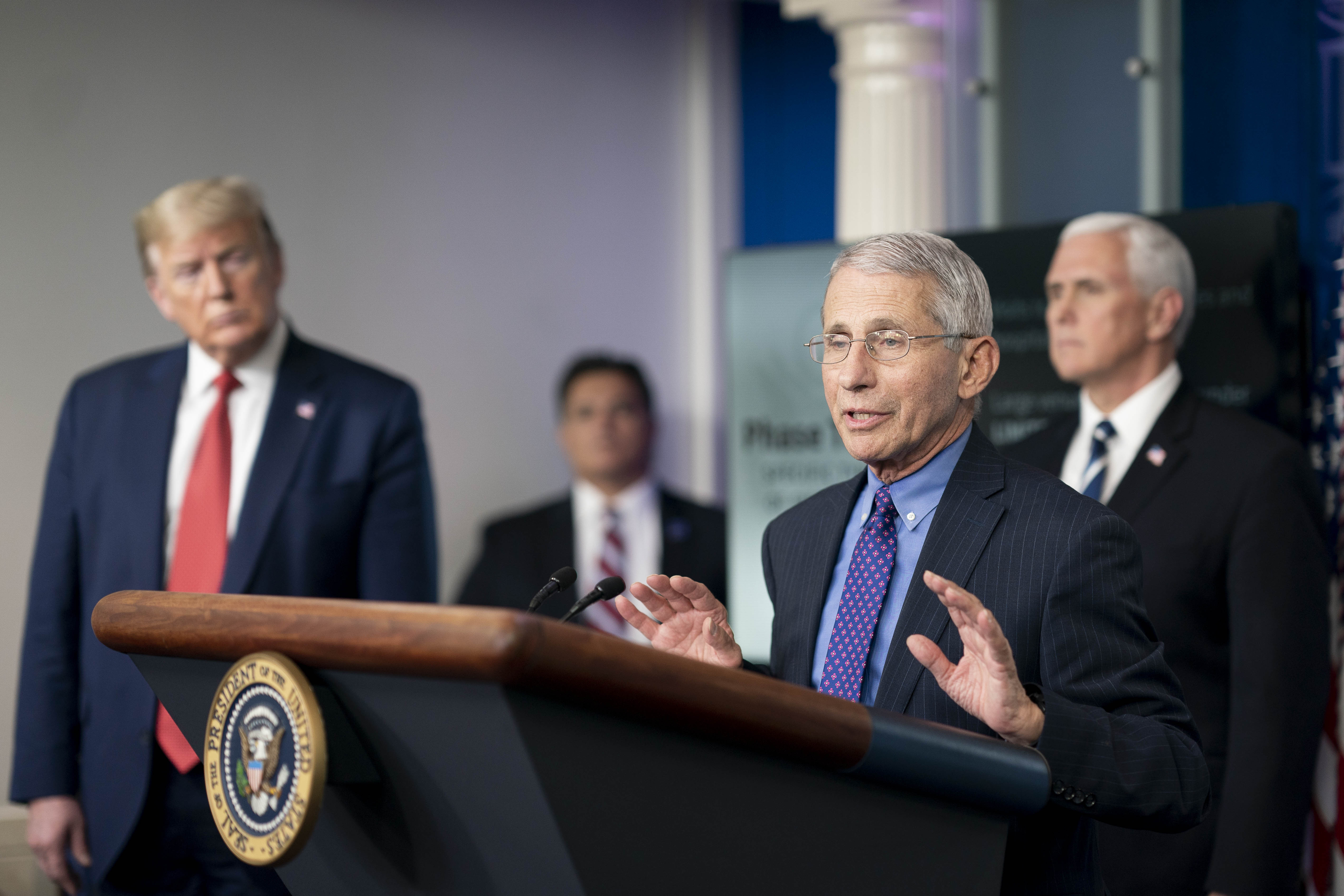
Fauci speaking to the press on the pandemic in April 2020. As in the rest of the world, previously unknown health officials became household names

The pandemic had far-reaching consequences beyond the disease itself and efforts to contain it, including political, cultural, and social implications.

From the earliest days of the pandemic, there were reported incidents of xenophobia and racism against Asian Americans. During the first year, an ad-hoc organization called Stop AAPI Hate received 3,795 reports of racism against Asian Americans and Pacific Islanders.

Disproportionate numbers of cases have been observed among Black and Latino populations. Of four studies published in September 2020, three found clear disparities due to race and the fourth found slightly better survival rates for Hispanics and Blacks. As of September 15, 2020, Blacks had COVID-19 mortality rates more than twice as high as the rate for Whites and Asians, who have the lowest rates. CNN reported in May 2020 that the Navajo Nation had the highest rate of infection in the United States. In June 2021, the CDC confirmed these numbers, reporting that American Indian or Alaska Native, Non-Hispanic persons had the highest rates of both hospitalizations and deaths, while Hispanic and Latino persons suffered the highest rates of COVID compared to White persons. However, the CDC noted that only 61% of case reports included race and ethnicity data, which could result in inaccurate estimates of the relative risk among groups. Additionally, a study published by the New England Journal of Medicine in July 2020 revealed that the effect of stress and weathering on minority groups decreases their stamina against COVID.

From 2019 to 2020, in the United States, the life expectancy of a Hispanic American decreased three years, for an African American 2.9 years, and for a White American 1.2 years. The COVID Tracking Project published data revealing that people of color were contracting and dying from COVID-19 at higher rates than Whites. An NPR analysis of April–September 2020 data from the COVID Tracking Project found that Black people's share of COVID-19 deaths across the United States was 1.5 times greater (in some states 2.5 times greater) than their share of the U.S. population. Similarly, Hispanics and Latinos were disproportionately infected in 45 states and had a disproportionate share of the deaths in 19 states. Native American and Alaskan Native cases and deaths were disproportionally high in at least 21 states and, in some, as much as five times more than average. White non-Hispanics died at a lower rate than their share of the population in 36 states and D.C.

Life expectancy continued to fall from 2020 to 2021.

By April 2020, closed schools affected more than 55 million students. Higher education was also impacted in a variety of different ways.

=== Elections ===
The pandemic prompted calls from voting rights groups and some Democratic Party leaders to expand mail-in voting, while Republican leaders generally opposed the change. Some states were unable to agree on changes, resulting in lawsuits. Responding to Democratic proposals for nationwide mail-in voting as part of a COVID-19 relief law, Trump said "you'd never have a Republican elected in this country again" despite evidence the change would not favor any particular group. Trump called mail-in voting "corrupt" and said voters should be required to show up in person, even though, as reporters pointed out, he had himself voted by mail in the last Florida primary. Though mail-in vote fraud was slightly higher than in-person voter fraud, both instances were rare, and mail-in voting can be made more secure by disallowing third parties to collect ballots and providing free drop-off locations or prepaid postage.

High COVID-19 fatalities at the state and county level correlated with a drop in expressed support for the election of Republicans, including the reelection of Trump, according to a study published in Science Advances that compared opinions in January–February 2020 with opinions in June 2020.

=== Hospital care crisis ===
The impact of the COVID-19 pandemic on hospitals became severe for some hospital systems of the United States in the spring of 2020, a few months after the COVID-19 pandemic began. Some had started to run out of beds, along with having shortages of nurses and doctors. By November 2020, with 13 million cases so far, hospitals throughout the country had been overwhelmed with record numbers of COVID-19 patients. Nursing students had to fill in on an emergency basis, and field hospitals were set up to handle the overflow.

At the beginning of 2021, cases had reached a peak, forcing some hospitals to periodically close their doors because they were overwhelmed with COVID-19 patients. In some places, as hospital space filled up, ambulances often waited hours to deliver patients. In addition, patients already admitted might get discharged earlier than usual to make room for others more severely ill. By early September, at least seven states had called in their National Guard to help overworked hospitals, including Oregon, Idaho, Montana, Kentucky, Tennessee, Georgia, and South Carolina.

The summer of 2021 saw another surge due to the new Delta variant of the virus. As a result, health care in U.S. hospitals was severely affected and led to crisis standards of care. Many hospitals were thereby unable to offer adequate medical care as a result of tight resources. For example, one hospital system in Oregon had to cancel or delay hundreds of surgeries as of mid-August. Hospitals also began seeing younger patients. And some experts found that the Delta variant was often more severe among younger age groups, whose vaccination rates were lower.

States like California saw over ten times more cases than they had just a few months earlier. By mid-August 2021, nearly all states experienced double-digit growth in COVID-19 hospitalizations. Some, like Washington, had a 34% increase of patients over a single week in September. At various medical centers, ICUs had reached capacity, forcing doctors to postpone routine surgeries. In addition, countless hospitals were also short of beds and nurses, making care and response times a lot slower. It meant that patients might wait in the ER for many hours. While some hospitals with no more capacity had to find alternate medical facilities in other states, often hundreds of miles away.

Emergency medical services in the United States also experienced a significant labor shortage, lengthening the time it took some patients to be transported to a hospital.

== Vaccination campaign ==
The US map below is for the percent of people of all ages who received all doses prescribed by the initial COVID-19 vaccination protocol. Two of the three COVID-19 vaccines used in the U.S. require two shots to be fully vaccinated. The other vaccine requires only one shot. Booster doses were recommended too.

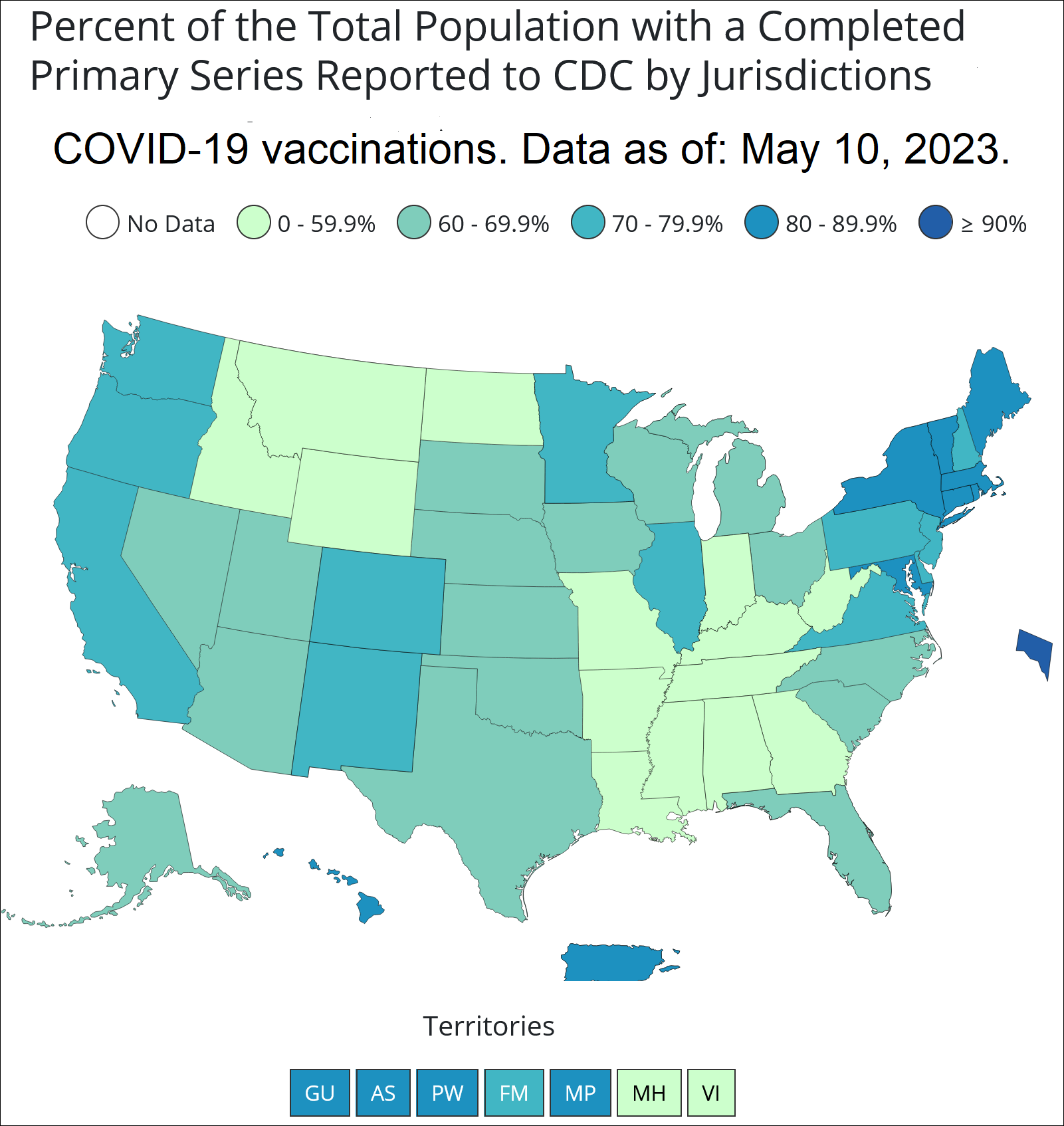
Percent of people fully vaccinated as of May 2023

=== Timeline graph of doses administered ===
Timeline of daily COVID-19 vaccine doses administered in the US

See the latest date on the timeline at the bottom.

=== Background to various vaccines ===
The COVID-19 vaccination campaign in the United States was a mass immunization campaign for the COVID-19 pandemic in the United States. The Food and Drug Administration (FDA) first granted emergency use authorization to the Pfizer–BioNTech vaccine on December 10, 2020, and mass vaccinations began four days later. The Moderna vaccine was granted emergency use authorization on December 17, 2020, and the Janssen (Johnson & Johnson) vaccine was granted emergency use authorization on February 27, 2021. It was not until April 19, 2021, that all U.S. states had opened vaccine eligibility to residents aged 16 and over. On May 10, 2021, the FDA approved the Pfizer-BioNTech vaccine for adolescents aged 12 to 15. On August 23, 2021, the FDA granted full approval to the Pfizer–BioNTech vaccine for individuals aged 16 and over.

The U.S. government began the campaign under the presidency of Donald Trump with Operation Warp Speed, a public–private partnership to expedite the development and manufacturing of COVID-19 vaccines. Joe Biden became the new president of the United States on January 20, 2021. Biden had an immediate goal of administering 100 million vaccine doses within his first hundred days in office, and signed an executive order which increased supplies for vaccination. This goal was met on March 19, 2021. On March 25, 2021, he announced he would increase the goal to 200 million within his first 100 days in office. This goal was reached on April 21, 2021.

By July 4, 2021, 67% of the United States' adult population had received at least one dose, just short of a goal of 70%. This goal was met on August 2, 2021. While vaccines have helped significantly reduce the number of new COVID-19 infections nationwide, states with below-average vaccination rates began to see increasing numbers of cases credited to the highly infectious Delta variant by July 2021, which led to an increased push by organizations and companies to begin imposing de facto mandates for their employees be vaccinated for COVID-19.

On September 9, 2021, President Biden announced plans by the federal government to use executive orders and emergency temporary standards enforced by OSHA to mandate the vaccination of all federal branch employees, and require that all companies with more than 100 employees regularly test all employees who are not yet fully vaccinated for COVID-19. On January 26, 2022, OSHA withdrew the vaccine mandate for companies with more than 100 employees due to a ruling from the Supreme Court of the United States that blocked the mandate.

As of November 2022, according to The Commonwealth Fund, COVID-19 vaccination in the United States has prevented an additional 3.2 million deaths, an additional 18.5 million hospitalizations, and an additional 120 million infections from COVID-19. Vaccination has also prevented an additional $899.4 billion in healthcare costs. According to a June 2022 study published in The Lancet, COVID-19 vaccination in the United States prevented an additional 1.9 million deaths from December 8, 2020, to December 8, 2021. According to a July 2022 study published in JAMA Network Open, COVID-19 vaccination in the United States prevented an additional 235,000 deaths, an additional 1.6 million hospitalizations, and an additional 27 million infections from December 1, 2020, to September 30, 2021.

=== Vaccine mandates ===
By August 2021, more than 800 colleges and universities, over 200 health care companies and dozens of states, local governments and school districts, had some type of vaccination requirements. Biden appealed to public organizations and private companies to require employees to be vaccinated, which companies are allowed to do under the protection of the U.S. Equal Employment Opportunity Commission.

Until August to September 2021, many companies were giving bonuses for getting vaccinated. Nonetheless, nearly 2,000 private hospitals and health systems had previously issued vaccine mandates. Many companies outside health care did the same, such as United Airlines, Tyson Foods, and Walmart among them. Washington state had already required vaccines for all state employees and contractors. With the new Delta variant spreading infections more quickly due to its higher transmissibility, companies including Facebook, Google, and Salesforce, have already issued employee vaccine mandates.

According to a USA Today poll from August 2021, 68% supported a business's right to refuse service to unvaccinated customers, and 62% supported employer's right to mandate vaccinations to its employees. In the same poll, 72% also felt that mandating masks was "a matter of health and safety" and should not be considered an infringement of personal liberty.

=== Effectiveness of COVID-19 vaccines ===
After the December 2020 introduction of COVID vaccines, a partisan gap in death rates developed, indicating the effects of vaccine skepticism. As of March 2024, more than 30 percent of Republicans had not received a Covid vaccine, compared with less than 10 percent of Democrats.

Death rates for unvaccinated Americans substantially exceed those who were vaccinated, with bivalent boosters further reducing the death rate.

Evidence from vaccine use during the pandemic shows vaccination can reduce infection and is most effective at preventing severe COVID-19 symptoms and death, but is less good at preventing mild COVID-19. Efficacy wanes over time but can be maintained with boosters. In 2021, the CDC reported that unvaccinated people were 10 times more likely to be hospitalized and 11 times more likely to die than fully vaccinated people.

The CDC reported that vaccine effectiveness fell from 91% against Alpha to 66% against Delta. One expert stated that "those who are infected following vaccination are still not getting sick and not dying like was happening before vaccination." By late August 2021, the Delta variant accounted for 99 percent of U.S. cases and was found to double the risk of severe illness and hospitalization for those not yet vaccinated.

On 10 December 2021, the UK Health Security Agency reported that early data indicated a 20- to 40-fold reduction in neutralizing activity for Omicron by sera from Pfizer 2-dose vaccinees relative to earlier strains. After a booster dose (usually with an mRNA vaccine), vaccine effectiveness against symptomatic disease was at 70%–75%, and the effectiveness against severe disease was expected to be higher.

A meta-analysis looking into COVID-19 vaccine differences in immunosuppressed individuals found that people with a weakened immune system are less able to produce neutralizing antibodies. For example, organ transplant recipients need three vaccines to achieve seroconversion. A study on the serologic response to mRNA vaccines among patients with lymphoma, leukemia, and myeloma found that one-quarter of patients did not produce measurable antibodies, varying by cancer type.

In February 2023, a systematic review in The Lancet said that the protection afforded by infection was comparable to that from vaccination, albeit with an increased risk of severe illness and death from the disease of an initial infection.

A January 2024 study by the CDC found that staying up to date on the vaccines could reduce the risk of strokes, blood clots and heart attacks related to COVID-19 in people aged 65 years or older or with a condition that makes them more vulnerable to said conditions.

== Transition to later phases ==
On February 17, 2022, Governor Gavin Newsom announced a formal shift toward endemic management of COVID-19 in California, saying "we are moving past the crisis phase into a phase where we will work to live with this virus".

During his State of the Union Address on March 1, Biden stated that "because of the progress we've made, because of your resilience and the tools we have, tonight I can say we are moving forward safely, back to more normal routines". However, he also stated that the federal government would "never just accept living with COVID-19", explaining that it would "continue to combat the virus as we do other diseases". The White House released a new action plan the next day, which included plans to make COVID-19 antiviral medication available for free to high-risk patients at testing locations such as pharmacies and clinics, funding in support of vigilance and preparedness in the event of new surges and variants, preventing the closure of schools and businesses, and ensuring global vaccine distribution.

On April 26, Fauci said that the United States was "out of the pandemic phase" and the following day, stated that "we're really in a transitional phase...into hopefully a more controlled phase and endemicity", but further clarified that "the world is still in a pandemic...we are still experiencing a pandemic" and the United States could still see new waves of infection. Fauci's comments followed a report from the CDC indicating that the United States had a much higher level of collective immunity at this time, due to the Omicron variant.

On May 16, Joseph Wendelken, a spokesman for the Rhode Island Department of Health stated that COVID-19 was now "an endemic disease" and said "we should expect moderate increases and decreases in our COVID-19 levels over the coming months". In an interview with 60 Minutes aired on September 18, Biden declared that the pandemic stage of COVID-19 was over in the United States.

== Preparations made after previous outbreaks ==
The United States has experienced pandemics and epidemics throughout its history, including the 1918 Spanish flu, the 1957 Asian flu, and the 1968 Hong Kong flu pandemics. In the most recent pandemic prior to COVID-19, the 2009 swine flu pandemic took the lives of more than 12,000 Americans and hospitalized another 270,000 over the course of approximately a year.

According to the Global Health Security Index, an American-British assessment which ranks the health security capabilities in 195 countries, the U.S. was the "most prepared" nation in 2020. In September 2019, the Trump administration terminated United States Agency for International Development's PREDICT program, a $200 million epidemiological research program initiated in 2009 to provide early warning of pandemics abroad. The program trained scientists in sixty foreign laboratories to detect and respond to viruses that have the potential to cause pandemics. One such laboratory was the Wuhan lab that first identified the virus that causes COVID-19. After revival in April 2020, the program was given two 6-month extensions to help fight COVID-19 in the U.S. and other countries.

== Statistics ==
The CDC publishes official numbers of COVID-19 cases in the United States. The CDC estimates that, between February 2020 and September 2021, only 1 in 1.3 COVID-19 deaths were attributed to COVID-19. The true COVID-19 death toll in the United States would therefore be higher than official reports, as modeled by a paper published in The Lancet Regional Health - Americas. One way to estimate COVID-19 deaths that includes unconfirmed cases is to use the excess mortality, which is the overall number of deaths that exceed what would normally be expected. From March 1, 2020, through the end of 2020, there were 522,368 excess deaths in the United States, or 22.9% more deaths than would have been expected in that time period.

In February 2020, at the beginning of the pandemic, a shortage of tests made it impossible to confirm all possible COVID-19 cases and resulting deaths, so the early numbers were likely undercounts.

== See also ==
- COVID-19 pandemic by country and territory
- COVID-19 pandemic in North America
- Misinformation related to the COVID-19 pandemic
- United States House Select Subcommittee on the Coronavirus Crisis
