= Forum (KQED) =

Radio program produced by KQED-FM

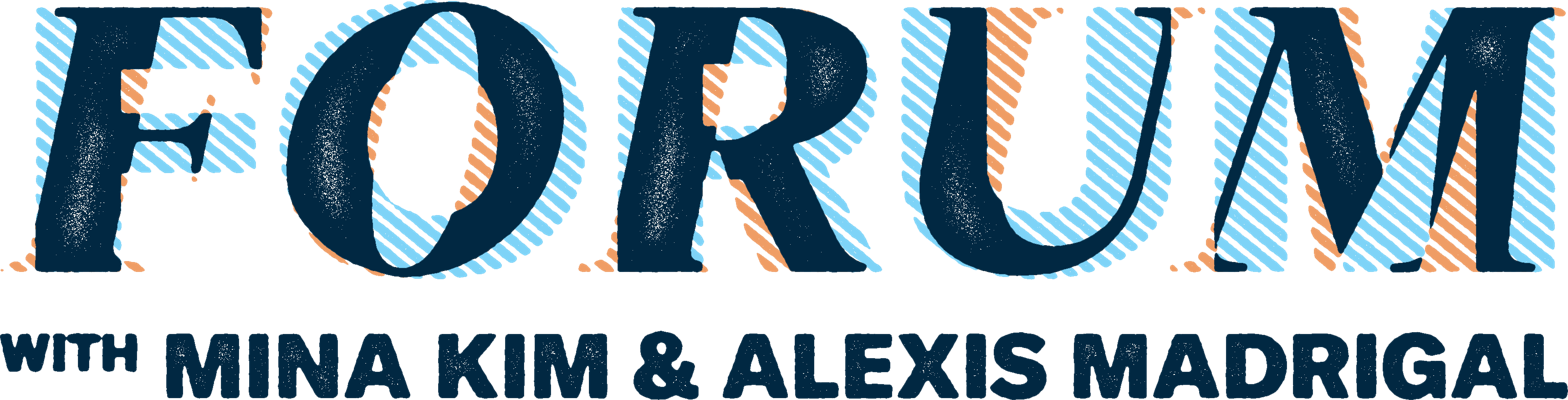
- Genre: Talk radio
- Running time: ca. 105 min. (9 a.m.-11 a.m.)
- Country of origin: United States
- Language: English
- Home station: KQED-FM
- Syndicates: KQED-FM; Sirius Satellite Radio
- Hosted by: Mina Kim and Alexis Madrigal
- Created by: Kevin Pursglove
- Produced by: Marlena Jackson-Retondo; Jennifer Ng; Mark Nieto; Caroline Smith; Blanca Torres; Grace Won
- Executive producers: Susan Britton; Judy Campbell
- Senior editor: Daniel Zoll
- Recording studio: San Francisco, California
- Original release: 1987 – present
- Audio format: Stereophonic
- Opening theme: "Peter Pan" by Mike Marshall
- Website: www.kqed.org/forum
- Podcast: KQED Podcasts

Forum is a two-hour live call-in radio program produced by KQED-FM, presenting discussions of local, state, national and international issues, and in-depth interviews.

== History ==
The program began in 1987 as a politics-oriented talk show, created and hosted by Kevin Pursglove, who left to become spokesman for San Jose's then-mayor Susan Hammer, and later eBay.

From 1993 to 2021, it was hosted by scholar, author, professor, and former KGO Radio host Michael Krasny, who broadened the program's scope to a cross-section of current events. After hosting the show for nearly 30 years, Krasny announced his retirement effective February 2021.

Starting in June 2021, after a number of guests hosted the show in the months prior, Alexis Madrigal was selected to be the new host of the 9 am hour along with Mina Kim, who had already hosted the 10 am hour since July 2020.

== Format ==
The format of Forum varies from show to show, but generally involves an in-person interview followed by public Q&A via phone or email with one or more subjects, often nationally prominent authors and scholars. The program airs for two hours on weekday mornings, with an hour repeated in the evening.

== Online engagement ==
Listeners can telephone, email, tweet, and Facebook. The station also launched a Discord server, "traditionally a space for online gamers", to improve its engagement with its audience, saying it was the first station to do so and drawing inspiration from Bellingcat and the Monterey Bay Aquarium.

Ask Forum uses large language model and generative AI, in addition to traditional search methods, to find archived Forum episodes, using transcripts as a primary source, and with AI transcription services like Trint, Otter.ai, and Descript.
