= Michael Krasny (talk show host) =

American professor and radio host (born 1944)

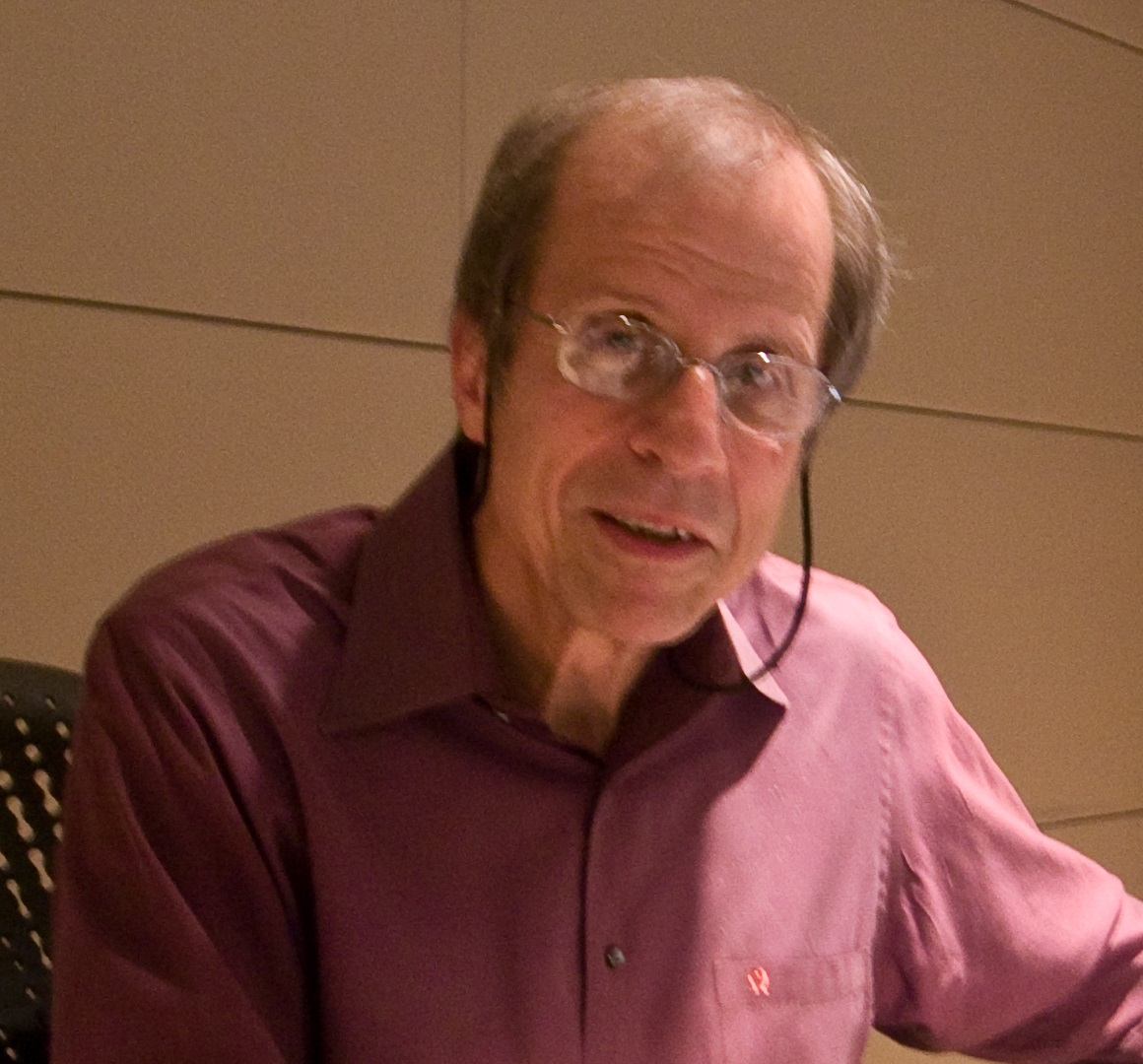
- Krasny in 2008
- Born: Michael Jay Krasny; September 22, 1944 (age 82); Cleveland, Ohio, United States
- Education: Ohio University (BA, MA); University of Wisconsin–Madison (PhD)
- Children: 2
- Presenting career
- Show: Forum
- Stations: KQED-FM, Sirius
- Time slot: Monday–Thursday, 9:00-11:00 a.m. (Pacific)
- Style: Presenter
- Country: United States
- Previous shows: KTIM (FM) - Beyond the Hot Tub - KGO (AM) - Nightfocus; KRON-TV - Take Issue; NPR - Talk of the Nation

Michael Jay Krasny (born September 22, 1944) is an American former radio host and former academic. He was a radio host of Forum, a news and public affairs program on San Francisco public radio station KQED-FM, covering current events, politics, and culture from 1993 to 2021. Additionally, Krasny was a professor of English language and literature at San Francisco State University from 1970 to 2021.

== Early life ==
Born in Cleveland and raised in Cleveland Heights, Ohio, and his father worked at an ice cream factory. Krasny is a second-generation American whose grandparents emigrated from Russia and Lithuania. He grew up in a Jewish household.

Krasny is among the graduates of Cleveland Heights High School (class of 1962) featured in the book Every Tiger Has a Tale. Despite his intellectual reputation today, Krasny admits to having had a "bad boy" reputation while growing up in Cleveland Heights.

== Career ==
In the late 1970s, Krasny hosted a weekly Marin County talk show called "Beyond the Hot Tub" on low-power rock radio station KTIM-FM. He went on to host a popular radio program on KGO (AM) from 1984 to December 1992. He became the host of Forum in 1993, expanding the focus of the program to more national themes. On November 9, 2020, Krasny announced that he would retire from Forum on February 15, 2021. His last Forum broadcast was on February 12, 2021.

Krasny taught in the Department of English at San Francisco State University from 1970 to 2021. He earned his B.A. cum laude in 1966 and M.A. in 1967 from Ohio University, where he attended the Honors College and became a member of Phi Beta Kappa. He holds a Ph.D. in 20th century American literature from the University of Wisconsin–Madison.

Krasny is a widely published scholar, critic and fiction writer. He has also worked widely as a facilitator and host in the corporate sector and as a moderator for nonprofit events.

== Personal life ==
Krasny is a longtime resident of Greenbrae, California. SFSU Online Magazine reports that Krasny's wife is an attorney and an alumna of San Francisco State University, and that Krasny has two daughters.

In his 2010 book, Spiritual Envy, Krasny revealed that he became agnostic later in life.

== Bibliography ==
- Krasny, Michael (2007). Off Mike: A Memoir of Talk Radio and Literary Life. Stanford General Books. ISBN 978-0-8047-5671-6.
- Krasny, Michael (2010). Spiritual Envy: An Agnostic's Quest. New World Library. ISBN 978-1-57731-912-2.
- Krasny, Michael (2016). Let There Be Laughter: A Treasury of Great Jewish Humor and What It All Means. HarperCollins. ISBN 9780062422057.
