= Johns Hopkins Center for Health Security =

Nonprofit biosecurity think tank

- Abbreviation: CHS
- Formation: 1998; 28 years ago
- Founder: D. A. Henderson
- Type: Think tank
- Location: Baltimore, Maryland, US
- Director: Tom Inglesby, MD
- Deputy Director: Anita Cicero, JD
- Key people: Tara O'Toole; Caitlin Rivers; Tara Kirk; Crystal Watson; Alexandra Phelan; Jassi Pannu
- Affiliations: Johns Hopkins Bloomberg School of Public Health
- Website: www.centerforhealthsecurity.org
- Formerly called: Johns Hopkins Center for Civilian Biodefense Strategies (1998–2003); Center for Biosecurity of UPMC (2003–2013); UPMC Center for Health Security (2013–2017)

The Johns Hopkins Center for Health Security (CHS) is an independent, nonprofit organization of Johns Hopkins University and the Johns Hopkins Bloomberg School of Public Health. The center works on health security issues including prevention and preparation for epidemics and pandemics; biological weapons prevention; and the biosecurity implications of emerging technologies, including artificial intelligence and synthetic biology.

The center is designated an official Collaborating Centre of the World Health Organization and the Pan American Health Organization; it provides policy recommendations to governments worldwide including the United States government, the European Union, and the United Nations Biological Weapons Convention.

== History ==
=== Founding ===
The Center for Health Security was founded in 1998 by D. A. Henderson, the physician who led the successful WHO smallpox eradication campaign. It was originally named the Johns Hopkins Center for Civilian Biodefense Strategies (CCBS). At that time, the center was the first and only academic center focused on biosecurity policy and practice. Henderson became aware of the Soviet Union's offensive biological weapons program in 1989, which was in direct defiance of the 1972 Biological Weapons Convention multilateral disarmament treaty. Routine vaccination against smallpox ended globally in 1980, meaning the use of smallpox as a biological weapon would have catastrophic consequences.

In 1998, the Center was established with a founding team of Dr. Tara O'Toole, Dr. Tom Inglesby, and Dr. Monica Schoch-Spana, with the goal of rigorous research and advocacy to counter bioterrorism and emerging infectious diseases such as pandemic influenza, HIV, and monkeypox. One of their first proposals to the United States Government was to procure 40 million doses of stockpiled smallpox vaccine, which was supported by President Bill Clinton.

=== Operation Dark Winter ===
In June 2001, the Center hosted a tabletop exercise named Dark Winter in collaboration with the Center for Strategic and International Studies (CSIS), the Homeland Security Institute (ANSER), and the Oklahoma Memorial Institute for the Prevention of Terrorism. Dark Winter drew an analogy with the destructive power of a nuclear explosion, but instead focused on the catastrophic consequences of an deliberate, weaponized smallpox epidemic. Dark Winter was the first biological weapons tabletop exercise of its kind; media coverage was extensive and six subsequent congressional hearings were held.

=== Smallpox vaccine stockpiling ===
The September 11 attacks by terrorists on the United States prompted further fear of a biological weapons attack. Subsequent attacks via letters laced with anthrax spores. In preparation for possible follow-on attacks, the Center uncovered that much of the smallpox vaccine stockpile in the US had expired, ultimately prompting then HHS Secretary Tommy Thompson to commit to stockpiling a dose of smallpox vaccine for every person in America. For this purpose, $3 billion was appropriated by Congress. Secretary Thompson requested Henderson assume responsibility for the Office of Public Health Preparedness (later the Office of the Assistant Secretary for Preparedness and Response); O'Toole and Inglesby assumed leadership of the Center and renamed it the Center for Biosecurity. In 2003 it came under the aegis of the University of Pittsburgh.

=== Atlantic storm ===
On January 14, 2005, the Center organized a table-top exercise for senior political leaders from Europe, Canada, and the United States. It was supported by the Alfred P. Sloan Foundation, and the Nuclear Threat Initiative. The former Secretary of State Madeleine Albright and former Director General of the WHO and Prime Minister of Norway Dr. Gro Brundtland, were among those that participated.

=== Johns Hopkins School of Public Health ===
In January 2017, the Center returned to the Johns Hopkins Bloomberg School of Public Health under its current name, the Johns Hopkins Center for Health Security.

== Funding ==
The Center was established in 1998 with 1 year of funding from the United States Department of Health and Human Services. In 2000, the Center began receiving funding from the Alfred P. Sloan Foundation, as well as grants from the US federal government.

In January 2017, Coefficient Giving (formerly the Open Philanthropy Project) awarded a $16 million grant over three years to the Center for Health Security; this was renewed for $20 million in 2019 and $10 million in 2023.

In 2023 the Center was awarded $23.5 million from the US Centers for Disease Control and Prevention for epidemic preparedness.

== Publications ==
The Center for Health Security publishes the newsletter:

- Health Security Decoded, a monthly roundup of top news and developments in health security.

It previously published the Clinicians' Biosecurity News (formerly the Clinicians' Biosecurity Network Report), and Health Security Headlines (previously called Biosecurity Briefing, Health Security Headlines, and Preparedness Pulsepoints.

It maintains and edits the peer-reviewed journal Health Security which was launched in 2003 and called Biosecurity and Bioterrorism: Biodefense Strategy, Practice, and Science until 2015.

CHS published the blog The Bifurcated Needle until 2020.

The center has published in journals including Science, Nature, JAMA and The Lancet. A full list of publications is available on the CHS website. As of February 2017, the list shows more than 400 publications.

Additional publications:

- Boddie, Crystal; Watson, Matthew; Ackerman, Gary; Gronvall, Gigi Kwik (August 21, 2015). "Assessing the bioweapons threat: Is there a foundation of agreement among experts about risk?" (PDF). Science. 349 (6250): 792–793. doi:10.1126/science.aab0713. ISSN 0036-8075. PMID 26293941. S2CID 206637099. Archived from the original (PDF) on September 18, 2017.
- Inglesby, Thomas V.; Relman, David A. (February 1, 2016). "How likely is it that biological agents will be used deliberately to cause widespread harm?". EMBO Reports. 17 (2): 127–130. doi:10.15252/embr.201541674. ISSN 1469-3178. PMC 5290809. PMID 26682799.
- Gronvall, Gigi Kwik; Shearer, Matthew; Collins, Hannah; Inglesby, Thomas (July 14, 2016). "Improving Security through International Biosafety Norms" (PDF). UPMC Center for Health Security. Archived from the original (PDF) on November 9, 2016.

== Major conferences and tabletop exercises ==
=== Operation Dark Winter ===
From June 22–23, 2001, CHS co-hosted Operation Dark Winter, a senior-level bioterrorism attack simulation involving a covert and widespread smallpox attack on the United States.

=== Atlantic Storm ===
On January 14, 2005, CHS helped to host Atlantic Storm, a table-top smallpox bioterrorism simulation.

=== Clade X ===
On May 15, 2018, the Center hosted Clade X, a day-long pandemic tabletop exercise that simulated a series of National Security Council–convened meetings of 10 US government leaders, played by individuals prominent in the fields of national security or epidemic response.

Drawing from actual events, Clade X identified important policy issues and preparedness challenges that could be solved with sufficient political will and attention. These issues were designed in a narrative to engage and educate the participants and the audience.

Clade X was livestreamed on Facebook and extensive materials from the exercise are available online.

=== Event 201 ===
On October 18, 2019, the CHS partnered with the World Economic Forum and the Bill and Melinda Gates Foundation to host the tabletop exercise Event 201 in New York City. According to the CHS, "the exercise illustrated areas where public/private partnerships will be necessary during the response to a severe pandemic in order to diminish large-scale economic and societal consequences".

Event 201 simulated the effects of a fictional coronavirus passing to humans via infected pig farms in Brazil with "no possibility of a vaccine being available in the first year". The simulation ended after 18 months and projected 65 million deaths from the coronavirus.

=== Southeast Asia Biosecurity Dialogue ===
A series of Track II multilateral dialogues cohosted by the Center in the Southeast Asia region ultimately helped to establish the Asia Centre for Health Security.

=== Artificial intelligence ===
Since 2023, the Center has worked extensively on the convergence of artificial intelligence and biotechnology, establishing the shorthand AIxBio within this field.

On November 29, 2023 the Center hosted a convening to discuss pandemic-level biosecurity threats that may arise from artificial intelligence, attended by representatives from the United States National Security Council, United States Department of Energy, White House Office of Pandemic Preparedness and Response Policy, United Kingdom Cabinet Office, OpenAI, Anthropic, Microsoft, Meta, Google DeepMind, Amazon, RAND, and others.

The Center has provided policy recommendations to governments and AI Safety Institutes globally regarding several issues at the intersection of artificial intelligence and biosecurity, including biological data governance, open source models, export controls, risk assessment, model evaluations, and safeguards.

=== Other ===
- Improving Epidemic Response: Building Bridges Between the US and China. May 2012.
- Considerations for the Reauthorization of the Pandemic and All-Hazards Preparedness Act (PAHPA). March 2012.
- U.S. Preparedness for a Nuclear Detonation. October 2011.
- Charting the Future of Biosecurity: Ten Years After the Anthrax Attacks. October 2011.
- Advancing US Resilience to a Nuclear Catastrophe. May 2011.
- Preserving National Security: The Growing Role of the Life Sciences. March 2011.
- Improving Global Health, Strengthening Global Security. November 2010.
- The State of BIOPreparedness: Lessons from Leaders, Proposals for Progress. September 2010.
- Preparing to Save Lives and Recover After a Nuclear Detonation: Implications for US Policy. April 2010.
- The 2009 H1N1 Experience: Policy Implications for Future Infectious Disease Emergencies. March 2010.
- Resilient American Communities: Progress In Practice and Policy. December 10, 2009.
- Prevention of Biothreats: A Look Ahead. October 6, 2009.
- Disease, Disaster, and Democracy: The Public's Stake in Health Emergency Planning. May 2006.
- Bulls, Bears, and Birds: Preparing the Financial Industry for a Pandemic. September 2005.
- Conference on Biosafety and Biorisks. May 2005.
- The Public as an Asset, Not a Problem: A Summit on Leadership During Bioterrorism. February 2003.
- 2nd National Symposium on Medical and Public Health Response to Bioterrorism. November 2000.
- National Symposium on Medical and Public Health Response to Bioterrorism. February 1999.

== See also ==
- Alfred P. Sloan Foundation
- Anti-terrorism legislation
- Biological Weapons Anti-Terrorism Act of 1989
- Cartagena Protocol on Biosafety
- Center for Strategic and International Studies
- Convention on Biological Diversity
- Council of Europe Convention on the Prevention of Terrorism
- Crimson Contagion
- European BioSafety Association
- European Programme for Intervention Epidemiology Training
- Eurosurveillance
- Global catastrophic risk
- Global Health Security Initiative
- Health Threat Unit
- International Health Regulations
- Johns Hopkins Berman Institute of Bioethics
- Office of the Assistant Secretary for Preparedness and Response
- Open Philanthropy Project § Biosecurity
- Operation Dark Winter
- Pandemic and All-Hazards Preparedness Reauthorization Act of 2013
- Public Health Emergency Preparedness
- PublicHealthEmergency.gov
