= Jay M. Cohen =

American admiral

Jay Cohen
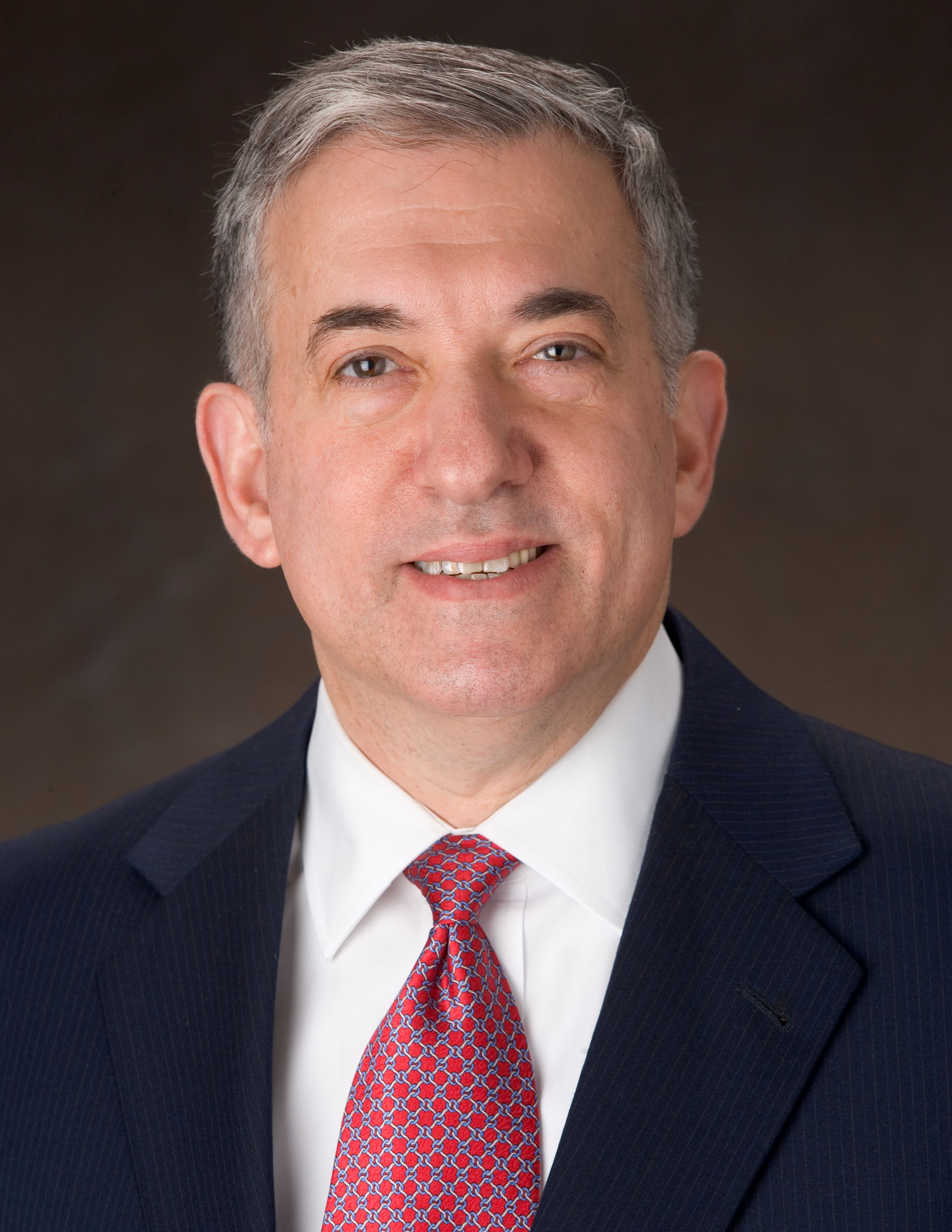

Under Secretary of Homeland Security for Science and Technology
- In office August 10, 2006 – January 20, 2009
- President: George W. Bush
- Preceded by: Charles McQueary
- Succeeded by: Tara O'Toole

Personal details
- Born: December 12, 1946 (age 79) New York City, New York, U.S.
- Party: Republican
- Education: United States Naval Academy (BS)

Jay Martin Cohen (born December 12, 1946) is a retired Rear Admiral of the United States Navy and former Under Secretary of Homeland Security for Science and Technology of the United States Department of Homeland Security.

He entered the Navy in 1968 as an ensign after graduation from the United States Naval Academy. His last assignment was (20th) Chief of Naval Research commanding the Office of Naval Research (2000-2006) and retired on February 1, 2006.

Cohen was sworn in as Under Secretary at the Department of Homeland Security on August 10, 2006.

Cohen received a joint Ocean Engineering degree from Massachusetts Institute of Technology and Woods Hole Oceanographic Institution and a Master of Science degree in Marine Engineering and Naval Architecture from MIT.

He served as the Under Secretary of Homeland Security for Science and Technology in the United States Department of Homeland Security from 2006 to 2009. He now is a principal in the Chertoff Group and serves on the board of directors of assorted high tech and security companies.

Political offices
Preceded by Charles McQueary	Under Secretary of Homeland Security for Science and Technology; 2006–2009	Succeeded by Tara O'Toole
