= Caitlin Rivers =

American epidemiologist

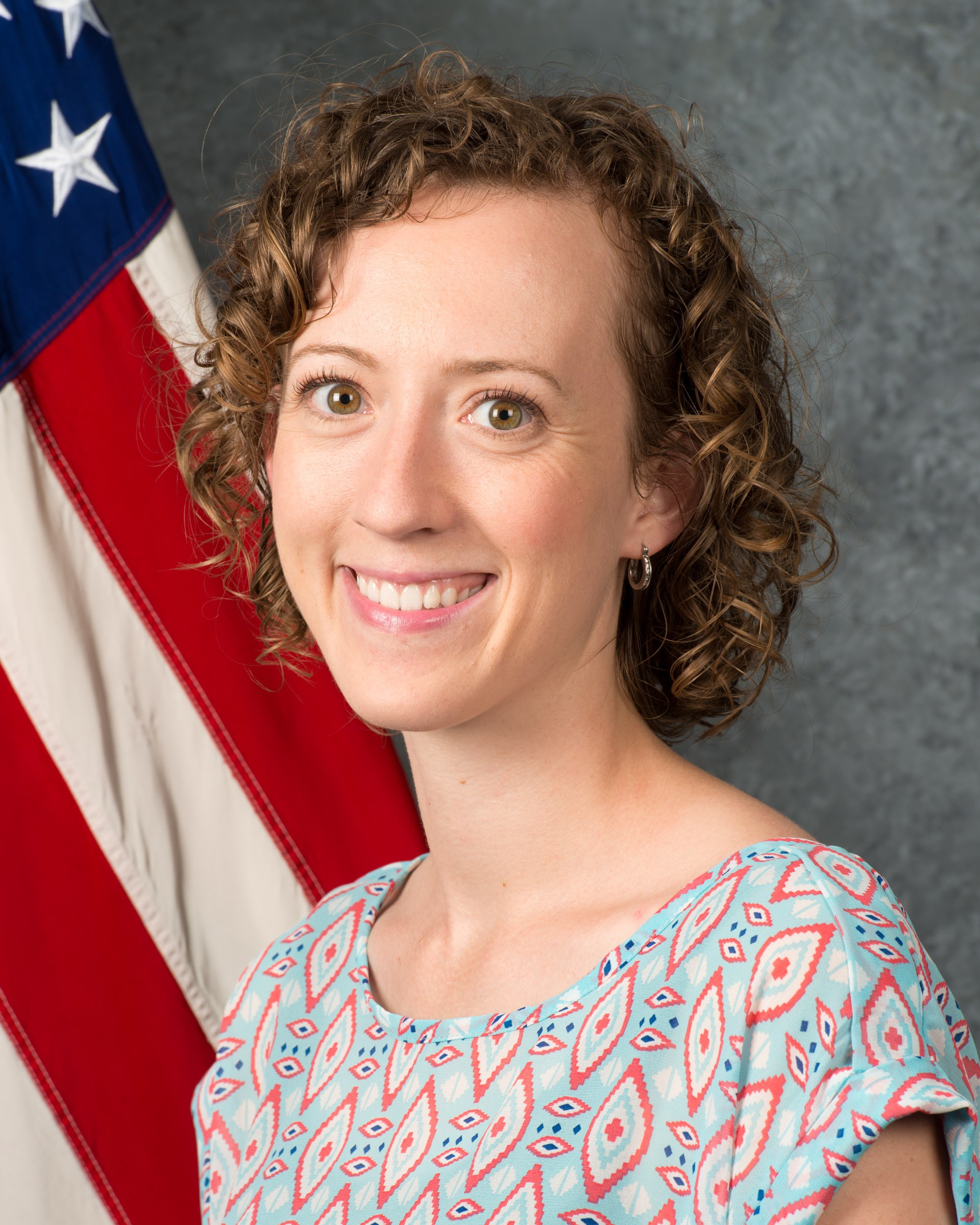
- Rivers c. 2017
- Born: United States
- Other name: Caitlin Yeaton
- Education: University of New Hampshire (BS); Virginia Tech (MPH, PhD)
- Occupation: Epidemiologist
- Years active: 2014-present
- Employer(s): Johns Hopkins Bloomberg School of Public Health, Johns Hopkins Center for Health Security (current); U.S. Army

Caitlin M. Rivers is an American epidemiologist who as Senior Scholar at the Johns Hopkins Center for Health Security and assistant professor at the Johns Hopkins Bloomberg School of Public Health, specializing on improving epidemic preparedness. Rivers is currently working on the American response to the COVID-19 pandemic with a focus on the incorporation of infectious disease modeling and forecasting into public health decision making.

== Early life and education ==
In 2011, Rivers received a bachelor's degree in anthropology from the University of New Hampshire, where she specialized in medical anthropology. She has said that she became interested in public health after reading Tracy Kidder's book, Mountains Beyond Mountains, which was about anthropologist and physician Paul Farmer's work on infectious disease eradication.

In 2013, Rivers received a master's degree in public health (MPH) with a concentration in infectious disease from Virginia Tech. In 2015, she received a PhD in the Genetics, Bioinformatics & Computational Biology program, where she specialized in computational epidemiology, from Virginia Tech. Her thesis was on modeling emerging infectious diseases for public health support, using non-traditional, public available sources of data, such as data collected from social media and Google search terms. She specifically focused on data related to outbreaks of avian influenza A (H7N9), Middle Eastern Respiratory Syndrome Coronavirus (MERS-CoV), and Ebola virus disease (EVD).

== Career ==
During her post-graduate studies, Rivers was a graduate research assistant at Biocomplexity Institute of Virginia Tech (formerly known as the Virginia Bioinformatics Institute) in Blacksburg, Virginia, where she built infectious disease models of emerging infectious diseases including Influenza A virus subtype H7N9, Middle East respiratory syndrome-related coronavirus, and the 2014-2015 Western African Ebola virus epidemic – the latter in coordination with the U.S. Department of Defense. Rivers maintained the only source of digital repository of data during the Ebola outbreak. As part of this work she developed Python tools, interfaces, and tutorials for epidemiologists.

From 2013 to 2015, Rivers was a civilian epidemiologist for the United States Army. She worked at the U.S. Army Public Health Center as part of the Science, Mathematics, And Research For Transformation (SMART) Defense Scholarship Program during her second year of her doctoral program. Rivers worked on the Army's Acute Respiratory Disease Surveillance Program, where she worked with Army data to monitor and track trends in infectious diseases and pinpoint where they occur.

In 2017, Rivers became a Senior Associate at the Johns Hopkins Center for Health Security and Assistant Professor in the Department of Environmental Health and Engineering at Johns Hopkins Bloomberg School of Public Health. Her work centers on modeling outbreaks of infectious diseases to help understand how an outbreak unfolds, its trajectory, and what approaches to take to slow—and eventually stop—the spread. She and her colleagues have advocated for integrating these modeling approaches in public health decision-making into an interdisciplinary field they call "outbreak science." She has argued for the creation of a National Infectious Disease Forecasting Center, which would play a role similar to that of the National Weather Service and act as a primary source of epidemiological models during times of crisis, while advancing the field.

== COVID-19 ==
As it emerged in late 2019, Rivers has applied her expertise in computational epidemiology to forecast the effects of the COVID-19 pandemic in the United States, using available data from previous outbreaks since the novel coronavirus. She and her colleagues used data from intensive care unit and inpatient bed needs in two Chinese cities (Wuhan and Guangzhou) to project what health care needs would be if and when the outbreak spread to the United States. Their analysis concluded that if an outbreak similar to the scale of the outbreak in Wuhan occurred in an American city, ICU needs of COVID-19 patients alone would exceed hospital capacity.

Rivers has used Twitter as a means of communicating her analyses as new data become available, refining the public's understanding of the trajectory of the pandemic. She has collaborated with researchers at the University of Massachusetts Amherst to analyze trends in flu-like illnesses that were not influenza and, in March, found some unusual activity that may correspond to incidence of COVID-19. The study concluded that further research was necessary to determine whether the data was indeed a signal that SARS-CoV-2 was causing widespread disease in the United States. She also analyzed syndromic surveillance data from outbreaks in Taiwan, Hong Kong, and Singapore and found the containment measures they were taking were actually effective at "flattening the curve" of transmission and reducing infections.

In March 2020, she co-authored a policy proposal through the American Enterprise Institute, along with former FDA commissioners Scott Gottlieb and Mark McClellan, former FDA chief of staff Lauren Silvis, and public health expert Crystal Watson, with a step-by-step timeline on how to safely ease restrictions in the wake of the COVID-19 pandemic. The plan outlines four phases, with triggers to move from one phase to the next, build on an epidemiology evidence base. In an op-ed that preceded the policy proposal, Gottlieb and Rivers argued that quarantining entire cities is unnecessary; instead, government officials should focus on well-coordinated mitigation measures across the country to reduce community spread. Part of these mitigation measures also include providing relief for those who will be economically impacted by closures and medical costs.

== Open science ==
Rivers is an advocate for the open science movement, particularly as it relates to matters of public health and health security. When she began modeling the Ebola virus disease epidemic in 2014, she converted data released by ministries of health into a machine-readable format and shared it openly on GitHub, an open repository for collaborative work on software and code. In the wake of the Zika virus outbreak, she co-authored a perspective piece on the importance of making data sharing the norm in order to maximize readiness for public health emergencies, outlining challenges, such as the need for data standards for sharing, and potential solutions. She has also worked to develop an ethical framework of research standards for analyzing and reporting on publicly available data, with a specific focus on data resulting from Twitter.

== Awards and honors ==
- 2013–2015: United States Department of Defense, Science, Mathematics, And Research For Transformation (SMART) Defense Scholarship Program, Scholar
- 2015: Center for Health Security, Emerging Leaders in Biosecurity Fellowship

== Selected works and publications ==
- Rivers, Caitlin M.; Lofgren, Eric T.; Marathe, Madhav; Eubank, Stephen; Lewis, Bryan L. (2014). "Modeling the Impact of Interventions on an Epidemic of Ebola in Sierra Leone and Liberia". PLOS Currents. 6. arXiv:1409.4607. doi:10.1371/currents.outbreaks.4d41fe5d6c05e9df30ddce33c66d084c. PMC 4325479. PMID 25685630. Wikidata ()
- Young, Sean D.; Rivers, Caitlin; Lewis, Bryan (June 2014). "Methods of using real-time social media technologies for detection and remote monitoring of HIV outcomes". Preventive Medicine. 63: 112–115. doi:10.1016/j.ypmed.2014.01.024. PMC 4031268. PMID 24513169. Wikidata ()
- Rivers, Caitlin M. (March 16, 2015). Modeling of Emerging Infectious Diseases for Public Health Decision Support (Doctor of Philosophy in Genetics, Bioinformatics and Computational Biology thesis). Blacksburg, VA: Virginia Polytechnic Institute and State University. hdl:10919/52023.
- Alexander, Kathleen A.; Sanderson, Claire E.; Marathe, Madav; Lewis, Bryan L.; Rivers, Caitlin M.; Shaman, Jeffrey; Drake, John M.; Lofgren, Eric; Dato, Virginia M.; Eisenberg, Marisa C.; Eubank, Stephen; Akogun, Oladele B. (June 4, 2015). "What Factors Might Have Led to the Emergence of Ebola in West Africa?". PLOS Neglected Tropical Diseases. 9 (6) e0003652. doi:10.1371/journal.pntd.0003652. PMC 4456362. PMID 26042592. Wikidata ()
- Chretien, Jean-Paul; Rivers, Caitlin M.; Johansson, Michael A. (August 16, 2016). "Make Data Sharing Routine to Prepare for Public Health Emergencies". PLOS Medicine. 13 (8) e1002109. doi:10.1371/journal.pmed.1002109. PMC 4987038. PMID 27529422. Wikidata ()
- Rivers, Caitlin M.; Majumder, Maimuna S.; Lofgren, Eric T. (September 15, 2016). "Risks of Death and Severe Disease in Patients With Middle East Respiratory Syndrome Coronavirus, 2012–2015". American Journal of Epidemiology. 184 (6): 460–464. doi:10.1093/aje/kww013. PMC 5023790. PMID 27608662. Wikidata ()
- Rivers, Caitlin M.; Scarpino, Samuel V. (July 25, 2018). "Modelling the trajectory of disease outbreaks works". Nature. 559 (7715): 477. Bibcode:2018Natur.559R.477R. doi:10.1038/d41586-018-05798-3. PMID 30042542. Wikidata ()
- Inglesby, Thomas; Cicero, Anita; Rivers, Caitlin; Zhang, Weiwen (September 2019). "Biosafety and biosecurity in the era of synthetic biology: Meeting the challenges in China and the U.S." Journal of Biosafety and Biosecurity. 1 (2): 73–74. doi:10.1016/j.jobb.2019.09.003.
- Lee, Wei-Nchih; Stück, David; Konty, Kevin; Rivers, Caitlin; Brown, Courtney R.; Zbikowski, Susan M.; Foschini, Luca (April 2020). "Large-scale influenza vaccination promotion on a mobile app platform: A randomized controlled trial". Vaccine. 38 (18): 3508–3514. doi:10.1016/j.vaccine.2019.11.053. PMID 31787410.
- Watson, Crystal; Cicero, Anita; Blumenstock, James; Fraser, Michael (April 10, 2020). A National Plan to Enable Comprehensive COVID-19 Case Finding and Contact Tracing in the US (PDF). Baltimore: The Johns Hopkins Center for Health Security. Archived from the original (PDF) on April 22, 2020.
- Rivers, Caitlin; Martin, Elena; Watson, Crystal; Schoch-Spana, Monica; Mullen, Lucia; Sel, Tara Kirk; Gottlieb, Scott; Warmbrod, Kelsey Lane; Hosangadi, Divya; Kobokovich, Amanda; Potter, Christina; Cicero, Anita; Inglesby, Tom (April 17, 2020). Public Health Principles for a Phased Reopening During COVID-19: Guidance for Governors (PDF). Baltimore: The Johns Hopkins Center for Health Security. Archived from the original (PDF) on April 22, 2020.
