= Crystal Watson =

American coronavirus researcher

Crystal R. Watson
- Born: Crystal R. Boddie; April 9, 1983 (age 43); Denver, Colorado
- Other name: Crystal Franco
- Education: University of Colorado Boulder, BA (2004); Johns Hopkins Bloomberg School of Public Health, MPH (2009), DrPH (2017)
- Spouse: Matthew Watson
- Scientific career
- Fields: Health Security, Emerging Infectious Diseases
- Workplaces: Johns Hopkins Center for Health Security
- Thesis: Risk-Based Decision Making During Public Health Emergencies Involving Environmental Contamination (2017)
- Doctoral advisor: Mary A. Fox

Crystal Watson (née Boddie, born April 9, 1983) is a senior scholar at the Johns Hopkins Center for Health Security and an associate professor in the Department of Environmental Health and Engineering. She is an expert in health security, biodefense, and risk assessment and preparedness for emerging infectious diseases. She is currently working on the public health response to the COVID-19 pandemic.

== Education ==
Watson was born and raised in Littleton, Colorado. She attended University of Colorado Boulder, where she received her Bachelor of Arts degree in molecular, cellular, and developmental biology in 2004. She then joined the Johns Hopkins Center for Health Security in 2004. During her tenure, she has received her Master of Public Health degree from Johns Hopkins Bloomberg School of Public Health in 2009 and her Doctor of Public Health degree in 2017 under the mentorship of Mary A. Fox. Her thesis, entitled Risk-Based Decision Making During Public Health Emergencies Involving Environmental Contamination, centered on developing a framework to guide decision makers as they respond to contamination emergencies.

== Research ==
Since joining the Johns Hopkins Center for Health Security in 2004, Watson has focused her work on public health risk assessment, biodefense, and emerging infectious diseases preparedness and response. She is currently the associate editor of the Health Security journal. Early in her career, she worked on evaluating medical care in the wake of disasters. Following Hurricane Katrina, she analyzed the medical response and proposing policy changes to improve the capacity of the healthcare system to respond to mass casualty events. She has since analyzed the public health response to a number of other outbreaks and health emergencies, including Dengue fever, Zika fever, and Ebola virus disease.

From 2012 to 2013, she served with the United States Department of Homeland Security, where she worked as a program manager for the Integrated Terrorism Risk Assessment (ITRA) program. She also worked to assess the Strategic National Stockpile, the United States' repository of antibiotics, vaccines, and other critical supplies needed to address chemical and biological threats.

=== Federal Budget for Health Security Analysis ===
Watson is also a budget expert, analyzing the impact of proposed Federal budgets on public health preparedness and health security capacity. She has been critical of proposed Presidential budgets that have reduced the ability of public health officials to effectively respond to health emergencies. In 2012, she noted a proposed $47 million cut to the Strategic National Stockpile, which would critically limit the nation's capability of combatting infectious disease threats. In 2017, she noted Donald Trump's proposed 2018 budget would make the United States vulnerable to bioterrorism with cuts to the Centers for Disease Control and Prevention' (CDC) preparedness and response capability and the elimination of the DHS's National Biodefense Analysis and Countermeasures Center, a national biodefense research laboratory.

=== COVID-19 Work ===
Early in the COVID-19 pandemic in the United States, Watson warned that the downward trend of federal funding for state and local officials to prepare and respond to health emergencies would strain the healthcare system as the outbreak progressed. In February 2020, she flagged a number of funding cuts to public health preparedness programs that would help the country combat the COVID-19 pandemic. Among the funding cuts, she noted a $25 million reduction to the CDC's public health preparedness and response programs, as well as an $18 million reduction in funding for the Hospital Preparedness Program, which grants support for public health emergencies, such as the COVID-19 pandemic.

In March 2020, she co-authored a policy proposal through the American Enterprise Institute—along with former FDA commissioners Scott Gottlieb and Mark McClellan, former FDA Chief of Staff Lauren Silvis, and epidemiologist Caitlin Rivers—with a step-by-step timeline on how to safely ease restrictions in the wake of the COVID-19 pandemic. The plan outlines a phased reopening of the country that would mitigate the spread of the disease without having to lock down the country. She has cautioned against easing social distancing measures too early, as those who have been infected may remain asymptomatic while still shedding infectious virus.

Watson was also a lead author on an April 2020 report from Johns Hopkins Bloomberg School of Public Health and Association of State and Territorial Health Officials that outlined a national plan to enable comprehensive contact tracing to identify COVID-19 cases and their close contacts. She has suggested training those who were recently unemployed to become contact tracers and contribute to the mass effort. She has also noted that contact tracing efforts can leverage technologies like Bluetooth that can identify close contact with those infected with COVID-19 while still preserving privacy.

== Selected publications ==
- Watson, Crystal; Cicero, Anita; Blumenstock, James; Fraser, Michael (April 10, 2020). A National Plan to Enable Comprehensive COVID-19 Case Finding and Contact Tracing in the US (PDF) (Report). The Johns Hopkins Center for Health Security. Archived from the original (PDF) on April 22, 2020.
- Gottlieb, Scott; Rivers, Caitlin; McClellan, Mark; Lauren, Silvis; Watson, Crystal (March 29, 2020). National coronavirus response: A road map to reopening (Report).
- Watson, Crystal R.; Watson, Matthew; Sell, Tara Kirk (September 11, 2017). "Public Health Preparedness Funding: Key Programs and Trends From 2001 to 2017". American Journal of Public Health. 107 (S2): S165–S167. doi:10.2105/AJPH.2017.303963. PMC 5594397. PMID 28892451.
- (Boddie) Watson, Crystal; Watson, Matthew; Ackerman, Gary; Kwik Gronvall, Gigi (August 21, 2015). "Assessing the bioweapons threat". Science. 349 (6250): 792–793. doi:10.1126/science.aab0713. PMID 26293941. S2CID 206637099.
- Adalja, Amesh A.; Sell, Tara Kirk; Bouri, Nidhi; (Franco) Watson, Crystal (2012). "Lessons Learned during Dengue Outbreaks in the United States, 2001–2011". Emerging Infectious Diseases. 18 (4): 608–614. doi:10.3201/eid1804.110968. PMC 3309700. PMID 22469195.
