= Health security =

Public health via the actions of sovereign states

President Obama speaking at the Global Health Security Agenda Summit held in 2016 after an outbreak of Ebola in Africa

Health security is a concept that encompasses activities and measures across sovereign boundaries that mitigate public health incidents to ensure the health of populations. It is an evolving paradigm within the fields of international relations and security studies. Proponents of health security posit that all states have a responsibility to protect the health and wellbeing of their populations. Opponents suggest health security impacts civil liberties and the equal distribution of resources.

According to the World Health Organization (WHO), health security encompasses the "activities required to minimise the danger and impact of acute public health events that endanger the collective health of populations living across geographical regions and international boundaries". It is the responsibility of governments globally to protect the health of their populations.

The advent of new security challenges, resulting from increasing global vulnerability to infectious diseases has created demand for greater global commitment and collaboration towards public health. Globalisation, and the advent of transnational concerns regarding the spread of infectious disease, have become integral to national and international security agendas. Disease, pandemics, and epidemics have become of increasing concern for global policymakers and governments, requiring mobilisation of essential resources for the implementation of rapid and effective health procedures. The WHO, and initiatives such as the Global Health Security Agenda are central to advocacy of health security – aiming to improve detection, prevention, and response to infectious disease through public health surveillance and partnerships between states.

Health security is a concept or framework for public health issues which includes protection of national populations from external health threats such as pandemics.

Four types of security may be considered in this context: biosecurity; global health security; human security; and national security.

== Origins ==
The WHO Constitution states that "the health of all peoples is fundamental to the attainment of peace and security and is dependent upon the fullest co-operation of individuals and States". Prevalence of biosecurity threats, both naturally occurring and intentional acts of bioterrorism, have resulted in the emergence of health security agendas globally. The occurrence and threat of infectious diseases has increased partially because of the advent of global aviation and the shifting nature of human society. Transnational diffusion of diseases may have created many global health insecurities.

The prevalence of disease outbreaks and increased transnational spread of disease in the twentieth century required policymakers to consider new security frameworks. The global spread of HIV/AIDS in the 1980s provoked political responses, prompting the United Nations Security Council to consider disease as a threat to international security. In 2001, World Health Assembly Resolution 54.14 determined health security as a strategy for the prevention of the spread of diseases across national borders.

Contemporary security agendas have expanded from traditional security concerns, such as terrorism, war, and weapons of mass destruction, to biological threats. Whereas traditional approaches to security regard the State as the referent object of analysis, the development of human security highlights the need to include economic, personal, community, political, food, and health insecurities. Health security is essential to achieving human security.

Not all health issues are considered threats to national security. Health security focusses on pandemics, epidemics, and the spread of infectious disease. Infectious diseases are the most significant threat to public health. Diseases have the capacity to cause high levels of morbidity and mortality, incite societal fear and disruption, and provoke economic shocks. The emergence of new and recurring infectious diseases, including the 2002–2003 SARS coronavirus novel and the 2009 influenza A (H1N1) virus, pose considerable threat to the global population. The rapid, worldwide spread of microbial pathogens has increased demand for strategic health security policies. The expansion of global aviation networks has increased the speed, rate, and volume of connections between nations, increasing the risk of the spread of infectious disease. Conventional measures of disease control are no longer viable to mitigate threats to public health.

== Role of organisations ==
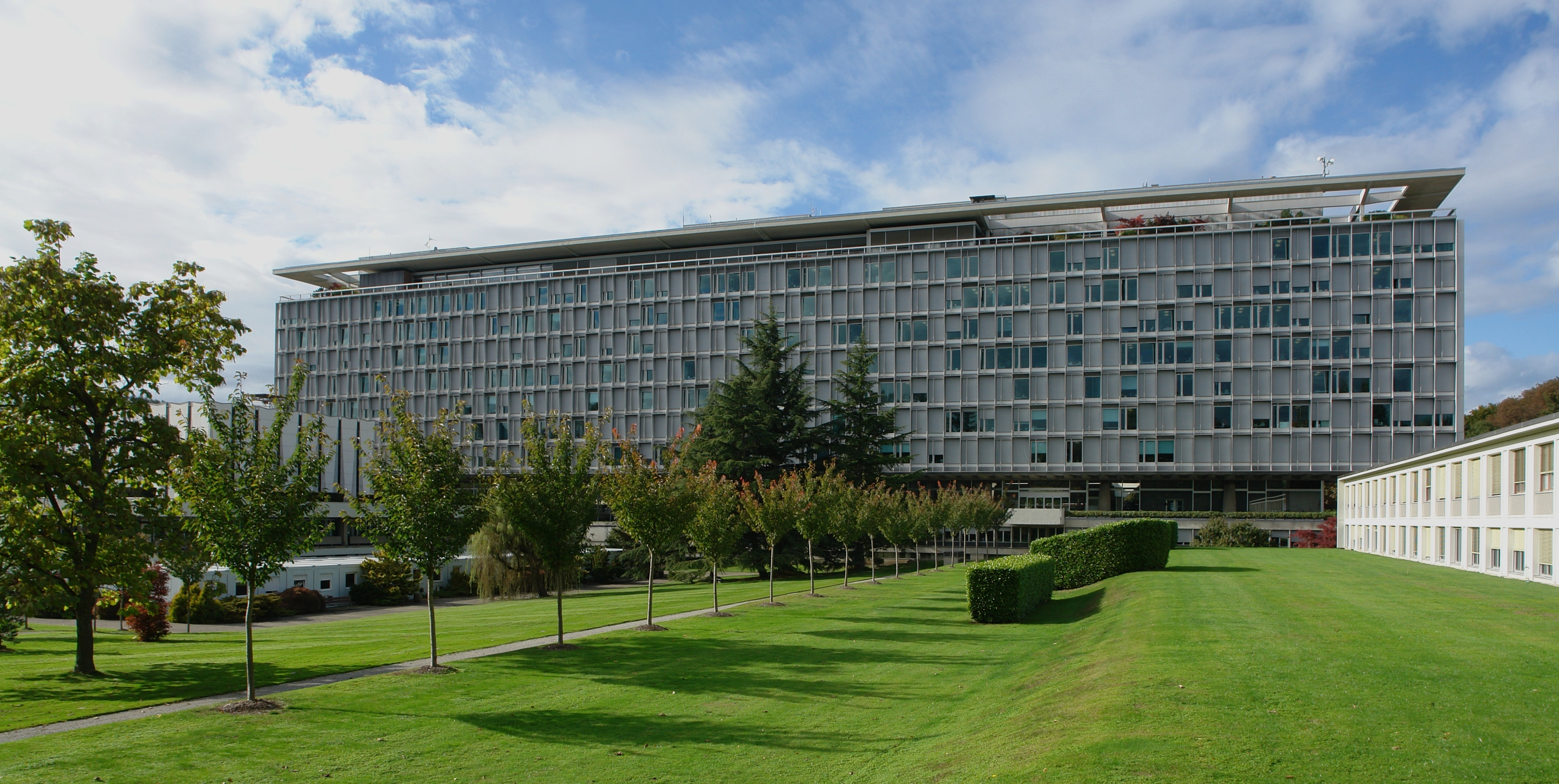
World Health Organization headquarters, Switzerland

=== World Health Organization (WHO) ===
The creation of the WHO in 1948 recognised the severity of epidemiological events in the wake of the 1918 Spanish Influenza. During WWII, the security implications of major epidemic events, including malaria, cholera, yellow fever, typhoid, and typhus, demonstrated the need to establish an institution to mitigate threats to human life and the subsequent economic impacts of such events. The WHO was imbued with the constitutional authority to combat pandemics and epidemics.

The WHO has an official role in the guidance and prevention policy of global disease. It acts as intermediary between states to ensure the safety of populations through collective health action. The WHO oversees the prevention, control, and resolution of infectious disease, assisting governments globally. It has a coordinating role and the authority to direct international health activities to manage infectious disease outbreaks and health security.

The WHO's 2005 International Health Regulations (IHR) established standards for the detection and response to international disease outbreak. The 194 countries that are WHO signatories are bound by the IHR, implemented to aid in the prevention and response to public health threats. Signatories are required to report public health events that might pose threat to the international population within 24 hours of detection. Enhanced disease surveillance technologies have enabled effective and timely detection and response to public health events.

=== Global Health Security Agenda (GHSA) ===
The GHSA was implemented in 2014, in response to the growing threat of Ebola, to increase capacities for the detection, prevention, and response to naturally, accidentally, or deliberately occurring infectious diseases. The agenda is the combined effort of 67 nations, the WHO, the World Organisation for Animal Health (OIE), and the United Nations Food and Agriculture Organisation (FAO). The combination of nations, NGOs, international organisations, and private sector companies has been developed to advance global security to infectious disease. Nations are committed to elevating global health security as a national security priority.

The GHSA has committed to ensuring adequate preparation for pandemics and epidemics. The Agenda helps nations identify the strengths and weaknesses of domestic and international health systems, ensuring that assistance is directed where necessary. The 2020 COVID-19 pandemic has demonstrated need for coordinated international response to ensure preparedness of governments to protect public health.

=== Global Health Security Initiative (GHSI) ===
The GHSI was established to contest the increased threat of bioterrorism. The initiative expanded to consider pandemic threats and the prevention of the spread of infectious disease. In 2001, the GHSI became an informal, international partnership between nations committed to strengthening public health preparedness and response to global health threats. Pandemic, biological, chemical, and radio-nuclear threats were regarded as important to global health security. It was founded on the basis of exchanging information between nations and coordinating practices to respond to potential bioterrorism threats.

== Policy and responses ==
Securitising global health includes resolving forms of insecurity that enable the spread of disease. Public health crises and inadequate health systems have the potential to undermine the global economy and global security. Resilience to health insecurities caused by changing patterns of infectious disease is integral to national security agendas. Understanding vulnerabilities enables policymakers to identify and target health insecurities to prevent or treat the spread of infectious disease. Health security encompasses the activities and responses of nations to public health threats. Access to health care, access to preventative medicine, vaccination programs, and epidemic control are part of deliberate health security strategies. Preparedness to respond to public health crises relies on assessments and improvements to plans, training, gap analysis, and communication strategies. Public health surveillance activities includes collection, analysis and interpretation of health data for the purpose of improving public health systems. Surveillance of public health incidents enables improved detection and prevention of infectious disease outbreaks. Health security has become a tool utilised by the WHO, policymakers, academics, and health professionals to promote healthcare expenditure, health system strengthening, health surveillance, and cooperation between stakeholders.

The development of health security has emphasised the need to improve national health systems to control and reduce threats. Developing countries have implemented strategies to strengthen health systems to ensure equitable advances in health provision and outcomes. Securitising health enables policymakers to focus additional resources on the development of health services. Improving health security of populations will have subsequent effects on economic and national stability.

Nations adapt to changing health threats affecting their populations. Risk of antimicrobial drug resistance will impact how governments choose to treat and manage diseases and infections. Dominance of the pharmaceutical industry in the development of medicines has significantly impeded governments' attempts to obtain pharmaceutical defences for health security.

Global health security encourages transnational partnerships to synthesise support and mobilisation between governments and relevant stakeholders in public health. Global partnerships facilitate the effective implementation and practice of global health regulations. Advocates of universal health care have suggested that improved access to enhanced health care would facilitate greater global health security against threats to public health.

== Criticisms ==
The securitisation of public health has been contested by some policymakers and academics. Health security advocates claim that securitisation improves responses to health crises. Securitising public health enables governments to engage necessary resources and practices needed to mitigate infectious diseases and health threats endangering populations.

Critics of health security are concerned with the impact on civil liberties and global equitable distribution. Securitisation of health has increased concerns for human rights, as public health is politicised and militarised. Opposition to the linkage of health and security by governments and public health stakeholders has impacted policy. Health security measures have been criticised for their potential to incite anti-democratic responses to health crises. Social implications of securitising health have been considered by many academics and policymakers. For example, securitising HIV/AIDS patients as a threat to national security rather than the virus creates social implications. The linkage of health and security has the potential to threaten human rights or lead to the prioritisation of some diseases over other health needs.

Opponents to the concept of health security have critiqued the WHO's language. Opposition within the Indo-Pacific region have rejected the terminology 'health security'. Governments in India, Indonesia and Thailand have criticised linkage of health and security discourses. Limited consensus regarding the definition and scope of health security, and the assumption that it focusses predominately on protection of populations in high-income nations motivates this opposition. Health security has been perceived as an opportunity for high-income nations to assert soft power throughout the region through the provision of technical and medical assistance.

Social structures, and the dissemination of neoliberal development policy agendas in developing nations may prevent the securitisation of public health threats. Personal insecurity, food insecurity, deprivation and endemic poverty impede human and health security in developing nations. However, these factors are often not securitised. The prevalence of societal structures and finance institutions determine what health issues are securitised. The dominant realist paradigm of international relations emphasises the structure-agency binaries and institutions of gender, power and the distribution of resources and wealth. As such, health security tends to focus on the threats to public health rather than individual experiences.

== See also ==
- International relations
- Security studies
