= EUPHIX =

The objective of the European Union Public Health Information and Knowledge system (EUPHIX project) is to develop a sustainable system to integrate and present public health information and knowledge for policy makers, academics and public health specialists at a European, national and regional level. Its objectives are to deliver a technical web system, publishing protocols and an expert network, all facilitating the production and regular updates of data presentations and text for the [www.EUPHIX.org] website. It is publicly accessible and has ‘deep links’ to the Public Health-EU portal. It serves as an information & knowledge exchange platform, but also as an example of how public health information can be presented in a dynamic and interactive fashion.

Completed topics are addressed with comprehensive texts & data which have been written and reviewed by public health experts. Technically the system is equipped to present text with interactive links to sources, maps, graphs, tables, detail pages, definitions and other relevant web-pages. The editing process is described in publishing protocols. A growing number of experts are active as authors and reviewers. Reports on broader topics have been developed in collaboration with other EU funded health projects.

The project proved that within a limited amount of time, a totally new communication system for public health knowledge can be established. At this point the number of users is growing. The system shows the feasibility of a system that can be continuously updated and expanded to fulfill urgent policy needs.
