= Atlantic Storm =

Atlantic Storm was a ministerial exercise simulating the top-level response to a bioterror incident. The simulation operated on January 14, 2005, in Washington, D.C. It was created in part to reveal the current international state of preparedness and possible political and public health issues that might evolve from such a crisis.

The project was sponsored by the Alfred P. Sloan Foundation, the German Marshall Fund of the United States, and the Nuclear Threat Initiative. Organization efforts were provided by the Center for Biosecurity of UPMC, the Center for Transatlantic Relations of Johns Hopkins University, and the Transatlantic Biosecurity Network.

== Scenario ==
In the scenario, smallpox was released in the following major cities in a covert attack: Istanbul, Rotterdam, Warsaw, Frankfurt, New York City, and Los Angeles. Cases were initially reported in Germany, Turkey, Sweden, and the Netherlands, but the pathogen was exported to other nations within hours. Specifically, the 51 cases confirmed in these four nations grew to 3,320 cases with transatlantic spread after no more than 4.5 hours. This rapid spread of disease forced the attending representatives to grapple with a quickly escalating crisis and revealed difficult tensions between domestic politics and international relations, revealing the need for improving response systems for such a crisis. The scenario was propelled by continual briefings by "Summit Staff", breaking news segments from the “Global News Network”, and private updates for representatives from their “national advisors”. The scenario assumes that the viral ingredients were obtained from a bioweapons facility in Russia. The terrorist group responsible used publicly available knowledge as well as training in US and Indian universities in order to create the strain of smallpox. To spread the virus, members walked around public areas with canisters releasing the virus in high traffic areas.

== Key participants ==
Participants in the exercise include:

Participant	Role
Barbara McDougall	Prime Minister of Canada
Erika Mann	President of the European Commission
Werner Hoyer	Chancellor of the Federal Republic of Germany
Bernard Kouchner	President of France
Stefano Silvestri	Prime Minister of Italy
Klaas de Vries	Prime Minister of the Netherlands
Jerzy Buzek	Prime Minister of Poland
Jan Eliasson	Prime Minister of Sweden
Madeleine Albright	United States Secretary of State
Sir Nigel Broomfield	Prime Minister of the United Kingdom
Gro Harlem Brundtland	Director General, WHO
Eric Chevallier	Executive Secretary of the Summit
Nik Gowing	Discussion Moderator
Tom Inglesby	Deputy National Security Advisor of the United States
Daniel Hamilton	Director of the Center for Transatlantic Relations
Tara O'Toole	CEO and Director, Center for Biosecurity of UPMC

== Considerations ==
The initial problem facing the participants was whether to use a ring vaccination strategy over a mass vaccination one in order to deal with the small number of those thought to be infected with the smallpox virus. While ring vaccination is recommended for initial control over an outbreak, states may quickly choose to switch to mass vaccination if it is unsuccessful. In addition, the participants for countries with no infected persons faced pressures to share available vaccine resources with countries currently experiencing outbreaks. As more countries began to experience outbreaks, domestic pressures forced participants to withhold the sharing of vaccines in order to preserve their supply for their own citizens. Other strategies, such as vaccine dilution, became necessary as the amount of those suspected to be infected grew. Participants also considered the viability of closing borders to prevent the further spread of the outbreak to their own countries. Certain dire measures, such as the use of military quarantines, were considered as participants also had the obligation to ensure public safety in civilian populations.

== Findings ==
Conclusions from the exercise's published documents:

- "Preparation will matter"
- "Increased knowledge and awareness are essential"
- "Homeland security must look abroad"
- "The World Health Organization’s authority must be aligned with expectations"
- "Effective communication between nations and with the public is critical"
- "Adequate medical countermeasures must be developed"
- "Biosecurity is one of the great global security challenges of the 21st century"

At the end of the exercise, participants were given an opportunity to share insights gained during the scenario. The lack of current international strategy and planning represented a shortfall in bioterrorism protection. In addition, members with defense backgrounds warned against the widespread unawareness that bioterrorism presented to safety at home and abroad. They believed that states without adequate protection would pose a dangerous threat to neighboring states with sufficient resources and infrastructure.

== Recommendations ==
Atlantic Storm highlights the importance of international communication and coordination in responding to a bioterrorist attack. Participants of the exercise indicated that the WHO would be the ideal entity to coordinate an international response. In addition, Atlantic Storm proved that most countries lack the structure and resources to handle such an outbreak. Therefore, the establishment of more resources and infrastructure is a necessity for the success of future response. Next, entities like the EU and NATO should further develop plans of action for bioterror incidents. Strong international coalitions would ensure that response time in an epidemic is not slowed by complications between neighboring countries. Additionally, many politicians are unaware of the threat of bioterrorism and require more information regarding safety and defense implications. Inclusion of knowledgeable defense authorities and scientists would give politicians the capability to form a response. Finally, the international community should do more, as a whole, to bolster developing countries' resources for defending against epidemics.

== Other bioterrorism response exercises ==
Below are further exercises by other organizations with similar scenarios:

- Eurasia Counterterrorism Conference on International Cooperation to Combat Bioterrorism - December 2004
- Interpol Global Conference on Preventing Bioterrorism - March 2005
- Black ICE - September 2005

== Criticisms and weaknesses ==
Some observers raised concerns about the exercise how it was conducted. At the time, the World Health Organization, whom participants indicated to be the ideal response coordinator, lacked the resources and staffing to handle the effort. Finally, leaders in today's world need to possess experience in homeland security and bioterrorist threats in order to handle a situation similar to the scenario proposed in Atlantic Storm. The credentials of some participating members were questioned due to a lack of experience in these fields.

The rate of infection transmission used by the Atlantic storm exercise was higher than historical records of smallpox transmission. As a result, most otherwise appropriate measures would still fail in the hypothetical scenario. This raises some concerns with conclusions of Atlantic Storm and its application to a real world scenario. In addition, some defense research questions the ability of terrorists to create and distribute such a virus.
