= Basic Occupational Health Services =

Application of primary health care principles in occupational health

The Basic Occupational Health Services are an application of the primary health care principles in the sector of occupational health. Primary health care definition can be found in the World Health Organization Alma Ata declaration from the year 1978 as the “essential health care based on practical scientifically sound and socially accepted methods, (…) it is the first level of contact of individuals, the family and community with the national health system bringing health care as close as possible to where people live and work (…)”.

An effort was launched by the International Commission on Occupational Health (ICOH) to develop Basic Occupational Health Services, since occupational health services are available to only 10-15% of workers worldwide. Even where services are available, their quality and relevance may be low. Basic Occupational Health Services are most needed for countries and sectors that do not have services at all or which are seriously underserved.

== Objectives ==
To provide occupational health services for all working people in the world, regardless of mode of employment, size of workplace or geographic location, that is, according to the principle of universal services provision.

== Activities ==
=== Surveillance of work environment and risk assessment ===
The surveillance of the work environment is one of the key activities of Basic Occupational Health Services. It is carried out for the identification of hazardous exposures and other conditions of work, identification of exposed workers and assessment of the levels of exposures for various groups of workers. Surveillance surveys must include the assessment of:

- Ergonomic factors which might affect worker’s health
- Conditions of occupational hygiene and factors such as physical, chemical, biological exposures which may generate risks to the health of workers
- Exposure of workers to adverse psychological factors and aspects of work organization
- Risk of occupational accidents and major hazards
- Collective and personal protective equipment
- Control systems designed to eliminate, prevent or reduce exposure

Information from surveillance of the work environment is combined with information from health surveillance, and other relevant available data are used for risk assessment. It includes:

- Identification of occupational health hazards
- Identification of workers or groups of workers exposed to specific hazards
- Analysis of how the hazard may affect the worker
- Identification of individuals and groups with special vulnerabilities
- Evaluation of available hazard prevention and control measures
- Making conclusions and recommendations for the management and control of risks
- Documenting the findings of the assessment
- Periodic review and, if necessary, reassessment of risks
- The results of risk assessment must be documented

=== Health surveillance and health examinations ===
The surveillance of worker's health is made through various types of health examinations. The main purpose of health examinations is to assess the suitability of a worker to carry out certain jobs, to assess any health impairment which may be related to the exposure to harmful agents inherent in the work process and to identify cases of occupational diseases which may have resulted from exposures at work. The following types of health examinations are carried out either on the basis of regulations or as a part of good occupational health practice:

- Pre-assignment (pre-employment) health examinations
- Periodic health examinations
- Return to work health examinations
- General health examinations
- Health examinations at termination or after ending of service

=== Advice on preventive and control measures ===
Occupational health services should propose appropriate prevention and control measures for the elimination of hazardous exposures and for protecting workers' health. Control measures should be adequate to prevent unnecessary exposure during normal operating conditions, as well as during possible accidents and emergencies. Guidelines for preventive actions for management and control of health and safety hazards and risks:

- Control of hazards at the source
- Ventilation or control technology
- Dust control
- Ergonomic measures
- Use of personal protective equipment
- Regulation of thermal conditions

=== Health education and health promotion, and promotion of work ability ===
Information on identified workplace health hazards and risks must be communicated to the managers responsible for implementing prevention and control measures. To ensure proper understanding and use of information the employer is responsible for education of his or her workers on risks and hazards at work and on their avoidance, prevention and protection, as well as on safe working practices. Such information and education tasks are often delegated to occupational health experts. The information and education include the following aspects:

- The workers have a right to know and get continuously information and training on hazards related to their own work and the workplace.
- Confidential health information of an individual worker is subject to special legislation and practices and to informed consent.

=== Maintaining preparedness for first aid and participation in emergency preparedness ===
The Basic Occupational Health Services personnel need to be able to provide first aid and train the workplace personnel in first aid activities. The role of Basic Occupational Health Services in first aid and emergency preparedness:

- Providing first aid services at the workplace when appropriate
- Introducing and training first aid practices to workers and supervisors
- Maintaining and periodically inspecting the first aid readiness and facilities
- Participating from the health point of view in emergency planning and organising the health elements in emergency response

=== Diagnosis of occupational diseases ===
Many occupational diseases can be diagnosed in the Basic Occupational Health Services service but many of them need to be referred to specialized occupational medicine clinics. In both instances, the diagnostics follows a special scheme:

- Identification of exposure which may cause the disease
- Examination of clinical findings which are known to be associated with the specific exposure
- Exclusion of non-occupational factors as a possible cause of disease
- Statement on occupational disease for worker's compensation
- Proposals for preventive actions to the workplace of the worker in concern
- Notification of occupational diseases to authorities

=== Record keeping ===
As a health service Basic Occupational Health Services have a general obligation to keep record on health services provided to the workers. The record-keeping obligations are:

- General health record if the workers are treated as patients or health service clients
- Data on surveyed, detected and measured occupational exposures and risk assessments which have been made
- Statistics on occupational diseases and injuries
- Data on health examinations
- Documents on proposals for preventive and control measures

There is no trade-off between health and productivity at work. A virtuous circle can be established: improved conditions of work will lead to a healthier work force, which will lead to improved productivity, and hence to the opportunity to create a still healthier, more productive workplace. The idea of providing basic occupational health services deserved special attention, as it would provide countries with a practical tool for identifying priorities and pooling scarce resources to develop an integrative and effective occupational health system and services, tailored according to the national conditions and needs of each country.

== Sources ==
- Basic Occupational Health Services: Strategy, Structures, Activities, Resources. Rantanen, J. Helsinki, 2005.
- US Department of Health and Human Services, Federal Occupational Health. Basic Occupational Health Center Services. Available from https://web.archive.org/web/20090508223942/http://www.foh.dhhs.gov/library/factsheets/BOHCS.pdf
