= Mark Dredze =

American computer scientist

Mark Harel Dredze is the John C. Malone Professor of Computer Science at Johns Hopkins University. His research focuses on artificial intelligence, natural language processing, machine learning, and their applications in public health, medicine, and social media.

== Education and career ==
Dredze obtained dual B.S. degrees in Computer Science and Computer Engineering with a minor in Psychology from Northwestern University in 2003. He earned an M.A. in Modern Jewish History from Yeshiva University in 2004. He obtained is Ph.D. in Computer and Information Science from the University of Pennsylvania in 2009. His thesis was supervised by Fernando Pereira.

Dredze became a professor at the department of computer science at Johns Hopkins University since 2009. Since 2025, he serves as director of the Johns Hopkins Data Science and AI Institute and associate head of research and strategic initiatives in the Department of Computer Science. He is affiliated with the Center for Language and Speech Processing, the Malone Center for Engineering in Healthcare, and the Human Language Technology Center of Excellence. He is also a visiting research scientist at Bloomberg L.P..

== Research ==
Dredze's research helped establish social media as a valuable data source for health surveillance, particularly through early and influential research such as "You Are What You Tweet," which introduced large-scale analysis of Twitter data for tracking health trends. Notable examples include research on the influence of Internet bots and foreign actors in vaccine misinformation, the detection of shifts in suicidal ideation on social media, and the analysis of mental health signals in Twitter posts, all of which contributed to foundational advances in digital epidemiology. He also co-led a study comparing physician and chatbot responses to patient questions, published in JAMA Internal Medicine, which prompted significant discussion on the use of generative artificial intelligence in clinical communication.

In the field of artificial intelligence, Dredze has developed core techniques in domain adaptation, as well as methods for information extraction, research tools for processing social media data, and the development of AI guardrail systems to specific domains, such as finance. His work also addresses ethical challenges associated with large language models. He was a co-author of BloombergGPT, a domain-specific large language model designed for financial applications.

Dredze's work has been broadly recognized for its impact on both research and real-world practice. His study of suicide-related internet searches following the release of Netflix’s 13 Reasons Why received national attention and contributed to the company’s decision to edit the series to remove a graphic suicide scene. In 2019, he received the Ann E. Nolte Writing Award from the Foundation for the Advancement of Health Education for his paper "Weaponized Health Communication," which demonstrated how foreign actors shaped the vaccine debate in the United States. His research has been featured in major media outlets including The New York Times, NPR, and CNN.

== Honors and awards ==
In 2024, Dredze received the Optum Research Award.
