= GHSI =

GHSI may refer to:

- Global Health Security Initiative, an informal international partnership coordinating to confront new threats and risks to global health
- Global Health Security Index, an assessment of global health security capabilities in 195 countries
