= Health Threat Unit =

The Health Threat Unit of the Directorate-General for Health and Consumer Protection (European Commission), is responsible for terrorism surveillance and early warning of biological, chemical, and radiological threats within the European Union. The Health Threat Unit runs the Rapid Alert System, which conducts surveillance on communicable diseases and diseases caused by acts of bioterrorism. The surveillance data are coordinated and evaluated by the Health Emergency Operations Facility. Health threat information and warnings are sent to the member states by the Communication and Crisis Center (BICHAT) and the Security Office in Brussels, Belgium.

== Criteria for notification ==
The BICHAT sends a warning to the EU member states, within one hour of receiving a warning, when there is:

- Suspicion of danger
- Internationally relevant events; need for a complex response
- Need for coordination (investigative and control actions)
- Suspicion of deliberate action of a terrorist organization
- Risk of trans-frontier spread of the agent/event
- Need for assistance from other countries

== Other responsibilities ==
Besides bioterrorism, the Health Threat Unit also has responsibility for other reportable diseases:

- Diseases preventable by vaccination
- Sexually transmitted diseases
- Viral hepatitis
- Food- and water-borne diseases and diseases of environmental origin
- Air-borne diseases
- Zoonotic diseases
- Diseases transmitted by non-conventional agents
- Serious imported diseases
- Special Health Issues (nosocomial infections; antimicrobial resistance)

== Working groups ==
Within the Health Threat Unit, there are seven working groups responsible for various aspects of bio-defense:

- Preparedness and response planning
- Chemical threats
- Prudent use of antimicrobial agents in human medicine
- Incident investigation and sampling
- Medicinal products
- Co-operation between laboratories
- Risk communication

== See also ==
- Global Health Security Initiative (GHSI)
- Council of Europe Convention on the Prevention of Terrorism
- European BioSafety Association (EBSA)
- European Centre for Disease Prevention and Control (ECDC)
- European program for intervention epidemiology training (EPIET)
- Health-EU portal
- Health Emergency Preparedness and Response Authority (HERA)

== Sources ==
- Threats to health (European Union)
