= Tom Inglesby =

American epidemiologist

Academic background
- Education: BA, 1988, Georgetown University; M.D., 1992, Columbia University Vagelos College of Physicians and Surgeons

Academic work
- Institutions: Johns Hopkins Center for Health Security; University of Pittsburgh School of Medicine

Thomas Vincent Inglesby Jr. is an American epidemiologist. He is the Director of the Johns Hopkins Center for Health Security at the Johns Hopkins Bloomberg School of Public Health.

== Early life and education ==
Inglesby earned his Bachelor of Arts degree from Georgetown University in 1988 and his medical degree from Columbia University Vagelos College of Physicians and Surgeons in 1992. He then completed his residency and fellowship in infectious diseases at Johns Hopkins School of Medicine.

== Career ==
Following his residency and fellowship, Inglesby became an assistant professor in the Department of Medicine at the Johns Hopkins University School of Medicine. While serving in this role, he helped establish the first academic center devoted to biodefense alongside Tara O'Toole and was a principal designer, author, and controller of the Operation Dark Winter Later, he was also promoted from senior fellow to deputy-director of the Johns Hopkins Center for Civilian Biodefense Studies. In 2003, he joined the University of Pittsburgh School of Medicine as an associate professor. Upon joining Pitt Med, Inglesby and O'Toole helped launch and direct the Center for Biosecurity of UPMC. In 2009, Inglesby replaced O'Toole as director and chief executive officer of the center.

In 2020, Inglesby was recognized as being amongst the 50 most influential clinical executives by Modern Healthcare. During the COVID-19 pandemic, Inglesby provided technical guidance to response efforts at the global, federal, state, and local level. He served as a consultant for Larry Hogan, the Governor of Maryland and sat on the COVID Collaborative’s National Advisory Council and on the National Commission on COVID-19 and Criminal Justice.

== Personal life ==
Inglesby is married to Lynn and they have three children together.
