= Operation Dark Winter =

2001 U.S. bio-terrorist attack simulation

- Location: Andrews Air Force Base, Maryland, U.S.
- Date: June 22, 2001 – June 23, 2001

Operation Dark Winter was the code name for a senior-level bio-terrorist attack simulation conducted on June 22–23, 2001. It was designed to carry out a mock version of a covert and widespread smallpox attack on the United States. Tara O'Toole and Tom Inglesby of the Johns Hopkins Center for Civilian Biodefense Strategies (CCBS) / Center for Strategic and International Studies (CSIS), and Randy Larsen and Mark DeMier of Analytic Services were the principal designers, authors, and controllers of the Dark Winter project.

== Overview ==
=== Objective ===
Dark Winter was focused on evaluating the inadequacies of a national emergency response during the use of a biological weapon against the American populace. The exercise was intended to establish preventive measures and response strategies by increasing governmental and public awareness of the magnitude and potential of such a threat posed by biological weapons.

=== Scenario ===
Dark Winter's simulated scenario involved an initial localized smallpox attack on Oklahoma City, Oklahoma, with additional smallpox attack cases in Georgia and Pennsylvania. The simulation was then designed to spiral out of control, and to be an inherently unwinnable scenario. This would create a contingency in which the National Security Council struggles to determine both the origin of the attack as well as deal with containing the spreading virus. By not being able to keep pace with the disease's rate of spread, a new catastrophic contingency emerges in which massive civilian casualties would overwhelm America's emergency response capabilities.

The disastrous contingencies that would result in the massive loss of civilian life were used to exploit the weaknesses of the U.S. health care infrastructure and its inability to handle such a threat. The contingencies were also meant to address the widespread panic that would emerge and which would result in mass social breakdown and mob violence. Exploits would also include the many difficulties that the media would face when providing American citizens with the necessary information regarding safety procedures. Discussing the outcome of Dark Winter, Bryan Walsh noted "The timing--just a few months before the 9/11 attack--was eerily prescient, as if the organizers had foreseen how the threat of terrorism, including bioterrorism, would come to consume the U.S. government and public in the years to come." The bioterrorism exercise has since become a perfect example of how things will unfold for the US in the outbreak of a deadly pandemic. Regularly cited by policymakers in Washington it perfectly showcases the potential social collapse of the world’s most powerful system.

== Summary of findings ==
According to UPMC's Center for Health Security, Dark Winter outlined several key findings with respect to the United States healthcare system's ability to respond to a localized bioterrorism event:

An attack on the United States with biological weapons could threaten vital national security interests.

In addition to the possibility of massive civilian casualties, Dark Winter outlined the possible breakdown in essential institutions, resulting in a loss of confidence in government, followed by civil disorder, and a violation of democratic processes by authorities attempting to restore order. Shortages of vaccines and other drugs affected the response available to contain the epidemic, as well as the ability of political leaders to offer reassurance to the American people. This led to great public anxiety and flight by people desperate to get vaccinated, and it had a significant effect on the decisions taken by the political leadership. In addition, Dark Winter revealed that a catastrophic biowarfare event in the United States would lead to considerably reduced U.S. strategic flexibility abroad.

Current organizational structures and capabilities are not well suited for the management of a biowarfare attack.

Dark Winter revealed that major "fault lines" exist between different levels of government (federal, state, and local), between government and the private sector, among different institutions and agencies, and within the public and private sector. Leaders are unfamiliar with the character of bioterrorist attacks, available policy options, and their consequences. Federal and state priorities may be unclear, differ, or conflict; authorities may be uncertain; and constitutional issues may arise. For example, state leaders wanted control of decisions regarding the imposition of disease-containment measures (e.g., mandatory vs. voluntary isolation and vaccination), the closure of state borders to all traffic and transportation, and when or whether to close airports. Federal officials, on the other hand, argued that such issues were best decided on a national basis to ensure consistency and to give the President maximum control of military and public-safety assets. Leaders in states most affected by smallpox wanted immediate access to smallpox vaccine for all citizens of their states, but the federal government had to balance these requests against military and other national priorities. State leaders were opposed to federalizing the National Guard, which they were relying on to support logistical and public supply needs, while a number of federal leaders argued that the National Guard should be federalized.

There is no surge capability in the U.S. healthcare and public health systems, or in the pharmaceutical and vaccine industries.

The exercise was designed to simulate a sudden and unexpected biowarfare event for which the United States healthcare system was unprepared. In the absence of sufficient preparation, Dark Winter revealed that the lack of sufficient vaccine or drugs to prevent the spread of disease severely limited management options. Due to the institutionally limited "surge capacity" of the American healthcare system, hospitals quickly became overwhelmed and rendered effectively inoperable by the sudden and continued influx of new cases, exacerbated by patients with common illnesses who feared they might have smallpox, and people who were otherwise healthy but concerned about their possible exposure. The challenges of making correct diagnoses and rationing scarce resources, combined with shortages of health care staff, who were themselves worried about becoming infected or bringing infection home to their families, imposed a huge burden on the health care system. The simulation also noted that while demand was highest in cities and states that had been directly attacked, by the time victims became symptomatic, they were geographically dispersed, with some having traveled far from the original attack site.

The simulation also found that without sufficient surge capability, public health agencies' analysis of the scope, source, and progress of the epidemic was greatly impeded, as was their ability to educate and reassure the public, and their capacity to limit casualties and the spread of disease. For example, even after the smallpox attack was recognized, decisionmakers were confronted with many uncertainties and wanted information that was not immediately available. (In fact, they were given more information on locations and numbers of infected people than would likely be available in reality.) Without accurate and timely information, participants found it difficult to quickly identify the locations of the original attacks; to immediately predict the likely size of the epidemic on the basis of initial cases; to know how many people were exposed; to find out how many were hospitalized and where; or to keep track of how many had been vaccinated.

Dealing with the media will be an immediate challenge for all levels of government.

Dark Winter revealed that information management and communication (e.g., dealing with the press effectively, communication with citizens, maintaining the information flows necessary for command and control at all institutional levels) will be a critical element in crisis/consequence management. Additionally, a predictable 24/7 news cycle quickly developed that focused the nation and the world on the attack and response. For example, participants worried that it would not be possible to forcibly impose vaccination or travel restrictions on large groups of the population without their general cooperation. To gain that cooperation, the President and other leaders in Dark Winter recognized the importance of persuading their constituents that there was fairness in the distribution of vaccine and other scarce resources, that the disease-containment measures were for the general good of society, that all possible measures were being taken to prevent the further spread of the disease, and that the government remained firmly in control despite the expanding epidemic.

Should a contagious bioweapon pathogen be used, containing the spread of disease will present significant ethical, political, cultural, operational, and legal challenges.

In Dark Winter, some members advised the imposition of geographic quarantines around affected areas, but the implications of these measures (e.g., interruption of the normal flow of medicines, food and energy supplies, and other critical needs) were not clearly understood at first. In the end, it is not clear whether such draconian measures would have led to a more effective interruption of disease spread. What's more, allocation of scarce resources necessitated some degree of rationing, creating conflict and significant debate between participants representing competing interests.

== Key participants ==
President	The Hon. Sam Nunn
National Security Advisor	The Hon. David Gergen
Director of Central Intelligence	The Hon. R. James Woolsey, Jr.
Secretary of Defense	The Hon. John P. White
Chairman, Joint Chiefs of Staff	General John Tilelli, USA (Ret.)
Secretary of Health and Human Services	The Hon. Margaret Hamburg
Secretary of State	The Hon. Frank Wisner
Attorney General	The Hon. George Terwilliger
Director, Federal Emergency Management Agency	Mr. Jerome Hauer
Director, Federal Bureau of Investigation	The Hon. William Sessions
Governor of Oklahoma	The Hon. Frank Keating
Correspondent, NBC News	Mr. Jim Miklaszewski
Pentagon Producer, CBS News	Ms. Mary Walsh
Reporter, British Broadcasting Corporation	Ms. Sian Edwards
Reporter, The New York Times	Ms. Judith Miller

== In popular culture ==
- McNab, Andy (2003). Dark Winter. Corgi. ISBN 9780552163583. – A novel inspired by Dark Winter where a weaponised small pox threat threatens European cities.
- Tom Clancy's The Division is based on Operation Dark Winter, making reference to it in the first E3 trailer in 2013. The game focuses on how a fictional outbreak – the Green Poison or "Dollar Flu" – caused by a bioterror attack would spread across the United States and, later, the world, and explored how that would impact American society. The Green Poison was a smallpox-based virus spread on infected banknotes.
- Hayes, Terry (2014). I Am Pilgrim. Corgi. pp. 313–315. ISBN 9781439177723.

== See also ==
- 2001 anthrax attacks
