= Asia Centre for Health Security =

New think tank in Singapore

The Asia Centre for Health Security (abbreviated ACHS) is an academic think tank based at the Saw Swee Hock School of Public Health of the National University of Singapore. The Centre focuses on research to prevent and prepare for biological threats affecting the Asia region. The Center is a joint initiative with the S. Rajaratnam School of International Studies at Nanyang Technological University

== History ==
From 2014-2024 the Johns Hopkins Center for Health Security hosted a series of multilateral dialogues with experts from the Southeast Asia region. This Track II dialogue series promoted collaboration between Southeast Asian nations, with a focus on preparedness and response to natural, accidental, and deliberate biological events and was highlighted in the journal Emerging Infectious Diseases. As a result of these dialogues, ACHS was launched. ACHS's funders include the Singapore Ministry of Health and philanthropic donors. Prof Hsu Li Yang serves as the Centre's founding director.

== Training ==
The Centre offers training opportunities for emerging biosecurity leaders in the Asia region, including a fellowship program launched in 2025.
