= Amesh Adalja =

American infectious disease physician

- Born: Philadelphia, Pennsylvania, US

Academic background
- Education: BS, industrial management, 1995, Carnegie Mellon University; MD, 2002, American University of the Caribbean

Academic work
- Institutions: Johns Hopkins Center for Health Security; University of Pittsburgh Medical Center
- Website: trackingzebra.com

Amesh Adalja is an American infectious disease physician. He specializes in infectious disease, bioterrorism, and emergency medicine at Johns Hopkins Center for Health Security and an attending physician at the University of Pittsburgh School of Medicine.

== Early life and education ==
Adalja was born to physicians and Indian immigrants Ashok Adalja and Varsha Mehta in Philadelphia. His family moved to Butler, Pennsylvania when he was about two years old and remained there throughout his childhood. Growing up, he attended grade school at Butler Catholic before moving onto Butler Area Senior High School where he graduated in 1993. Adalja graduated at age 17 from high school and earned his Bachelor of Science degree in industrial management from Carnegie Mellon University at the age of 19. He then took a finance job in New York City before completing his medical degree from the American University of the Caribbean.

== Career ==
Following a combined internal and emergency medicine residency at Allegheny General Hospital, Adalja completed two fellowships at the University of Pittsburgh Medical Center; one in infectious disease and another in critical care medicine. He was employed there from 2007 to 2017 and remains on staff. During the Western African Ebola virus epidemic, Adalja was an active voice in the media disseminating information in regards to the outbreak. He simultaneously served as a clinical assistant professor in the Department of Critical Care Medicine and in the Department of Emergency Medicine, as well as an adjunct instructor in the Department of Medicine’s Division of Infectious Diseases. As a result of his work, the City of Pittsburgh appointed him to Chair their HIV Commission. Upon joining the Johns Hopkins Center for Health Security, he focused his research on emerging infectious disease, pandemic preparedness, and biosecurity. He participated in the Clade X bioterrorism preparedness exercise in May 2018.

Adalja also became an external advisor to the New York City Health and Hospital emergency management highly infectious disease training program, as well as on a Federal Emergency Management Agency working group on nuclear disaster recovery. As a result of his experience and media outreach, in 2017 he was named by STAT News as one of the "Top 13 Clinicians to Follow on Twitter." Adalja is also a Fellow of the Infectious Diseases Society of America, Fellow of the American College of Physicians, and Fellow of the American College of Emergency Physicians.

Throughout the COVID-19 pandemic, Adalja was an outspoken advocate towards the COVID vaccine and dismantling misinformation. He has served in various roles for the Infectious Diseases Society of America, including as a spokesperson, a member of their public health committee, a member of their diagnostics committee, and as part of their precision medicine working group. Adalja also served as a member of the National Collegiate Athletic Association coronavirus advisory group and an informal advisor to the International Monetary Fund. He was a COVID advisor on the film Borat Subsequent Movie Film and a consultant to multiple organizations and businesses. He also communicates with the public via Twitter and has been named as a key expert to follow for reliable scientific information about the pandemic. In November 2021, Adalja, referring to the COVID-19 pandemic, stated, "We will be living with this virus, there is no covid zero", suggesting that the pandemic may now have become an endemic.
