= Health Emergency Preparedness and Response Authority =

Health agency

Agency overview
- Formed: 16 September 2021
- Jurisdiction: European Union
- Key document: Commission Decision 2021/929

The Health Emergency Preparedness and Response Authority (HERA) is a directorate-general of the European Commission created to prepare the EU for a future pandemic and to avoid the mistakes made during the EU's response to the COVID-19 pandemic. European Commission President Ursula von der Leyen first announced plans for such a body in 2020. On 15 September 2021, the EU announced the launch of HERA and the service was established as a directorate-general of the European Commission on 16 September. HERA has been operational since early 2022.

HERA will assess potential health threats, promote research, ensure the availability of critical production and help build stockpiles. During a health crisis, the authority would activate emergency funding and help coordinate monitoring, acquisition and purchase of medical equipment or treatments.

== See also ==
- Health Threat Unit
- Health Security Committee
