= Tara O'Toole =

American physician

Under Secretary of Homeland Security for Science and Technology
- In office November 4, 2009 – September 23, 2013

Personal details
- Education: Vassar College (AB); George Washington University School of Medicine & Health Sciences (MD); Johns Hopkins Bloomberg School of Public Health (MPH)

Tara O'Toole is an American physician who was the Under Secretary of Homeland Security for Science and Technology from 2009 to 2013. She is currently a senior fellow and executive vice president at In-Q-Tel.

== Background ==
Prior to her confirmation as Under Secretary (November 4, 2009), O'Toole founded, and was chief executive officer and director of, the Center for Biosecurity at the University of Pittsburgh Medical Center. Concurrently, she was a Professor of Medicine and of Public Health at the University of Pittsburgh. She stepped down from her position as Under Secretary on September 23, 2013.

From 2006 to 2007, she chaired the board of the Federation of American Scientists. In 2006, she was appointed to the board of the Google Foundation's International Networked System for Total Early Disease Detection. From 2001 to 2003, she directed the Johns Hopkins Center for Civilian Biodefense Strategies. From 1993 to 1997, she was the Assistant Secretary for Environment Safety and Health in the Department of Energy. From 1984 to 1988, she practiced general internal medicine in community health centers in Baltimore.

== Disaster response exercises ==
O'Toole is best known for her pre-pandemic disaster response exercises. She was a principal author and producer of Dark Winter (2001) and Atlantic Storm (2005), both of which simulated a covert outbreak of smallpox in the United States. Many experts applauded these exercises for publicizing the country's surprising vulnerabilities, including a vaccine shortage. Critics charged that these exercises exaggerated the bioterror threat, leading to "an unnecessary increase in the number of research labs."

In her nomination hearing, O'Toole said that this controversy stemmed from her estimated "secondary transmission rate"; that is, the number of smallpox infections caused as a result of the initial infections. O'Toole claimed that her rate of 10 derived from "the available empirical data" and coincided with data from a 2001 article in the peer-reviewed journal, Nature.

== Education ==
O'Toole holds a bachelor's degree from Vassar College, an MD from George Washington University School of Medicine & Health Sciences, and a Master of Public Health degree from Johns Hopkins Bloomberg School of Public Health. In addition, she finished an internal medicine residency at Yale University and a fellowship in Occupational and Environmental Medicine at Johns Hopkins University.
