= Health-EU portal =

- Website type: Public service portal and institutional information
- Owner: European Union
- Creators: European Commission; Directorate-General for Health and Consumers
- Website: ec.europa.eu/health/index_en.htm
- Commercial: No
- Launched: May 2006

Health-EU portal is an official web portal of the Health and Consumers Directorate-General that facilities the access of public-related health information to European Union citizens.

The main objective of this thematic Portal is to provide European citizens with easy access to comprehensive information on Public Health initiatives and programmes at EU level. The portal is intended to help meet EU objectives in the Public Health field, it is an important instrument to positively influence behaviour and promote the steady improvement of public health in the 27 EU Member States.

== Target audiences ==
The Health-EU portal is directed at those who want to keep informed about issues affecting their health, and at those who wish to keep up to date with policies and decisions taken at European, national and international level. The Portal is also an important source of information for health professionals, administrations, policy makers and stakeholders. It is accessible to everyone, including older people and people with disabilities, as it follows the internationally recognised rules on accessibility. The Portal also provides expert users with access to statistical databases relevant to public health.

== Aims ==
The Portal is an initiative of the Community Public Health Programme 2003-2008 intended to permit greater involvement of individuals, institutions, associations, organisations and bodies in the health sector by facilitating consultation and participation. In this framework, attention is given to the right of the EU population to receive simple, clear and scientifically sound information about measures to protect health and prevent diseases. One of the main aims of the portal is to convey that citizens share responsibility for improving their health. Increased awareness of the different EU activities and programmes relating to Public Health will help the general public contribute to and support them. ^^

== Information available ==
Access to the information needed is possible via a simple theme structure which presents health-related aspects affecting individuals and their environment.

Each theme leads to its related sub-themes - for example My Lifestyle leads to Nutrition – where there is a comprehensive range of information and links to policies and activities in the European Union. National policies on each topic can be found in the Member States dedicated section. Information on contributions to the development of public health issues by European Non Governmental Organisations and International Organisations is also included in a dedicated section. Where available, deep links lead the reader directly to the page on the subject required.

The sections on News, major topical Events occurring across Europe and Press Releases give the opportunity to keep up to date and get involved in major decisions and events in the health field at national, cross border and international level.

The Portal also makes available Legislative acts adopted by the Community Institutions, and EU Publications in order to provide easy access to the objectives of the European Union and the means it deploys to attain them.

== See also ==
- Directorate-General for Health and Consumer Protection (European Commission)
- European Commission
