= Global Health Security Initiative =

- Abbreviation: GHSI
- Formation: 2001; aftermath of 9/11 attacks
- Purpose: "undertake concerted global action to strengthen public health preparedness and response to CBRN threats, as well as pandemic influenza"
- Members: Canada, France, Germany, Italy, Japan, Mexico, United Kingdom, United States, European Commission, World Health Organization
- Website: ghsi.ca

The Global Health Security Initiative (GHSI) is a collaborative effort among several nations and organizations focused on strengthening global health security. Established in response to the 2001 terrorist attacks, its primary goal is to prepare for and address public health risks related biological, chemical, nuclear terrorism, or pandemics. The initiative includes members from North America, Europe, and Asia, with the World Health Organization participating as an observer.

== History ==
The idea on which the Global Health Security Initiative is based was suggested by then US Secretary of Health and Human Services, Tommy Thompson, after the World Trade Center attacks on 11 September 2001. He proposed that countries fighting bioterrorism should collaborate, share information, and coordinate their efforts in order to best protect global health.

GHSI was launched in November 2001 by Canada (who hosted the first meeting in Ottawa), the European Commission, France, Germany, Italy, Japan, Mexico, the United Kingdom, and the United States. The World Health Organization (WHO) would act as observer to the GHSI. The ministers agreed on eight areas in which the partnership could collaborate in order to "strengthen public health preparedness and response to the threat of international biological, chemical and radio-nuclear terrorism."

In December 2002, at a meeting in Mexico City, the Ministers broadened the scope of the mandate to include the public health threat posed by pandemic influenza.

== Aims and scope ==
GHSI states that its mandate is "to undertake concerted global action to strengthen public health preparedness and response to chemical, biological, radiological, and nuclear (CBRN) threats, as well as pandemic influenza," including intentional, accidental, and naturally occurring events.

== Organization ==
The Global Health Security Action Group (GHSAG) is made up of senior officials from each member country. The GHSI Secretariat organises, manages, and administers meetings and committees and sets priorities.

Various technical and scientific working groups focus on specific areas of knowledge. Current working groups include:

- Chemical Events Working Group: focuses on the risk prioritization of chemicals, the identification of research needs and best practices in the area of medical countermeasures, as well as other cross-hazard projects such as early alerting and reporting.
- Biological Working Group: focuses on addressing existing gaps and research and development needs required for GHSI member countries to prepare for and respond to biological threats, excluding pandemic influenza and other respiratory viruses of pandemic potential.
- Laboratory Network: focuses on promoting quality assurance in diagnostics, flexibility and adaptability of techniques and technologies, and addressing issues regarding transport of specimens.
- Radio-Nuclear Threats Working Group: focuses on collaboration with other radiation protection and nuclear safety authorities on emergency preparedness, undertakes projects in areas such as countermeasures and laboratory mapping, and serves as an informal communication network during emergencies.
- Pandemic Influenza Working Group: focuses on sharing and comparing respective national approaches to pandemic preparedness, including vaccine and anti-viral stockpiling and use, surveillance and epidemiology, diagnostics, and public health measures.

== Research ==
GHSI conducts research and collaborates to address global health security concerns. Some of the research GHSI has been involved in includes:

- Research on mass casualties since the release of Opioids: The GHSI participated in research to explore the significant health threats linked to the increasing availability of synthetic opioids. The research highlights the dual risks of these substances contributing to mass casualty incidents, either through unintentional overdose or intentional misuse as weapons. In response to these challenges, the GHSI Chemical Events Working Group organized a workshop in 2018 to evaluate the current state of preparedness for handling large-scale incidents involving Opioids.
- Development of SCRIPT: Screening Categorization Risk Prioritization Tool (SCRIPT) is designed to assess public health risks associated with the release of airborne chemicals.

== See also ==
- Biosecurity
- Bioterrorism
- CBRN defense
- Centers for Disease Control and Prevention (United States)
- Council of Europe Convention on the Prevention of Terrorism
- Emergent virus
- European Centre for Disease Prevention and Control (EU)
- Health Threat Unit (EU)
- Pandemic

== Sources ==
- "About". Global Health Security Initiative.
