= Under Secretary of Homeland Security for Science and Technology =

Senior official in the U.S. Department of Homeland Security

United States Under Secretary of Homeland Security for Science and Technology

- Incumbent; Pedro M. Allende since January 20, 2026
- Constituting instrument: 6 U.S.C. § 113
- Formation: 2003
- Website: Official website

The under secretary of homeland security for science and technology is a senior civilian official in the United States Department of Homeland Security. The under secretary, as head of the Science and Technology Directorate at DHS, is the principal staff assistant and adviser to both the secretary of homeland security and the deputy secretary of homeland security for all DHS technological research.

The under secretary is appointed by the president with consent of the Senate.

== Overview ==
The under secretary of homeland security for science and technology is responsible for scientific and technological research designed to provide new security and resilience innovations.

== Reporting officials ==
Officials reporting to the USHS(S&T) include:

- Deputy Under Secretary of Homeland Security for Science and Technology
- Director of Support to the Homeland Security Enterprise and First Responders
- Director
  - Homeland Security Advanced Research Projects Agency
    - Borders and Maritime Security Division
    - Chemical and Biological Defense Division
    - Cyber Security Division
    - Explosive Division
    - Resilient Systems Division
- Director of CDS Capability Development Support
- Director of Research and Development Partnership

== Budget ==
DHS Science and Technology Budget, FY11-16 ($ in thousands)
| Line Item | FY11 Actual | FY12 Actual | FY13 Actual | FY14 Actual | FY15 Actual | FY16 Request |
|---|---|---|---|---|---|---|
| Management and Administration | 140,918 | 135,000 | 126,519 | 129,000 | 129,993 | 132,115 |
| Acquisition and Operations Support | 47,080 | 54,154 | 45,991 | 41,703 | 41,703 | 47,102 |
| Laboratory Facilities | 140,000 | 176,500 | 158,083 | 547,785 | 434,989 | 133,921 |
| Research, Development, and Innovation | 459,690 | 265,783 | 425,294 | 462,000 | 457,499 | 434,850 |
| University Programs | 39,890 | 36,563 | 38,339 | 39,724 | 39,724 | 31,000 |
| Total Budget | 827,578 | 668,000 | 794,226 | 1,220,212 | 1,103,908 | 778,988 |
