= Health surveillance =

Health surveillance may refer to:

- Public health surveillance
- Workplace health surveillance
- Disease surveillance
