= Council of Europe Convention on the Prevention of Terrorism =

The Council of Europe Convention on the Prevention of Terrorism 2005 (CECPT) is a regional multilateral treaty negotiated under the auspices of the Council of Europe. It was concluded in Warsaw on 16 May 2005. Most notable amongst its provisions are the three new offences which it defines: Public Provocation to Commit a "Terrorist Offence"; Solicitation of Persons to Commit "Terrorist Offences"; and Provision of Training For "Terrorist Offences". Parties are required to establish these offences in their national legal systems. However the obligation only applies in respect of behaviour where there is an international nexus of some sort. A "terrorist offence" is defined as any of the offences defined under the 12 existing international conventions on terrorism presently in force.

== The Incitement Offence ==
The most controversial part of the CECPT is its definition of Public Provocation to Commit a Terrorist Offence. Article 5 of the CECPT defines this as intentionally distributing "a message to the public, with the intent to incite the commission of a 'terrorist offence', where such conduct, whether or not directly advocating terrorist offences, causes a danger that one or more terrorist offences may be committed."

This is the first attempt in an international law context to define "incitement" to terrorism. It is controversial most notably because of the inclusion of “indirect” incitement. The limits of this concept are not defined in the CECPT. Article 12 of the CECPT requires parties to implement, and apply the offence in a way which is compatible with the Right to freedom of Expression as recognised in International Law [See Article 10 of the European Convention of Human Rights, and Article 19 of the UN's International Covenant on Civil and Political Rights ]. There is some evidence that in a purported fulfilment of their obligations under the CECPT, States are going further than the CECPT and the relevant Human Rights principles would require or permit. See for example the British Terrorism Act 2006, section 1.

== Signatures and ratifications ==
The CECPT is open for signature by the member states of the Council of Europe, the European Community, and by non-member states which have participated in its elaboration. It came into force on 1 June 2007 in Albania, Bulgaria, Romania, Russia, Slovakia, and Ukraine; as of July 2016 it has been ratified by 35 states. A further 10 states and the European Union have signed but not ratified the convention.
