= New Hanseatic League =

European economic grouping

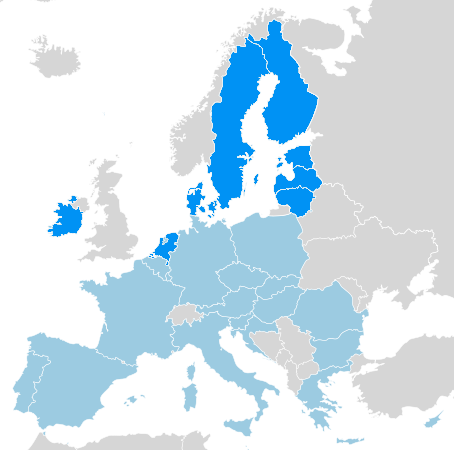
- Map of the European Union in light blue with the members of the New Hanseatic League in dark blue
- Membership: Denmark; Estonia; Finland; Ireland; Latvia; Lithuania; Netherlands; Sweden
- Establishment: February 2018

Area
  - Total: 1,075,220 km^{2} (415,140 sq mi)

Population
  - 2017 estimate: 49,510,438
- GDP (PPP): estimate
  - Total: $2,499 billion

The New Hanseatic League, or the Hansa, also called the Hanseatic League 2.0, was established in February 2018 by European Union finance ministers from Denmark, Estonia, Finland, Ireland, Latvia, Lithuania, the Netherlands and Sweden through the signing of a two-page foundational document that set out the "shared views and values in the discussion on the architecture of the Economic and Monetary Union of the European Union (EMU)". The name is derived from the Hanseatic League, a historical trade alliance.

The grouping sees clubbing together as a way to make up for the loss of the like-minded United Kingdom in the European political arena after Brexit. The countries involved want a more developed European single market, particularly in the services sector (i.e. a so-called 'Capital Markets Union'). They also want to develop the European Stability Mechanism into a full European Monetary Fund that would redistribute wealth from trade surplus to trade deficit EU member states. A number of think tanks – including Free Trade Europa – support this policy approach.

In a speech delivered in the Netherlands, Ireland's Tánaiste Simon Coveney suggested cooperation among the countries in the alliance could extend to foreign policy as well, such as the Middle East peace process and the EU's relations with Africa. Some have expressed fears the New Hanseatic League could exacerbate existing north–south political divides in Europe by grouping northern European countries too closely. A more recent fiscally conservative group of EU nations exists in an informal setting, dubbed the Frugal Four. It consists of some of the New Hanseatic League member states plus Austria.

In November 2018, the New Hanseatic group called for the European Stability Mechanism to be given a greater role in scrutinising state budgets. Under the plan, formal tests of a state government's debt sustainability and ability to repay would be carried out before aid could be provided. The call came after the European Commission's rejection of Italy's 2019 budget, and was signed by all eight members of the League, along with two additional signatures from the Czech Republic and Slovakia.

== See also ==
- Baltic Assembly
- Benelux
- Craiova Group
- EU Med Group
- Frugal Four
- Open Balkan
- Hanseatic League
- Oslo Agreements, 1930
- Three Seas Initiative
- Visegrád Group
