= Oslo Agreements =

Oslo Agreements may refer to:

- Oslo Agreements, 1930, an economic treaty
- Oslo Accords, agreement between Israel and the Palestinians
