= Eurobond =

Eurobond may refer to:

- Eurobond (external bond), a bond issued that is denominated in a currency not native to the country where it is issued
- Eurobond (eurozone), proposed government bonds to be issued in euros jointly by the EU’s 19 eurozone states
