= Dutch–Scandinavian Economic Pact =

1930 multilateral economic agreement

The Dutch–Scandinavian Economic Pact of 30 September 1930 was an economic agreement between the governments of the Netherlands, Denmark, Norway and Sweden. The agreement was designed to coordinate tariff policies and promote trade. The pact was a reaction on the growing economic crisis of the early 1930s.

== See also ==
- Great Depression
- Oslo Agreements (1930)

== Sources ==
- Nordic Trade Policy in the 1930s
- Barry Eichengreena and Douglas A. Irwin, Trade blocs, currency blocs and the reorientation of world trade in the 1930s, Journal of International Economics, Volume 38, Issues 1–2, February 1995, Pages 1–24
