= Ouchy Convention =

1932 agreement between Belgium, Luxembourg and the Netherlands

The Ouchy Convention was negotiated at Ouchy (Switzerland) in June 1932, but signed at Geneva on 18 July 1932 between the two BLEU countries (Belgium and Luxembourg) and the Netherlands. At the convention the three countries agreed to a gradual reduction of economic barriers and the creation of a customs union. The convention was based on the Oslo Agreements of 1930 and aimed in addition at the reduction of trade tariffs.

The three countries agreed that:

- There should be no increases in existing trade tariffs or the application of new tariffs on imports from the participating countries.
- The existing duties on imports from each country should be gradually reduced by 10 per cent each year until the total reduction would reach 50 per cent.
- There should be no new barriers other than import duties on imports from each other
- There should be open entry to the convention on the part of other countries and extension of its benefits to non-entering countries if they in fact carried out its terms.

== Most-favoured-nation problem ==
Both Belgium and the Netherlands had commercial treaties which contained the most-favoured-nation clause with for instance the United Kingdom and other countries. The Ouchy Convention contained a clause that it should not come into effect until these countries had waived their rights. At the British Empire Economic Conference at Ottawa of July–August 1932 the United Kingdom opposed the Dutch–Belgian interpretation of the most-favoured nation clause of the Ouchy convention. The refusal of the United Kingdom to waive its rights as most-favoured nation and the fact that the United States made no reply to the request for a waiver, made the convention fail without ever coming into operation.

The convention would be revived by the end of World War II by the creation of the BeNeLux. It would also be an inspiration for the BeNeLux memorandum of 1955, which was presented at the Messina Conference of 1955.

== See also ==
Ventotene Manifesto

== Sources ==
- Oral History Interview with Baron Jean-Charles Snoy
- Ethel B. Dietrich, Foreign Trade Blocs, Annals of the American Academy of Political and Social Science, Vol. 211, Our Foreign Commerce in Peace and War (Sep., 1940), pp. 85–91
- Robert E. Clute, Robert R. Wilson, The Commonwealth and Favored-Nation Usage, The American Journal of International Law, Vol. 52, No. 3 (Jul., 1958), pp. 455–468
