= Benelux memorandum =

The Benelux memorandum of 1955 was a document drafted by the three Benelux countries (Belgium, the Netherlands, Luxembourg) on 18 May 1955 as a means to reviving European integration on the basis of a general common market.

== Background ==
The failure of the European Defence Community (EDC) and the European Political Community, brought the process of European integration to a standstill in 1954. At that moment Johan Willem Beyen (Netherlands Minister for Foreign Affairs) took the initiative to revive an idea, based on the Ouchy Convention of 1932, he had already put forward in December 1952 and February 1953 for the European Political Community (EPC). He proposed that the member states of the European Coal and Steel Community would develop a common market without customs duties or import quotas instead of a sector-based integration which had been the option taken by the ECSC. Beyen sent a memorandum to his Benelux colleagues Paul-Henri Spaak (Belgium) and Joseph Bech (Luxembourg) on 4 April 1955 in which he proposed his idea of a customs union.

The three Foreign Ministers of the Benelux met in The Hague on 23 April 1955. Based on the Beyen memorandum and a memorandum of Jean Monnet on nuclear energy they drafted a joint memorandum to present to their colleagues of the European Coal and Steel Community (ECSC). They finalized the memorandum on 18 May 1955 and presented it to the governments of France, Germany and Italy on 20 May 1955. They proposed to hold an intergovernmental conference to prepare integration in the fields mentioned in the memorandum, and to discuss the way towards a general integration of the European economy.

== Summary ==
In the memorandum the Benelux proposed the establishment of an Economic Community based on a general common market and a sectoral approach for transport and energy, especially nuclear energy (the last was in the line of the approach taken with the ECSC). The common market was to be achieved by a gradual reduction of trade restriction and custom tariffs. Besides the economic domain the memorandum proposed an integration also at the social and financial domain. In addition they proposed the creation of a joint (supranational) independent authority.

== Outcome ==
The Common Assembly of the European Coal and Steel Community assembled on 14 May 1955 decided that at the Messina Conference to be held later that month they would discuss the way to move forward towards European integration.

== Sources ==
- Benelux memorandum (18 May 1955) on CVCE website (Centre for European Studies).
- Letter from the Netherlands Foreign Minister to his ECSC partners (14 February 1953) on CVCE website (Centre for European Studies).
- The Beyen Plan on CVCE website (Centre for European Studies).
- Raymond F. Mikesell, The Lessons of Benelux and the European Coal and Steel Community for the European Economic Community, The American Economic Review, Vol. 48, No. 2, Papers and Proceedings of the Seventieth Annual Meeting of the American Economic Association (May, 1958), pp. 428–441
