= Baltic Assembly =

Multinational regional organisation

Baltic Assembly: Balti Assamblee (Estonian); Baltijas Asambleja (Latvian); Baltijos Asamblėja (Lithuanian)
- Flag Logo

- Member states of the Baltic Assembly (green).
- Headquarters: Riga
- Working languages: Estonian; Latvian; Lithuanian
- Type: Intergovernmental organization
- Membership: Estonia; Latvia; Lithuania

Leaders
  - Secretary General: (Latvia) Agnija Antanoviča
  - Secretary of the Estonian Delegation: (Estonia) Merilin Reepalu
  - Secretary of the Latvian Delegation: (Latvia) Ingrīda Sticenko
  - Secretary of the Lithuanian Delegation: (Lithuania) Renata Godfrey

History
  - Baltic Assembly established: 1 December 1990
  - Baltic Assembly regulations approved: 8 November 1991
  - Baltic Assembly structure and rules agreement: 13 June 1994
- GDP (PPP): 2026 estimate
  - Total: ▲$336.37 billion
  - Per capita: ▲$56,396
- GDP (nominal): 2026 estimate
  - Total: ▲$211.23 billion
  - Per capita: ▲$35,415
- HDI: ▲0.895 very high
- Website www.baltasam.org

The Baltic Assembly (BA) is a regional organisation that promotes intergovernmental cooperation between Estonia, Latvia, and Lithuania. It attempts to find a common position in relation to many international issues, including economic, political and cultural issues. The decisions of the assembly are advisory.

The budget of the BA is funded by the three members' governments. The official languages of the Baltic Assembly are Estonian, Latvian, and Lithuanian. The headquarters and secretariat of the organization are located in Riga, Latvia.

== History ==
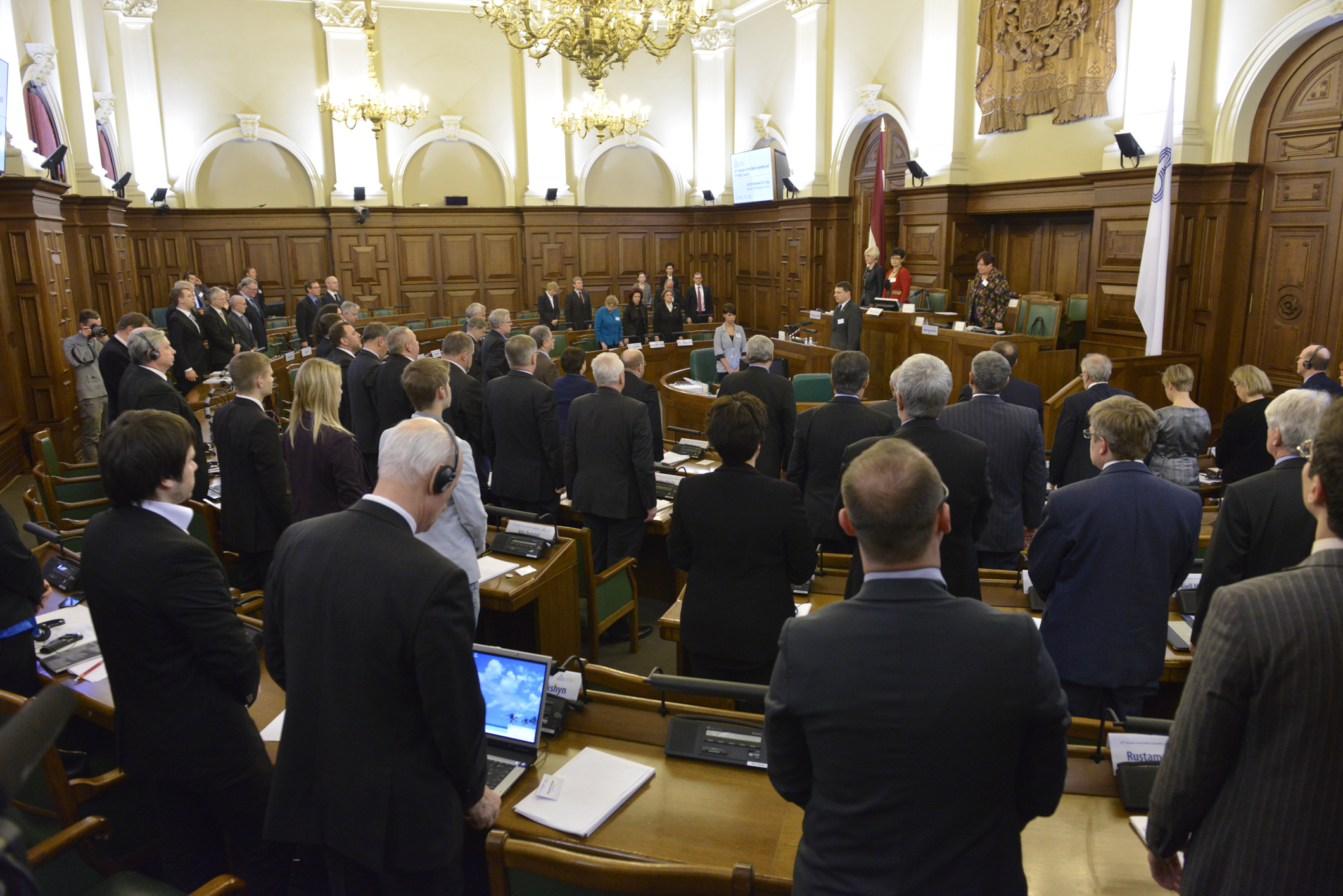
32nd session of the Baltic Assembly meeting in Riga in November 2013

=== Formation ===
The organisation was formed after a decision to establish it was made in Vilnius on 1 December 1990. It works under regulations approved on 8 November 1991 in Tallinn. On 13 June 1994, the three countries agreed to the structure and rules of the organization.

=== Achievements ===
The BA claims the following as its achievements between 1991 and 2003:

- Withdrawal of Russian troops from the member States,
- Formation of the Baltic Council of Ministers as an institution of governmental co-operation,
- Development of common Baltic economic, educational and information technology policies,
- Harmonisation of legislation in conformity with requirements of the European Union,
- Improvement of border-crossing procedures,
- The establishment of the Baltic Assembly Prizes for Literature, the Arts and Science.

=== Cooperation with other geopolitical regions ===
In 2017, the Baltic Assembly, the Benelux, and three of the members of the Nordic Council (Sweden, Denmark and Finland, all EU-member states) sought intensifying cooperation in the Digital Single Market and discussing social matters, the Economic and Monetary Union of the European Union, the European migrant crisis and defense cooperation. Relations with Russia, Turkey, and the United Kingdom were also on the agenda.

== Structure ==
The BA comprises sixty members. Each of the parliaments of the three States appoints twenty of its members to the Assembly. Each of the national parliaments appoints two of the members to be head and deputy head of the national delegation. The six head delegates and deputy head delegates form the BA's Presidium. The Chairman of the Presidium is the head of the national delegation of the country hosting the next session of the BA. The heads of the other two national delegations are Vice Chairmen of the Presidium. The Presidium controls the BA between sessions. The Chairman acts as the coordinator of the work of the BA, is its representative with other bodies and liaises with the three members’ governments.

== Sessions ==
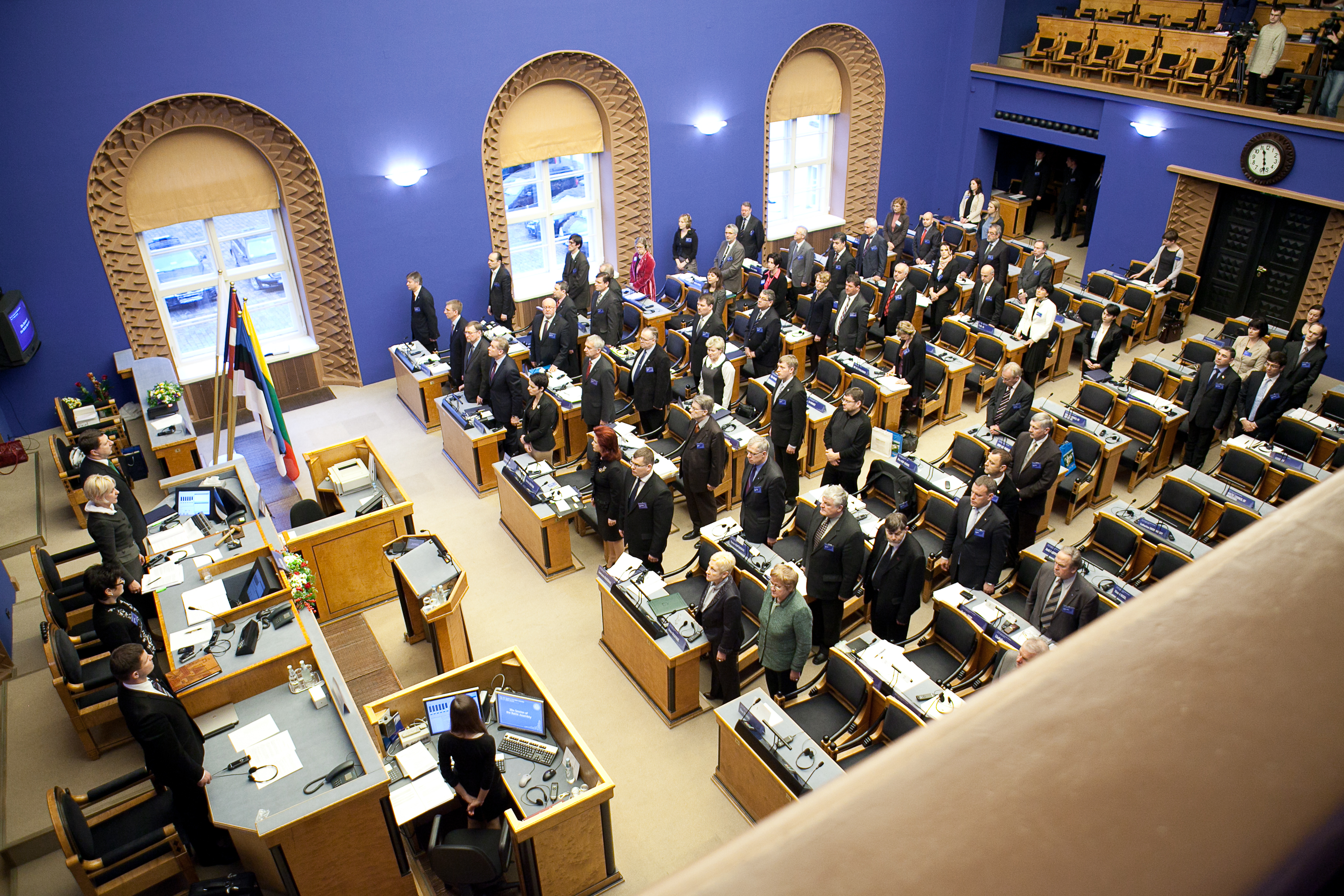
30th session of the Baltic Assembly meeting in Tallinn in November 2011

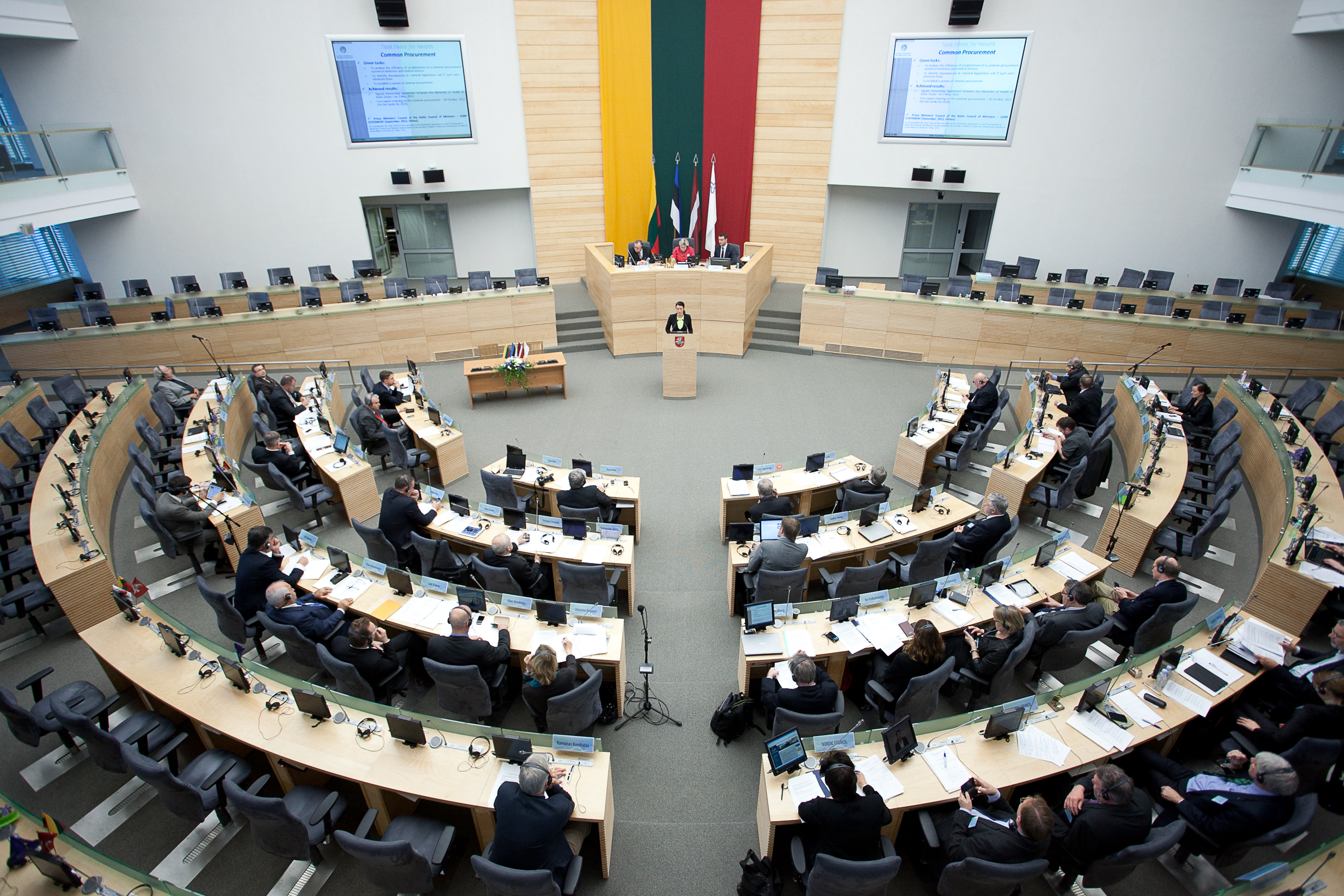
31st session of the Baltic Assembly meeting in Vilnius in November 2012

There are ordinary and extraordinary Sessions. The ordinary Session is convened once a year, as a concluding forum of a country's presidency, which proceeds according to a yearly rotation principle in Estonia, Latvia, and Lithuania. Before 2003 there were two Sessions a year – in spring and autumn, and countries - participants had half a year presidency.

Any national delegation may propose that an extraordinary session be held. On 8–9 February 1998 in Helsinki, Finland, following the 2nd Joint Meeting of the Nordic Council and the Baltic Assembly, the first Extraordinary Session of the Baltic Assembly took place. The second Extraordinary Session of the Baltic Assembly was held on 27–29 April 2005 in Pärnu, Estonia, following the 5th Joint Meeting of the Baltic Assembly and the Nordic Council.

== Committees ==
The following are the standing committees:

- Budget and Audit
- Economics, Energy and Innovation
- Education, Science and Culture
- Natural Resources and Environment
- Security and Defence

Each member of the Baltic Assembly participates in at least one committee.

== Political groupings ==
The 20 members of the BA from each country are chosen so that their political make-up reflects the proportions within their home parliament. The members may then form cross-national party groupings of at least five members from at least two nations.

== Baltic Assembly Prize for Literature, the Arts, and Science ==
A clickable Euler diagram showing the relationships between various European regional organisations

The idea on establishment of the Baltic Assembly Prize was conceived in 1992. The establishment of the Baltic Prize was inspired by the tradition of the Nordic Council Prizes.

On 31 October 1993 in Tallinn, Resolution on the Establishment of the Baltic Assembly Prizes in Culture, Arts and Science was adopted. Main aim of establishment of the Prizes was to "promote further cooperation among the three nations, provide new opportunities for exchanging cultural values and stimulate better understanding of the history and cultural heritage of the countries".

The aim of the Prize is to support outstanding achievements in literature, the arts and science; demonstrate the common interests of the countries in this region in upholding of their national identity and self-esteem; create an opportunity to learn about the achievements of the neighbouring countries; maintain a continuous interest among the people in Estonia, Latvia and Lithuania about developments in the Baltic States; strengthen cooperation among the Baltic States in the fields of literature, the arts and science; encourage more and more people to become interested in the intellectual values and languages of the Baltic nations; and raise the level of literature, the arts and science in the Baltic States.

== Medal of the Baltic Assembly ==
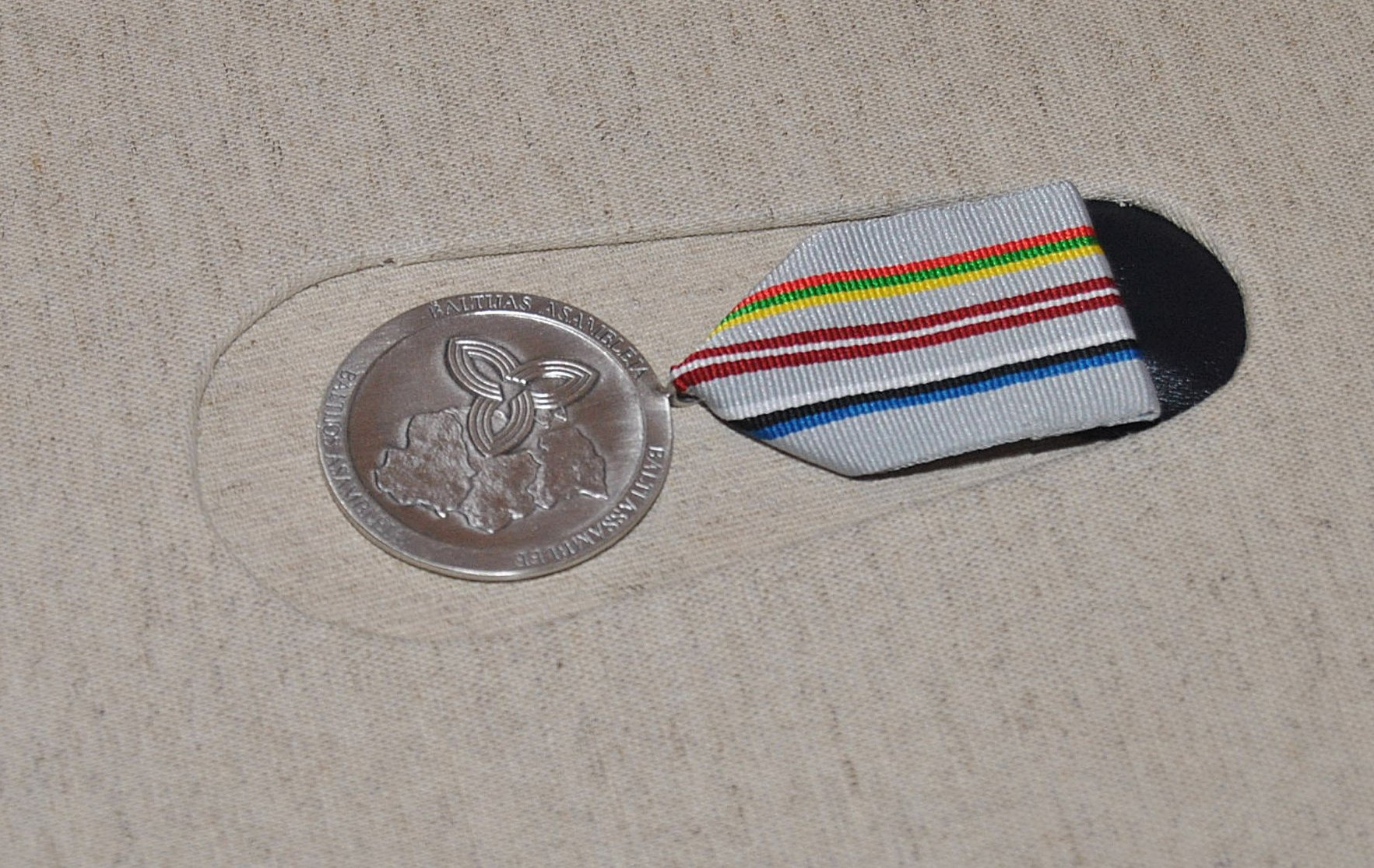
The Medal of the Baltic Assembly

The Medal of the Baltic Assembly is an award given by the organization to individuals that have contributed to upholding the unity and cooperation of the Baltic States, outstanding contribution and cooperation in implementing joint cooperation projects, promoting regional cooperation in an enlarged Europe.

== Baltic Innovation Prize of the Baltic Assembly ==
The Baltic Innovation Prize is an annual award given to the most innovative company in the Estonia, Latvia and Lithuania. The prize given to demonstrate the mutual interest of the Baltic States to support implementation of achievements in innovation and modern technologies.

== See also ==
- Nordic-Baltic Eight
- Nordic Council
- Council of the Baltic Sea States
- Baltic Entente
- New Hanseatic League
- Visegrád Group
