= Frugal Four =

Four European governments with fiscally conservative goals

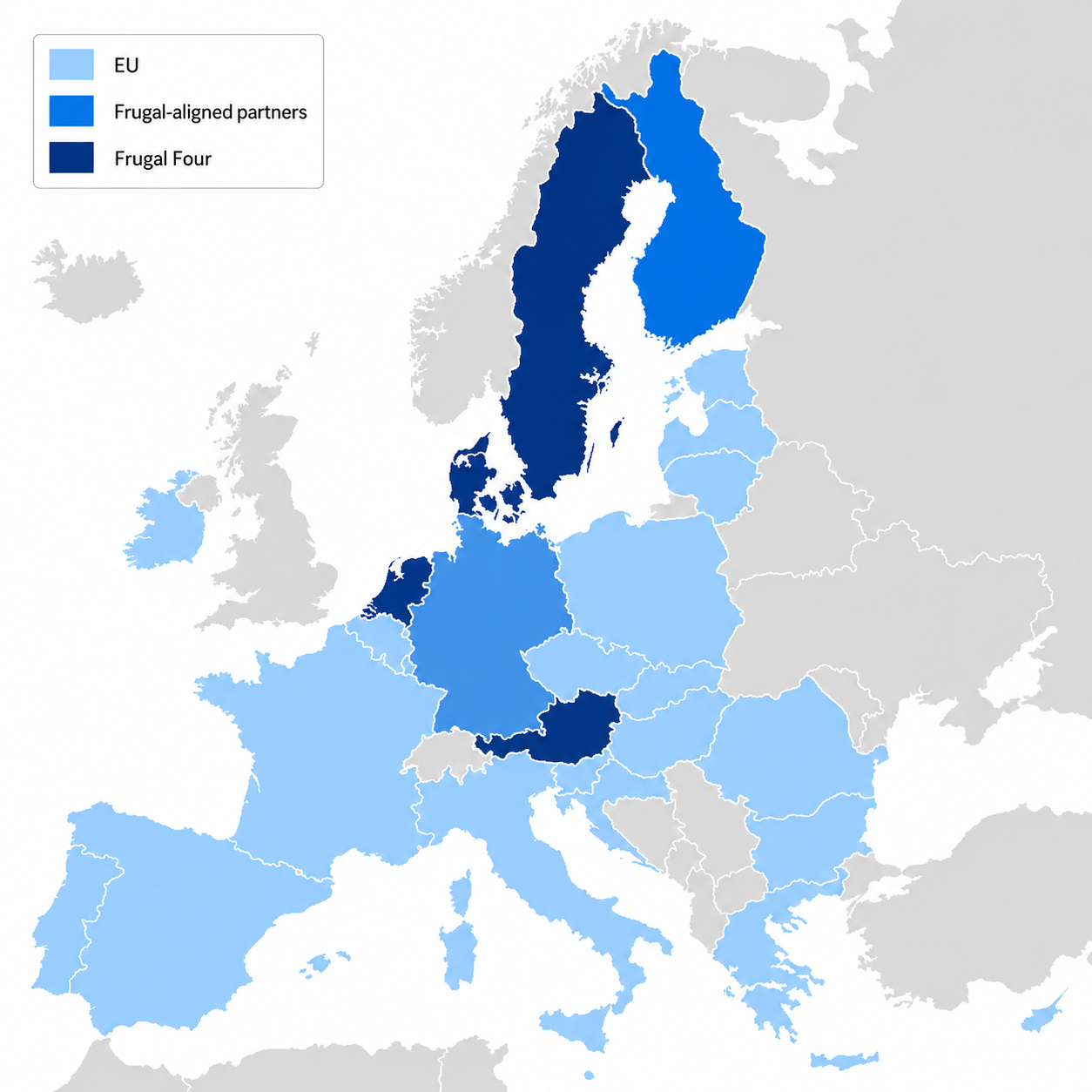
Map of the European Union in light blue with the Frugal Four and affiliated countries in darker blue.

The Frugal Four was the nickname of an informal cooperation among like-minded economically liberal (also known as fiscal conservatism) European countries, including Austria, Denmark, the Netherlands and Sweden. It partly evolved as a successor of the New Hanseatic League that was set up to make up for the loss of the like-minded United Kingdom in the European political arena after Brexit. However, it was never founded as a transnational organisation like similar cooperations of countries in the European Union with shared interests.

Along with like-minded Germany, the Frugal Four advocated for EU budget rebates and tight fiscal policies in the eurozone governed by the Stability and Growth Pact, and generally advocated against a large distributive European budget and collective EU debt. They were, however, not Eurosceptic.

The Frugal Four experienced widespread media coverage throughout the COVID-19 pandemic in Europe.

On 3 June 2025, the alliance was disbanded with the departure of Denmark from the group to focus the nation's priorities on European defence.

Despite Denmark's withdrawal from the original grouping, the term “frugal countries” continued to be used for a broader group of fiscally conservative EU member states. During negotiations over the European Union's 2028–2034 budget in 2026, Austria, Denmark, Finland, Germany, the Netherlands and Sweden jointly opposed an increase in overall spending.

== Position ==
In an op-ed by Austria's former chancellor Sebastian Kurz published in the Financial Times, he described the goals of the Frugal Four as a focus on budget contribution to the EU remaining stable, namely at a maximum of 1 per cent of the EU's gross national income, as well as devoting at least 25 per cent of it to fighting climate change. Furthermore, the Frugal Four wish for spending conditions that are tied to supporting the effective implementation of EU-wide policy objectives and the upholding of the rule of law. These positions came as a response to those countries within the bloc that see a need for higher contributions to the EU's budget after Brexit. The Frugal Four also disagrees with the idea of Eurobonds, a tool for joint bonds within the eurozone, as well as taking mutualised debts within the EU. As a consequence, the group stands opposed to the idea of corona bonds as well.

== COVID-19 pandemic and member change ==
During a summit of EU leaders on 26 March 2020, Germany and the Frugal Four rejected a joint European recovery initiative. Germany was widely considered to be as fiscally conservative as the Frugal Four, hence the context in which the coalition of states was also sometimes referred to as the "Frugal Five". This changed in May 2020 the latest when Germany joined France's call for a €500 billion recovery fund for the EU. This new measure to tackle the pandemic and its consequences would lead to shared borrowing with other EU member countries, a position that Germany tried to avoid until that point. Later the original group's demands were supported by Finland.

Although the Frugal Four in a non-paper vetoed any deal “leading to debt mutualisation”, they eventually accepted the joint European Next Generation EU fund on the European Council in July 2020.
