= Andrea Ammon =

German physician

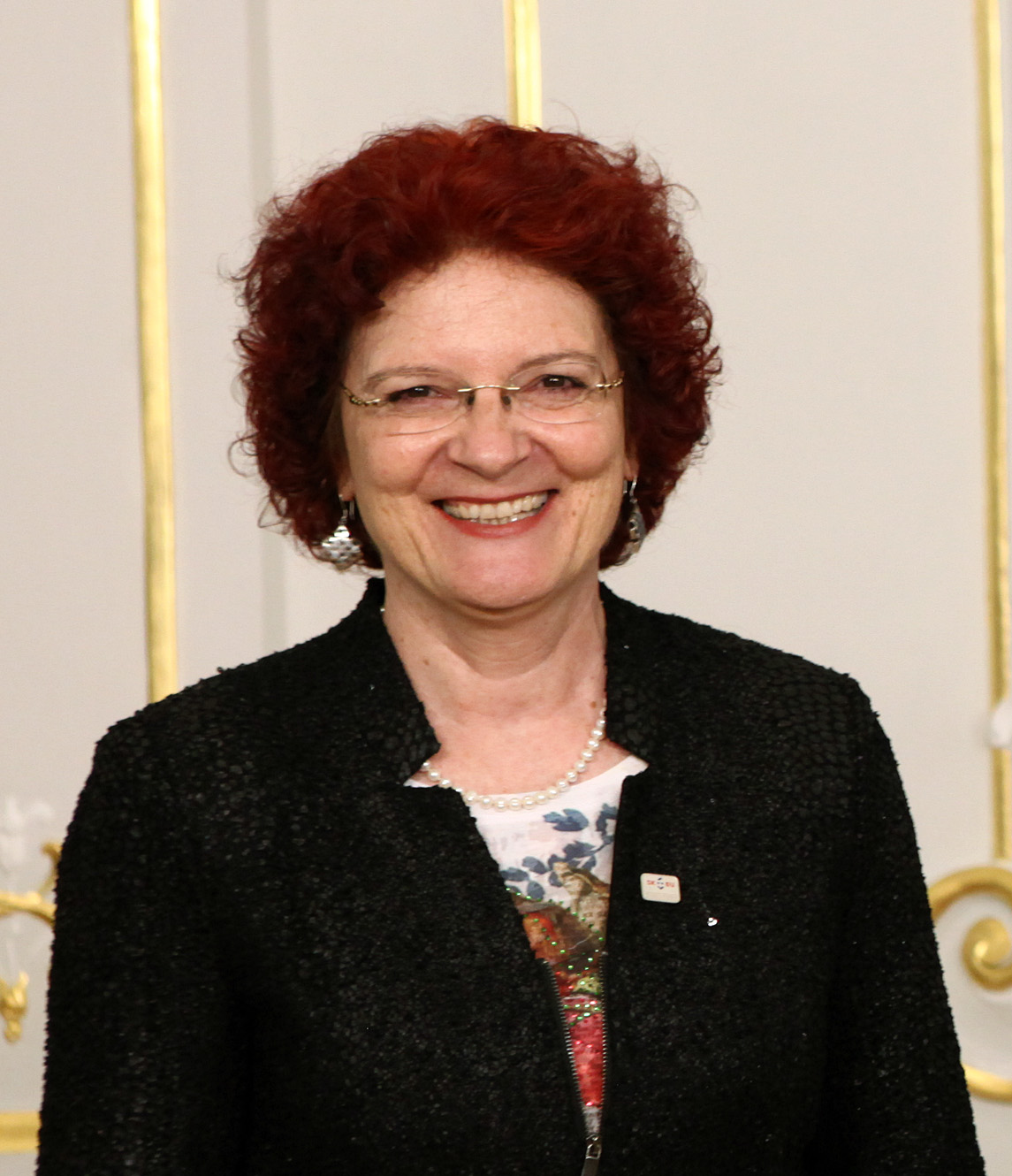

Director of the European Centre for Disease Prevention and Control
- In office 1 May 2015 – 15 June 2024
- Preceded by: Marc Sprenger
- Succeeded by: Pamela Rendi-Wagner

Personal details
- Born: 11 December 1958 (age 67)

Andrea Ammon (born 11 December 1958) is a German physician and the former director of the European Centre for Disease Prevention and Control (ECDC), a European Union (EU) agency strengthening Europe's defence against infectious disease. She advised the German government on the SARS and Influenza A virus subtype H2N2 outbreaks.

== Early life and education ==
In 1996, Ammon completed her doctorate in medicine at LMU Munich, where she studied the quality of life for patients that have palliative therapy for metastatic liver disease.

== Career ==
Ammon joined the Robert Koch Institute in Berlin in 1996. Between 2002 and 2005, she was Head of Department for Infectious Disease Epidemiology. At the Robert Koch Institute, Ammon was responsible for the German national outbreak surveillance system, coordinating their response to severe acute respiratory syndrome (SARS) and Influenza A virus subtype H2N2. As part of this effort, Ammon investigated in-flight transmission of SARS and found that it was uncommon; and only likely if infected people fly during symptomatic phases of their illness.

In 2005, Ammon joined the European Centre for Disease Prevention and Control (ECDC), where she was appointed Head of Surveillance. She was one of the first employees at the ECDC, and has since been described as "instrumental" in establishing the surveillance strategy. The ECDC looks to standardise infection control across the European Union, ensuring consistent practise took place in the surveillance networks of member states. In this capacity she was responsible for the formation of The European Surveillance System (TESSy), a uniform, long-term data acquisition system for the European Union. TESSy launched in April 2008.

Ammon was responsible for evaluating the European Dedicated Surveillance Networks (DSN), which included the EURO TB and EURO HIV networks, eventually incorporating them into the framework of the ECDC. In 2011, she was made deputy director of the Resource Management and Coordination unit. A few years later, she led the European Scientific Conference on Applied Infectious Disease Epidemiology. As part of the conference, in the wake of the Western African Ebola virus epidemic, Ammon oversaw sessions on food-borne diseases, zoonotic viruses and globalisation. She succeeded Marc Sprenger as Acting Director of the ECDC on 1 May 2015. She was subsequently appointed Director on 22 March 2017 and took office on 16 June 2017. In 2017 the ECDC and WHO announced that whilst cases of tuberculosis were on the decline in Europe, tuberculosis in relation to HIV was on the rise.

During the COVID-19 pandemic, Ammon was involved with the global response to the COVID-19 pandemic. On January 26, Ammon and the ECDC advised governments in the European Union to strengthen their healthcare capacity. Unfortunately, the ECDC had over-estimated the stocks of personal protective equipment and lab testing capacity in individual member states, resulting in considerable spread of coronavirus disease across Europe. She has since said that the extensive spread of coronavirus in Europe can be linked to the return of holidaymakers from skiing trips in early March. In early May, Ammon gave evidence before the European Parliament on public health, and said that the United Kingdom was behind other European member states in their response to coronavirus disease. In an interview with The Guardian on May 20, 2020, Ammon emphasised that there was likely to be a second wave of SARS-CoV-2 infections, "...the question is when and how big."

In the preparations for the Global Health Summit hosted by the European Commission and the G20 in May 2021, Ammon was a member of the event's High Level Scientific Panel.

== Selected publications ==
- Friedrich, Alexander W.; Bielaszewska, Martina; Zhang, Wen-Lan; Pulz, Matthias; Kuczius, Thorsten; Ammon, Andrea; Karch, Helge (2002-01-01). "Escherichia coli Harboring Shiga Toxin 2 Gene Variants: Frequency and Association with Clinical Symptoms". The Journal of Infectious Diseases. 185 (1): 74–84. doi:10.1086/338115. ISSN 0022-1899. PMID 11756984.
- Ammon, Andrea; Petersen, Lyle R.; Karch, Helge (1999-05-01). "A Large Outbreak of Hemolytic Uremic Syndrome Caused by an Unusual Sorbitol-Fermenting Strain of Escherichia coli O157:H—". The Journal of Infectious Diseases. 179 (5): 1274–1277. doi:10.1086/314715. ISSN 0022-1899. PMID 10191236.
- Werber, Dirk; Dreesman, Johannes; Feil, Fabian; van Treeck, Ulrich; Fell, Gerhard; Ethelberg, Steen; Hauri, Anja M.; Roggentin, Peter; Prager, Rita; Fisher, Ian S.T.; Behnke, Susanne C. (2005-02-03). "International outbreak of Salmonella Oranienburg due to German chocolate". BMC Infectious Diseases. 5 (1): 7. doi:10.1186/1471-2334-5-7. ISSN 1471-2334. PMC 552305. PMID 15691371.

== See also ==
- Zsuzsanna Jakab
