= Eurobond (eurozone) =

Type of government bond jointly issued by eurozone countries

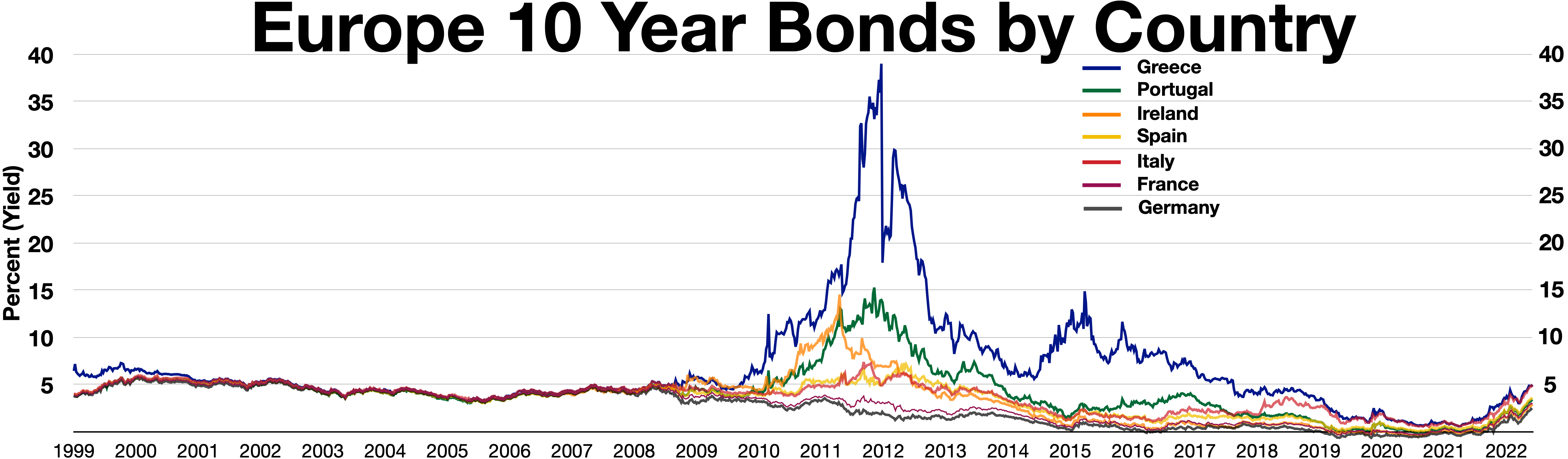
European 10-year bonds, before the Great Recession in Europe bonds floated together in parity Greece 10-year bond Portugal 10-year bond Ireland 10-year bond Spain 10-year bond Italy 10-year bond France 10-year bond Germany 10-year bond

Eurobonds or stability bonds were proposed government bonds to be issued in euros jointly by the European Union's 19 eurozone states. The idea was first raised by the Barroso European Commission in 2011 during the 2009–2012 European sovereign debt crisis. Eurobonds would be debt investments whereby an investor loans a certain amount of money, for a certain amount of time, with a certain interest rate, to the eurozone bloc altogether, which then forwards the money to individual governments. The proposal was floated again in 2020 as a potential response to the impacts of the COVID-19 pandemic in Europe, leading such debt issue to be dubbed "corona bonds".

Eurobonds have been suggested as a way to tackle the 2009–2012 European debt crisis as the indebted states could borrow new funds at better conditions as they are supported by the rating of the non-crisis states. Because Eurobonds would allow already highly indebted states access to cheaper credit thanks to the strength of other eurozone economies, they are controversial, and may suffer from the free rider problem. The proposal was generally favoured by indebted governments such as Portugal, Greece, and Ireland, but encountered strong opposition, notably from Germany, the eurozone's strongest economy. The plan ultimately never moved forward in face of German and Dutch opposition; the crisis was ultimately resolved by the ECB's declaration in 2012 that it would do "whatever it takes" to stabilise the currency, rendering the Eurobond proposal moot.

== Blue bond proposal ==
In May 2010 the two economists Jakob von Weizsäcker and Jacques Delpla published an article proposing a mix of traditional national bonds (red bonds) and jointly issued eurobonds (blue bonds) to prevent debt crises in weaker countries, while at the same time enforcing fiscal sustainability. According to the proposal EU member states should pool up to 60 per cent of gross domestic product (GDP) of their national debt under joint and several liability as senior sovereign debt (blue tranche), thereby reducing the borrowing cost for that part of the debt. Any national debt beyond a country's blue bond allocation (red tranche) should be issued as national and junior debt with sound procedures for an orderly default, thus increasing the marginal cost of public borrowing and helping to enhance fiscal discipline. Participating countries must also establish an Independent Stability Council voted on by member states parliaments to propose annually an allocation for the blue bond and to safeguard fiscal responsibility.

The authors argue that while their concept is not a quick fix, their Blue Bond proposal charts an incentive-driven and durable way out of the debt dilemma while "helping prepare the ground for the rise of the euro as an important reserve currency, which could reduce borrowing costs for everybody involved". Smaller countries with relatively illiquid sovereign bonds (such as Austria and Luxembourg) could benefit most from the extra liquidity of the blue bond, although Germany's borrowing costs under the blue bond scheme would be expected to fall below current levels. Countries with high debt-to-GDP ratios (such as Italy, Greece, and Portugal) would have a strong incentive for fiscal adjustment.

== European Commission proposal ==
On 21 November 2011 the European Commission suggested European bonds issued jointly by the 17 eurozone states as an effective way to mitigate the 2008 financial crisis. On 23 November 2011, the Commission presented a green paper assessing the feasibility of common issuance of sovereign bonds among the EU member states of the eurozone. Sovereign issuance in the eurozone is currently conducted individually by each EU member states. The introduction of commonly issued eurobonds would mean a pooling of sovereign issuance among the member states and the sharing of associated revenue flows and debt-servicing costs.

On 29 November 2012, European Commission president Jose Manuel Barroso suggested to introduce Eurobonds step by step, first applying to short-term bonds, then two-year bonds, and later Eurobonds, based on a deeply integrated economic and fiscal governance framework.

=== Three approaches to eurobonds ===
The green paper lists three broad approaches for common issuance of eurobonds based on the degree of substitution of national issuance (full or partial) and the nature of the underlying guarantee (joint and several or several).

1. Full eurobonds with joint liability: This option suggests to fully replace the entire national issuance by eurobonds, each EU member being fully liable for the entire issuance. According to the European Commission "this would have strong potential positive effects on stability and integration. But at the same time, it would, by abolishing all market or interest rate pressure on Member States, pose a relatively high risk of moral hazard and it might need significant treaty changes."
2. Partial eurobonds with joint liability: The second option would pool only a portion of borrowings, again guaranteed by all. This means EU member states would still partly issue national bonds to cover the share of their debts beyond a certain percentage of GDP not covered by eurobonds. The Commission does not state a specific volume or share of financing needs that would be covered by national bonds at the one hand and eurobonds on the other. However, the proposal is similar to that of the German Council of Economic Experts that proposed a European collective redemption fund, which would mutualise the debt in the eurozone above 60%, combined with a bold debt reduction scheme for those countries, which are not on life support from the European Financial Stability Facility. This option is expected to require an amendment of the TFEU treaty.
3. Partial eurobonds without joint guarantees: According to the third option that is similar to the blue bond proposal, eurobonds would again cover only parts of the debt (like option 2) but without joint guarantees. This could impose strict entry conditions for a smaller group of countries to pool some debt and allow for the removal of countries that do not meet their fiscal obligations. Due to "a mechanism to redistribute some of the funding advantages ... between the higher- and lower-rated" governments, this option aims to minimise the risk of moral hazard for the conduct of economic and fiscal policies. Unlike the first two approaches, this would involve "several but not joint" government guarantees and could therefore be implemented relatively quickly without having to change EU treaties.

==== Suggested effects ====
According to the European Commission proposal the introduction of eurobonds would create new means through which governments finance their debt, by offering safe and liquid investment opportunities. This "could potentially quickly alleviate the current sovereign debt crisis, as the high-yield Member States could benefit from the stronger creditworthiness of the low-yield Member States." The effect would be immediate even if the introduction of eurobonds takes some time, since changed market expectations adapt instantly, resulting in lower average and marginal funding costs, particularly to those EU member states most affected by the 2008 financial crisis. The commission also believes that eurobonds could make the eurozone financial system more resilient to future adverse shocks and reinforce financial stability. Furthermore, they could reduce the vulnerability of banks in the eurozone to deteriorating credit ratings of individual member states by providing them with a source of more robust collateral. Setting a euro-area wide integrated bond market would offer a safe and liquid investment opportunity for savers and financial institutions that matches its US$ counterpart in terms of size and liquidity, which would also strengthen the position of the euro as an international reserve currency and foster a more balanced global financial system.

The governments of those states that most people would like to take over those debt risks do not think that this is a good idea and see other effects. They do not understand why they should help a group of states that have excessively borrowed and circumvented the EU contracts for many years should by making it easier for them to borrow more via Eurobonds. Germany is one of those sceptical states, together with Austria, Finland and the Netherlands.

Hans-Werner Sinn from the Munich-based Ifo Institute for Economic Research believes the cost for German tax payers to be between 33 and 47 billion Euros per year. Other economists such as Henrik Enderlein from the Hertie School of Governance and Gustav Horn from the Macroeconomic Policy Institute (IMK) contend these figures. Both suggest that German interest rates would only go up marginally, as Eurobonds would benefit from substantially higher liquidity and demand from around the world. Again others believe German interest rates could even go down. Experts from the German finance ministry expect borrowing costs to go up by 0.8%, resulting in additional borrowing costs of 2.5 billion Euros in the first year of introduction and 5 billion in the second year, reaching 20–25 billion Euros after 10 years respectively. After all, Eurobond supporters argue that their introduction "would be far less expensive than the continuous increases to the emergency umbrella or even a failure of the euro."

=== Tighter fiscal rules ===
Presenting the idea of "stability bonds", Jose Manuel Barroso insisted that any such plan would have to be matched by tight fiscal surveillance and economic policy co-ordination as an essential counterpart so as to avoid moral hazard and ensure sustainable public finances. Under the proposals, eurozone governments would have to submit their draft national budgets for the following year to the European Commission by 15 October. The commission would then be able to ask the government to revise the budget if it believed that it was not sound enough to meet its targets for debt and deficit levels as set out in the Euro convergence criteria.

On 9 December 2011 at the European Council meeting, all 17 members of the euro zone and six states that aspire to join agreed on a new intergovernmental treaty to put strict caps on government spending and borrowing, with penalties for those countries that violate the limits. All other non-eurozone countries except Great Britain are also prepared to join in, subject to parliamentary vote.

== Reactions ==
Italy and Greece have frequently spoken out in favour of eurobonds, the then Italian Minister of economy Giulio Tremonti calling it the "master solution" to the eurozone debt crisis. A growing field of investors and economists share this belief, saying eurobonds would be the best way of solving the debt crisis.

However, Germany remains opposed to debt that would be jointly issued and underwritten by all 17 members of the currency bloc, saying it could substantially raise the country's liabilities in the debt crisis. Barroso maintained that Germany did not oppose joint issuance in principle, but questioned the timing of it. Austria, Bulgaria, Finland and the Netherlands have also raised objections over eurobond issuance. Bulgarian finance minister Simeon Djankov criticised eurobonds in Austria's Der Standard: "Cheap credit got us into the current eurozone crisis, it's naive to think it is going to get us out of it."

=== Counter proposals ===
On 28 November 2011, German newspaper Die Welt reported that Germany, France and four other AAA-rated EU members may issue common "elite bonds" (or "triple A bonds") in a bid to raise more money at low interest rates for themselves and, under strict conditions, to help also indebted euro region members. Austria, Finland, Luxembourg and the Netherlands are said to be part of the plan aimed at stabilising the top-rated countries and calming financial markets. Common bonds of the six countries are expected to have an interest rate of 2 per cent to 2.5 per cent.

Following the 2011 proposal made by the "five wise economists" from the German Council of Economic Experts, Guy Verhofstadt, leader of the liberal ALDE group in the European Parliament, suggested creating a European collective redemption fund. It would mutualise eurozone debt above 60%, combining it with a bold debt reduction scheme for countries not on life support from the EFSF.

In January 2012, a working group within the European League for Economic Cooperation unveiled a blueprint for a Euro T-Bill Fund. The proposal, which elaborates further on a concept first introduced by Rabo Bank's Chief Economist Wim Boonstra, calls for a temporary fund of only four years and bonds with a maturity of a maximum of two years.

In March 2012, Boston Consulting Group also followed up on the German Council proposal, agreeing that "the scope of the problem is too great to be solved by the European Stability Mechanism or the medium-term injection of liquidity by the European Central Bank" and favouring limited-scope Eurobonds.

In June 2012, German chancellor Angela Merkel firmly rejected any German support for Eurobonds.

== Critics ==
The planned introduction of Eurobonds has been criticised by economists for reasons such as the free rider problem and moral hazard. Beside economic grounds, mainly legal and political reasons are mentioned which could prohibit the introduction of Eurobonds: Article 125 of the Lisbon Treaty states explicitly that the European Union and its member states are not liable for the commitments of other members. Since Eurobonds would possibly contravene Article 125, it may have to be changed prior introduction.

== Corona bonds ==
The positions of the national governments on eurobonds in April 2020 Yes/In favour No/Against Neutral or unknown position

Spanish and Italian leaders have called for jointly issued "corona bonds" to help their countries, hard-hit by the outbreak of coronavirus disease 2019, to recover from the epidemic. Corona bonds were discussed on 26 March 2020 in a European Council meeting, but Germany and the Netherlands ruled out issuing such bonds. European Central Bank head Christine Lagarde, who plans (separately) to buy more than 1 trillion euros in bonds in response to coronavirus, urged the EU to consider issuing corona bonds. After the meeting, Spanish leaders continued to argue for jointly issued debt.

Despite the fact that the European Commission and European Central Bank released billions in special funds, relaxed the limits for budget deficits and government debt of EU countries, some members (such as France, Italy, Spain, Belgium, Ireland, Portugal, Greece, Slovenia and Luxembourg) demanded more to be done in relation to the COVID-19 pandemic. However, Germany which was the strongest opponent of eurobonds, was supported by Austria, the Netherlands, Finland and Estonia. In the meantime, Italian Prime Minister Giuseppe Conte questioned: "What do we want to do in Europe? Does each member state want to go its own way?", he also added: "If we are a union, now is the time to prove it", in Germany's weekly Die Zeit. Conte also described the European Stability Mechanism (ESM) as "completely inadequate" to face the crisis.

Later on, European Commission chief Ursula von der Leyen mentioned that "Today Europe is mobilising alongside Italy. Unfortunately, this has not always been the case", she later added that EU "will allocate up to 100 billion euros ($110 billion) to the hardest hit countries, starting from Italy, to compensate for the reduction in the wages of those working on shorter hours". The main opposition to the plan by the Commission came from the so-called Frugal Four.

Eventually, in July 2020 the European Council agreed to issue European sovereign bonds of 750 billion €, branded Next Generation EU, to support member states hit by the COVID-19 pandemic.

== Eurobonds: a safe asset in response to geopolitical uncertainty ==
In the ensuing years, escalating geopolitical tensions—including the Russian invasion of Ukraine, the weaponization of global financial networks, and aggressive state-subsidized industrial policies from the United States and China—prompted calls to make joint debt issuance a permanent feature of the Eurozone architecture. in this context, Mario Draghi's report on European competitiveness and Enrico Letta's report on the Single Market, fundamentally reframed Eurobonds as a geopolitical and industrial necessity rather than merely a tool for internal macroeconomic stabilization.

A central argument in this renewed context is the necessity of Eurobonds for bolstering the international role of the euro. Monetary theorists and geopolitical analysts note that the primary structural barrier preventing the euro from challenging the global dominance of the U.S. dollar is the absence of a unified, highly rated, and deeply liquid safe asset comparable to U.S. Treasuries. Proponents include French economist Olivier Blanchard and the Spanish Finance Minister Carlos Cuerpo who argued that issuing Eurobonds "will unlock something Europe has never had: the ability to finance common public goods — defence, energy, digital infrastructure".

== See also ==
- Green bond
- Risk
- Social impact bond
- List of countries by credit rating
