= Oslo Agreements, 1930 =

1930 multilateral economic agreements

The Oslo Agreements or Convention of Economic Rapprochement of 22 December 1930 were an economic agreement between the countries which had already agreed upon the Dutch-Scandinavian Economic Pact (Netherlands, Denmark, Norway, and Sweden) earlier that year and the countries of the BLEU, Belgium and Luxembourg. Finland would join the agreement in 1933.

The countries promised not to raise tariffs between them without first notifying and consulting the other signatory powers. As with the Dutch-Scandinavian Economic Pact, the Oslo Agreements were one of the regional responses to the Great Depression.

== See also ==
- Ouchy Convention

== Sources ==
- Nordic Trade Policy in the 1930s
- Declaration of 1 July 1938 (end of the agreement)
- Eichengreen, Barry; Irwin, Douglas A. (February 1995). "Trade blocs, currency blocs and the reorientation of world trade in the 1930s". Journal of International Economics. 38 (1–2): 1–24. doi:10.1016/0022-1996(95)92754-P.
- M. Alice Matthews (April 1931). "Chronicle of International Events". The American Journal of International Law. 25 (2): 348–359. doi:10.1017/S0002930000080787. JSTOR 2190157.
- Ger van Roon (October 1989). "Great Britain and the Oslo States". Journal of Contemporary History. 24 (4): 657–664. doi:10.1177/002200948902400405. JSTOR 260883. S2CID 220875119.
- "Scandinavian Economic Agreement". American Journal of International Law. 25 (1): 118–118. 1931.
