= Anthrax vaccine =

Vaccines against the bacterium Bacillus anthracis

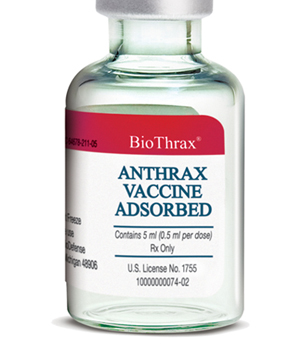

Vaccine description
- Target: Anthrax

Anthrax vaccines are vaccines to prevent the livestock and human disease anthrax, caused by the bacterium Bacillus anthracis.

They have had a prominent place in the history of medicine, from Pasteur's pioneering 19th-century work with cattle (the first effective bacterial vaccine and the second effective vaccine ever) to the controversial late 20th century use of a modern product to protect American troops against the use of anthrax in biological warfare. Human anthrax vaccines were developed by the Soviet Union in the late 1930s and in the US and UK in the 1950s. The current vaccine approved by the U.S. Food and Drug Administration (FDA) was formulated in the 1960s.

Currently administered human anthrax vaccines include acellular (USA, UK) and live spore (Russia) varieties. All currently used anthrax vaccines show considerable local and general reactogenicity (erythema, induration, soreness, fever) and serious adverse reactions occur in about 1% of recipients. New third-generation vaccines being researched include recombinant live vaccines and recombinant sub-unit vaccines.

== Pasteur's vaccine ==
In the 1870s, the French chemist Louis Pasteur (1822–1895) applied his previous method of immunising chickens against chicken cholera to anthrax, which affected cattle, and thereby aroused widespread interest in combating other diseases with the same approach. In May 1881, Pasteur performed a famous public experiment at Pouilly-le-Fort to demonstrate his concept of vaccination. He prepared two groups of 25 sheep, one goat and several cows. The animals of one group were twice injected, with an interval of 15 days, with an anthrax vaccine prepared by Pasteur; a control group was left unvaccinated. Thirty days after the first injection, both groups were injected with a culture of live anthrax bacteria. All the animals in the non-vaccinated group died, while all of the animals in the vaccinated group survived. The public reception was sensational.

Pasteur publicly claimed he had made the anthrax vaccine by exposing the bacilli to oxygen. His laboratory notebooks, now in the Bibliothèque Nationale in Paris, in fact show Pasteur used the method of rival Jean-Joseph-Henri Toussaint (1847–1890), a Toulouse veterinary surgeon, to create the anthrax vaccine. This method used the oxidizing agent potassium dichromate. Pasteur's oxygen method did eventually produce a vaccine but only after he had been awarded a patent on the production of an anthrax vaccine.

The notion of a weak form of a disease causing immunity to the virulent version was not new; this had been known for a long time for smallpox. Inoculation with smallpox (variolation) was known to result in far less scarring, and greatly reduced mortality, in comparison with the naturally acquired disease. The English physician Edward Jenner (1749–1823) had also discovered (1796) the process of vaccination by using cowpox to give cross-immunity to smallpox and by Pasteur's time this had generally replaced the use of actual smallpox material in inoculation. The difference between smallpox vaccination and anthrax or chicken cholera vaccination was that the weakened form of the latter two disease organisms had been "generated artificially", so a naturally weak form of the disease organism did not need to be found. This discovery revolutionized work in infectious diseases and Pasteur gave these artificially weakened diseases the generic name "vaccines", in honor of Jenner's groundbreaking discovery. In 1885, Pasteur produced his celebrated first vaccine for rabies by growing the virus in rabbits and then weakening it by drying the affected nerve tissue.

In 1995, the centennial of Pasteur's death, The New York Times ran an article titled "Pasteur's Deception". After having thoroughly read Pasteur's lab notes, the science historian Gerald L. Geison declared Pasteur had given a misleading account of the preparation of the anthrax vaccine used in the experiment at Pouilly-le-Fort. The same year, Max Perutz published a vigorous defense of Pasteur in The New York Review of Books.

== Sterne's vaccine ==
The Austrian-South African immunologist Max Sterne (1905–1997) developed an attenuated live animal vaccine in 1935 that is still employed and derivatives of his strain account for almost all veterinary anthrax vaccines used in the world today. Beginning in 1934 at the Onderstepoort Veterinary Research Institute, north of Pretoria, he prepared an attenuated anthrax vaccine, using the method developed by Pasteur. A persistent problem with Pasteur's vaccine was achieving the correct balance between virulence and immunogenicity during preparation. This notoriously difficult procedure regularly produced casualties among vaccinated animals. With little help from colleagues, Sterne performed small-scale experiments which isolated the "Sterne strain" (34F2) of anthrax which became, and remains today, the basis of most of the improved livestock anthrax vaccines throughout the world.

As Sterne's vaccine is a live vaccine, vaccination during use of antibiotics produces much reduced results and should be avoided. There is a withholding period after vaccination when animals cannot be slaughtered. No such period is defined for milk and there are no reports of humans being infected by products from vaccinated animals. There have been a few cases when humans accidentally self-inject the vaccine when trying to administer to a struggling animal. One case developed fever and meningitis, but it is unclear whether the illness was caused by the vaccine. Livestock anthrax vaccines are made in many countries around the world, most of which use 34F2 with saponin adjuvant.

== Soviet/Russian anthrax vaccines ==
Anthrax vaccines were developed in the Soviet Union in the 1930s and available for use in humans by 1940. A live attenuated, unencapsulated spore vaccine became widely used for humans. It was given either by scarification or subcutaneous injection (only in emergency) and its developers claimed that it was reasonably well tolerated and showed some degree of protective efficacy against cutaneous anthrax in clinical field trials. The efficacy of the live Russian vaccine was reported to have been greater than that of either of the killed British or US anthrax vaccines (AVP and AVA, respectively) during the 1970s and '80s. The STI-1 vaccine, consisting only of freeze-dried spores, is given in a two-dose schedule, but serious side-effects restricted its use to healthy adults. It was reportedly manufactured at the George Eliava Institute of Bacteriophage, Microbiology and Virology in Tbilisi, Georgia, until 1991. As of 2008, the STI-1 vaccine remains available, and is the only human anthrax vaccine "nominally available outside national borders".

China uses a different live attenuated strain for their human vaccines, designated "A16R". The A16R vaccine is given as a suspension in 50% glycerol and distilled water. A single dose is given by scarification, followed by a booster in 6 or 12 months, then annual boosters.

== British anthrax vaccines ==
British biochemist Harry Smith (1921–2011), working for the UK bio-weapons program at Porton Down, discovered the three anthrax toxins in 1948. This discovery was the basis of the next generation of antigenic anthrax vaccines and for modern antitoxins to anthrax. The widely used British anthrax vaccine—sometimes called anthrax vaccine precipitated (AVP) to distinguish it from the similar AVA (see below)—became available for human use in 1954. This was a cell-free vaccine in distinction to the live-cell Pasteur-style vaccine previously used for veterinary purposes. It is now manufactured by Porton Biopharma Ltd, a Company owned by the UK Department of Health.

AVP is administered at primovaccination in three doses with a booster dose after six months. The active ingredient is a sterile filtrate of an alum-precipitated anthrax antigen from the Sterne strain in a solution for injection. The other ingredients are aluminium potassium sulphate (potassium alum), sodium chloride and purified water. The preservative is thiomersal (0.005%). The vaccine is given by intramuscular injection and the primary course of four single injections (3 injections 3 weeks apart, followed by a 6-month dose) is followed by a single booster dose given once a year. During the Gulf War (1990–1991), UK military personnel were given AVP concomitantly with the pertussis vaccine as an adjuvant to improve overall immune response and efficacy.

== American anthrax vaccines ==
The United States undertook basic research directed at producing a new anthrax vaccine during the 1950s and '60s. Research under the auspices of the US Army at Fort Detrick in Frederick, MD was led by George G. Wright and Milton Puziss. The Wright/Puziss vaccine, known as anthrax vaccine adsorbed (AVA)—trade name BioThrax—was licensed in 1970 by the U.S. National Institutes of Health (NIH) and in 1972 the Food and Drug Administration (FDA) took over responsibility for vaccine licensure and oversight. AVA is produced from culture filtrates of an avirulent, nonencapsulated mutant of the B. anthracis Vollum strain known as V770-NP1-R. No living organisms are present in the vaccine which results in protective immunity after 3 to 6 doses. Early lots of AVA were made by Merck Sharp & Dohme and then by the Michigan Department of Public Health (MDPH). AVA remains the only FDA-licensed human anthrax vaccine in the United States and is produced by Emergent BioSolutions, formerly known as BioPort Corporation in Lansing, Michigan. The principal purchasers of the vaccine in the United States are the Department of Defense and Department of Health and Human Services. Ten million doses of AVA have been purchased for the U.S. Strategic National Stockpile for use in the event of a mass bioterrorist anthrax attack.

In 1997, the Clinton administration initiated the Anthrax Vaccine Immunization Program (AVIP), under which active U.S. service personnel were to be immunized with the vaccine. Controversy ensued since vaccination was mandatory and GAO published reports that questioned the safety and efficacy of AVA, causing sometimes serious side effects. A Congressional report also questioned the safety and efficacy of the vaccine and challenged the legality of mandatory inoculations. Mandatory vaccinations were halted in 2004 by a formal legal injunction which made numerous substantive challenges regarding the vaccine and its safety. After reviewing extensive scientific evidence, the FDA determined in 2005 that AVA is safe and effective as licensed for the prevention of anthrax, regardless of the route of exposure. In 2006, the Defense Department announced the reinstatement of mandatory anthrax vaccinations for more than 200,000 troops and defense contractors. The vaccinations are required for most U.S. military units and civilian contractors assigned to homeland bioterrorism defense or deployed in Iraq, Afghanistan or South Korea.

== Investigational anthrax vaccines ==
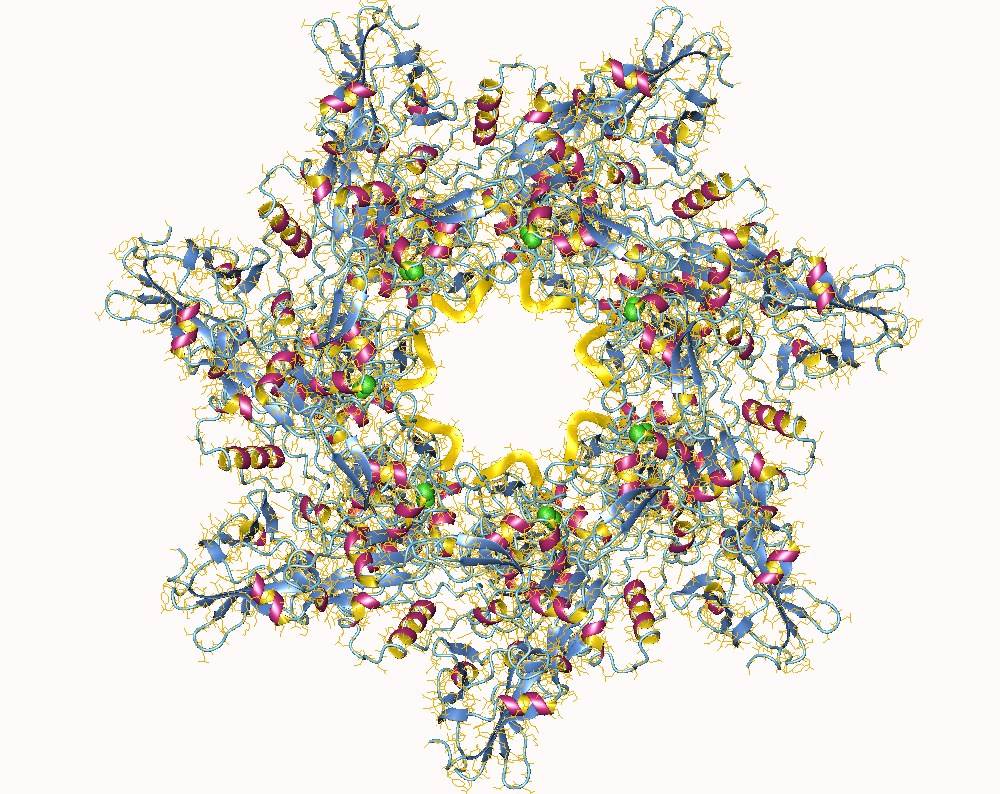
Anthrax toxin protective antigen (fragment) heptamer, Bacillus anthracis.

A number of experimental anthrax vaccines are undergoing pre-clinical testing, notably the Bacillus anthracis protective antigen—known as PA (see Anthrax toxin—combined with various adjuvants such as aluminum hydroxide (Alhydrogel), saponin QS-21, and monophosphoryl lipid A (MPL) in squalene/lecithin/Tween 80 emulsion (SLT). One dose of each formulation has provided significant protection (> 90%) against inhalational anthrax in rhesus macaques.

- Omer-2 trial: Beginning in 1998 and running for eight years, a secret Israeli project known as Omer-2 tested an Israeli investigational anthrax vaccine on 716 volunteers of the Israel Defense Forces. The vaccine—given under a seven-dose schedule—was developed by the Nes Tziona Biological Institute. A group of study volunteers complained of multi-symptom illnesses allegedly associated with the vaccine and petitioned for disability benefits to the Defense Ministry, but were denied. In February 2009, a petition from the volunteers to disclose a report about Omer-2 was filed with the Israel's High Court against the Defense Ministry, the Israel Institute for Biological Research at Nes Tziona, the director, Avigdor Shafferman, and the IDF Medical Corps. Release of the information was requested to support further action to provide disability compensation for the volunteers.
- In 2012, B. anthracis isolate H9401 was obtained from a Korean patient with gastrointestinal anthrax. The goal of the Republic of Korea is to use this strain as a challenge strain to develop a recombinant vaccine against anthrax.
