= Colman McCarthy =

American journalist (1938-2026)

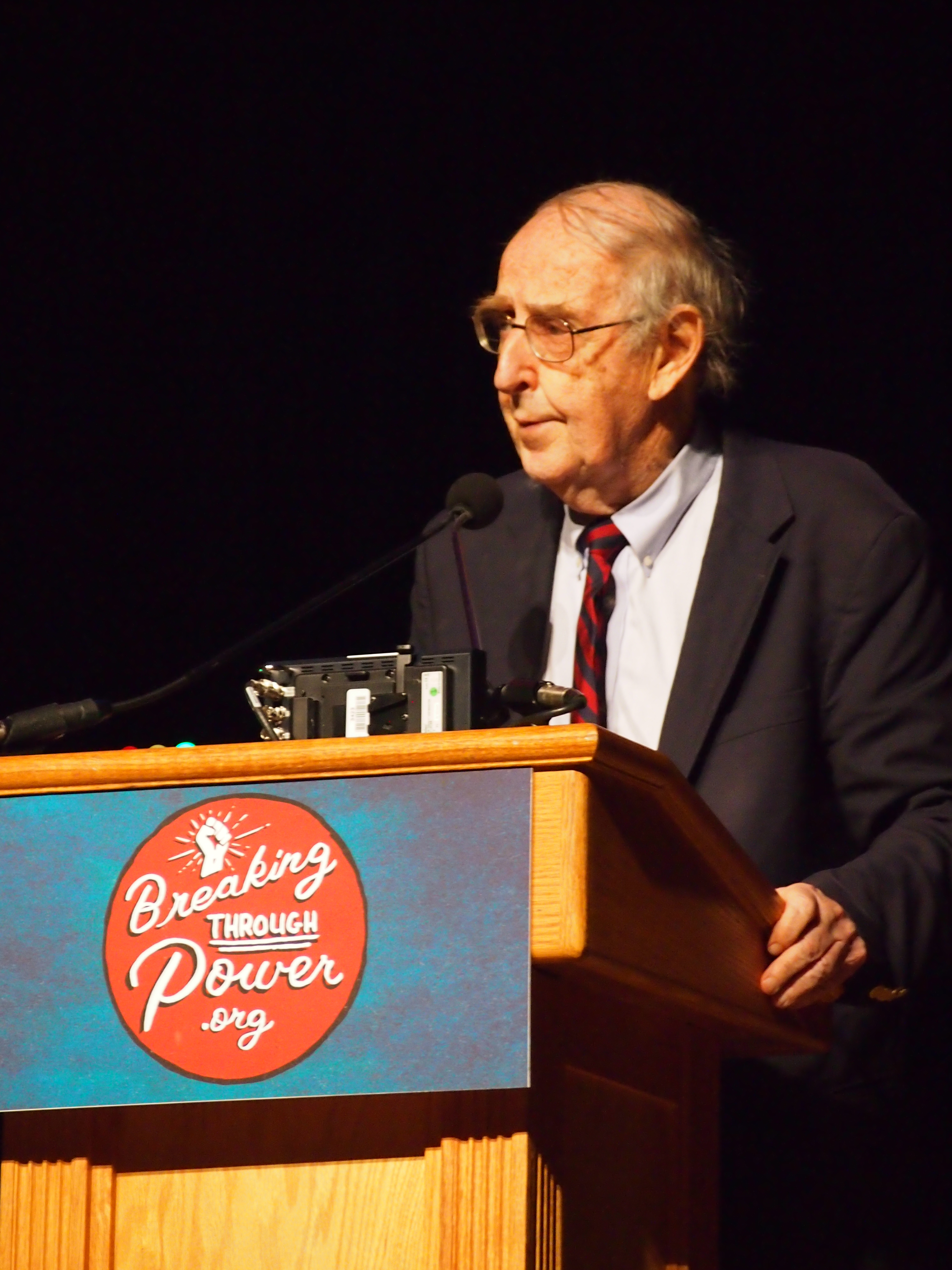
- McCarthy in 2016
- Born: March 24, 1938; New York City
- Died: February 27, 2026 (aged 87); La Romana, Dominican Republic
- Education: Spring Hill College
- Occupations: Journalist; peace activist
- Awards: El-Hibri Peace Education Prize

Colman McCarthy (March 24, 1938 – February 27, 2026) was an American journalist, teacher, lecturer, pacifist, progressive, anarchist and long-time peace activist.

== Early life ==
Colman Joseph McCarthy was born, the youngest of four brothers, in Glen Head, New York, on March 24, 1938.

== Career ==
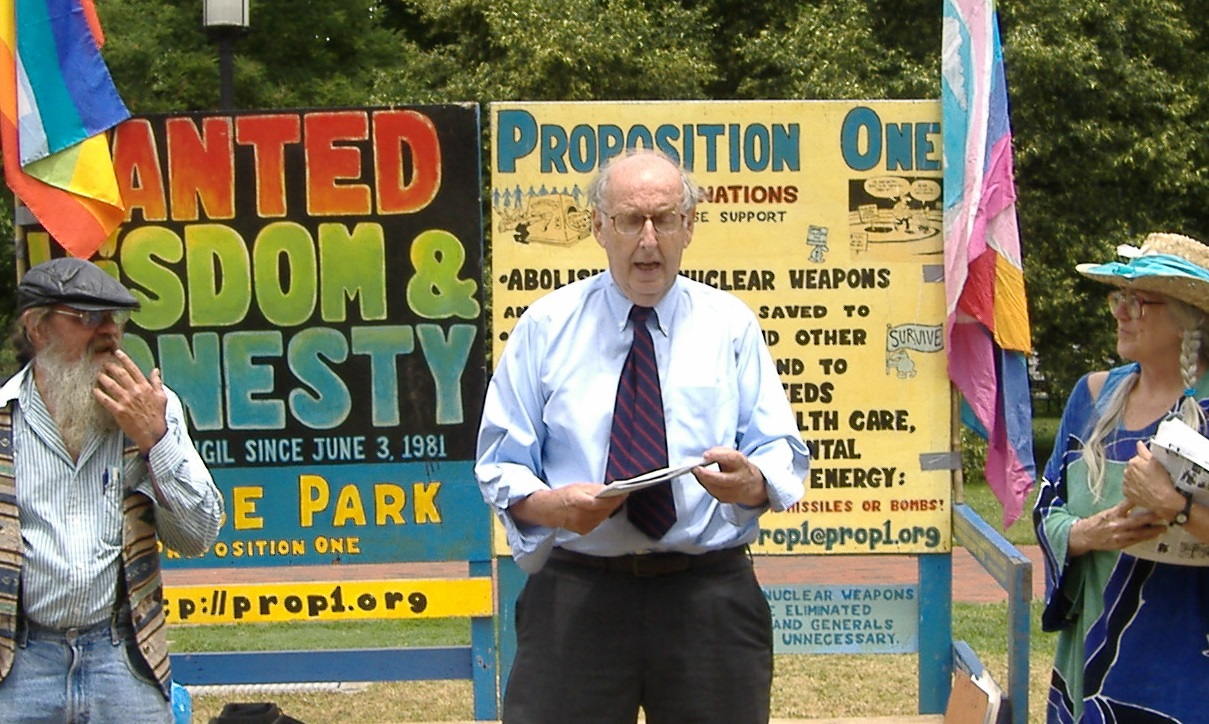
Speaking at the "White House Peace Vigil", June 4, 2006

McCarthy's educational philosophy attracted some controversy in the past, with two Bethesda-Chevy Chase High School students calling in 2006 for a more balanced presentation of the issues covered by the class.

As a pacifist, journalist, and ethical vegetarian, he was awarded the Peace Abbey Courage of Conscience Award in Sherborn, Massachusetts for his nationally syndicated column in The Washington Post. McCarthy also won an Alicia Patterson Foundation fellowship for journalism and, in 2010, the El-Hibri Peace Education Prize.

McCarthy died from complications of pneumonia on February 27, 2026, in La Romana, Dominican Republic, where he was living with his son. He was 87.

== Selected works ==
- Disturbers of the Peace: Profiles in Non Adjustment
- Inner Companions
- Pleasures of the Game
- Baseball Forever
- Involvements: One Journalist's Place in the World
- All of One Peace
- I'd Rather Teach Peace
- Strength Through Peace (editor)
- Solutions to Violence (editor)
- At Rest With the Animals
- My America (contributor)
- Contemporary Anarchist Studies (contributor)
- In the Name of Profit (contributor)
- Peace Is Possible (contributor)

== See also ==
- List of peace activists
