= Strategic Active Pharmaceutical Ingredients Reserve =

U.S. federally supported stockpile of pharmaceutical ingredients

The Strategic Active Pharmaceutical Ingredients Reserve (SAPIR) is a U.S. government–supported system designed to secure domestic access to essential active pharmaceutical ingredients (APIs). SAPIR was first developed following drug-shortage concerns during the COVID-19 pandemic and was formally strengthened through a 2025 executive order directing federal agencies to build national API reserves to reduce foreign dependence. Independent analysts have described SAPIR as a key component of U.S. pharmaceutical-supply resilience efforts.

== Background ==
In 2019, the United States Food and Drug Administration (FDA) reported that a majority of the API manufacturing facilities supplying the U.S. market were located overseas, including significant production in China and India. Many of these foreign-based manufacturers rely on chemical precursors sourced from China, further increasing U.S. dependence on overseas supply chains.

During the COVID-19 pandemic, global supply-chain disruptions led to nationwide shortages of sedatives, antibiotics, analgesics, and other essential hospital medicines. Independent analyses by health-policy researchers and national security organizations highlighted that the U.S. lacked domestic reserves of APIs and remained highly vulnerable to international supply interruptions.

In response to these vulnerabilities, the Biomedical Advanced Research and Development Authority (BARDA) and other federal agencies began exploring strategies to strengthen domestic pharmaceutical manufacturing capacity and reduce reliance on foreign sources. These federal assessments found that increased domestic API production, coupled with strategic stockpiling initiatives, could improve readiness during public-health emergencies and enhance long-term supply-chain resilience.

== Design ==
SAPIR differs from traditional stockpiles by storing APIs instead of finished medicines. APIs generally have longer shelf lives and can be converted into multiple finished dosage forms when needed.

According to federal documents, the system is intended to:

- Identify at-risk APIs through vulnerability assessments and monitoring;
- Procure and stockpile critical ingredients in U.S.-based facilities compliant with current Good Manufacturing Practice (cGMP);
- Enable rapid conversion into finished drug products through a distributed fill–finish and compounding network during emergencies.

== Implementation ==
In May 2020, the Biomedical Advanced Research and Development Authority (BARDA) awarded Phlow Corp. a contract valued at up to US$354 million to expand domestic manufacturing of active pharmaceutical ingredients (APIs) considered essential to national health security. Independent reporting described the award as part of a broader federal effort to establish a U.S.-based supply of essential medicine ingredients, including support for developing the first Strategic Active Pharmaceutical Ingredients Reserve (SAPIR).

The BARDA award enabled Phlow to establish domestic API production capabilities in Richmond, Virginia, supported by small-scale R&D laboratories and cGMP manufacturing operations. These facilities produce essential medicine ingredients using both batch and continuous-manufacturing technologies and have been described as potential domestic sources of APIs for inclusion in SAPIR.

Independent analyses have noted that the SAPIR model relies on partnerships between federal agencies and domestic manufacturers to reduce foreign dependence and maintain a stable reserve of critical pharmaceutical ingredients. Phlow’s BARDA-supported work to create a domestic manufacturing base has been cited as an example of this public–private approach.

== Independent analysis ==
Several independent analysts and professional organizations have evaluated SAPIR’s role within U.S. drug-shortage prevention and pharmaceutical-supply resilience policy. Reuters described a 2025 executive order as an effort to ensure a “resilient” supply chain for essential medicines by filling SAPIR with critical active pharmaceutical ingredients (APIs) for about 26 drugs considered vital to national health and security.

Law and policy commentators have framed the order as part of a broader strategy to bolster domestic API production and reduce dependence on foreign suppliers. Analyses from Akin Gump and Manatt note that the executive order directs the Department of Health and Human Services’ Administration for Strategic Preparedness and Response to prepare the existing SAPIR repository, develop a list of approximately 26 critical medicines, and build a six-month supply of domestically manufactured APIs where possible.

Think tanks and advocacy organizations concerned with drug shortages and national security have also highlighted SAPIR as one tool for reducing U.S. reliance on overseas API sources. The Council on Strategic Risks has described SAPIR as a pharmaceutical counterpart to the Strategic Petroleum Reserve and recommended that the stockpile be filled to mitigate the risk of severe drug shortages arising from geopolitical disruptions. The Coalition for a Prosperous America has likewise argued that a Strategic API Reserve, including SAPIR, could provide emergency stockpiles for critical compounds as part of a broader strategy to rebuild domestic pharmaceutical production.

Professional organizations representing pharmacists have generally supported the initiative. The American Society of Health-System Pharmacists has welcomed the executive order establishing SAPIR, stating that creating an API stockpile can help reduce dependence on foreign suppliers and provide domestic manufacturers with access to essential ingredients in the event of shortages or supply-chain disruptions.

== See also ==
- Strategic National Stockpile
- Biomedical Advanced Research and Development Authority
