= Anthrax Vaccine Immunization Program =

US government program

The Anthrax Vaccine Immunization Program (AVIP), is the name of the policy set forth by the U.S. federal government to immunize its military and certain civilian personnel with BioThrax, an anthrax vaccine manufactured by Emergent BioSolutions Inc. It was set up by the Clinton administration.

In June 2001, the program was halted by the DoD due to changes in the manufacturing process not approved by the Food and Drug Administration (FDA). In the wake of the 2001 anthrax attacks and long after the 2003 invasion of Iraq, all military personnel were required to receive the anthrax vaccine. In Court, it was ruled that vaccination could not be forced on military personnel without a special order by the president. Thereafter it ran into and judicial obstacles (mainly concerning the methods and viability of the vaccine).

Between March 1998 and December 2008, nearly 8 million doses of BioThrax were administered to over 2 million U.S. military personnel as part of the program. In December 2008, the FDA approved a new version of BioThrax which requires five intramuscular doses instead of six subcutaneous doses.

== Overview ==
The vaccination requirement was instituted in 1998 because of concerns that anthrax could be used as a biological weapon (see anthrax weaponization). Secretary of Defense William Cohen stated that "anthrax poses a clear and present danger to our armed forces. It is the weapon of choice for germ warfare because it is easy to weaponize and is as lethal as the Ebola virus." Anthrax had previously been used in warfare as early as World War I, against livestock, and was also tested during World War II by Japan, against Chinese civilian populations, and by the US, Canada, and Great Britain on sheep at Gruinard Island. The Japanese attack was part of a larger program of biological warfare and human experimentation that is estimated to have killed 580,000 people. The Soviet Union weaponized anthrax, and 64 people were killed in an accident at Sverdlovsk in 1979. The Japanese doomsday cult Aum Shinrikyo had carried out a successful attack using sarin and an unsuccessful one in 1993 using anthrax. Iraq was found in 1995 to have a biological weapons program that included anthrax. In 2001, shortly after 9/11, five people were killed in an anthrax attack delivered by mail to the US Senate.

The US armed forces had a longstanding custom of mandating various vaccines for service members, so the leadership expected that the vaccination requirement would be a matter of routine. But according to the director of the program, "Things have changed. They used to stand you in line, give you two or three shots, and off you went. Nobody asked what they were for. [...] There has been a ... shift in the relationship between health care providers and patients. No longer do you just put a patient in a doctor's office or in a shot line." The program included the National Guard and Reserve, whose members had less of an expectation of being subject to such a requirement or of being exposed to biological warfare.

Service members began to complain about side effects of the vaccine, and debate ensued about whether these problems were really vaccine-related. The DOD maintained that the vaccine was safe, but surveys showed that many service members did not believe the information that was being given to them about it. Treatment of troops who refused or hesitated was up to the discretion of their commanding officers, and therefore varied widely. Some were not punished at all, others acquiesced after further counseling, while still others received serious penalties such as dishonorable discharges. Following the 9/11 attacks, an exemption requested by marine James Muhammad led to his court martial, with his lawyer advising him to plead guilty because he would not be allowed to present his religious reasons and might be subject to the death penalty. The legal situation was complicated by the fact that the vaccine was experimental. Although service members are required to obey orders, it is also illegal under US law to use an experimental drug on patients without their consent. In the reserves, the requirement led many members to quit, switch to inactive status, or move to another unit. In the Air Force Reserve, a GAO report cited a negative effect on "retention of trained and experienced guard and reserve pilots."

Legal challenges and questions about safety led to the cancellation of the program in 2008.

== History ==
=== 1990s ===
In 1998, the Clinton administration required the inoculation of all military members with the anthrax vaccine known as Anthrax Vaccine Adsorbed (AVA) and by the trade name BioThrax.

In 1999 at Offutt Air Force Base, the first ever Anthrax refusal court-martial in the United States Air Force was prosecuted. In the case of U.S. v. Bickley, Captain Jeffrey A. Lustick, USAF, prosecuted an airman's refusal to submit to the immunization. The airman was convicted and later administratively separated from the U.S. Air Force.

=== 2000s ===
In June 2001, the DoD halted vaccinations due to non-FDA approved changes in BioPort's manufacturing process.

On October 15, 2001, military members filed a FDA Citizen Petition highlighting the fact that the license for AVA had never formally been finalized by the FDA in accordance with the requirements of 21 CFR § 10.30 as Docket # 01P-0471. The Petition was later utilized as the foundational basis for a Preliminary Injunction by a Federal Court to temporarily halt the program [Doe v. Rumsfeld, 297 F. Supp. 2d 119 (D.D.C. 2003)].

On June 28, 2002, in the wake of the 2001 anthrax attacks and leading up to the 2003 invasion of Iraq, all military personnel were required to receive AVA in addition to their other vaccinations of smallpox. The military does give this vaccination regularly as well as Japanese encephalitis (JEV) when the service member is to be deployed to Southeast Asia, and other vaccines such as pneumococcal, tetanus, among others.

While some military personnel had questions about the safety of the vaccine, it was considered a lawful order at that time, and this made refusing the vaccine at peril of the subordinate, including possible discharge (i.e., losing their job and any benefits depending on the type of discharge). This pressure, at least for the National Guard and Reserve pilots and crewmembers, became a deciding retention factor.

Later that month, the DOD made it policy to include any personnel spending 15 days or more in high anthrax-risk areas, such as the Persian Gulf or the Korean peninsula.

In December 2003, Judge Emmet G. Sullivan of the U.S. District Court for the District of Columbia ruled that the Department of Defense could not force military personnel to take the vaccine unless through a special order by the president.

In October 2004, for about 8 days in (October 20–28), anthrax vaccinations were resumed, but then an injunction against mandatory vaccination was filed on the basis that AVA was not proven to work against inhalation anthrax. The ruling held that the mandatory program was illegal. The DoD was now required to either let the individual member choose under an informed consent policy, or allowed the president to bypass this requirement by executive order (Doe v. Rumsfeld, 341 F. Supp. 2d 1, 6 (D.D.C. 2004)). For military members who had started the vaccination (which usually takes build-up and booster shots), they tended to continue the vaccination program under informed consent. For those who had a choice, they usually decided against it. The government stated that they will resume the vaccination program under informed consent in April 2005.

On December 15, 2005, the FDA re-issued a Final Rule & Order on the license status of AVA, clearing the way for mandatory vaccination reinstatement. After reviewing extensive scientific evidence and carefully considering comments from the public, the FDA again determined that the vaccine is licensed for the prevention of anthrax, regardless of the route of exposure. Pertaining to the previous ruling, the DC District Federal Appeals Court declined to vacate or overturn the injunction in 2006, instead mooting the case based on the FDA's new 2005 licensing of the vaccine.[Doe v. Rumsfeld, 127 Fed. App'x 327 (D.C. Cir. 2006)]

On October 16, 2006 the military announced intentions to resume vaccinations for select personnel again, but the vaccinations remained voluntary until further guidance by the DoD. The DoD's official resumption status of the program awaited publication of service messages.

On December 13, 2006, a new class-action lawsuit, filed on behalf of six unnamed plaintiffs, revived the legal battle over the military's mandatory anthrax immunization program. According to court documents, the basic premise of the lawsuit is the plaintiffs' claim that the vaccine is "unapproved for its applied/intended use." The lawsuit says that "plaintiffs will suffer substantial and irreparable injury if they are forced to take the vaccine," which the suit says has not been properly approved by the government, despite the FDA issuing its "final rule" on the vaccine on December 15, 2005. The suit also says the DOD has failed to follow presidential orders and federal laws that require the government to obtain informed consent before giving an unapproved and experimental vaccine to anyone.

On February 8, 2007, the military has resumed mandatory vaccinations of certain troops. Specific policies and troop selection varies according to branch of service.

By August 2007, the original court affirmed that the AVIP was not substantially justified prior to the consequent FDA licensure and requisite rule making for the vaccine in December 2005. The Court ultimately granted "prevailing party" status for the plaintiffs against defendants DoD and FDA [Doe v. Rumsfeld, 501 F. Supp. 2d 186, 188 (D.D.C. 2007)].

By March 2008, a different Federal Judge affirmed the prior ruling in its opinion regarding corrections of records writing, "Taken as a whole, Judge Sullivan's decisions in Doe v. Rumsfeld conclude that, prior to the FDA's December 2005 rulemaking, it was a violation of federal law for military personnel to be subjected to involuntary AVA inoculation because the vaccine was neither the subject of a presidential waiver nor licensed for use against inhalation anthrax."

By August 6, 2008, an FBI press briefing theorized that the "failing" anthrax vaccine immunization program led as the primary motivator in the fall 2001 anthrax letter attacks allegedly perpetrated by U.S. Army scientist Bruce Ivins. FBI documents reveal the FDA "suspended further production" of anthrax vaccine just prior to the attacks (Ivins' emails and FBI analysis available on pp. 12–16 of affidavit). Failed potency tests prevented FDA approval. FBI released emails by Ivins showing the vaccine "isn't passing the potency test" and that "no approved lots" were available just prior to the letter attacks. The FBI explained Ivins' involvement with the failed potency tests. FBI affidavits also documented Ivins receiving the highest Defense Department honors for "getting the anthrax vaccine back into production". The U.S. Department of Justice press statements theorized Ivins' anthrax letter attack motive: "by launching these attacks, he creates a situation, a scenario, where people all of a sudden realize the need to have this vaccine."

On October 1, 2008, Michael O. Leavitt, Secretary of Health and Human Services, declared a need "to provide targeted liability protections for anthrax countermeasures" because "I have determined there is a credible risk that the threat of exposure of B. anthracis and the resulting disease constitutes a public health emergency" until the year 2015. Emergent BioSolutions immediately prepared to supply 14.5 million doses of anthrax vaccine by 2011.

In December 2008, the FDA approved a new version of BioThrax which requires five intramuscular doses instead of six subcutaneous doses. The vaccine is required for US military members who are deployed to the Middle East, although some have objected to the vaccine because of side effects.

=== 2010s ===
On February 19, 2010, the FBI released its final summary on the Amerithrax investigation. The "motive", according to the FBI, was detailed on page 8 of the report: "Motive. According to his e-mails and statements to friends, in the months leading up to the anthrax attacks in the fall of 2001, Dr. Ivins was under intense personal and professional pressure. The anthrax vaccine program to which he had devoted his entire career of more than 20 years was failing. The anthrax vaccines were receiving criticism in several scientific circles, because of both potency problems and allegations that the anthrax vaccine contributed to Gulf War syndrome. Short of some major breakthrough or intervention, he feared that the vaccine research program was going to be discontinued. Following the anthrax attacks, however, his program was suddenly rejuvenated." The FBI continued on page 39 finding, "within a few months of the anthrax attacks, the FDA fast-tracked the approval process and approved the Anthrax Vaccine Adsorbed ("AVA"), even though it didn't meet the original potency standards. This was a significant development for the anthrax researchers."

To date, the DOD has not announced a reevaluation of the AVIP, nor consideration of correcting the records of previously punished soldiers, in light of the above-mentioned legislative, legal and criminal findings related to the anthrax vaccine.

== Pamphlet ==
This is a pamphlet distributed to military members regarding their vaccinations after the Emergency Use Authorization from the FDA after April 4, 2005.

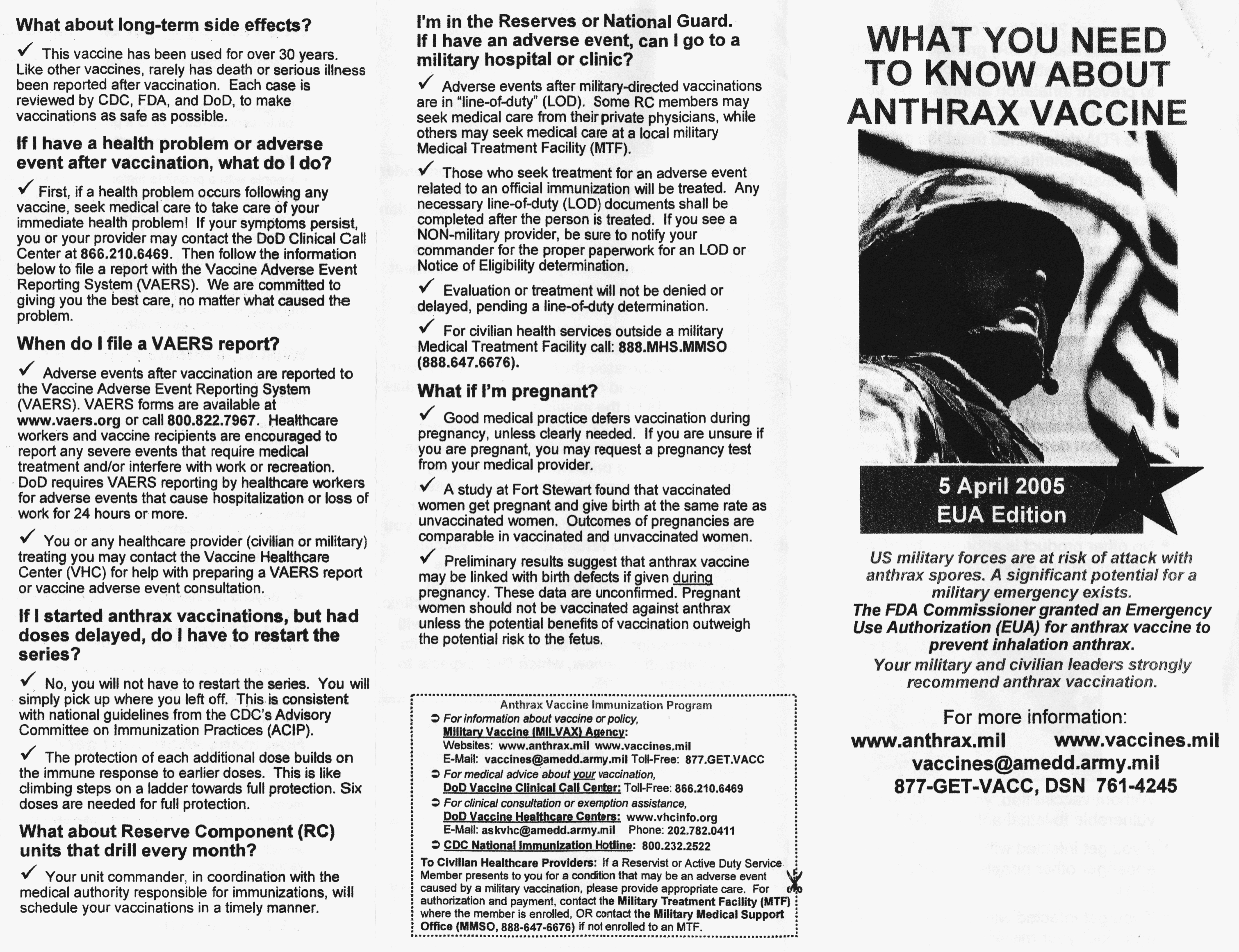
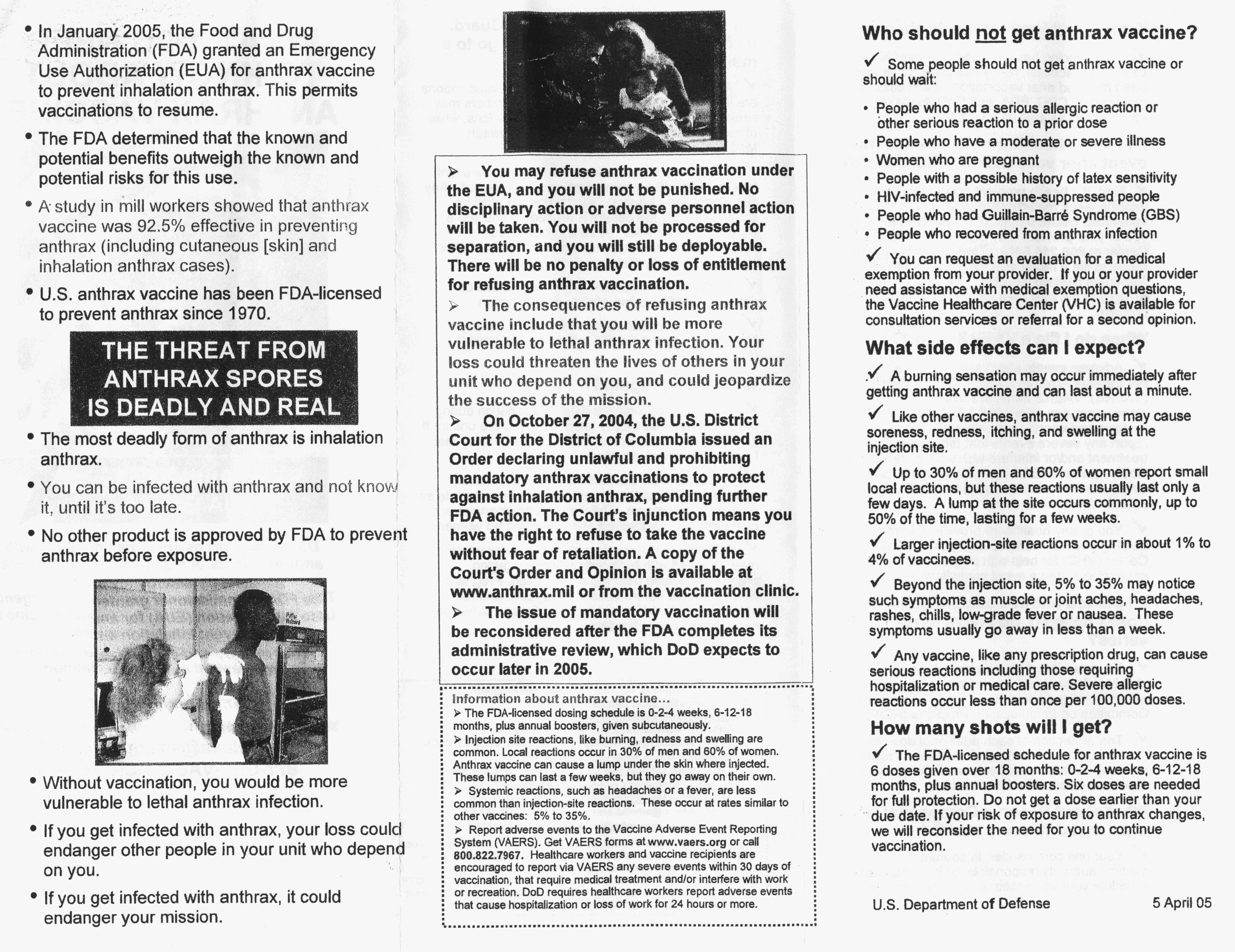

== See also ==
- Anthrax
