= Bioterrorism =

Terrorism involving biological agents

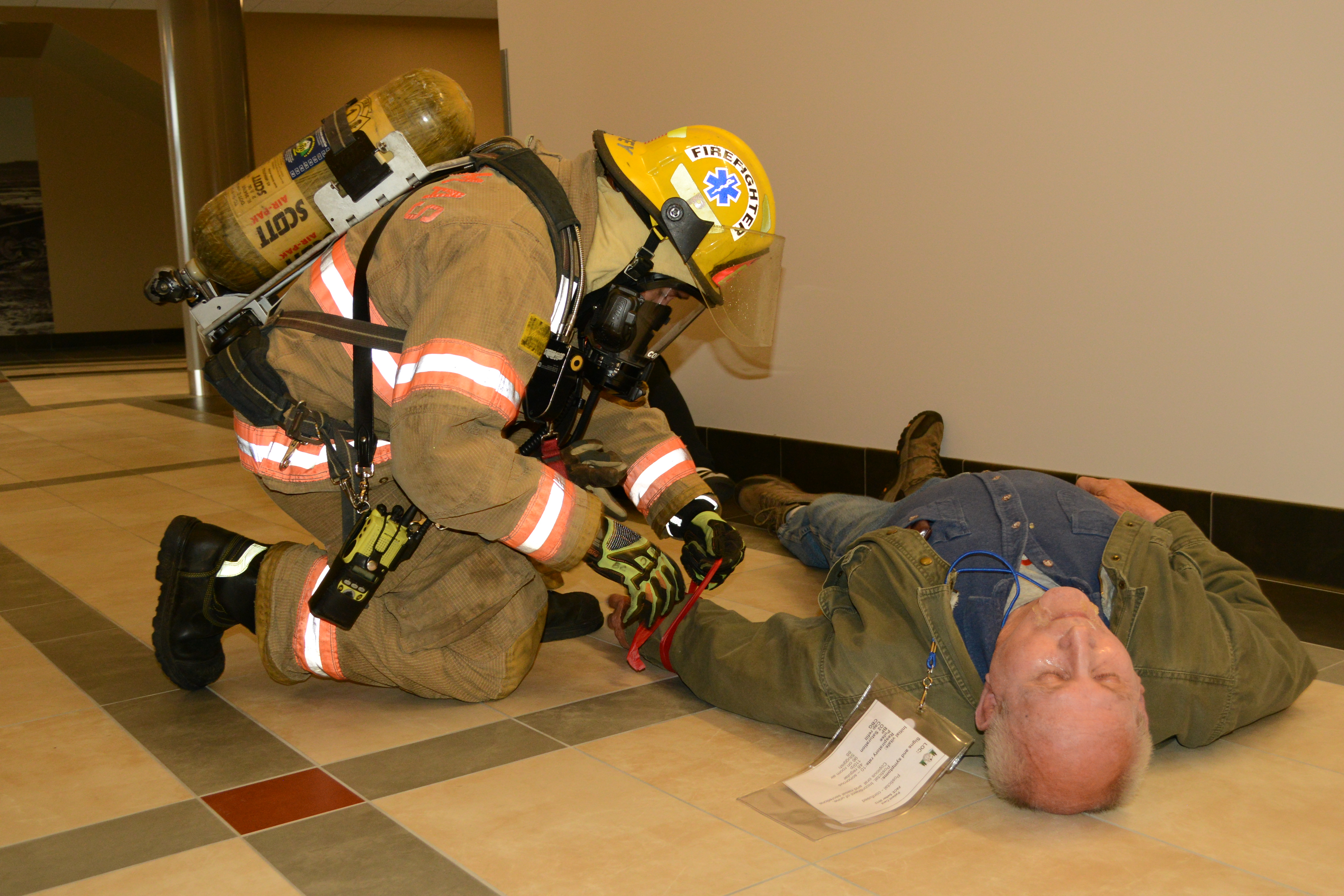
Firefighters triage victims of a simulated bioterrorism attack at the Armed Forces Reserve Center during the Portland Area Capabilities Exercise (PACE) Setter at Camp Withycombe in Clackamas, Oregon, May 22, 2013. The purpose of the PACE Setter exercise is to test regional and interagency response to public health incidents affecting multiple agencies. (Photo by Staff Sgt. April Davis, Oregon Military Department Public Affairs)

Bioterrorism is terrorism involving the intentional release or dissemination of biological agents. These agents include bacteria, viruses, insects, fungi, and/or their toxins, and may be in a naturally occurring or a human-modified form, in much the same way as in biological warfare. Further, modern agribusiness is vulnerable to anti-agricultural attacks by terrorists, and such attacks can seriously damage economy as well as consumer confidence. The latter destructive activity is called agrobioterrorism and is a subtype of agro-terrorism.

== Definition ==
Definition	Source
"Bioterrorism is the deliberate release of viruses, bacteria, toxins or other harmful agents to cause illness or death in people, animals or plants."	Interpol
"A biological attack, or bioterrorism, is the intentional release of viruses, bacteria, or other germs that can sicken or kill people, livestock, or crops."	CDC
"Violent action using living matter, such as bacteria, to harm or kill people for political reasons"	Cambridge Dictionary

Bioterrorism agents are typically found in nature, but could be mutated or altered to increase their ability to cause disease, make them resistant to current medicines, or to increase their ability to be spread into the environment. Biological agents can be spread through the air, water, or in food. Biological agents are attractive to terrorists because they are extremely difficult to detect and do not cause illness for several hours to several days. Some bioterrorism agents, like the smallpox virus, can be spread from person to person and some, like anthrax, cannot.

Bioterrorism may be favored because biological agents are relatively easy and inexpensive to obtain, can be easily disseminated, and can cause widespread fear and panic beyond the actual physical damage. Military leaders, however, have learned that, as a military asset, bioterrorism has some important limitations; it is difficult to use a bioweapon in a way that only affects the enemy and not friendly forces. A biological weapon is useful to terrorists mainly as a method of creating mass panic and disruption to a state or a country. However, technologists such as Bill Joy have warned of the potential power which genetic engineering might place in the hands of future bio-terrorists.

The use of agents that do not cause harm to humans, but disrupt the economy, have also been discussed. One such pathogen is the foot-and-mouth disease (FMD) virus, which is capable of causing widespread economic damage and public concern (as witnessed in the 2001 and 2007 FMD outbreaks in the UK), while having almost no capacity to infect humans.

== History ==
By the time World War I began, attempts to use anthrax were directed at animal populations. This generally proved to be ineffective.

Confederate Secret Service agent Dr. Luke P. Blackburn attempted to spread yellow fever in Northern cities during the American Civil War. In 1864, he traveled to Bermuda during a yellow fever epidemic and took clothing from those who died and put in trunks to be sent to Canada. From there, using paid operatives, he had trunks of these clothes shipped to Northern cities and Union-held cities like New Bern, North Carolina. Due to yellow fever only being transferable by mosquitos not being known at the time, the operation was essentially doomed to fail.

Shortly after the start of World War I, Germany launched a biological sabotage campaign in the United States, Russia, Romania, and France. At that time, Anton Dilger lived in Germany, but in 1915 he was sent to the United States carrying cultures of glanders, a virulent disease of horses and mules. Dilger set up a laboratory in his home in Chevy Chase, Maryland. He used stevedores working the docks in Baltimore to infect horses with glanders while they were waiting to be shipped to Britain. Dilger was under suspicion as being a German agent, but was never arrested. Dilger eventually fled to Madrid, Spain, where he died during the Influenza Pandemic of 1918. In 1916, the Russians arrested a German agent with similar intentions. Germany and its allies infected French cavalry horses and many of Russia's mules and horses on the Eastern Front. These actions hindered artillery and troop movements, as well as supply convoys.

In 1972, police in Chicago arrested two college students, Allen Schwander and Stephen Pera, who had planned to poison the city's water supply with typhoid and other bacteria. Schwander had founded a terrorist group, "R.I.S.E.", while Pera collected and grew cultures from the hospital where he worked. The two men fled to Cuba after being released on bail. Schwander died of natural causes in 1974, while Pera returned to the U.S. in 1975 and was put on probation.

In 1979, anthrax spores killed around 66 people after the spores were unintentionally released from a military lab near Sverdlovsk, Russia. This occurrence of inhalational anthrax had provided a majority of the knowledge scientists understand about clinical anthrax. Soviet officials and physicians claimed the epidemic was produced by the consumption of infected game meat, but further investigation proves the source of infection were the inhaled spores. There is continued discussion about the intentionality of the epidemic and some speculate it was calculated by the Soviet government.

In 1980, the World Health Organization (WHO) announced the eradication of smallpox, a highly contagious and incurable disease. Although the disease has been eliminated in the wild, frozen stocks of smallpox virus are still maintained by the governments of the United States and Russia. Disastrous consequences are feared if rogue politicians or terrorists were to get hold of the smallpox strains. Since vaccination programs are now terminated, the world population is more susceptible to smallpox than ever before.

In Oregon in 1984, followers of the Bhagwan Shree Rajneesh attempted to control a local election by incapacitating the local population. They infected salad bars in 10 restaurants, produce in grocery stores, doorknobs, and other public domains with Salmonella typhimurium bacteria in the city of The Dalles, Oregon. The attack infected 751 people with severe food poisoning and hospitalized 45 of them. There were no fatalities. This incident was the first known bioterrorist attack in the United States in the 20th century. It was also the single largest bioterrorism attack on U.S. soil.

In June 1993, the religious group Aum Shinrikyo released anthrax in Tokyo. Eyewitnesses reported a foul odor. The attack was a failure, because it did not infect a single person. The reason for this is due to the fact that the group used the vaccine strain of the bacterium. The spores which were recovered from the site of the attack showed that they were identical to an anthrax vaccine strain that was given to animals at the time. These vaccine strains are missing the genes that cause a symptomatic response.

In September and October 2001, several cases of anthrax broke out in the United States, apparently deliberately caused. Letters laced with infectious anthrax were concurrently delivered to news media offices and the U.S. Congress. The letters killed five people.

== Scenarios ==
There are multiple considerable scenarios, how terrorists might employ biological agents. In 2000, tests conducted by various US agencies showed that indoor attacks in densely populated spaces are much more serious than outdoor attacks. Such enclosed spaces are large buildings, trains, indoor arenas, theaters, malls, tunnels and similar. Contra-measures against such scenarios are building architecture and ventilation systems engineering. In 1993, sewage was spilled out into a river, subsequently drawn into the water system and affected 400,000 people in Milwaukee, Wisconsin. The disease-causing organism was cryptosporidium parvum. This man-made disaster can be a template for a terrorist scenario. Nevertheless, terrorist scenarios are considered more likely near the points of delivery than at the water sources before the water treatment. Release of biological agents is more likely for a single building or a neighborhood. Counter-measures against this scenario include the further limitation of access to the water supply systems, tunnels, and infrastructure. Agricultural crop-duster flights might be misused as delivery devices for biological agents as well. Counter-measures against this scenario are background checks of employees of crop-dusting companies and surveillance procedures.

In the most common hoax scenario, no biological agents are employed. For instance, an envelope with powder in it that says, “You've just been exposed to anthrax.” Such hoaxes have been shown to have a large psychological impact on the population.

Anti-agriculture attacks are considered to require relatively little expertise and technology. Biological agents that attack livestock, fish, vegetation, and crops are mostly not contagious to humans and are therefore easier for attackers to handle. Even a few cases of infection can disrupt a country's agricultural production and exports for months, as evidenced by FMD outbreaks.

== Types of agents ==
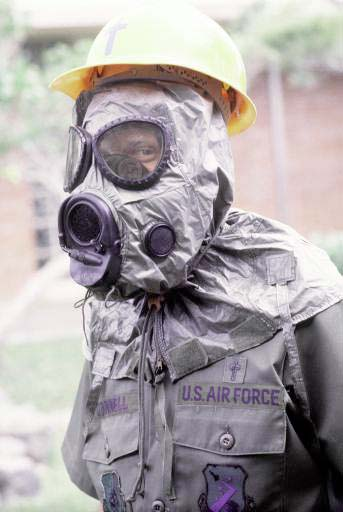
United States airman wearing an M17 nuclear, biological, and chemical warfare mask and hood

Under current United States law, bio-agents which have been declared by the U.S. Department of Health and Human Services or the U.S. Department of Agriculture to have the "potential to pose a severe threat to public health and safety" are officially defined as "select agents." The CDC categorizes these agents (A, B or C) and administers the Select Agent Program, which regulates the laboratories which may possess, use, or transfer select agents within the United States. As with US attempts to categorize harmful recreational drugs, designer viruses are not yet categorized and avian H5N1 has been shown to achieve high mortality and human-communication in a laboratory setting.

=== Category A ===
These high-priority agents pose a risk to national security, can be easily transmitted and disseminated, result in high mortality, have potential major public health impact, may cause public panic, or require special action for public health preparedness.

- SARS and COVID-19, though not as lethal as other diseases, was concerning to scientists and policymakers for its social and economic disruption potential. After the global containment of the SARS pandemic, the United States President George W. Bush stated "...A global influenza pandemic that infects millions and lasts from one to three years could be far worse."
- Tularemia or "rabbit fever": Tularemia has a very low fatality rate if treated, but can severely incapacitate. The disease is caused by the Francisella tularensis bacterium, and can be contracted through contact with fur, inhalation, ingestion of contaminated water or insect bites. Francisella tularensis is very infectious. A small number of organisms (10–50 or so) can cause disease. If F. tularensis were used as a weapon, the bacteria would likely be made airborne for exposure by inhalation. People who inhale an infectious aerosol would generally experience severe respiratory illness, including life-threatening pneumonia and systemic infection, if they are not treated. The bacteria that cause tularemia occur widely in nature and could be isolated and grown in quantity in a laboratory, although manufacturing an effective aerosol weapon would require considerable sophistication.
- Anthrax: Anthrax is a non-contagious disease caused by the spore-forming bacterium Bacillus anthracis. The ability of Anthrax to produce within small spores, or bacilli bacterium, makes it readily permeable to porous skin and can cause abrupt symptoms within 24 hours of exposure. The dispersal of this pathogen among densely populated areas is said to carry less than one percent mortality rate, for cutaneous exposure, to a ninety percent or higher mortality for untreated inhalational infections. An anthrax vaccine does exist but requires many injections for stable use. When discovered early, anthrax can be cured by administering antibiotics (such as ciprofloxacin). Its first modern incidence in biological warfare were when Scandinavian "freedom fighters" supplied by the German General Staff used anthrax with unknown results against the Imperial Russian Army in Finland in 1916. In 1993, the Aum Shinrikyo used anthrax in an unsuccessful attempt in Tokyo with zero fatalities. Anthrax was used in a series of attacks by a microbiologist at the US Army Medical Research Institute of Infectious Diseases on the offices of several United States senators in late 2001. The anthrax was in a powder form and it was delivered by the mail. This bioterrorist attack inevitably prompted seven cases of cutaneous anthrax and eleven cases of inhalation anthrax, with five leading to deaths. Additionally, an estimated 10 to 26 cases had prevented fatality through treatment supplied to over 30,000 individuals. Anthrax is one of the few biological agents that federal employees have been vaccinated for. In the US an anthrax vaccine, Anthrax Vaccine Adsorbed (AVA) exists and requires five injections for stable use. Other anthrax vaccines also exist. The strain used in the 2001 anthrax attacks was identical to the strain used by the USAMRIID.
- Smallpox: Smallpox is a highly contagious virus. It is transmitted easily through the atmosphere and has a high mortality rate (20–40%). Smallpox was eradicated in the world in the 1970s, thanks to a worldwide vaccination program. However, some virus samples are still available in Russian and American laboratories. Some believe that after the collapse of the Soviet Union, cultures of smallpox have become available in other countries. Although people born pre-1970 will have been vaccinated for smallpox under the WHO program, the effectiveness of vaccination is limited since the vaccine provides high level of immunity for only 3 to 5 years. Revaccination's protection lasts longer. As a biological weapon smallpox is dangerous because of the highly contagious nature of both the infected and their pox. Also, the infrequency with which vaccines are administered among the general population since the eradication of the disease would leave most people unprotected in the event of an outbreak. Smallpox occurs only in humans, and has no external hosts or vectors.
- Botulinum toxin: The neurotoxin Botulinum is the deadliest toxin known to man, and is produced by the bacterium Clostridium botulinum. Botulism causes death by respiratory failure and paralysis. Furthermore, the toxin is readily available worldwide due to its cosmetic applications in injections.
- Bubonic plague: Plague is a disease caused by the Yersinia pestis bacterium. Rodents are the normal host of plague, and the disease is transmitted to humans by flea bites and occasionally by aerosol in the form of pneumonic plague. The disease has a history of use in biological warfare dating back many centuries, and is considered a threat due to its ease of culture and ability to remain in circulation among local rodents for a long period of time. The weaponized threat comes mainly in the form of pneumonic plague (infection by inhalation) It was the disease that caused the Black Death in medieval Europe.
- Viral hemorrhagic fevers: This includes hemorrhagic fevers caused by members of the family Filoviridae (Marburg virus and Ebola virus), and by the family Arenaviridae (for example Lassa virus and Machupo virus). Ebola virus disease, in particular, has caused high fatality rates ranging from 25 to 90% with a 50% average. No cure currently exists, although vaccines are in development. The Soviet Union investigated the use of filoviruses for biological warfare, and the Aum Shinrikyo group unsuccessfully attempted to obtain cultures of Ebola virus. Death from Ebola virus disease is commonly due to multiple organ failure and hypovolemic shock. Marburg virus was first discovered in Marburg, Germany. No treatments currently exist aside from supportive care. The arenaviruses have a somewhat reduced case-fatality rate compared to disease caused by filoviruses, but are more widely distributed, chiefly in central Africa and South America.

=== Category B ===
Category B agents are moderately easy to disseminate and have low mortality rates.

- Brucellosis (Brucella species)
- Epsilon toxin of Clostridium perfringens
- Food safety threats (for example, Salmonella species, E coli O157:H7, Shigella, Staphylococcus aureus)
- Glanders (Burkholderia mallei)
- Melioidosis (Burkholderia pseudomallei)
- Psittacosis (Chlamydia psittaci)
- Q fever (Coxiella burnetii)
- Ricin toxin from Ricinus communis (castor beans)
- Abrin toxin from Abrus precatorius (Rosary peas)
- Staphylococcal enterotoxin B
- Typhus (Rickettsia prowazekii)
- Viral encephalitis (alphaviruses, for example,: Venezuelan equine encephalitis, eastern equine encephalitis, western equine encephalitis)
- Water supply threats (for example, Vibrio cholerae, Cryptosporidium parvum)

=== Category C ===
Category C agents are emerging pathogens that might be engineered for mass dissemination because of their availability, ease of production and dissemination, high mortality rate, or ability to cause a major health impact.

- Nipah virus
- Hantavirus

== Planning and monitoring ==
Planning may involve the development of biological identification systems. Until recently in the United States, most biological defense strategies have been geared to protecting soldiers on the battlefield rather than ordinary people in cities. Financial cutbacks have limited the tracking of disease outbreaks. Some outbreaks, such as food poisoning due to E. coli or Salmonella, could be of either natural or deliberate origin.

Global defense strategies have also been put into place including the introduction of the Biological and Toxin Weapons Convention in 1975. A majority of countries across the globe participated in the conventions (144) but a handful chose not to take part in the defense. Many of the countries who opted out of the convention are located in the Middle East and former Soviet Union countries.

=== Preparedness ===
Export controls on biological agents are not applied uniformly, providing terrorists a route for acquisition. Laboratories are working on advanced detection systems to provide early warning, identify contaminated areas and populations at risk, and to facilitate prompt treatment. Methods for predicting the use of biological agents in urban areas as well as assessing the area for the hazards associated with a biological attack are being established in major cities. In addition, forensic technologies are working on identifying biological agents, their geographical origins and/or their initial source. Efforts include decontamination technologies to restore facilities without causing additional environmental concerns.

Early detection and rapid response to bioterrorism depend on close cooperation between public health authorities and law enforcement; however, such cooperation is lacking. National detection assets and vaccine stockpiles are not useful if local and state officials do not have access to them.

Aspects of protection against bioterrorism in the United States include:

- Detection and resilience strategies in combating bioterrorism. This occurs primarily through the efforts of the Office of Health Affairs (OHA), a part of the Department of Homeland Security (DHS), whose role is to prepare for an emergency situation that impacts the health of the American populace. Detection has two primary technological factors. First there is OHA's BioWatch program in which collection devices are disseminated to thirty high risk areas throughout the country to detect the presence of aerosolized biological agents before symptoms present in patients. This is significant primarily because it allows a more proactive response to a disease outbreak rather than the more passive treatment of the past.
- Implementation of the Generation-3 automated detection system. This advancement is significant simply because it enables action to be taken in four to six hours due to its automatic response system, whereas the previous system required aerosol detectors to be manually transported to laboratories. Resilience is a multifaceted issue as well, as addressed by OHA. One way in which this is ensured is through exercises that establish preparedness; programs like the Anthrax Response Exercise Series exist to ensure that, regardless of the incident, all emergency personnel will be aware of the role they must fill. Moreover, by providing information and education to public leaders, emergency medical services and all employees of the DHS, OHS suggests it can significantly decrease the impact of bioterrorism.
- Enhancing the technological capabilities of first responders is accomplished through numerous strategies. The first of these strategies was developed by the Science and Technology Directorate (S&T) of DHS to ensure that the danger of suspicious powders could be effectively assessed, (as many dangerous biological agents such as anthrax exist as a white powder). By testing the accuracy and specificity of commercially available systems used by first responders, the hope is that all biologically harmful powders can be rendered ineffective.
- Enhanced equipment for first responders. One recent advancement is the commercialization of a new form of Tyvex™ armor which protects first responders and patients from chemical and biological contaminants. There has also been a new generation of Self-Contained Breathing Apparatuses (SCBA) which has been recently made more robust against bioterrorism agents. All of these technologies combine to form what seems like a relatively strong deterrent to bioterrorism. However, New York City as an entity has numerous organizations and strategies that effectively serve to deter and respond to bioterrorism as it comes. From here the logical progression is into the realm of New York City's specific strategies to prevent bioterrorism.
- Excelsior Challenge. In the second week of September 2016, the state of New York held a large emergency response training exercise called the Excelsior Challenge, with over 100 emergency responders participating. According to WKTV, "This is the fourth year of the Excelsior Challenge, a training exercise designed for police and first responders to become familiar with techniques and practices should a real incident occur." The event was held over three days and hosted by the State Preparedness Training Center in Oriskany, New York. Participants included bomb squads, canine handlers, tactical team officers and emergency medical services. In an interview with Homeland Preparedness News, Bob Stallman, assistant director at the New York State Preparedness Training Center, said, "We're constantly seeing what's happening around the world and we tailor our training courses and events for those types of real-world events." For the first time, the 2016 training program implemented New York's new electronic system. The system, called NY Responds, electronically connects every county in New York to aid in disaster response and recovery. As a result, "counties have access to a new technology known as Mutualink, which improves interoperability by integrating telephone, radio, video, and file-sharing into one application to allow local emergency staff to share real-time information with the state and other counties." The State Preparedness Training Center in Oriskany was designed by the State Division of Homeland Security, and Emergency Services (DHSES) in 2006. It cost $42 million to construct on over 1100 acres and is available for training 360 days a year. Students from SUNY Albany's College of Emergency Preparedness, Homeland Security and Cybersecurity, were able to participate in this year's exercise and learn how "DHSES supports law enforcement specialty teams."
- Project BioShield. The accrual of vaccines and treatments for potential biological threats, also known as medical countermeasures has been an important aspect in preparing for a potential bioterrorist attack; this took the form of a program beginning in 2004, referred to as Project BioShield. The significance of this program should not be overlooked as “there is currently enough smallpox vaccine to inoculate every United States citizen and a variety of therapeutic drugs to treat the infected.” The Department of Defense also has a variety of laboratories currently working to increase the quantity and efficacy of countermeasures that comprise the national stockpile. Efforts have also been taken to ensure that these medical countermeasures can be disseminated effectively in the event of a bioterrorist attack. The National Association of Chain Drug Stores championed this cause by encouraging the participation of the private sector in improving the distribution of such countermeasures if required.

On a CNN news broadcast in 2011, the CNN chief medical correspondent, Dr. Sanjay Gupta, weighed in on the American government's recent approach to bioterrorist threats. He explains how, even though the United States would be better fending off bioterrorist attacks now than they would be a decade ago, the amount of money available to fight bioterrorism over the last three years has begun to decrease. Looking at a detailed report that examined the funding decrease for bioterrorism in fifty-one American cities, Dr. Gupta stated that the cities "wouldn't be able to distribute vaccines as well" and "wouldn't be able to track viruses." He also said that film portrayals of global pandemics, such as Contagion, were actually quite possible and may occur in the United States under the right conditions.

A news broadcast by MSNBC in 2010 also stressed the low levels of bioterrorism preparedness in the United States. The broadcast stated that a bipartisan report gave the Obama administration a failing grade for its efforts to respond to a bioterrorist attack. The news broadcast invited the former New York City police commissioner, Howard Safir, to explain how the government would fare in combating such an attack. He said how "biological and chemical weapons are probable and relatively easy to disperse." Furthermore, Safir thought that efficiency in bioterrorism preparedness is not necessarily a question of money, but is instead dependent on putting resources in the right places. The broadcast suggested that the nation was not ready for something more serious.

In a September 2016 interview conducted by Homeland Preparedness News, Daniel Gerstein, a senior policy researcher for the RAND Corporation, stresses the importance in preparing for potential bioterrorist attacks on the nation. He implored the U.S. government to take the proper and necessary actions to implement a strategic plan of action to save as many lives as possible and to safeguard against potential chaos and confusion. He believes that because there have been no significant instances of bioterrorism since the anthrax attacks in 2001, the government has allowed itself to become complacent making the country that much more vulnerable to unsuspecting attacks, thereby further endangering the lives of U.S. citizens.

Gerstein formerly served in the Science and Technology Directorate of the Department of Homeland Security from 2011 to 2014. He claims there has not been a serious plan of action since 2004 during George W. Bush's presidency, in which he issued a Homeland Security directive delegating responsibilities among various federal agencies. He also stated that the blatant mishandling of the Ebola virus outbreak in 2014 attested to the government's lack of preparation. This past May, legislation that would create a national defense strategy was introduced in the Senate, coinciding with the timing of ISIS-affiliated terrorist groups get closer to weaponizing biological agents. In May 2016, Kenyan officials apprehended two members of an Islamic extremist group in motion to set off a biological bomb containing anthrax. Mohammed Abdi Ali, the believed leader of the group, who was a medical intern, was arrested along with his wife, a medical student. The two were caught just before carrying out their plan. The Blue Ribbon Study Panel on Biodefense, which comprises a group of experts on national security and government officials, in which Gerstein had previously testified to, submitted its National Blueprint for Biodefense to Congress in October 2015 listing their recommendations for devising an effective plan.

Bill Gates said in a February 18, 2017 Business Insider op-ed (published near the time of his Munich Security Conference speech) that it is possible for an airborne pathogen to kill at least 30 million people over the course of a year. In a New York Times report, the Gates Foundation predicted that a modern outbreak similar to the Spanish Influenza pandemic (which killed between 50 million and 100 million people) could end up killing more than 360 million people worldwide, even considering widespread availability of vaccines and other healthcare tools. The report cited increased globalization, rapid international air travel, and urbanization as increased reasons for concern. In a March 9, 2017, interview with CNBC, former U.S. Senator Joe Lieberman, who was co-chair of the bipartisan Blue Ribbon Study Panel on Biodefense, said a worldwide pandemic could end the lives of more people than a nuclear war. Lieberman also expressed worry that a terrorist group like ISIS could develop a synthetic influenza strain and introduce it to the world to kill civilians. In July 2017, Robert C. Hutchinson, former agent at the Department of Homeland Security, called for a "whole-of-government" response to the next global health threat, which he described as including strict security procedures at our borders and proper execution of government preparedness plans.

Also, novel approaches in biotechnology, such as synthetic biology, could be used in the future to design new types of biological warfare agents. Special attention has to be laid on future experiments (of concern) that:

1. Would demonstrate how to render a vaccine ineffective;
2. Would confer resistance to therapeutically useful antibiotics or antiviral agents;
3. Would enhance the virulence of a pathogen or render a nonpathogen virulent;
4. Would increase transmissibility of a pathogen;
5. Would alter the host range of a pathogen;
6. Would enable the evasion of diagnostic/detection tools;
7. Would enable the weaponization of a biological agent or toxin

Most of the biosecurity concerns in synthetic biology, however, are focused on the role of DNA synthesis and the risk of producing genetic material of lethal viruses (e.g. 1918 Spanish flu, polio) in the lab. The CRISPR/Cas system has emerged as a promising technique for gene editing. It was hailed by The Washington Post as "the most important innovation in the synthetic biology space in nearly 30 years." While other methods take months or years to edit gene sequences, CRISPR speeds that time up to weeks. However, due to its ease of use and accessibility, it has raised a number of ethical concerns, especially surrounding its use in the biohacking space.

=== Biosurveillance ===
In 1999, the University of Pittsburgh's Center for Biomedical Informatics deployed the first automated bioterrorism detection system, called RODS (Real-Time Outbreak Disease Surveillance). RODS is designed to collect data from many data sources and use them to perform signal detection, that is, to detect a possible bioterrorism event at the earliest possible moment. RODS, and other systems like it, collect data from sources including clinic data, laboratory data, and data from over-the-counter drug sales. In 2000, Michael Wagner, the codirector of the RODS laboratory, and Ron Aryel, a subcontractor, conceived the idea of obtaining live data feeds from "non-traditional" (non-health-care) data sources. The RODS laboratory's first efforts eventually led to the establishment of the National Retail Data Monitor, a system which collects data from 20,000 retail locations nationwide.

On February 5, 2002, George W. Bush visited the RODS laboratory and used it as a model for a $300 million spending proposal to equip all 50 states with biosurveillance systems. In a speech delivered at the nearby Masonic temple, Bush compared the RODS system to a modern "DEW" line (referring to the Cold War ballistic missile early warning system).

The principles and practices of biosurveillance, a new interdisciplinary science, were defined and described in the Handbook of Biosurveillance, edited by Michael Wagner, Andrew Moore and Ron Aryel, and published in 2006. Biosurveillance is the science of real-time disease outbreak detection. Its principles apply to both natural and man-made epidemics (bioterrorism).

Data which potentially could assist in early detection of a bioterrorism event include many categories of information. Health-related data such as that from hospital computer systems, clinical laboratories, electronic health record systems, medical examiner record-keeping systems, 911 call center computers, and veterinary medical record systems could be of help; researchers are also considering the utility of data generated by ranching and feedlot operations, food processors, drinking water systems, school attendance recording, and physiologic monitors, among others.

In Europe, disease surveillance is beginning to be organized on the continent-wide scale needed to track a biological emergency. The system not only monitors infected persons, but attempts to discern the origin of the outbreak.

Researchers have experimented with devices to detect the existence of a threat:

- Tiny electronic chips that would contain living nerve cells to warn of the presence of bacterial toxins (identification of broad range toxins)
- Fiber-optic tubes lined with antibodies coupled to light-emitting molecules (identification of specific pathogens, such as anthrax, botulinum, ricin)

Some research shows that ultraviolet avalanche photodiodes offer the high gain, reliability and robustness needed to detect anthrax and other bioterrorism agents in the air. The fabrication methods and device characteristics were described at the 50th Electronic Materials Conference in Santa Barbara on June 25, 2008. Details of the photodiodes were also published in the February 14, 2008, issue of the journal Electronics Letters and the November 2007 issue of the journal IEEE Photonics Technology Letters.

The United States Department of Defense conducts global biosurveillance through several programs, including the Global Emerging Infections Surveillance and Response System.

Another powerful tool developed within New York City for use in countering bioterrorism is the development of the New York City Syndromic Surveillance System. This system is essentially a way of tracking disease progression throughout New York City, and was developed by the New York City Department of Health and Mental Hygiene (NYC DOHMH) in the wake of the 9/11 attacks. The system works by tracking the symptoms of those taken into the emergency department—based on the location of the hospital to which they are taken and their home address—and assessing any patterns in symptoms. These established trends can then be observed by medical epidemiologists to determine if there are any disease outbreaks in any particular locales; maps of disease prevalence can then be created rather easily. This is an obviously beneficial tool in fighting bioterrorism as it provides a means through which such attacks could be discovered in their nascence; assuming bioterrorist attacks result in similar symptoms across the board, this strategy allows New York City to respond immediately to any bioterrorist threats that they may face with some level of alacrity.

== Response to bioterrorism incident or threat ==
Government agencies which would be called on to respond to a bioterrorism incident would include law enforcement, hazardous materials and decontamination units, and emergency medical units, if available.

The US military has specialized units, which can respond to a bioterrorism event; among them are the United States Marine Corps' Chemical Biological Incident Response Force and the U.S. Army's 20th Support Command (CBRNE), which can detect, identify, and neutralize threats, and decontaminate victims exposed to bioterror agents. US response would include the Centers for Disease Control.

Historically, governments and authorities have relied on quarantines to protect their populations. International bodies such as the World Health Organization already devote some of their resources to monitoring epidemics and have served clearing-house roles in historical epidemics.

Media attention toward the seriousness of biological attacks increased in 2013 to 2014. In July 2013, Forbes published an article with the title "Bioterrorism: A Dirty Little Threat With Huge Potential Consequences." In November 2013, Fox News reported on a new strain of botulism, saying that the Centers for Disease and Control lists botulism as one of two agents that have "the highest risks of mortality and morbidity", noting that there is no antidote for botulism. USA Today reported that the U.S. military in November was trying to develop a vaccine for troops from the bacteria that cause the disease Q fever, an agent the military once used as a biological weapon. In February 2014, the former special assistant and senior director for biodefense policy to President George W. Bush called the bioterrorism risk imminent and uncertain and Congressman Bill Pascrell called for increasing federal measures against bioterrorism as a "matter of life or death." The New York Times wrote a story saying the United States would spend $40 million to help certain low and middle-income countries deal with the threats of bioterrorism and infectious diseases.

Bioterrorism can additionally harm the psychological aspect of victims and the general public. Victims exposed to biological weapons have shown an increased presence of clinical anxiety compared to the normal population.

Bill Gates has warned that bioterrorism could kill more people than nuclear war.

In February 2018, a CNN employee discovered on an airplane a "sensitive, top-secret document in the seatback pouch explaining how the Department of Homeland Security would respond to a bioterrorism attack at the Super Bowl."

=== 2017 U.S. budget proposal affecting bioterrorism programs ===
President Donald Trump promoted his first budget around keeping America safe. However, one aspect of defense would receive less money: "protecting the nation from deadly pathogens, man-made or natural," according to The New York Times. Agencies tasked with biosecurity get a decrease in funding under the Administration's budget proposal.

For example:

- The Office of Public Health Preparedness and Response would be cut by $136 million, or 9.7 percent. The office tracks outbreaks of disease.
- The National Center for Emerging and Zoonotic Infectious Diseases would be cut by $65 million, or 11 percent. The center is a branch of the Centers for Disease Control and Prevention that fights threats like anthrax and the Ebola virus, and additionally towards research on HIV/AIDS vaccines.
- Within the National Institutes of Health, the National Institute of Allergy and Infectious Diseases (NIAID) would lose 18 percent of its budget. NIAID oversees responses to Zika, Ebola and HIV/AIDS vaccine research.

"The next weapon of mass destruction may not be a bomb," Lawrence O. Gostin, the director of the World Health Organization's Collaborating Center on Public Health Law and Human Rights, told The New York Times. "It may be a tiny pathogen that you can't see, smell or taste, and by the time we discover it, it'll be too late."

=== Lack of international standards on public health experiments ===
Tom Inglesy, the CEO and director of the Center for Health Security at the Johns Hopkins Bloomberg School of Public Health and an internationally recognized expert on public health preparedness, pandemic and emerging infectious disease said in 2017 that the lack of an internationally standardized approval process that could be used to guide countries in conducting public health experiments for resurrecting a disease that has already been eradicated increases the risk that the disease could be used in bioterrorism. This was in reference to the lab synthesis of horsepox in 2017 by researchers at the University of Alberta. The researchers recreated horsepox, an extinct cousin of the smallpox virus, in order to research new ways to treat cancer.

== See also ==
- Biodefence
- Biological Weapons Convention
- Biorisk
- Biosecurity
- Biological warfare#Genetics
- Biosafety level
- Project Bacchus
- Select agent
- Global Health Security Initiative
- Biosafety level#List of BSL-4 facilities
- Reassortment
