= Emergent BioSolutions =

U.S.-based biopharmaceutical company

Emergent BioSolutions Inc.
- Type: Public
- Traded as: NYSE: EBS; Russell 2000 component
- Founded: September 5, 1998; 28 years ago (as BioPort Inc.)
- Founder: Fuad El-Hibri
- Headquarters: Gaithersburg, Maryland, U.S.
- Key people: Joseph C. Papa (CEO); Zsolt Harsanyi (chairman)
- Revenue: ▼US$1.05 billion (2023)
- Operating income: ▼US$−726 million (2023)
- Net income: ▼US$−761 million (2023)
- Total assets: ▼US$1.82 billion (2023)
- Total equity: ▼US$649 million (2023)
- Number of employees: 1,600 (2023)
- Website: emergentbiosolutions.com

Emergent BioSolutions Inc. is an American multinational specialty biopharmaceutical company headquartered in Gaithersburg, Maryland. It develops vaccines and antibody therapeutics for infectious diseases and opioid overdoses, and it provides medical devices for biodefense purposes.

Among the company's products are the controversial BioThrax (Anthrax Vaccine Adsorbed), the only anthrax vaccine licensed by the U.S. Food and Drug Administration (FDA) and Narcan (naloxone) for the emergency treatment of opioid overdose. The company also manufactures pharmaceuticals for infectious diseases like cholera and typhoid.

During the COVID-19 pandemic, Emergent BioSolutions also produced Johnson & Johnson/Janssen and Oxford–AstraZeneca vaccines at one of its plants; however, this was marked by contamination and other production issues, and millions of doses of vaccine had to be discarded.

== History ==
=== Early history ===
Emergent BioSolutions was founded on September 5, 1998, by Fuad El-Hibri, under the name BioPort, which had formerly operated as a state-owned entity named Michigan Biological Products Institute and was privatized as Emergent BioSolutions in 2004. At the time, the Michigan Department of Public Health, through its Michigan Biologics Products Institute, owned an anthrax vaccine manufacturing facility in Lansing, Michigan. BioPort purchased the facility and the rights to manufacture the vaccine for the U.S. military.

In 2000, operating as Bioport, the company was the subject of Congressional hearings and FDA action (official action indicated (OAI) and voluntary action indicated (VAI)). After the 2001 anthrax attacks that caused the deaths of five Americans and made 17 others ill, Bioport began providing its anthrax vaccine to US biodefense agencies.

Emergent became a publicly traded company in 2006, with its stock trading on the New York Stock Exchange under the symbol EBS.

=== Mergers, acquisitions and joint ventures ===
In June 2012, Emergent, along with Novartis and the Texas A&M University System was selected by the U.S. Department of Health and Human Services as one of the three Centers for Innovation in Advanced Development and Manufacturing. The public-private partnership granted Emergent $163 million over eight years to assist in the development of countermeasures for health, nuclear and radiological epidemics. The purpose is to produce medical countermeasures in the event of a national pandemic. Emergent's facility is located in Maryland and the company expects the site to be operational by the year 2020.

The company purchased Winnipeg, Manitoba's Cangene Corporation in 2013. Cangene's leading product is WinRho, which treats the blood disease immune thrombocytopenic purpura, as well as hemolytic disease of the newborn. Cangene also produces pharmaceuticals that treat Hepatitis B and varicella (chickenpox).

On June 27, 2016, the US Biomedical Advanced Research and Development Authority contracted with Emergent Biosolutions to develop a vaccine for the Zika virus. The contract was spread out over 30 months and was worth around $22 million. The vaccine was projected to reach stage-one clinical trials by early 2017. As of the end of June 2016, 60 countries and territories had reported transmission of the Zika virus from mosquitoes. Emergent was one of the first companies to develop a vaccine for the virus.

Emergent spun off its biosciences division in August 2016, forming a new company, Aptevo Therapeutics in Seattle, WA. The new company continues its focus on developing treatments for cancer and blood diseases using its technology of dual-ended molecules that assault cancer cells, each end attacking the cancer in a different way. Aptevo had four products available at its inception.

In December 2016, Health Canada approved the purchase of Emergent's new botulism antitoxin called Botulism Antitoxin Heptavalent (BAT). The CDC and Public Health Agency of Canada both identified botulism, a type of food poisoning, as a likely biological threat. Emergent already has a ten-year contract with the Canadian military and national health service to supply BAT that began in 2012. Emergent also provides BAT to the U.S. Strategic National Stockpile. BAT was first licensed in the U.S. in 2013 and is the only botulism antitoxin available in the U.S. for naturally occurring cases of non-infant botulism.

On March 31, 2017, Emergent signed a modification to its contract with BARDA to "manufacture and store bulk drug substance for its botulism antitoxin, BAT." The contract is valued at approximately $53 million for five years. The contract modification was technical in nature; it allows Emergent to file and deliver the final drug product to the Strategic National Stockpile in the future.

Soligenix Inc. and Emergent agreed to establish a "commercially viable production technology" for the development of RiVax, a potential vaccine aimed to protect against ricin exposure. Currently, there are no treatments for ricin poisoning that have been proven effective. Soligenix is a late-stage biopharmaceutical company that specializes in the development of treatments for rare diseases. A product of castor oil production, the ricin toxin can be a useful biological weapon due to its extreme potency, stability, and accessibility. The National Institute of Allergy and Infectious Diseases funded the development of RiVax costing an estimated $24.7 million. The organization also financially backed the contract between Emergent and Soligenix. Most of the work was conducted in Baltimore, Maryland, at Emergent's manufacturing facility. An expansion of the Baltimore plant, finished in 2017, had $163 million in funding from the U.S. government. In January 2020, Emergent informed Soligenix of manufacturing issues, having provided doses of RiVax that were "out of specification", causing the study to be suspended even after two trial participants had received doses. In April 2020, the Department of Health and Human Services announced that it would not provide further funding for RiVax clinical trials, although the agency did not announce whether this was related to previous issues. In subsequent securities filings, Soligenix stated that it was pursuing $19 million in damages from Emergent in arbitration proceedings.

In 2017, the company purchased the ACAM2000 (smallpox vaccinia) Vaccine, the only FDA-approved (2007)vaccine for active immunization against smallpox for those at a medical high risk of contracting the disease, from Sanofi Pasteur. Two years later, the Office of the Assistant Secretary for Preparedness and Response, Department of Health and Human Services, has signed a contract with the company worth an estimated US$2.8 billion for the company to provide ACAM2000 over a ten-year period.

In 2018, Emergent acquired Adapt Pharma, the manufacturer of Narcan (naloxone), a widely used nasal spray opioid-overdose antidote, for $735 million. Adapt is headquartered in Dublin, Ireland, and operates from Radnor, PA.

Emergent purchased (also in 2018) the specialty vaccine manufacturer PaxVax, whose product line includes FDA-approved typhoid vaccine Vivotif and cholera vaccine Vaxchora, from its owner, Cerebus Capital Management, a private equity fund. Vaxchora is the only oral vaccine against cholera approved by the FDA in the US. The acquisition also includes rights to vaccines in development. One of these vaccines is being tested as a prophylactic against the acute-respiratory disease adenovirus. Another is focused on the chikungunya virus which is transmitted by mosquitoes. The transaction provides Emergent with a Swiss R&D facility.

== Leadership ==
Fuad El-Hibri (deceased, April 23, 2022), the founder of the company and former CEO, led the company since its founding as BioPort Inc. until his retirement on April 1, 2012. El-Hibri continued to serve as the executive chairman of Emergent BioSolutions' board of directors until shortly before his death in 2022.

Robert G. Kramer Sr. became the company's president and CEO April 1, 2019. Prior to that, he was the president and chief operating officer. In April 2021, the Washington Post reported that Kramer sold $10 million worth of company stock in January and early February 2021 under a November 13, 2020, SEC Rule 10b-5 trading plan, which allows company executives to comply with insider trading laws by setting up predetermined plans to sell company stock. The sale was executed prior to announcements in March about Johnson & Johnson vaccine doses being discarded as well as subsequent ending production of the AstraZeneca vaccine at the Baltimore plant, but the trading plan was set up after the company had experienced COVID-19 vaccine production issues earlier in 2020. On April 19, 2021, the United States House Select Oversight Subcommittee on the Coronavirus Crisis announced an investigation into Emergent BioSolutions, requesting documents and testimony from El-Hibri and Kramer regarding "federal contracts since 2015, all communication with Kadlec as well as information on audits and inspections of its facilities, drug pricing and executive compensation." Later in April, shareholders filed a class action lawsuit against the company, alleging that they were misled by company executives regarding the company's COVID-19 production capacity. Kramer's previous significant sale of company stock under a SEC Rule 10b-5 plan was in April 2016, and several other Emergent executives also sold stock at that time. The share price subsequently fell, and a lawsuit was filed by investors regarding misrepresentation of the size of the U.S. government's order for anthrax vaccine from the company. Emergent denied the allegations, but paid the investors a $6.5 million settlement.

Kramer and El-Hibri testified before the United States House Select Oversight Subcommittee on the Coronavirus Crisis on May 19, 2021. Kramer acknowledged unsanitary conditions, including mold and peeling paint, at the Baltimore plant. He further initially testified that contamination of the Johnson & Johnson doses "was identified through our quality control procedures and checks and balances." But under questioning, he acknowledged that a Johnson & Johnson lab in the Netherlands, not Emergent, had discovered the contaminated doses. Executive compensation documents made public by the House subcommittee show that the company's board praised El-Hibri, who cashed in stock shares and options worth more than $42 million in 2020.

In June 2023, Kramer announced his retirement, effective immediately and was replaced as CEO on an interim basis by Haywood Miller.

In January 2026, New York Attorney General Letitia James sued Kramer under New York's Martin Act, alleging that he engaged in insider trading related to Emergent's COVID-19 vaccine manufacturing problems. The lawsuit alleged that Kramer established a stock-trading plan after learning of contamination problems affecting production of the Oxford–AstraZeneca COVID-19 vaccine, and subsequently received more than $10.1 million from stock sales before the manufacturing problems became public. Kramer denied wrongdoing.

== BioThrax ==
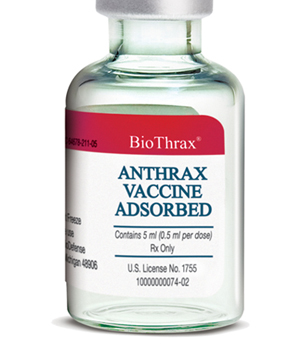
Anthrax Vaccine Adsorbed

Emergent BioSolutions is the manufacturer of the controversial BioThrax vaccine.

According to the U.S. National Library of Medicine, BioThrax was first made available in 1970. BioThrax (Anthrax Vaccine Adsorbed), a vaccine licensed by the U.S. Food and Drug Administration. Following a study by scientists from the Centers for Disease Control and Prevention, on December 19, 2008, Emergent received final FDA licensing for use of BioThrax five doses for intramuscular injection. Later in 2009, Emergent received approval from the FDA to extend the shelf life of its anthrax vaccine from three to four years.

BioThrax was approved for distribution in the United States in the US in 2015. BioThrax has received marketing approval in India, Singapore, and Germany. Health Canada, under the agency's Extraordinary Use New Drug Regulations, approved BioThrax for exclusive use against anthrax for an eight-year period. The Regulations provide a dual track for products allowing human usage while gathering clinical data on the effects of that usage. Additionally, the company has applied for approval of BioThrax in France, Poland, United Kingdom, Italy and the Netherlands.

The FDA gave BioThrax an "orphan drug" designation in April 2014. The FDA gives that status to drugs that are used to treat rare diseases. BioThrax is the only anthrax vaccine licensed by the FDA. Another company, VaxGen had received an $877.5 million contract to produce an alternative anthrax vaccine that was reported to "cause fewer side effects", require fewer injections, and have faster effectiveness. Following lobbying from Emergent BioSolutions, VaxGen's contract was cancelled in 2006 due to "poor performance", and development of their anthrax vaccine stopped.

As of April 2014, Emergent has sold over 66 million doses of BioThrax to the U.S. government. Three million U.S. military personnel have received the BioThrax vaccine.

The main buyer of BioThrax is the U.S. Centers for Disease Control and Prevention (CDC). The CDC buys BioThrax for the Strategic National Stockpile (SNS). The government uses the SNS to protect the public in the event of a national emergency like a terrorist attack. As of December 2016, Emergent has a $911 million contract with the CDC for BioThrax. The BioThrax vaccines will go to the SNS. The contract will supply around 29.4 million doses of the vaccine. Additionally, the Biomedical Advanced Research and Development Authority (BARDA) released a notice of intent to purchase around $100 million of BioThrax for the SNS in 2017.

Emergent submitted an application to the FDA for use of a large facility in Lansing, Michigan to produce BioThrax. On June 21, 2016, Emergent announced that it had moved a step forward in the process: the FDA completed the pre-approval phase of its inspection. A company facilities in Canton, Massachusetts was cited by the FDA in 2017 for failing to eliminate low levels of mold and yeast detected in the plant. The vaccine-vial filling Camden facility in Baltimore was cited for failure to conduct routine audits in 2018. In April, 2020, the FDA cited the Bayview facility in Baltimore for insufficient employee training, lack of electronic data security, and failure to investigate "data integrity concerns".

The New York Times reported in March 2021 that the US government had spent nearly a quarter of a billion dollars annually, nearly half of its budget to maintain the Strategic National Stockpile, to purchase BioThrax from Emergent during the preceding decade. In 2020, the government paid Emergent US$626 million. The report indicated that these purchases depleted funds needed to purchase vaccines and other supplies to respond to COVID-19 or other pandemics, despite prior warnings about the spending.

== Narcan ==
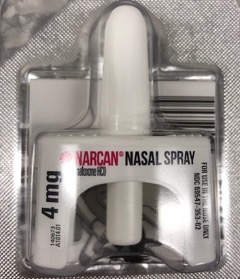
Narcan Nasal Dispenser

Narcan is mostly used as a "rescue drug" for individuals suffering from opioid overdose. Narcan, related to morphine, is an opioid antagonist that was originally synthesized and patented by Mozes J. Lewenstein and Jack Fishman in the US in 1961. The drug was patented in the UK by the Japanese company Sankyo (now Daiichi Sankyo). The US FDA approved the drug in treatment of opioid overdose in 1971.

In 2012, concerned about inconsistency of dosage, along with the need for a responder having some specialized training in making the naloxone injection in a tense, highly- charged emergency environment, Phil Skolnick, then director of the Division of Therapeutics & Medical Consequences at the National Institute on Drug Abuse and Roger Crystal, the chief executive officer of Lightlake Therapeutics (now Opiant Pharmaceuticals), teamed to develop an intranasal version of the drug. NIDA then generated a highly concentrated solution of naloxone which Lightlake was able to package in its nasal spray devices. After successful clinical trials, Lightlake entered into a partnership with Adapt Pharma to manufacture the product, Narcan. The FDA approved Narcan nasal spray in November, 2015. Emergent Biosolutions purchased Adapt Pharma in 2018.

== COVID-19 vaccines and production issues ==
=== Johnson & Johnson and Oxford–AstraZeneca vaccines ===
In 2020, the company signed a $135 million deal with Johnson & Johnson to provide and reserve manufacturing capacity for J&J's COVID-19 vaccine candidate for Severe acute respiratory syndrome coronavirus 2 (SARS-CoV-2), the virus which causes COVID-19. Human testing began later that year, and the vaccine received Emergency Use Authorization from the FDA in February 2021.

In June 2020, Cambridge UK-based pharmaceutical developer and manufacturer, AstraZeneca, initiated a $174 million agreement with the company to help develop and produce 300 million doses of the Oxford–AstraZeneca COVID-19 vaccine. AstraZeneca had also signed a previous agreement with Emergent for $87 million (US) naming Emergent a development partner for the vaccine, which was manufactured at the company's Bayview plant in East Baltimore, Maryland.

=== Production and contamination issues ===
Emergent's manufacturing facility in East Baltimore had previously received $163 million from the US government to make upgrades in order to increase production of vaccines and therapies, including the Johnson & Johnson and AstraZeneca COVID-19 vaccines. However, the plant experienced multiple production issues, and audits in 2020 from several institutions, including internal audits from Emergent, as well as external ones from AstraZeneca, Johnson & Johnson, and U.S. federal government agencies identified issues with deficiencies in employee training, cross-contamination, improper disinfection, and inadequate testing of raw materials. Due to issues with contamination or suspected contamination at the plant between October 2020 and January 2021, 2-3 million doses of AstraZeneca vaccine had to be thrown out, and improper manufacturing of cells in November 2020 caused a batch of Johnson & Johnson vaccine to be thrown out. Later, in March 2021, workers at the Baltimore plant conflated the ingredients of two COVID-19 vaccines, ruining about 15 million doses of Johnson & Johnson's vaccine, and causing them to be discarded. The mix-up, which federal officials attributed to human error, delayed future shipments of the vaccine. The New York Times reported on April 5, 2021, that: "Emergent BioSolutions has made about 150 million doses of Covid-19 vaccines at its Baltimore factory. But so far not a single dose has been usable."

As of April 2021, 62 million doses of the Johnson & Johnson vaccine produced at the plant were not discarded but have yet to be distributed, pending assessment for contamination. Consequently, in April 2021, the U.S. Department of Health and Human Services ordered that the plant cease manufacturing of the AstraZeneca vaccine, and that a leadership team from Johnson & Johnson be put in place to run production and manufacturing at the plant, although the workers there are still from Emergent. Amid these issues, the U.S. government announced an additional $23 million in funding for the plant for increased production of the Johnson & Johnson vaccine on April 5, 2021, but because the Astra-Zeneca vaccine was not under production, the Biden administration was no longer paying fees to Emergent tied to the production of that vaccine. Subsequently, on April 17, Emergent announced that the plant had shut down all vaccine production following a request and further investigation from the FDA; as of June 2021, the plant has not re-opened. By June, a combined 75 million vaccine doses were condemned, with approximately 90 million vaccine doses remaining in storage pending further FDA decisions. The FDA cleared a total of 25 million vaccine doses for domestic and international distribution, but with a warning to recipients that "regulators cannot guarantee that Emergent BioSolutions ... followed good manufacturing practices."

In July 2021 the US Food and Drug Administration (FDA) authorized the company's Baltimore plant to restart the manufacturing of J&J Janssen one-dose vaccines, based upon "current observations of the implemented corrective actions". When the plant returns to full capacity in the fall, it can produce up to 120 million doses per month. The company, working with J&J, will persevere in getting FDA approval for doses manufactured at the facility earlier. The US government is looking for doses for export to countries seeking COVID-19 immunization.

As of August 2021, the US Food and Drug Administration (FDA) authorized eight batches of Johnson & Johnson's COVID-19 vaccine produced at the Emergent BioSolutions Bayview facility.

In January 2026, Emergent reached a settlement with the New York Attorney General arising from its approval of a stock-trading plan for then-CEO Robert Kramer during the COVID-19 vaccine manufacturing problems. Under the settlement, Emergent agreed to pay $900,000 in penalties and strengthen its policies governing executive stock trading. The attorney general alleged that the company approved Kramer's trading plan while unresolved contamination problems threatened its ability to manufacture the AstraZeneca vaccine according to schedule.

=== International use ===
Starting in March 2021, millions of doses of the AstraZeneca vaccine produced at the Baltimore plant, which were in storage and awaiting approval for use in the U.S., were loaned to Canada and Mexico, where that vaccine had been approved for emergency use. At the time the vaccines were loaned, the U.S. government was reportedly unaware at the time of prior production issues at the plant prior to reporting from the New York Times. AstraZeneca stated that the vaccines distributed had met all "required safety tests and quality control measures"; Canadian and Mexican officials stated that they had reviewed quality and safety documentation provided by the company and that the vaccines were safe for use. In late April 2021, 300,000 doses of the Johnson & Johnson vaccine were sent to Canada. Health Canada delayed the distribution of the vaccine because a substance used in the J&J vaccines was produced at Emergent BioSolutions' Baltimore facility. It was announced in June that Canada would not distribute these doses. Similarly, millions of doses of the Johnson and Johnson vaccine produced at the Baltimore plant were distributed to countries in the European Union and South Africa, as well as manufactured vaccine components to South Africa: although doses from one batch were declared safe for administration in the EU, approximately 6-9 million doses were sequestered for further quality testing as of May 2021 due to concerns regarding contamination.

=== Novavax ===
The company also initially teamed with Novavax Inc., a bio-technology company also based in Gaithersburg, MD., in the development and manufacture of the Novavax COVID-19 vaccine. Emergent petitioned the federal government's Biomedical Advanced Research and Development Authority (BARDA) to be chosen for the project, and was selected to produce the vaccine in one of its Maryland facilities. However, following production issues with the Johnson & Johnson and Oxford–AstraZeneca vaccines at its Baltimore plant and to decrease the burden on the plant, Novavax subsequently partnered with a different manufacturer in a new agreement overseen by the U.S. government.

== R&D, manufacturing and other products ==
=== Chikungunya vaccine development ===
The company has been developing a vaccine to counter chikungunya, a mosquito-borne virus that was mostly found, until the past decade, only in central and East Africa. Then it began growing. E.g., in 2011, there were zero cases reported in Latin America; in 2014 the region suffered from one million cases. Between 2010 and 2019 the virus is estimated to have been responsible for 106,000 average annual disability-adjusted life years (DALY). In 2018 the FDA conferred its "Fast Track" designation on the company's investigational chikungunya virus virus-like particle (CHIKV VLP) vaccine candidate. The following year, 2019, the European Medicines Agency awarded its PRIME (Priority Medicines) designation to CHIKV VLP as well. Companies who receive the PRIME nod can get magnified interchanges and timely interaction with EMA to accelerate development and approval. The CHIKV VLP vaccine candidate is licensed by the National Institute of Allergy and Infectious Diseases at the National Institutes of Health. In May 2021, the company reported that its single-dose vaccine demonstrated strong efficacy two years after injection, with an increase in immune response when measured by serum neutralizing antibodies (SNA).

=== RSDL ===
One of Emergent's medical countermeasure products is Reactive Skin Decontamination Lotion (RSDL), a lotion that clears and neutralizes chemical warfare agents. The product, used internationally, was tested in a study conducted by the US Army Medical Research Institute of Chemical Defense, where RSDL was found to provide superior protection against soman when decontamination was commenced within three minutes of exposure. RSDL is made of the chemicals Dekon 139 2,3 butanedione monoxime (DAM). According to the Chemical Hazards Emergency Medical Management office within the United States Department of Health and Human Services, "RSDL is used as a medical device for the decontamination of skin exposed to chemical warfare agents such as sulfur mustard, VX, VR and certain biological toxins." As of September 2017, RSDL is available to the regular public. Previously, it was only available to the military.

The United States Department of Defense in September 2017 awarded the company a contract to supply the RSDL kit (RSDL) to the military. The contract is for five years and is worth $171 million. The RSDL lotion protects people's skin from various chemical warfare agents. The product contains a sponge that is filled with the decontamination lotion in and impermeable packet. When applied to the skin, the lotion reacts with the agent on the skin and quickly neutralizes it so that it becomes non-toxic.

=== Auto-injector diazepam ===
The Medical CBRN (Chemical, Biological, Radiological and Nuclear) Defense Consortium, a DOD initiative within its Joint Program Executive Office for Chemical and Biological Defense has awarded the company US$20 million to develop an auto-injector to administer diazepam. The injection is designed to reverse certain effects of nerve agents in military or chemical terrorism situations, specifically convulsions. The investment supports R&D, manufacturing and negotiating the approval process with the US FDA.

=== Mt. Sinai Health System collaboration during the COVID-19 pandemic ===
The company joined forces with New York City's Mount Sinai Health System and ImmunoTek Bio Centers (New Orleans LA) to research, develop, conduct clinical trials, and manufacture COVID-HIG, hyperimmune globulin, also known as polyclonal antibodies, a concentrated antibody made from plasma acquired from individuals infected with and recovered from COVID-19. The research is designed to determine whether COVID-HIG could protect people at higher risk of exposure and infection (like health care and military personnel) and therefore limit the spread of the infection. The initial study is funded by a $34.6 million (US) grant from the US Dept. of Defense and the Joint Program Executive Office for Chemical, Biological, Radiological, and Nuclear Defense (JPEO-CBRND).

== Public affairs ==
=== Opioid overdose crisis ===
In October 2018, the company donated two doses of Narcan nasal spray to all 16,568 libraries in the US. Emergent had previously donated 20,000 doses to 4,700 universities in the US in 2017. It later expanded this donation to all US high schools as well. Additionally, the company donated free Narcan kits to 2,700 YMCAs across the US. Narcan and naloxone are offered at major drug retailers like Walgreens and CVS in many states without a prescription.

The obstacles created by the worldwide COVID-19 pandemic resulted in over 90,000 opioid overdose fatalities in 2020, reflecting the global crisis' effect on attempts to stop the increase of the synthetic opioid fentanyl in the illegal narcotics supply, according to the US Centers for Disease Control (CDC). With the focus of healthcare resources extended to quell the coronavirus emergency, more substance abuse users found it difficult to obtain treatment and medication. They were also more isolated, restricting outreach to first responders and access to naloxone (Narcan). The US government has made resisting the opioid crisis an "urgent priority". In July 2021, Emergent Biosolutions teamed with a group of individuals and organizations by sponsoring a program to focus attention on the current opioid overdose emergency. The campaign, called Reverse the Silence, provides an unbranded website and national television and radio commercials focused on diminishing the ignominy of opioid addiction and overdose. Program participants include former Congresswoman Mary Bono, NFL star Darren Waller and four addiction advocacy groups. The campaign urges substance use abusers, their families, friends and others to "speak up" for people living with addiction. The campaign's website is not tied to Narcan specifically but offers a plethora of naloxone resources and information on how the drug works and where to obtain it. The site mentions that every state allows individuals to obtain naloxone without a prescription.

=== Government relations ===
Emergent Biosolutions was among many companies giving financial support to delegations at both major party political conventions in the summer of 2016, a practice that "watchdog groups have raised concerns about ... as corporate donors — skittish about Republican nominee Donald J. Trump — have sought new and less overt ways to give money and gain influence".

Emergent Biosolutions PAC donated tens of thousands of dollars in 2020 to both Republicans and Democrats from Joe Biden and Dick Durbin to Andy Harris and Mitch McConnell. The majority of contributions were directed to Democrats (37.6%), but the amount donated favored Republicans (62.4%).

== See also ==
- Anthrax attacks of 2001
- Anthrax toxin
- Anthrax Vaccine Immunization Program
- Biotechnology
- List of pharmaceutical companies
- List of vaccine topics
- Naloxone
- Pharmaceutical industry
