= Fuad El-Hibri =

German-American businessman and philanthropist (1958–2022)

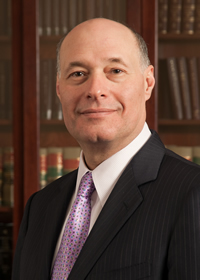
- Official photo portrait of Fuad El-Hibri
- Born: March 2, 1958; Hildesheim, Lower Saxony, West Germany
- Died: April 23, 2022 (aged 64); Potomac, Maryland, U.S.
- Citizenship: United States
- Education: Stanford University; Yale University
- Known for: Founder of Emergent BioSolutions
- Board member of: U.S. Chamber of Commerce; Yale Healthcare Conference; Hibri Charitable Foundation; International Biomedical Research Alliance; National Health Museum; Heifetz International Music Institute

Fuad El-Hibri (March 2, 1958 – April 23, 2022) was a German-American businessman and philanthropist, and founder of Emergent BioSolutions.

== Biography ==
=== Early life ===
Fuad El-Hibri was born in Hildesheim, Germany. He spent his childhood equally in Europe and the Middle East before coming to the United States to get an economics degree from Stanford and an MBA from Yale.

=== Early career ===
El-Hibri worked most of his career in the telecommunications industry. Between graduate school and working for BioPort and Emergent, he worked abroad, in countries including Indonesia, Saudi Arabia, Russia, Venezuela and El Salvador.

El-Hibri served as president of Digicel from August 2000 to February 2005. He served as the president of East West Resources Corporation from September 1990 to January 2004.

He was a member of the senior management team of Speywood, LTD. in the United Kingdom and organized and directed the management buyout of Porton Products Ltd. El-Hibri reorganized Porton, and was advisor to the senior management team involved in the oversight of operations and served as a senior associate and resident project manager at Booz Allen Hamilton and as a manager of Citicorp in New York City (Mergers and Acquisitions), and in Jeddah, Saudi Arabia (Operations and Credit).

El-Hibri has been chairman of East West Resources Corporation, a venture capital and financial consulting firm, since June 1990. He served as the chairman of Digicel Holdings from August 2000 to October 2006. He served as executive chairman of the board of Emergent BioDefense Operations Lansing Inc.

=== Emergent BioSolutions and BioPort ===
El-Hibri was the Emergent BioSolutions board of directors executive chairman from April 2012 until shortly before his death. He was both the board chairman and the CEO of the company from 2004 to 2012. He was the board chairman and CEO of BioPort Corporation from 1998 to 2004. Emergent acquired BioPort in 2004.

His main role as the chairman of Emergent was to develop corporate strategy and mergers and acquisitions.

After the 2001 anthrax attacks, some conspiracy theorists posted Internet websites that tried to imply that El-Hibri was connected to Osama Bin Laden and was connected to the anthrax attacks. USA Today interviewed El-Hibri in 2004 for an article about Muslim CEOs of companies helping to fight terrorism, and wrote, "El-Hibri calls the Web sites annoying and jokes that he's lucky to be in the vaccination business so that he can inoculate himself from the pain of accusers who can't be confronted."

== Charitable Activity ==
=== Fuad El-Hibri '82 Entrepreneurial Award ===
One of the Yale University School of Management donor-funded awards, the El-Hibri Award provides first year SOM students with internship program funding over the summer, seed capital for new businesses for second-year men and women and special funding for those going into early-stage start-up ventures. A group of 14 Yale alumni - entrepreneurs, innovators, and investors - choose the students who receive the awards, which total $100,000.

== Boards and leadership activities ==
El-Hibri served on the boards of the U.S. Chamber of Commerce, International Biomedical Research Alliance, and National Health Museum. He also served on the advisory boards of the Heifetz International Music Institute and Yale Healthcare Conference.

== Personal life ==
El-Hibri's mother was German, and his father was a Lebanese businessman of maternal Syrian descent. As a child, he lived in Germany and Lebanon. He became a U.S. citizen in 1999. He died on April 23, 2022, at Potomac, Maryland from pancreatic cancer.
