= Public health emergency =

Public health emergency can refer to:

- Public Health Emergency of International Concern, a declaration issued by the World Health Organization in cases of international public health emergencies
- Public health emergency (United States), a declaration by health authorities in the United States in cases of national public health emergencies
  - PublicHealthEmergency.gov, a web service of the U.S. government on matters of national public health emergencies

== See also ==
- Public Health Emergency Preparedness
