= Emergency Care Coordination Center =

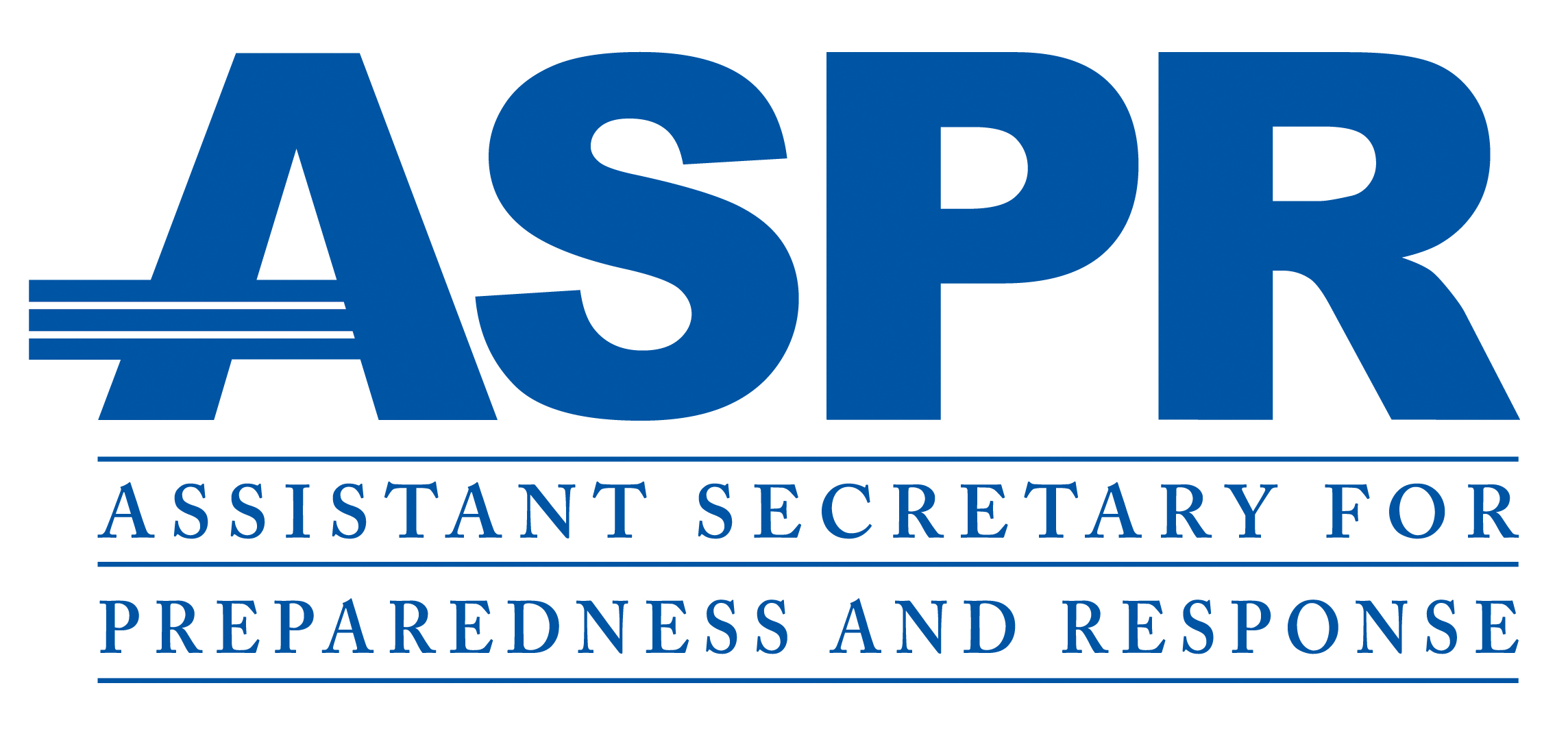
- ASPR Logo

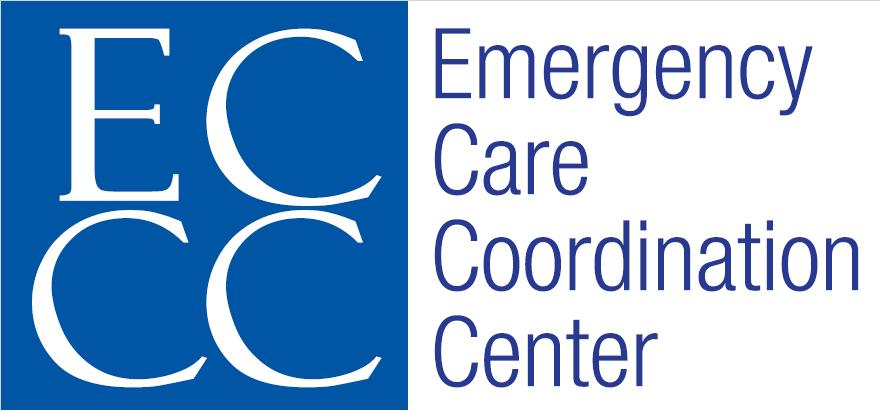
- ECCC Logo

Agency overview
- Formed: January 2009
- Jurisdiction: United States of America
- Annual budget: $2.6 billion USD 2021
- Parent department: U.S. Department of Health and Human Services
- Website: ASPR

The Emergency Care Coordination Center (ECCC) is the policy home for the emergency care community within the federal government. It is charged with strengthening the U.S. response systems to better prepare for times of crisis. It was established in January 2009.

The ECCC is within the Office of the Assistant Secretary for Preparedness and Response agency (ASPR), which is, in turn, overseen by the U.S. Department of Health and Human Services. Its charter was published in the Federal Register on Wednesday, April 29, 2009. Its requested budget for 2021 was $2.6 billion.

== Mission ==
To lead the United States Government’s efforts to create an emergency care system that is patient- and community-centered, integrated into the broader healthcare system, high quality, and prepared to respond in times of public health emergencies.

== Organization ==
The ECCC supports the ASPR mission by focusing federal efforts on improvements to the delivery of daily emergency care that are the foundation of response to disasters and public health emergencies. The ECCC is an essential part of Office of Policy and Planning (OPP), and the Division of Health System Policy (DHSP).

== Partners ==
The ECCC works in close coordination with the Federal Interagency Committee for Emergency Medical Services (FICEMS) and its supporting agency, the National Highway Traffic Safety Administration’s Office of Emergency Medical Services (EMS). While FICEMS specifically focuses on issues relating to pre-hospital care, the ECCC and FICEMS work together to coordinate and align the efforts of the Federal Government throughout the entire spectrum of the emergency care system.

== Background ==
In 2006, the Institute of Medicine’s (IOM) Committee on the Future of Emergency Care in the United States Health System released its findings on the state of the U.S. Emergency Care System in three volumes. The reports, titled Hospital-Based Emergency Care: At the Breaking Point; Emergency Medical Services: At the Crossroads; and Emergency Care for Children: Growing Pains describe a system that is “overburdened,” “underfunded,” “highly fragmented,” and “increasingly unable to appropriately respond to the demands placed upon it each and every day.” Recognizing the precarious state of the emergency care in the U.S., the IOM recommended the development of “regionalized, coordinated, and accountable emergency care systems throughout the country.” The report also recommended that Congress “establish a lead agency for emergency and trauma care…housed in the Department of Health & Human Services (DHHS).” Following the IOM report in 2007, Homeland Security Presidential Directive #21 mandated the creation of an office within DHHS that would “address the full spectrum of issues that have an impact on care in hospital emergency departments, including the entire continuum of patient care from pre-hospital to disposition from emergency or trauma care.”

== Directors ==
On December 4, 2013, Brendan G. Carr, MD, MA, MS was announced director of the ECCC, under Nicole Lurie at the ASPR, and remained under Robert Kadlec. Dr. Carr is residency trained and board certified in emergency medicine, and completed fellowships in trauma and surgical critical care, as well as in health policy research at the University of Pennsylvania as a part of the Robert Wood Johnson Foundation’s Clinical Scholar program. Dr. Carr’s research focuses on the association between emergency care system design and outcomes for unplanned critical illness including trauma, stroke, and cardiac arrest. He remains clinically active, caring for patients in the Emergency Department. As of 2021, Nikki Bratcher-Bowman is the Acting Assistant Secretary.
