= Gerald Parker (US government official) =

American government official

Special Assistant to the President and Senior Director for Biosecurity and Pandemic Response
- In office January 20, 2025 – July 30, 2025
- President: Donald Trump
- Preceded by: Paul Friedrichs

Deputy Assistant Secretary of Defense for Chemical and Biological Defense
- In office 2010–2013
- President: Barack Obama

Principal Deputy Assistant Secretary for Preparedness and Response
- In office 2005–2010
- President: George W. Bush; Barack Obama

Personal details
- Education: Texas A&M University (BS); Baylor College of Medicine (PhD); Texas A&M University (DVM)

Gerald W. Parker is an American government official who served as the head of the White House Office of Pandemic Preparedness and Response Policy.

== Early life and education ==
Parker graduated from Texas A&M’s College of Veterinary Medicine, Baylor College of Medicine Graduate School of Biomedical Sciences, and the Industrial College of the Armed Forces.

== Career and awards ==
Parker served 26 years in active duty military service, including leadership roles at the United States Army Medical Research and Materiel Command and the United States Army Medical Research Institute of Infectious Diseases.

Dr. Parker held senior executive-level positions at the Department of Homeland Security, the Department of Health and Human Services (HHS), and the Department of Defense (DOD), including serving as the Principal Deputy Assistant Secretary for Preparedness and Response at the Department of Health and Human Services, and Deputy Assistant Secretary of Defense for Nuclear, Chemical, and Biological Defense Programs at the Department of Defense.

Parker served as a senior advisor for the Assistant Secretary for Preparedness and Response at the Department of Health and Human Services from August 2020 to February 2021, during the height of the COVID-19 pandemic.

In 2022, Parker testified before the Senate Committee on Homeland Security and Government Affairs about U.S. biosecurity preparedness.

In February 2025, Parker was tapped to lead the White House Office of Pandemic Preparedness and Response Policy. In June 2025, Parker resigned from this position.

Parker is a 2009 recipient of the Distinguished Executive Presidential Rank Award, the Secretary of Defense Medal for Meritorious Civilian Service in 2013, and the Senator Melcher Leadership in Public Policy Award from the Association of American Veterinary Medical Colleges in 2019.
