= W. Craig Vanderwagen =

American health official

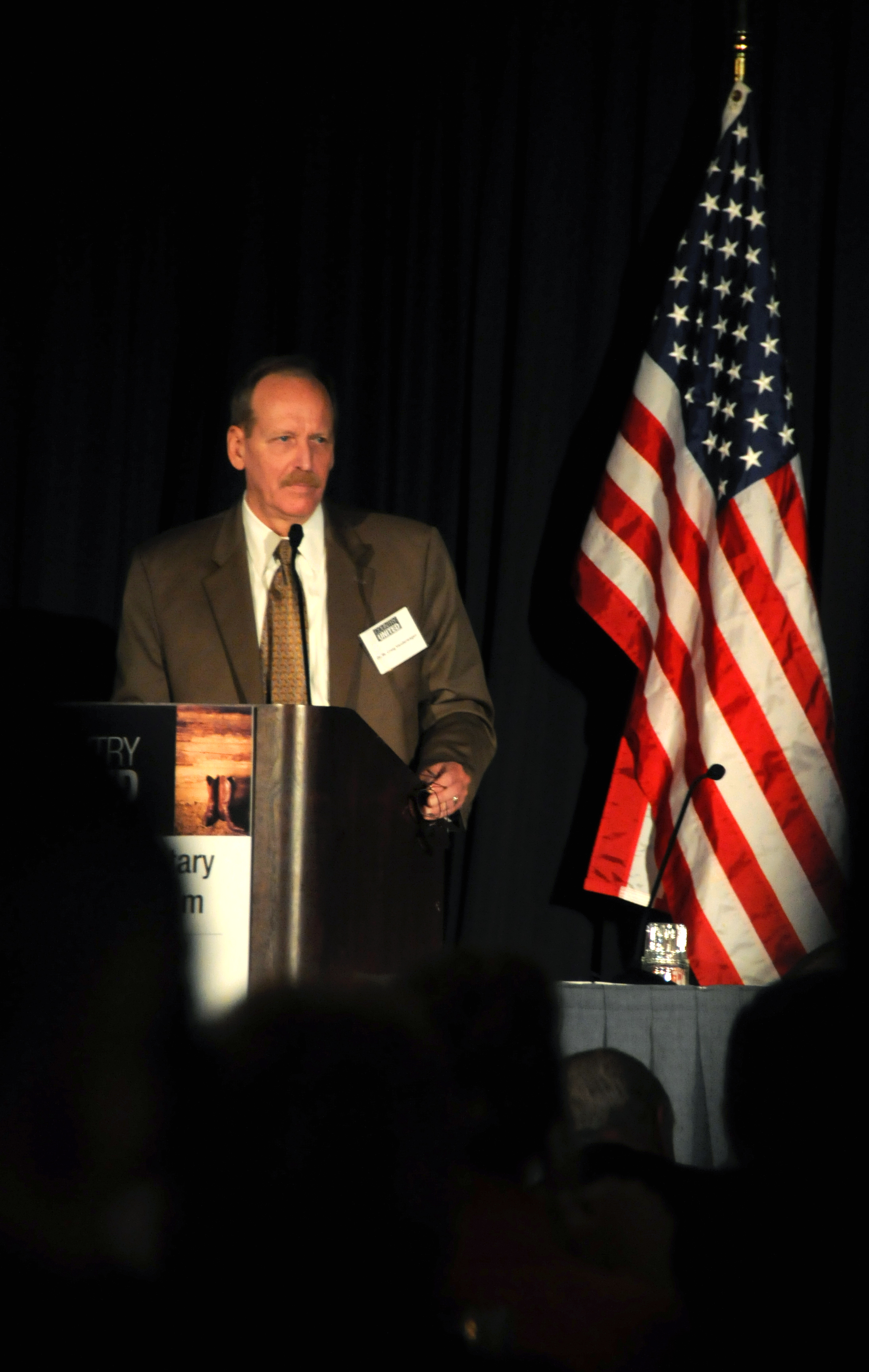
- Military career
- Allegiance: United States of America; U.S. Department of Health and Human Services
- Branch: U.S. Public Health Service Commissioned Corps
- Rank: Rear Admiral (upper half)
- Commands: Assistant Secretary for Preparedness and Response

W. Craig Vanderwagen is a retired rear admiral who served in the United States Public Health Service.

== History ==
Vanderwagen served 28 years as a uniformed officer in the U.S. Public Health Service, retiring with the rank of rear admiral (upper half). His last assignment, in 2006, was as the presidentially appointed Assistant Secretary for Preparedness and Response (ASPR) at the U.S. Department of Health and Human Services. As the founding Assistant Secretary of this office, he implemented new federal legislation that established the office of the ASPR as the principal leader for all federal public health and medical response activities to deliberate or natural disasters in the U.S. The legislation established a federal role in the development and utilization of human and other material assets in preparedness and response, and systems for deploying and managing these assets in emergency situations. This legislation directed the ASPR office to establish and oversee a federal capacity to develop and support medical countermeasures with a budgetary responsibility of approximately $11.6 billion. Vanderwagen expanded the ASPR office from a few hundred to over 10,000 employees.

Vanderwagen was responsible for the creation of operational plans to address 15 national threats including biological threats such as anthrax, smallpox, and plague, as well as threats from nuclear radiation, and chemical devices, and natural disasters such as hurricanes and earthquakes. Vanderwagen also implemented the Biodefense Acquisition and Research Development Authority (BARDA) under the new legislation.

Prior to ASPR, Vanderwagen served 25 years in the Indian Health Service (IHS), the U.S. federally funded program of public health and clinical health care services provided to 2.5 million members of federally recognized American Indian and Alaska Native nations, tribes, and bands.

Vanderwagen has served on a variety of international efforts and activities. He was the senior United States Government representative to the Global Health Security Action Group (composed of the G-7, Mexico, WHO, and the EC) from 2006 to 2009, and contributed to the establishment of a collaborative Medical Countermeasure Development Enterprise initiative of this group. In addition, Vanderwagen has served as the senior U.S. Government representative on the international Arctic Research Committee (1990–94) and was a consultant to the World Health Organization on Indigenous Health Issues (1997–2001). He was the U.S. co-chair for Healing Our Spirit Worldwide (2002–2003), an indigenous health effort to address behavioral and social diseases affecting indigenous communities. He has also served as the chief medical officer of the U.S. Public Health Service and U.S. deputy surgeon general (2000–2005).

Vanderwagen has had leadership roles in a number of domestic and international disaster- and war-related events. He served with the Pan American Health Organization in response to Hurricane Mitch in Honduras in 1999. He was the medical commander during Operation Provide Refuge, a USG support activity supporting refugees during the Serbian-Kosovar conflict in 1999. He provided consultative services in support of the civilian health system in Afghanistan in 2002–2003. He was the CPA director of public health and primary care in support of the Iraq Ministry of Health deployed to Iraq in 2003–2004 revitalizing the civilian health system in Iraq. He was the PHS team leader aboard the USNS Mercy in the U.S. Government’s response to the tsunami in Indonesia in 2005 and was the overall commander for public health and medical response to Hurricane Katrina in 2005.

Since his retirement from government service, Vanderwagen has had positions with a number of private companies: senior partner with Martin, Blanck & Associates; chairman at VIDO Intervac, a Canadian vaccine research and development organization; general manager of East West Protection; and board chairman at ENG Mobile Systems.
