= White House Office of Pandemic Preparedness and Response Policy =

The White House Office of Pandemic Preparedness and Response Policy (OPPR) is an official office within the Executive Office of the President.

In 2022, Congress passed the PREVENT Pandemics Act, formally establishing the Office of Pandemic Preparedness and Response Policy to better prepare the United States for future pandemics and adding additional resources to the existing directorate. The Biden Administration announced the creation of the OPPR in July 2023. It began work in August 2023.

In 2025, Gerald Parker resigned as head of the office, leaving the office with no employees.

== Leadership ==
- Maj. Gen. Paul Friedrichs (2023-2025)
- Gerald Parker (Feb 2025-Jun 2025)
