= PHE =

PHE or Phe may refer to:

== Science and technology ==
- Protocol header encrypt or BitTorrent protocol encryption
- Phenylalanine (symbol: Phe), an amino acid
- Phoenix (constellation) (IAU abbreviation: Phe)
- Potentially habitable exoplanet

== Organisations ==
- Paramount Home Entertainment, the home video distribution arm of Paramount Pictures
- Public Health England, an executive agency of the Department of Health in the UK
- Physical and Health Education Canada (PHE Canada), a Canadian health organization; See Canada Fitness Award Program

== Other uses ==
- Population, health, and the environment, an approach to development that integrates health or family planning with conservation efforts
- Port Hedland International Airport (IATA code), Australia
- Public health emergency
