= Stewart Simonson =

American lawyer

- Education: University of Wisconsin–Madison (BA, JD)
- Occupation: Senior Advisor at Global Health Strategies

Stewart Simonson is a Senior Advisor at Global Health Strategies, and a Senior Adviser (Non-resident) at the Center for Strategic and International Studies. He previously served as the Assistant Director-General of the World Health Organization responsible for the WHO Office at the United Nations and the WHO-US Liaison Office. Simonson joined WHO in 2017 as the Assistant Director-General for the General Management Group at WHO headquarters in Geneva, Switzerland.

Prior to joining WHO in October 2017, Simonson was a technical advisor/administrator at Hôpital Sacré-Coeur (HSC) in Milot, Haiti. He also served as legal counsel and corporate secretary for The CRUDEM Foundation, Inc., HSC’s U.S. sponsor. HSC is a 225-bed definitive care hospital located in northern Haiti.

Simonson was the first Assistant Secretary for Public Health Emergency Preparedness at the U.S. Department of Health and Human Services (HHS). He assumed office in 2004. Simonson told the president in his 2006 resignation letter that he had accomplished what he had set out to do, and it was time to pursue other opportunities. Simonson joined HHS in August 2001 and was instrumental in building the HHS preparedness and response organization that grew out of the September 11th attacks.

Simonson served as the Secretary's principal advisor on matters related to bioterrorism and other public health emergencies. He also coordinated interagency activities between HHS, other federal departments, agencies, offices and state and local officials responsible for emergency preparedness and the protection of the civilian population. Simonson was an early advocate of pandemic preparedness and led the Bush administration's work to respond to H5N1 influenza, including building influenza surveillance capacity around the world and securing the egg supply required for influenza vaccine production.

Simonson serves on the Board of Directors of the Mérieux Foundation USA and the Board of Trustees of the CMB Foundation. He is also a Senior Consultant to the Center for Global Health Science & Security at Georgetown University. Simonson is a member of the Council on Foreign Relations and the Cosmos Club. He lives in Washington, DC and New York, NY.

== History ==
Simonson is a graduate of the University of Wisconsin–Madison where he received a Bachelor of Arts degree in 1986 and Juris Doctor degree in 1994. He is a member of the bar in Wisconsin and the District of Columbia.

After completing undergraduate studies, Simonson worked for several years on Wall Street before returning to Wisconsin to attend law school. Simonson worked his way through law school at the Wisconsin Department of Corrections. Upon graduation he was hired as Deputy Legal Counsel to Wisconsin Governor Tommy Thompson and was soon promoted to Legal Counsel, a post he held from 1995 to 1999. Under Thompson, Simonson chaired the Governor's Pardon Advisory Board, supervised, on behalf of the Governor, Wisconsin's emergency management agencies, led policy development for crime and corrections, and coordinated the state's public safety agencies.

When Thompson became chairman of the board at the National Railroad Passenger Corporation (Amtrak) in the late 1990s, the Board of Directors appointed Simonson as corporate secretary and counsel for the company. Then, when Thompson was appointed to be Health and Human Services (HHS) secretary, he brought Simonson with him to that agency as well. From 2001 to 2003 he was the HHS Deputy General Counsel and provided legal advice and counsel to the Secretary on public health preparedness matters.

Simonson also served as Special Counsel to the Secretary and acted as the Secretary's liaison to the Homeland Security Council and the Department of Homeland Security. He also supervised policy development for countermeasure research and development programs, including Project Bioshield, a program to speed the manufacture of vaccines and antidotes. Since its enactment in July 2004, Project BioShield has launched nine acquisition programs including medical countermeasure acquisition programs for all four threat agents (anthrax, smallpox, botulinum toxins, and radiological/nuclear threats) determined by the Secretary of the Department of Homeland Security to pose material threats to the national security of the United States. Of the $3.4 billion available to the program between FY04 and FY08, over $1.7 billion had been obligated and the Strategic National Stockpile has substantially increased its holding of anthrax vaccines and medical countermeasures for radiological/nuclear threats.

Simonson was awarded the Surgeon General's Medallion in May 2006 for "Significant Collaboration with and Contributions to the USPHS Commissioned Corps Response Mission." In June 2006, Simonson received the Public Health Achievement Award from the FDA Center for Biologics Evaluation and Research: "For Tireless and exceptional dedication in better preparing our nation and world against the threats of bioterrorism and emerging infectious diseases, including pandemic influenza."

On May 10, 2006 the Director-General of WHO Dr. J.W. Lee wrote: "I want to add my personal congratulations for the contributions you have made to international public health since your appointment as Assistant Secretary for Public Health Emergency Preparedness. I will be sorry to see you leave. Your personal interest in pandemic influenza has added much to our joint global preparedness and response and response activities. And without your input and actions, the new and critical International Health Regulations likely would be less robust and action-oriented. Action rather than mere words has been the hallmark of your tenure in the Department of Health and Human Services."

Following the release of a report critical of the US National Institutes of Health (NIH) Clinical Center, Simonson was asked by Dr. Francis Collins, Director of NIH, to lead an initiative to engage Clinical Center staff and make recommendations to improve the Clinical Center. Informed by 70 focus group sessions with Clinical Center staff, Simonson submitted his report including these recommendations to Dr. Collins and the Clinical Center Research Hospital Board on July 14, 2017.

== Controversies ==
Simonson's alleged lack of qualifications and of public health experience were a target for Democrats attacking President Bush's perceived cronyism, especially in light of the poor job Bush-appointee Michael D. Brown is believed to have done responding to Hurricane Katrina. Unlike Mr. Brown, Mr. Simonson, 42 years old at the time, kept his job, and remained at HHS under Mr. Thompson's successor, Mike Leavitt. Some respected public health officials rose to his defense, describing Mr. Simonson as a person who worked behind the scenes to get funding and political support for long-neglected public-health initiatives.

Simonson coordinated the HHS response to Hurricane Katrina and received high marks. Dr. Louis Cataldie, the Louisiana State Medical Examiner, wrote in his book, Coroners Journal: "I respect Stewart Simonson, Assistant Secretary for Public Health Emergency Preparedness at the Department of Health and Human Services, who met me face-to-face and stayed true to his word. Imagine someone from D.C. being a straight guy. He has delivered every time - not so with some of these other cover-your-ass feds." (Cataldie, Louis, Coroner's Journal, G. Putnam's Sons, New York, NY (2006) Page 7.)

Some of the nation's leading scientists were quick to defend Simonson. Dr. Michael T. Osterholm, an infectious disease expert at the University of Minnesota said: "Of all the people I've worked with over my career, no one is more competent".

"Here's the guy who has really done a terrific job under very complicated, adverse circumstances. To have him be the target the way he has, has got to be one of the really unfair events in Washington, which is a pretty unfair place to begin with," said Anthony Fauci, head of the National Institute of Allergy and Infectious Diseases, an HHS unit (Wall Street Journal, December 12, 2005).

D. A. Henderson, a public health expert who led the effort to wipe out smallpox in the late 1960s and 1970s, said: "The general feeling was this is someone who may be here because of political reasons, but this is a dedicated person who has the interests of the country at heart." Dr. Henderson, who joined HHS after September 11, 2001, and left in 2002, says Mr. Simonson was instrumental in helping him do everything from finding office space to working on an early HHS purchase of smallpox vaccine (Wall Street Journal, December 12, 2005). In his recent book, Dr. Henderson described Simonson's role in launching the post-9/11 public health preparedness program at the U.S. Department of Health and Human Services: "Another important figure was Stewart Simonson, special counsel and long-time confidante of the secretary. He was comparatively young and new to government but a quick learner and determined to allow neither bureaucracy nor red tape to stand in the way of getting the job done. Little would have been achieved without both of them" (referring to Simonson and Dr. William Raub) D. A. Henderson, MD, Smallpox: The Death of a Disease, Prometheus Books (2009), Page 191.

== Publications ==
Ziemer, Tim and Simonson, Stewart. “These Diseases Could Be Consigned to the Dustbin of History.” The Washington Post (2026).

Weeks, Kirsten and Simonson, Stewart. “Faith, Mothers, and the Fight Against Neglected Tropical Diseases: A Call to Restore U.S. Leadership.” Christian Journal for Global Health (2025).

Simonson, Stewart. "Reflections on Preparedness: Pandemic Planning in the Bush Administration." Saint Louis University Journal of Health Law & Policy 4.1 (2010): 5-31.

Nightingale, Stuart L., Prasher, Joanna M., Simonson, Stewart. "Emergency Use Authorization (EUA) to Enable Use of Needed Products in Civilian and Military Emergencies, United States." Journal of Emerging Infectious Diseases 13.7 (2007): 1046–1051.

Simonson, Stewart. "Advising on Publication" (Letter to Editor). Science 311.5759 (2006): 336–337.

== See also ==
- List of U.S. executive branch 'czars'
