= Public health emergency (United States) =

In the United States, a public health emergency declaration releases resources meant to handle an actual or potential public health crisis. Recent examples include:

- Incidents of flooding
- Severe weather
- the 2009 swine flu pandemic, which Homeland Security Secretary Janet Napolitano described as a "declaration of emergency preparedness."
- the COVID-19 pandemic
- the 2022 mpox outbreak

The National Disaster Medical System Federal Partners Memorandum of Agreement defines a public health emergency as "an emergency need for health care [medical] services to respond to a disaster, significant outbreak of an infectious disease, bioterrorist attack or other significant or catastrophic event." In order to activate the National Disaster Medical System (NDMS), "a public health emergency may include but is not limited to, public health emergencies declared by the Secretary of HHS [Health and Human Services] under 42 U.S.C. 247d, or a declaration of a major disaster or emergency under the Robert T. Stafford Disaster Relief and Emergency Assistance Act (Stafford Act), 42 U.S.C. 5121-5206)."

Floodwaters are harmful to the health of humans. This includes wastes like humans, livestock, hazardous waste, etc. The waste in the water can have germs and contaminants that can lead to illness. Also, causes physical injuries from debris, wild or stray animals. Declaration of public health emergency in the March 2009 flood of the Red River in North Dakota was made under section 319 of the Public Health Service Act. Under section 1135 of the Social Security Act, this declaration permits the state government to request waivers of certain Medicare, Medicaid, and CHIP requirements from the Centers for Medicare and Medicaid Services (CMS) Regional Office. Examples include allowing Medicare health plan beneficiaries to go out of network, allowing critical access hospitals to take more than the statutorily mandated limit of 25 patients, and not counting the expected longer lengths of stay for evacuated patients against the 96-hour average.

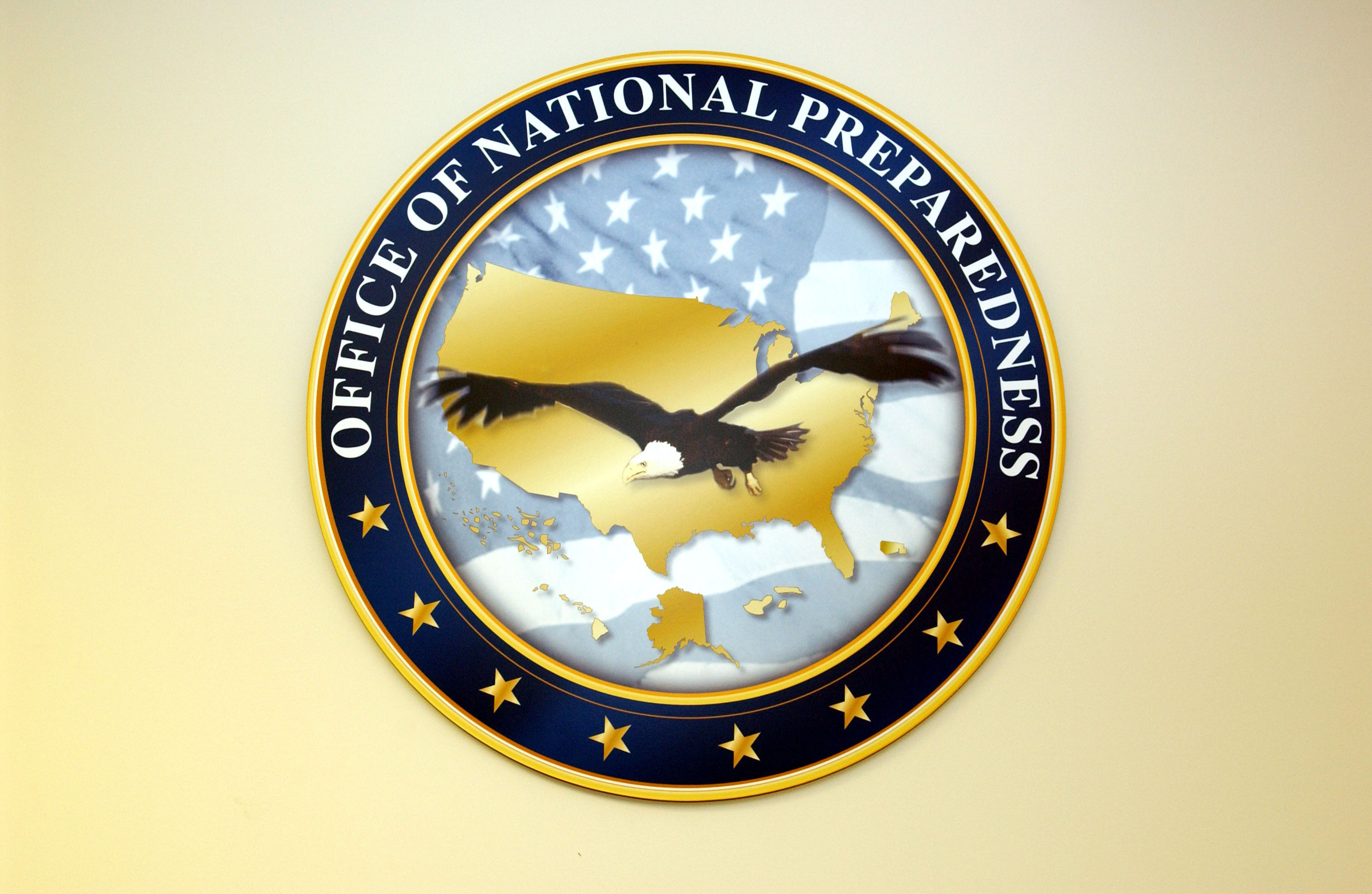
Federal Emergency Management Agency logo

In the swine flu outbreak, the declaration allowed the distribution of a federal stockpile of 12 million doses of Tamiflu to places where states could quickly get their share if they decided they needed it, with priority going to the five states with known cases. Because Obama's choice for Secretary of HHS, Kathleen Sebelius, had not yet been confirmed, the public announcement of the emergency was made by President Obama and Homeland Security Secretary Napolitano. However, Charles Johnson, acting HHS secretary, made the formal determination of a public health emergency under section 319 of the Public Health Service Act, 42 U.S.C. § 247d.

The NDMS defines a military health emergency as "an emergency need for hospital services to support the armed forces for casualty care arising from a major military operation, disaster, significant outbreak of an infectious disease, bioterrorist attack, or other significant or catastrophic event."

== See also ==
- Public Health Emergency.gov
- Public Health Information Network
- Public Health Emergency Preparedness
- United States Public Health Service § Emergency response since 1999
- Surgeon General of the United States
- Public health laboratory
- United States Public Health Service
- United States Public Health Service Commissioned Corps
- Disaster Medical Assistance Team
- Medical Reserve Corps
- Office of the Assistant Secretary for Preparedness and Response
- United States Deputy Secretary of Health and Human Services
- Public Readiness and Emergency Preparedness Act
- Model State Emergency Health Powers Act
- Federal Emergency Management Agency
- Department of Health and Human Services
- Emergency Management Institute
