= PublicHealthEmergency.gov =

PublicHealthEmergency.gov is a web portal created by the U.S. Department of Health and Human Services to serve as a single point of entry for access to public health risk, and situational awareness information when the President or the Secretary of Health and Human Services exercise their public health emergency legal authority. This site acts as a portal for residents in the U.S. and worldwide to obtain information from all U.S. federal agencies involved in a public health emergency, a medical disaster or the public health aspects of a natural or man-made disaster.

== Purpose ==
Using PublicHealthEmergency.gov, visitors can find the current status and actions taken by the federal government in preparing for and responding to public health emergencies and medical disasters and links to report potential public health threats. The site includes information about medical response, emergency support functions and medical assistance available through the federal government for domestic and international emergencies. PublicHealthEmergency.gov provides detailed information on a wide variety of preparedness efforts, including federal support for basic and advanced research and development of medical countermeasures for public health threats.

The site also supplies responders with information on physical safety and mental health, and guidance for handling specific public health emergencies.

== Legal Authority and Governance ==
The site is maintained by the HHS Office of the Assistant Secretary for Preparedness and Response to meet public information requirements of the Pandemic and All-Hazards Preparedness Act of 2006 (PAHPA), Public Law No. 109-417. Congress passed PAHPA "to improve the Nation's public health and medical preparedness and response capabilities for emergencies, whether deliberate, accidental, or natural." The Act established within HHS an Assistant Secretary for Preparedness and Response; guides HHS preparedness and response activities; provides specific authorities, including the advanced development and acquisitions of medical countermeasures, and called for a quadrennial National Health Security Strategy.
