= Community Health Services and Facilities Act =

US law

- Long title: An Act to assist in expanding and improving community facilities and services for the health care of aged and other persons, and for other purposes.
- Nicknames: Community Health Services and Facilities Act of 1961
- Enacted by: the 87th United States Congress
- Effective: October 5, 1961

Citations
- Public law: 87-395
- Statutes at Large: 75 Stat. 824

Legislative history
- Introduced in the House as H.R. 4998 by Oren Harris (D–AR) on June 27, 1961; Committee consideration by House Interstate and Foreign Commerce, Senate Labor and Public Welfare; Passed the House on July 25, 1961 (Passed); Passed the Senate on September 1, 1961 (Passed); Reported by the joint conference committee on September 18, 1961; agreed to by the Senate on September 18, 1961 (Agreed) and by the House on September 20, 1961 (Agreed); Signed into law by President John F. Kennedy on October 5, 1961

The United States Community Health Services and Facilities Act (Pub. L. 87–395, 75 Stat. 824) was enacted by the 87th United States Congress and signed into law on October 5, 1961. Its passage was encouraged by the 1961 White House Conference on Aging, which is held once every ten years.

The 1961 act funded grants to the states for the expansion of medical services facilities like nursing homes, and medical programs for general public health and outpatient services for the elderly. It also extended and strengthened the 1946 Hill–Burton Act.

== See also ==
- Community Mental Health Act
- United States Department of Health and Human Services
