= Temporary EHR Certification Program =

On June 18, 2010, The United States Department of Health and Human Services released 45 CFR part 170, Establishment of the Temporary Certification Program for Health Information Technology. The rule establishes a temporary certification program for the purposes of testing and certifying health information technology. The temporary certification program will authorize organizations to test and certify Complete Electronic Health Records (EHRs) and/or EHR Modules.
