= Andrew C. Weber =

American national security expert

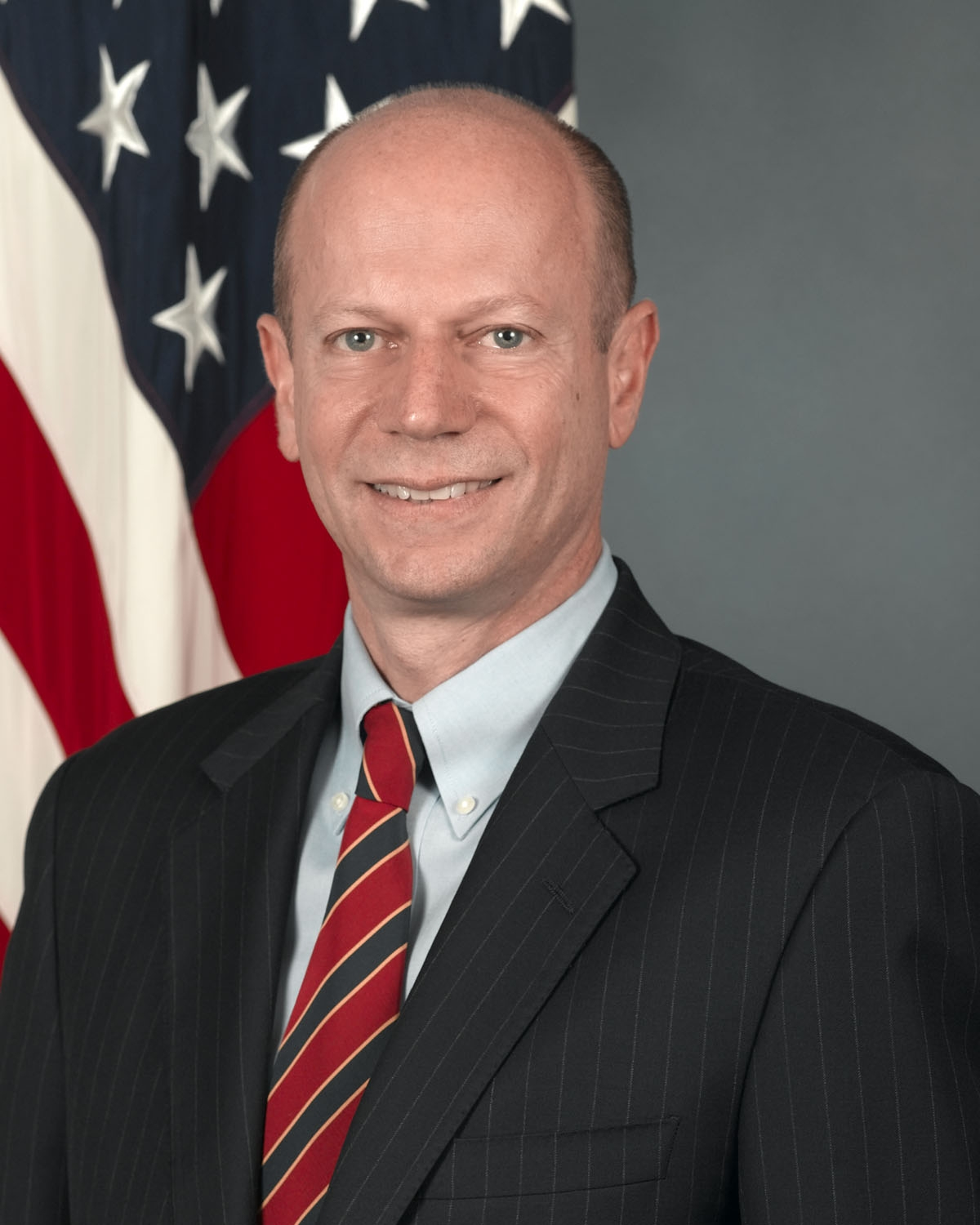

Assistant Secretary of Defense for Nuclear, Chemical & Biological Defense Programs
- In office May 18, 2009 – October 1, 2014
- President: Barack Obama
- Preceded by: Fred Celec
- Succeeded by: Guy B. Roberts (2017)

Personal details
- Born: April 28, 1960 (age 65) New York, New York
- Education: Master of Science in Foreign Service (MSFS), Georgetown University; Bachelor of Arts, Cornell University
- Occupation: National security official
- Awards: Office of the Secretary of Defense Medal for Exceptional Civilian Service

Andrew (Andy) Charles Weber (born 28 April 1960) is an American national security expert specializing in global health security and countering weapons of mass destruction. He is a Senior Fellow at the Council on Strategic Risks, a national security think tank based in Washington, DC.

During the Obama Administration, he served for five years as the Assistant Secretary of Defense for Nuclear, Chemical & Biological Defense Programs, whose areas of responsibility include the U.S. nuclear, chemical, and biological defense programs. Appointed by President Obama, he was confirmed by the U.S. Senate on 18 May 2009 and served until 1 October 2014. In addition, he coordinated U.S. leadership of the international Ebola response for the Department of State in 2014-15.

== Early life ==
Born in New York City, Weber graduated from Scarsdale High School in 1978. He earned a Bachelor of Arts degree from Cornell University in 1982 and received a Master of Science in Foreign Service (MSFS) degree from Georgetown University in 1986.

== Career ==
He played a key role in the Nunn–Lugar Cooperative Threat Reduction efforts to remove weapons grade uranium from Kazakhstan and Georgia, and nuclear capable Mikoyan MiG-29 from Moldova, and to destroy Libyan and Syrian chemical weapons stockpiles.

Weber also oversaw and developed the Defense Threat Reduction Agency and for his work has twice been awarded the Exceptional Civilian Service Medal. He served previously as a United States Foreign Service Officer.

From 2002 to 2008, Weber taught a course on Force and Diplomacy at the Edmund A. Walsh School of Foreign Service in Georgetown University. Between 2016 and 2017, he and was a Senior Fellow at the Harvard Kennedy School’s Belfer Center for Science and International Affairs.

He is a member of the Council on Foreign Relations, and serves on multiple boards, including Healthcare Ready and the James Martin Center for Non-proliferation Studies International Advisory Council.

Government offices
Preceded by Fred Celec	Assistant Secretary of Defense for Nuclear, Chemical & Biological Defense Programs; May 18, 2009 – October 1, 2014	Succeeded by Guy B. Roberts
