= Robert Kadlec =

American physician and government official

- Official portrait

Assistant Secretary of Defense for Nuclear Deterrence, Chemical, and Biological Defense Policy and Programs
- Incumbent
- Assumed office December 29, 2025
- President: Donald Trump
- Preceded by: Deborah Rosenblum

Assistant Secretary of Health and Human Services for Preparedness and Response
- In office August 18, 2017 – January 20, 2021
- President: Donald Trump
- Preceded by: George Korch (Acting)
- Succeeded by: Nikki Bratcher-Bowman (Acting); Dawn O’Connell

Personal details
- Born: approx. 1957
- Party: Republican
- Education: United States Air Force Academy (BS); Uniformed Services University of the Health Sciences (MD); Georgetown University (MS)

Robert Peter Kadlec (/ˈkædlɪk/ KAD-lik) is an American physician and career officer in the United States Air Force who served as Assistant Secretary of Health and Human Services (Preparedness and Response) from August 2017 until January 2021. He is responsible for the creation of the COVID-19 vaccine development program Operation Warp Speed. He currently serves as the Assistant Secretary of Defense for Nuclear Deterrence, Chemical, and Biological Defense Policy and Programs.

== Early life ==
Kadlec graduated with a B.S. from the United States Air Force Academy in 1979, an M.D. from the Uniformed Services University of the Health Sciences in 1983, and an M.A. from Georgetown University in 1989.

== Career ==
Kadlec spent 26 years as a career officer and physician in the United States Air Force. He was awarded the Bronze Star Medal for service in Iraq. In the White House Homeland Security Council, Kadlec was Director for Biodefense and Special Assistant to President George W. Bush for Biodefense Policy from 2007 to 2009. He retired as a Colonel.

Kadlec was Deputy Staff Director for the United States Senate Select Committee on Intelligence when he was nominated by President Donald Trump to become Assistant Secretary for Preparedness and Response (ASPR), an office within Health and Human Services. Kadlec was confirmed for this position by the United States Senate on August 3, 2017, by voice vote.

=== Office of Preparedness and Response ===
In January 2018, Kadlec testified to the U.S. Congress that the US was dangerously unprepared for a pandemic. Prior to the COVID-19 pandemic, Kadlec had heavily focused the office on preparing for a response to bioterror attacks, a choice that was later scrutinized. From January through March 2020, Kadlec and his team focused on evacuating U.S. nationals from cruise ships and countries hard-hit by the pandemic; Kadlec's defenders said that this focus was necessary to protect Americans, while detractors criticized him for missing opportunities to prepare for pandemic COVID-19 in the United States. Notably, he overruled CDC scientists who objected to the joint evacuation with minimal precautions (separation from non-infected people only by a thin plastic sheet) of Diamond Princess passengers infected with COVID-19.

In April 2020, Kadlec demoted federal scientist Rick Bright, removing him from his position as head of the Biomedical Advanced Research and Development Authority (BARDA) and reassigning him to a lower post at the National Institutes of Health. The following month, Bright filed a wide-ranging whistleblower complaint against Kadlec and several Trump administration officials. Bright asserted that Kadlec ousted him in retaliation for his "insistence" that the federal government focus resources on "safe and scientifically vetted solutions" against the COVID-19 pandemic rather than "technologies that lack scientific merit" such as the use of hydroxychloroquine, which had been pushed by the Trump administration. Bright also alleged that in January 2020, Kadlec had delayed acting to obtain face masks, testing swabs, and other materials for which there was later a shortage. Supporters of Bright and supporters of Kadlec each accused the other "of preferential treatment for favored contractors and inappropriate spending decisions." HHS denied that Bright had been retaliated against, but the Office of Special Counsel recommended Bright's reinstatement as BARDA chief, finding a "substantial likelihood of wrongdoing" in his ouster.

=== Operation Warp Speed ===
Kadlec led the formation of the COVID-19 vaccine development program named Operation Warp Speed (OWS). In April 2020, Kadlec worked with Peter Marks (physician), director of the Center for Biologics Evaluation and Research (CBER) at the Food and Drug Administration (FDA) to develop OWS. Kadlec and Marks wrote a proposal for then Secretary of the Department of Health and Human Services (HHS) Alex Azar detailing how Operation Warp Speed would screen potential vaccine candidates and eventually distribute final product to all Americans.

A memo circulated by Kadlec and Marks to Azar on April 12 was the first detailed accounting of OWS’ goals:

"Project Warp Speed
Maximally expediting a safe, effective vaccine
A safe, effective, broadly administered vaccine is the single most important solution to the Covid-19 pandemic
MISSION: Maximally expedite the development of a safe and effective vaccine with sufficient scale to inoculate all Americans who need it
DEADLINE: Enable broad access to the public by October 2020
PLAN: Modeled after the Manhattan Project approach, a multi-disciplinary, multi-sector team that brings the numerous in-flight efforts under a single authority to drive relentless coordination, barrier elimination, and accountability for mission success"

Kadlec was responsible for setting the aggressive deadline of October 2020 to complete simultaneous clinical trials and roll out the vaccine to the American public. Recognizing the national security importance of OWS, Azar and Kadlec also worked to enlist the Department of Defense (DoD) as a key partner in both the science and the logistics.

While OWS was initially named “Project Warp Speed,” Kadlec would later rename it to “Operation Warp Speed” to better reflect the role DoD would play. On April 24, 2020, Kadlec approved the first communications between FDA and companies who would eventually partner with the government to successfully develop and distribute COVID-19 vaccines. OWS was announced to the public on May 15, 2020.

=== Emergent BioSolutions inquiry ===
Kadlec, before becoming Assistant Secretary for Preparedness and Response in 2017, consulted for Emergent BioSolutions and co-owned a company linked to its founder, without disclosing this during his Senate confirmation. After taking office, he secured a $2.8 billion, 10-year contract for smallpox vaccines from Emergent, raising concerns about conflicts of interest. A congressional inquiry followed after 15 million Janssen COVID-19 vaccine doses were ruined at Emergent's Baltimore facility, focusing on Emergent's ties to the Trump administration, quality control issues, and an 800% price hike for anthrax vaccines. Kadlec was also scrutinized for backing a $628 million award to Emergent. The inquiry was not pursued further.

=== Office of the Secretary of Defense ===
On December 29, 2025, Kadlec began serving as the Assistant Secretary of Defense for Nuclear Deterrence, Chemical, and Biological Defense Policy and Programs.
