= White House Conference on Aging =

The White House Conference on Aging (WHCoA) is a once-a-decade conference sponsored by the Executive Office of the President of the United States which makes policy recommendations to the president and Congress regarding the aged. The first of its kind, the goals of the conference are to promote the dignity, health and economic security of older Americans. It has been claimed that it is perhaps the best-known White House conference. The conference is held once a decade, with the most recent conference held in 2015, in preparation for the retirement of the baby boomer generation.

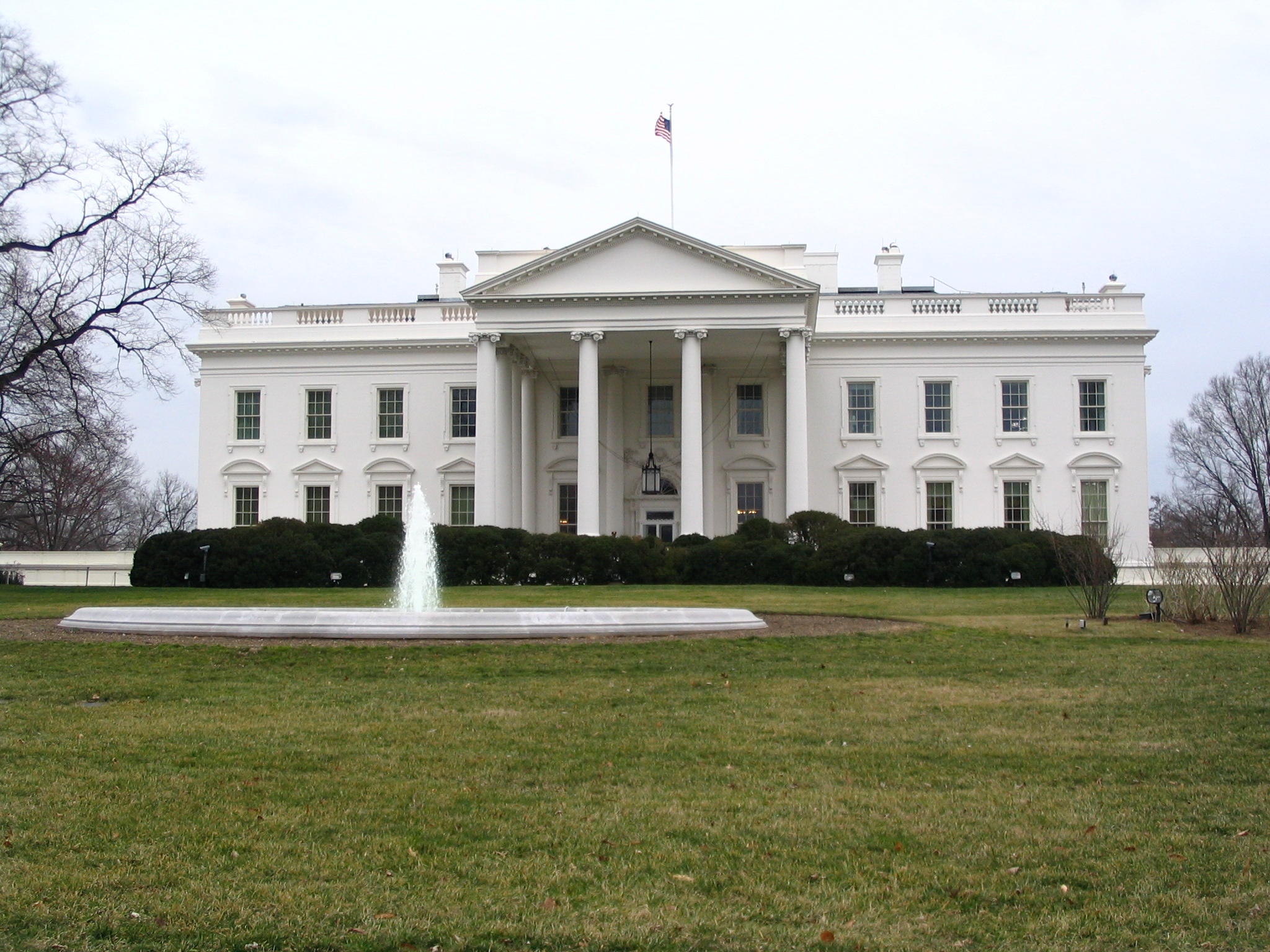
The White House

== History ==
=== Early conferences and councils ===
In 1950, President Harry S Truman ordered the Federal Security Agency to hold a national conference on aging. The purpose was to assess the policy challenges posed by a changing populace, particularly in light of numerous changes in federal entitlement programs (such as Social Security) that had been enacted during the previous 20 years. Social Security's goal was to assist those in need of financial assistance such as the poor, elderly, physically disabled or mentally ill.

In 1956 President Dwight D. Eisenhower established the Federal-State Council on Aging to more effectively coordinate policy and to help determine the "resources of the States and of the Federal government that can be mobilized in an attack on the problems of the later years." A group gathered for a 3-day conference in Washington, DC, to explore solutions for seniors that could benefit from coordination of Federal and State Resources.

=== 1961 conference ===
In 1958, Congressman John E. Fogarty introduced legislation calling for a White House conference on aging. Congress enacted the White House Conference on Aging Act (Public Law 85-908), and the bill was signed by President Dwight D. Eisenhower. The law called for a national citizens' forum to focus attention on the problems of older Americans and to make consensus policy recommendations on how to enhance the economic security of this demographic group. A national advisory committee for the White House Conference on Aging was formed the same year.

In 1961 President Eisenhower hosted the first White House Conference on Aging. More than 3,000 people attended, representing nearly 300 organizations. The original goal of the conference was "to provide a forum for representatives of older Americans throughout the country to discuss and propose solutions to the unique problems facing the elderly in this country." The conference led directly to the passage of the 1961 Social Security amendments, the Senior Citizens Housing Act of 1962, the Community Health Services and Facilities Act, Medicare, Medicaid and the Older Americans Act.

=== 1971 conference ===
Congressional legislation in 1968 directed that another conference be held in 1971. The 4,000 attendees at the 1971 conference recommended more than 193 actions, some of which led directly to the founding of the Senate Special Committee on Aging and the Federal Council on Aging.

=== 1981 conference ===
Legislation in 1977 led to a 1981 conference, which was attended by 2,000 delegates, and was the first to use a quota-like system to ensure that various segments of the population—such as women, minorities and the disabled—were sufficiently represented. Ethnic, racial, demographic and others subgroups were also encouraged to hold their own caucuses, seminars and workshops in conjunction with the conference.

=== 1995 conference ===
Congressional amendments to the Older Americans Act which passed in 1992, led to another conference in 1995. Planning for the 1995 conference was much broader than in the past, but also more conservative. More than 125,000 people participated in more than 1,000 mini-conferences around the country during the two-year planning process. While few new initiatives were proposed, support for existing programs was reaffirmed. Additionally, the 2,200 delegates and 800 observers argued for a shift away from a focus on the aged and toward a policy on "aging."

=== 2005 conference ===
The Older Americans Act Amendments of 2000 directed that the next conference be held in 2005, and it took place from December 11 to December 14 in Washington, D.C. About 50 recommendations came from the conference; many relating to the transportation needs of the elderly, mental health and overhaul of the Medicare prescription drug benefit.

The White House Conference on Aging held in 2005 was named "The Booming Dynamics of Aging: From Awareness to Action" and attracted one thousand two hundred delegates from across the country. Along with a 17-member bi-partisan policy committee, a 22-member advisory committee compiled a list of 73 resolutions to contribute to a strategy on how to accommodate and care for the nation's growing elderly population. The 2005 White House Conference on Aging experienced a first-time event of the current president not addressing the Delegates. Then-President Bush was at a retirement village in Northern Virginia and avoided the White House Conference on Aging to steer clear of concerned older adults, policy makers, and advocates on the new Medicare Part D Plan many were not pleased with.

The 2005 conference's main agenda was to propose solutions on how to accommodate the 73 million baby boomers in the next 40 years as they move into and through the older years of life. The aging of the baby boomer population will cause the percentage of the U.S. population over 65 to grow from 9% in 1940 to an expected 19% by 2030. Seventy-three resolutions were created with 50 of them being presented to the president and Congress.

Beginning in August 2004, 130,000 people contributed to four types of forums around the country. These forums were created to develop solutions to aging challenges in preparation for the 2005 conference. Listening sessions and independent aging agenda events confirmed that communities around the country have implemented their own ways of accommodating the growing elderly population. Solutions forums asked contributors to put themselves in the place of the elderly, in order to understand what accommodations they would want and need from legislation. Mini conferences concentrated on specific issues and the Conference took the suggestions and comments into consideration.

General session presentations from the government concerning economic projections, and the private sector concerning topics such as geriatric medicine attributed to a wide range of information.

==== Associated events ====
Get Involved: A WHCoA Service Project worked to focus attention on the importance of civic engagement and community service, this Pre-Conference event was organized by the Corporation for National and Community Service and the Washington, D.C. Jewish Community Center. Volunteers from Senior Corps joined Conference delegates to help rehabilitate the Educational Organization for United Latin Americans (EOFULA), a Washington, D.C. community center for Latino senior citizens. Braving frigid weather, delegates and volunteers painted, repaired and weatherized the senior center.

Healthy Living Celebration! was organized to highlight the importance of healthy living and to demonstrate the commitment of the 2005 WHCoA to health and wellness while demonstrating that physical activity can be fun. These goals were accomplished through the leadership of the President’s Council on Physical Fitness and Sports, who co-sponsored the event with assistance from the National Senior Games Association (NSGA). Delegates also participated in the Profiles of Wellness Program and the President's Challenge Program.

The 2005 White House Conference on Aging Exhibit Hall was the first WHCoA exhibit hall to highlight technology. Co-sponsored by ZivaGuide, a customized health care information provider, the Exhibit Hall featured more than 140 exhibitors representing a wide variety of public, private and non-profit organizations, and firms and government agencies presenting some of the latest initiatives and innovations in providing services to the aging community.

Large portions of the Exhibit Hall were dedicated to highlighting the potential of technology to transform aging in America. The conference's technology exhibit was the largest ever held by the Center for Aging Services Technologies (CAST), and included some of America's leading technology companies and universities who assembled dozens of ground-breaking technologies to give policy makers a glimpse of how technology could transform the lives of older adults and those who care for them.

Another portion of the Exhibit Hall, sponsored by the Department of Transportation, was dedicated to illuminating promising trends and programs in improving mobility for America’s seniors.

==== Call to action ====
In the past conferences, delegates found a low rate of resolution implementation. A majority of time was spent on creating resolutions rather than implementing them. The number of representatives decreased from former Conferences. Once again, a focus of quality over quantity proved to be a theme of the 2005 Conference. Each member of Congress, House of Representatives, and Senate sent representatives presenting a wide range of opinions on behalf of those who elected them.

The central idea coming from the 2005 Conference was “that we must now modernize our aging policies for the 21st Century to deal with the challenges we are facing and those we see on the horizon.” A set of philosophies were developed to promote forward thinking and a call to action.

A set of steps were developed for the leaders to execute the goals created at the Conference.

First was to "proactively realign and modernize current aging programs and networks to be more efficient and effective in their performance, so as to free-up resources for unmet needs." Since the original programs were implemented, they have proven to be beneficial for the older generations.

Second was to "transform the “world of aging” policies, programs, and organizations from a series of “stove-pipes” into a 21st Century system of coordinated services and networks that will meet the future needs of the baby boomers, while also improving services to current seniors. Programs should be updated to accommodate new technology, while serving the original purpose of improving the quality of life for the elderly.

Third was to "proactively work to fully integrate the efforts of Federal, State, Tribal, local and community, private, and not-for-profit stakeholders." Each sector needs to know their role and where they are responsible for collaboration.

== Bibliography ==
- Arceneaux, Ivan. "Seniors‚ Transportation Finally Get Attention." Galveston Daily News. December 19, 2006.
- Due, Verna E. "Report on the White House Conference on Aging." (1961). Proceedings from the Kirkpatrick Memorial Conference. Muncie, IN.
- "History: The WHCoA Conferences." White House Conference on Aging. September 27, 2004. accessed January 7, 2007.
- Jaffe, Susan. "Delegates to Conference on Aging Quietly Send Bush a To-Do List." Cleveland Plain Dealer. September 30, 2006.
- Martin, John B. "The 1971 White House Conference on Aging". (1970) Proceedings from the Kirkpatrick Memorial Conference. Muncie, IN.
- Nohlgren, Stephen. "Medicare Drug Plan Overhaul Demanded; Four-day Aging Conference Opens Without Bush." Bradenton Herald. December 14, 2005.
- Segal, Elizabeth A.; Gerdes, Karen E.; and Steiner, Sue. An Introduction to the Profession of Social Work: Becoming a Change Agent. Belmont, Calif.: Cengage Learning, 2010.
- Swartz, Ray. "Reflections on the 1971 White House Conference on Aging." (1972) Proceedings from the Kirkpatrick Memorial Conference. Muncie, IN.
- Gloth, F. Michael III (2007). "2005 White House Conference on Aging: a new day for White House Conferences on Aging and food for the future". Journal of the American Geriatrics Society. 55 (2): 305–307. doi:10.1111/j.1532-5415.2007.01051.x.
