= Guy B. Roberts =

American lawyer

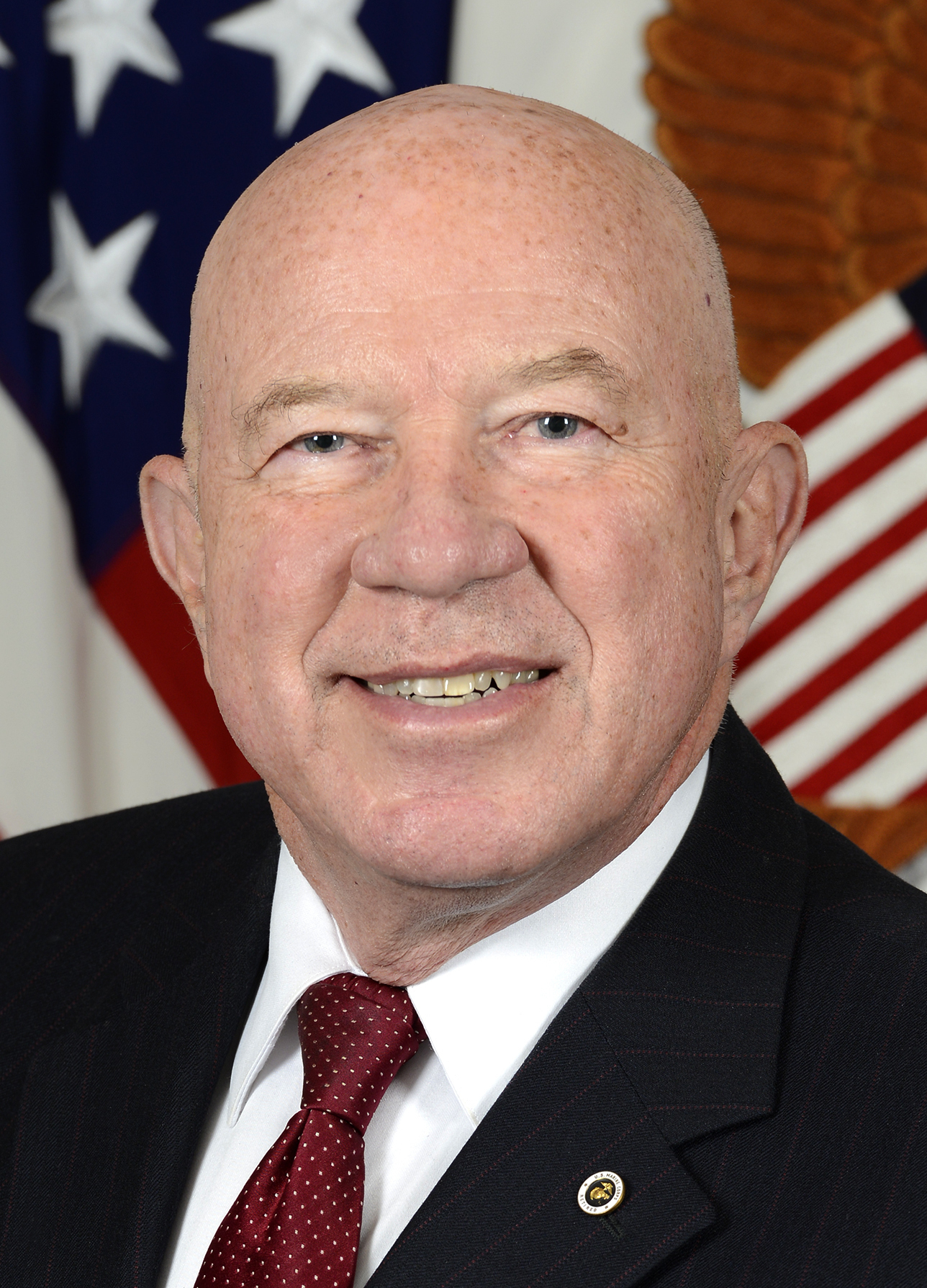

Assistant Secretary of Defense for Nuclear, Chemical & Biological Defense Programs
- In office November 30, 2017 – April 2, 2019
- President: Donald Trump
- Preceded by: Andrew C. Weber (2014)
- Succeeded by: Deborah Rosenblum

Personal details
- Education: Arizona State University; University of Denver School of Law; Georgetown University; University of Southern California; Naval War College

Guy B. Roberts is an American government official, lawyer, and retired United States Marine Corps colonel who served as the Assistant Secretary of Defense for Nuclear, Chemical, and Biological Defense Programs from 2017 to 2019. He previously was the president of GBR Consulting, a national security consulting firm. Earlier in his career he spent 25 years in the Marine Corps and then held senior arms control posts at the Department of Defense and at NATO.

Roberts resigned in April 2019, two months after the Department of Defense Office of Inspector General began investigating a complaint about his conduct toward members of his staff. The inspector general's report, made public in December 2019, concluded that he had sexually harassed three women who worked for him; Roberts disagreed with its findings.

== Education ==
Roberts took a bachelor's degree in political science magna cum laude at Arizona State University and a law degree at the University of Denver. He holds master's degrees in international and comparative law from Georgetown University, in international relations from the University of Southern California and in national security and strategic studies from the Naval War College, where he graduated with highest distinction and won the Stephen B. Luce Award for academic achievement. He has been admitted to practice in Colorado, California and Arizona, and before the military court of criminal appeals and the Supreme Court of the United States.

== Marine Corps service ==
He served for 25 years in the United States Marine Corps, concluding his career as the Staff Judge Advocate for U.S. Southern Command and retiring as a colonel. His assignments were as an infantry officer, a judge advocate and a staff officer.

== Arms control posts and private practice ==
After leaving the Marine Corps, Roberts was the acting Deputy Assistant Secretary of Defense for Arms Control and Nonproliferation Policy. He previously served as the Deputy Assistant Secretary General for Weapons of Mass Destruction Policy and Director of Nuclear Policy for the North Atlantic Treaty Organization.

He then worked as an independent consultant and an adjunct professor. Roberts was also a senior associate with the Center for Strategic and International Studies and an adjunct professor teaching courses on homeland security, international terrorism, non-proliferation, and arms control at Mary Washington University and Virginia Commonwealth University. He received the Exceptional Public Service Award from the Department of Defense.

== Assistant Secretary of Defense ==
President Donald Trump announced his intention to nominate Roberts as Assistant Secretary of Defense for Nuclear, Chemical and Biological Defense Programs on July 17, 2017. The Senate confirmed him by unanimous voice vote on November 16, 2017, in a group of eight Pentagon nominees that also included Robert Wilkie, Joseph D. Kernan and Robert H. McMahon, and he took office on November 30.

In the post Roberts was the principal adviser to the Secretary of Defense on nuclear weapons, nuclear energy and chemical and biological defense, and served as staff director of the Nuclear Weapons Council. His office comprised the Office of Nuclear Matters, the Office of Chemical and Biological Defense Programs and the Office of Threat Reduction and Arms Control, and exercised authority over the Defense Threat Reduction Agency. Testifying before the committee's emerging threats and capabilities subcommittee in March 2018, he described the central challenge to his portfolio as renewed strategic competition with China and Russia, citing Russia's nuclear doctrine, its actions in Ukraine, its use of a chemical weapon in an assassination attempt in Britain and its violation of the Intermediate-Range Nuclear Forces Treaty.

In June 2019, it was reported by Foreign Policy that Roberts had resigned from his position as Assistant Secretary of Defense for Nuclear, Chemical, and Biological Defense Programs effective April 2, 2019. The department did not explain the departure at the time.

== Inspector general investigation ==
The Department of Defense Office of Inspector General opened an investigation in February 2019 after an employee complained about Roberts's conduct; he resigned two months later. The inspector general interviewed 18 witnesses and reviewed more than 4,000 emails and documents. Its report, published on December 12, 2019, substantiated allegations that Roberts had "engaged in a pattern of misconduct in which he sexually harassed women on his staff", finding that he had made "deliberate, unwelcomed physical contact of a sexual nature by hugging, kissing or touching" three women who worked for him and had created a hostile work environment by repeatedly making sexual comments to staff.

Roberts said that he was "surprised and dismayed" by the conclusions, that any contact had been unintentional and that the women had not told him his behavior was inappropriate, while accepting that some of his jokes had been inappropriate. The inspector general found that at least one of the women had told him on several occasions that his behavior was unwelcome, and that he knew or should have known that the physical contact and the comments were inappropriate. Because Roberts had already left the department, the report made no recommendations; it was placed in his personnel file.

== Publications ==
- Moore, John Norton; Roberts, Guy B.; Turner, Robert F., eds. (2005). National Security Law Documents. Carolina Academic Press. ISBN 978-1-59460-024-1.
- Moore, John Norton; Roberts, Guy B.; Turner, Robert F., eds. (2015). National Security Law & Policy. Carolina Academic Press. ISBN 978-1-61163-704-5.
