= Dawn O'Connell =

American government official

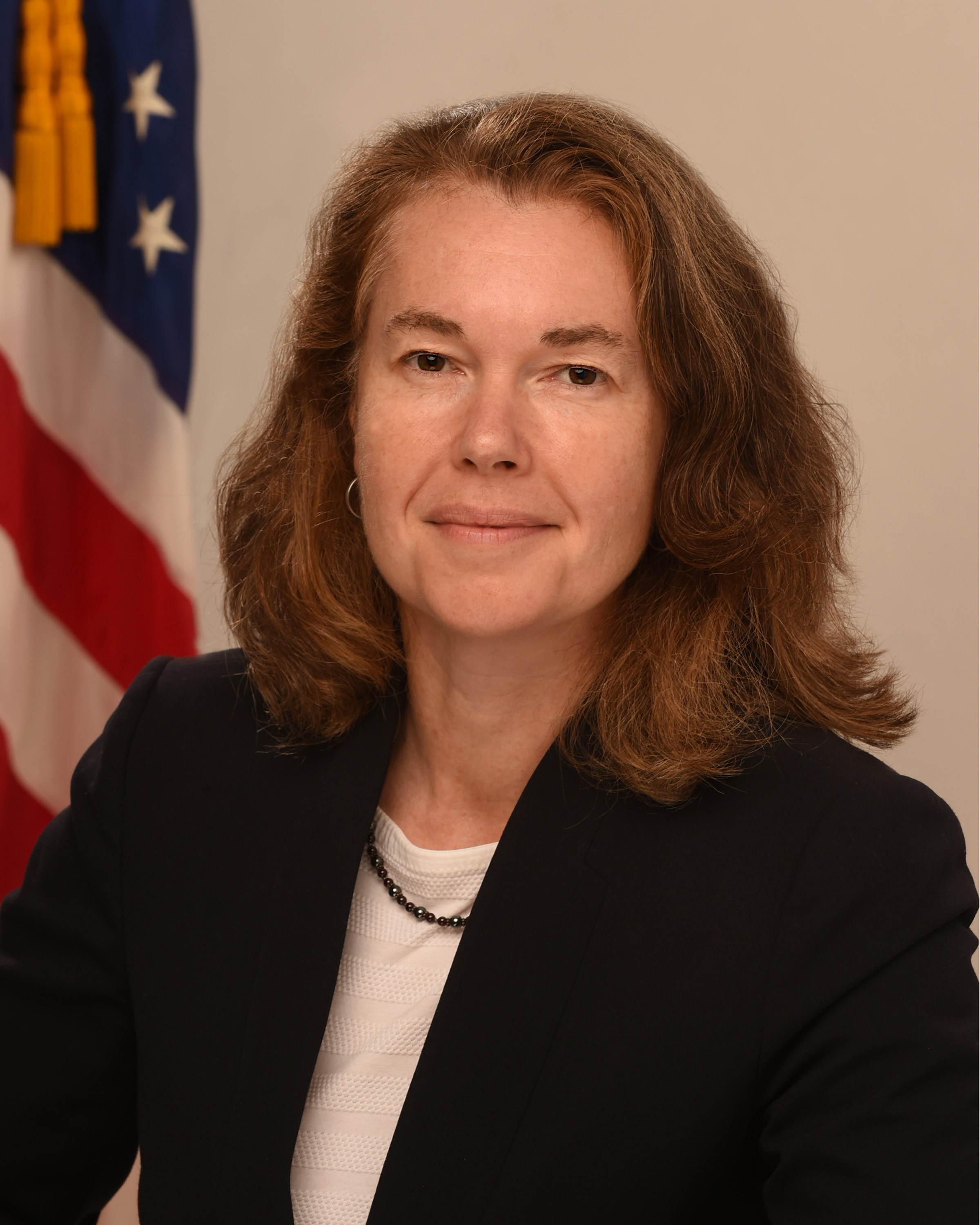

Assistant Secretary of Health and Human Services for Preparedness and Response
- In office June 28, 2021 – January 20, 2025
- President: Joe Biden
- Secretary: Xavier Becerra
- Preceded by: Robert Kadlec
- Succeeded by: Vacant

Personal details
- Education: Vanderbilt University (BA); Tulane University (JD)

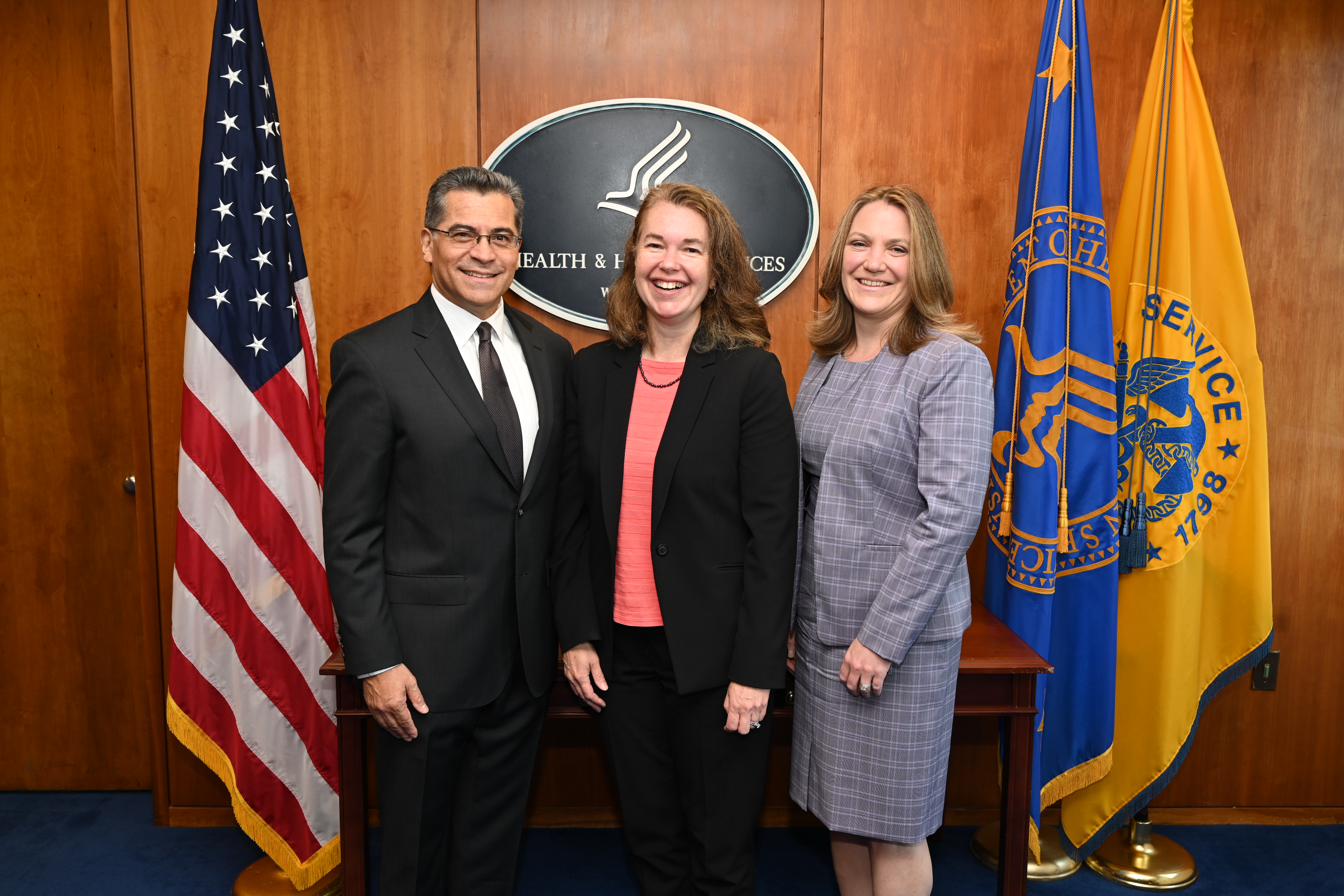
Dawn O'Connell being sworn in by Xavier Becerra (2021)

Dawn Myers O'Connell is an American attorney and health advisor who had served as the Assistant Secretary of Health and Human Services for Preparedness and Response.

== Education ==
O'Connell received a Bachelor of Arts degree in literature from Vanderbilt University and a Juris Doctor from Tulane University School of Law.

== Career ==
O'Connell served as senior counselor to then-Secretary Sylvia Mathews Burwell during the Obama administration, advising her on high-priority global health and humanitarian issues, infectious diseases, unaccompanied children, and refugees.

In 2017, O'Connell joined the Coalition for Epidemic Preparedness Innovations (CEPI), where she served as director of its U.S. office. As the director, she was responsible for managing the broad spectrum of CEPI's U.S. and North American interests including its relationships with U.S. and North American-based stakeholders, government entities, and industry partners. She also served as the executive director for CEPI's Joint Coordination Group, a roundtable of institutional partners who all have a vested interest in the successful development and deployment of epidemic vaccines.

Since February 16, 2021, she has served as the senior counselor to the Secretary for COVID-19, where she coordinates the Department-wide response to the pandemic.

=== Biden administration ===
On March 19, 2021, President Joe Biden nominated O'Connell to be the Assistant Secretary of Health and Human Services for Preparedness and Response. Hearings were held on the nomination by the Senate HELP Committee on June 8, 2021. On June 16, 2021, the nomination was reported favorably out of committee. On June 24, 2021, O'Connell was confirmed in the Senate by voice vote. She was sworn in on June 28, 2021.
