= Deborah Rosenblum =

American nuclear expert

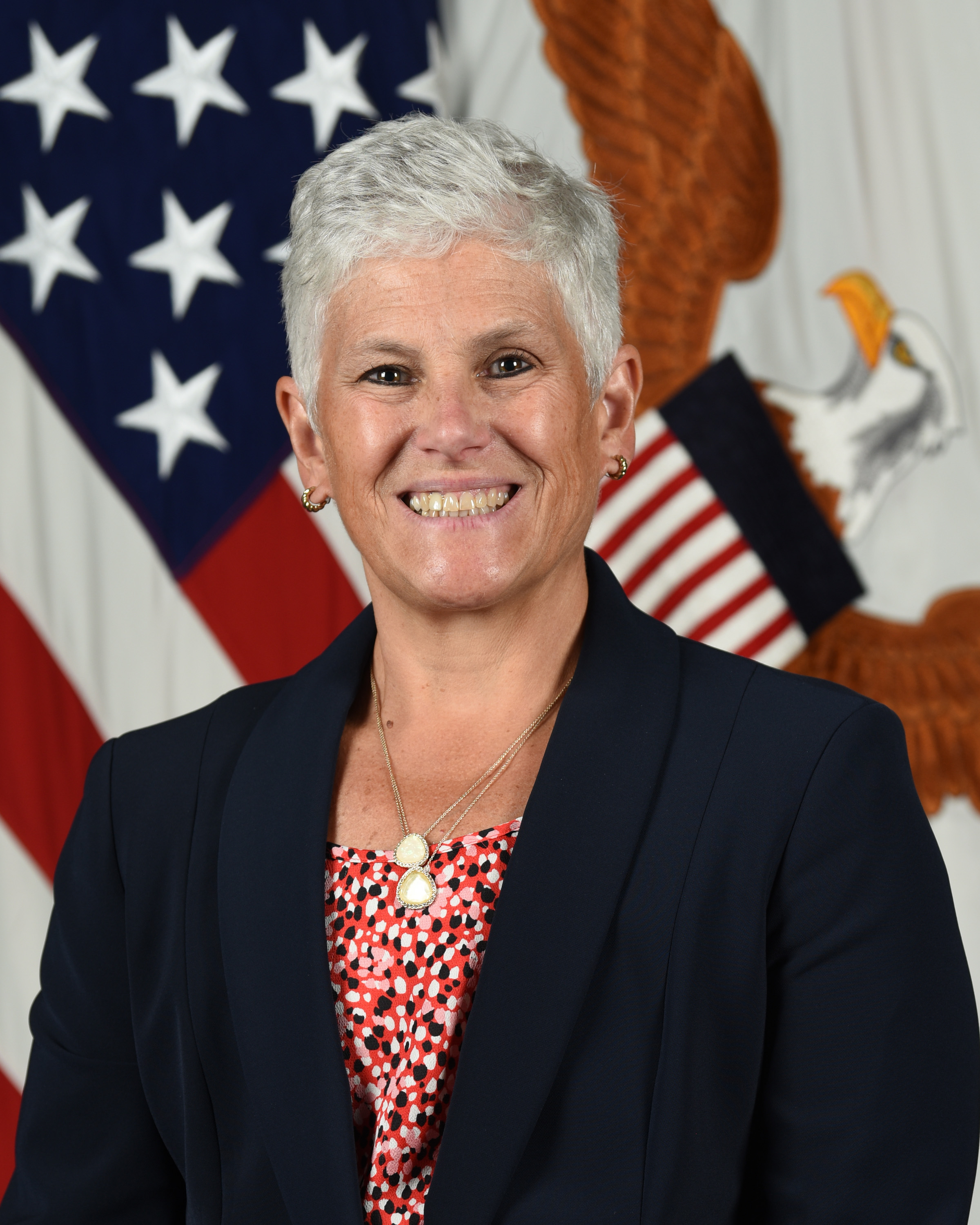

Assistant Secretary of Defense for Nuclear, Chemical & Biological Defense Programs
- In office August 4, 2021 – April 8, 2024
- President: Joe Biden
- Preceded by: Guy B. Roberts
- Succeeded by: Robert Kadlec

Personal details
- Born: 1962
- Party: Democratic
- Education: Middlebury College (BS); Columbia University (MIA)
- Deborah Rosenblum's voice Rosenblum's opening statement at a House Armed Services Strategic Forces Subcommittee hearing on the FY2024 nuclear forces budget request Recorded March 28, 2023

Deborah G. Rosenblum is an American nuclear expert and former career civil servant. She had served as the Acting Deputy Under Secretary of Defense for Acquisition and Sustainment and previously had served Assistant Secretary of Defense for Nuclear, Chemical & Biological Defense Programs in the Biden administration.

== Education and career ==
Rosenblum holds a master’s degree from Columbia University’s School of International and Public Affairs and is a Phi Beta Kappa graduate with a bachelor’s degree from Middlebury College. Rosenblum was a vice president with The Cohen Group, an international consulting firm. She has also served as a career civil servant for 12 years in the Office of the Secretary of Defense, including as a member of the Senior Executive Service. She worked in the areas of nuclear forces, counter-proliferation policy, countering narcotics, homeland defense, and peacekeeping operations and support. She also represented the United States in multi-year bilateral negotiations with North Korea around its nuclear program. Immediately prior to serving as Assistant Secretary of Defense for NCB, Rosenblum was the Executive Vice President of the Nuclear Threat Initiative; she was part of NTI’s executive leadership team and helped oversee the organization’s threat reduction programs, operations and development as well as co-chaired NTI’s task force on diversity, equity and inclusion. She served as an advisor to President-elect Biden during his presidential transition.

=== Nomination as Assistant Secretary of Defense ===
On April 23, 2021, President Joe Biden announced Rosenblum as his nominee to be the Assistant Secretary of Defense for Nuclear, Chemical & Biological Defense Programs. On April 27, 2021, her nomination was sent to the United States Senate. On May 27, 2021, a hearing was held on her nomination before the Senate Armed Services Committee. On July 29, she was confirmed by unanimous consent in the US Senate.
