= Nicole Lurie =

American public health official

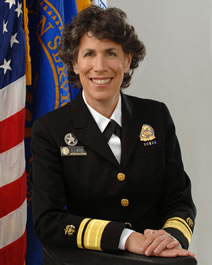

Personal details
- Education: University of Pennsylvania (BS, MD) (University of California, Los Angeles (MPH)

Nicole Lurie is an American physician, professor of medicine, and public health leader. She is Executive Director for Preparedness and Response at the Coalition for Epidemic Preparedness Innovations (CEPI) and Director of CEPI-US. She is also a Lecturer at Harvard Medical School and adjunct professor at the George Washington University School of Medicine. During the administration of President Barack Obama, she was Assistant Secretary for Preparedness and Response (ASPR) at the United States Department of Health and Human Services (HHS) from 2009 through the end of the president's second term. The mission of the Office of the Assistant Secretary for Preparedness and Response is to "lead the nation in preventing, responding to and recovering from the adverse health effects of public health emergencies and disasters, ranging from hurricanes to bioterrorism."

== Education ==
Lurie received her bachelor's degree from the University of Pennsylvania and her M.D. from the University of Pennsylvania Medical School in 1979. Lurie received her Master of Science in Public Health from the University of California, Los Angeles (UCLA), where she also completed her medical residency. Lurie was a Robert Wood Johnson Foundation Clinical Scholar at UCLA.

== Career ==
Lurie practiced primary care medicine and joined the University of Minnesota in 1985. At the University of Minnesota Medical School and University of Minnesota School of Public Health, Lurie rose to become professor of medicine and public health, director of primary care research, and director of the Division of General Internal Medicine. Lurie also worked in state government and served as medical advisor to the commissioner of the Minnesota Department of Health.

In 1998, Lurie took leave from her position in Minnesota to become Principal Deputy Assistant Secretary for Health in the U.S. Department of Health and Human Services, holding this position until 2001. In this role, Lurie worked on the Healthy People 2010 initiative and initiative to reduce health disparities, as well as pandemic influenza planning.

After leaving HHS, Lurie became senior natural scientist and the Paul O'Neill Alcoa Professor of Health Policy at the Arlington, Virginia-based Rand Corporation, a think tank. Lurie directed the organization's Center for Population Health and Health Disparities and oversaw its work on public health and preparedness. Lurie testified before the Subcommittee on Bioterrorism and Public Health Preparedness of the Senate Committee on Health, Education, Labor and Pensions in March 2006, explaining that "her work included evaluating public health preparedness in California and Georgia; conducting 32 tabletop exercises on hypothetical crises caused by smallpox, anthrax, botulism, plague, and pandemic influenza; and interviewing officials from 44 communities in 17 states."

In July 2009, Lurie returned to HHS as Assistant Secretary for Preparedness and Response at the Department of Health and Human Services. In that position, Lurie oversaw the federal public health response to various health crises, including Hurricane Sandy and the Boston Marathon bombing. Lurie was also appointed to oversee the federal response to the Flint water crisis.

Dr. Lurie has been a volunteer physician at the Bread for the City clinic in Washington, D.C. since 1998.

== Memberships, awards and honors ==
Lurie was elected to the council of the Society of General Internal Medicine in 1987, and was president of the society from 1997-1998. Lurie is a member of the Institute of Medicine.

Lurie has received a number of awards, including the Association for Health Services Research's Young Investigator Award; the University of Pennsylvania Perelman School of Medicine Distinguished Graduate Award (2009); the American Federation for Medical Research's Nellie Westerman Prize for Research in Ethics; and an American College of Physicians Mastership.

== Personal life ==
Lurie is married to Jesse L. Goodman, a physician and former chief scientist at the Food and Drug Administration.
