= Assistant Secretary of Defense for Nuclear Deterrence, Chemical, and Biological Defense Policy and Programs =

Advisor to the U.S. secretary of defense

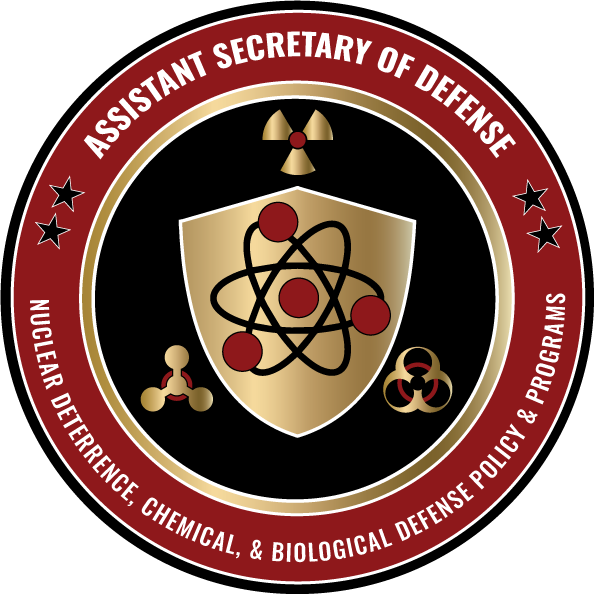
- Emblem of the assistant secretary of defense for nuclear deterrence, chemical, and biological defense policy and programs

- Flag of an assistant secretary of defense

- Incumbent; Robert Kadlec since December 29, 2025
- Office of the Secretary of Defense
- Style: Sir/Madam Assistant Secretary (formal address in writing)
- Reports to: Under Secretary of Defense for Acquisition and Sustainment; Under Secretary of Defense for Policy; Deputy Secretary of Defense; United States Secretary of Defense
- Appointer: The president with the advice and consent of the Senate
- Term length: No fixed term
- Formation: 2009
- Succession: 15th in SecDef succession
- Deputy: The deputy under secretary
- Salary: Level IV of the Executive Schedule
- Website: www.acq.osd.mil/ncbdp

The assistant secretary of defense for nuclear deterrence, chemical, and biological defense policy and programs, or ASD (ND-CBD), is the principal adviser to the secretary of defense, the deputy secretary of defense, and the under secretaries of defense for acquisition and sustainment and policy, on policy and plans for nuclear, chemical, and biological defense programs.

The post has previously held the following names: the assistant to the secretary of defense for atomic energy, or ATSD (AE); the assistant to the secretary of defense for nuclear and chemical and biological defense programs, or ATSD (NCB); and the assistant secretary of defense for nuclear, chemical, and biological defense programs, or ASD (NCB).

The current assistant secretary of defense (nuclear deterrence, chemical, and biological defense policy and programs) is Robert Kadlec.

== Duties ==
The assistant secretary of defense for nuclear deterrence, chemical, and biological defense policy and programs (ASD (ND-CBD)) develops policies, advice, and recommendations on nuclear energy, nuclear weapons, and chemical and biological defense, including:

- nuclear weapons;
- chemical, biological, radiological, and nuclear (CBRN) medical and non-medical defense;
- safety and security of chemical and biological agents;
- safety, surety, security, and safe destruction of the current chemical weapon stockpile;
- nuclear, chemical and biological arms control activities and related plans and programs.

The ASD (ND-CBD) also serves as the DoD's coordinator and funding administrator for nuclear and conventional physical security equipment's research, development, test, and evaluation programs executed by the Military Departments and the Defense Threat Reduction Agency (DTRA).

The ASD (ND-CBD) reports to two different under secretaries of defense, for policy, and for acquisition and sustainment. The ASD (ND-CBD) is a direct report to the principal staff assistants of either office.

The National Defense Authorization Act for FY 2025 was signed in December 2024, redesignating the assistant secretary of defense for nuclear, chemical, and biological defense programs, or ASD (NCB), to the assistant secretary of defense for nuclear deterrence, chemical, and biological defense policy and programs, or ASD (ND-CBD).

Three deputy assistant secretaries of defense (DASD) report to the ASD (ND-CBD):

- the deputy assistant secretary of defense for chemical, biological, radiological, and nuclear defense (DASD (CBRND))
- the deputy assistant secretary of defense for nuclear matters (DASD (NM))
- the deputy assistant secretary of defense for nuclear deterrence and countering weapons of mass destruction policy (DASD (CWMD))

In addition, the director of the Defense Threat Reduction Agency reports directly to the assistant secretary of defense for nuclear, chemical and biological defense programs.

== Subordinates ==
The deputy assistant secretary of defense for chemical, biological, radiological, and nuclear defense, or DASD (CBRND), executes day-to-day management, governance, and resourcing of the Chemical and Biological Defense Program (CDBP) and coordinates with the Executive Agent (EA) for Chemical and Biological Defense (CBD) and other Office of Secretary of Defense components using the procedures and governance framework in DoDI 5160.01.

The deputy assistant secretary of defense for CBRN defense oversees development of chemical, biological, radiological and nuclear (CBRN) defenses to protect national interests at home and abroad, handling Department of Defense efforts related to:

- science and technology,
- advanced development
- test and evaluation of chemical, biological, radiological and nuclear defenses
- the Chemical and Biological Defense Program Objective Memorandum (POM).

The deputy assistant secretary of defense for nuclear matters, or DASD (NM), is the focal point for activities and initiatives related to sustaining a safe, secure, and effective nuclear deterrent and countering threats from nuclear terrorism and nuclear proliferation. This office serves as a primary point of contact for Congress, other agencies, and the public for those programs.

The deputy assistant secretary for nuclear matters fulfills the nuclear weapons roles, responsibilities, and functions for the ASD (ND-CBD). DASD (NM) is the focal point of the Department of Defense for the U.S. nuclear deterrent. In this capacity, DASD (NM) is the primary DoD point of contact for Congress, the interagency, and the public, and for allies and foreign partners on issues related to the U.S. nuclear stockpile and the integration and alignment of U.S. nuclear weapons. To perform these functions, DASD (NM) is composed of representatives from all areas of the nuclear community, including the U.S. Navy, the U.S. Air Force, the National Guard Bureau, the United States Nuclear Command and Control Systems Support Staff, the Defense Threat Reduction Agency, the US Department of Energy, the National Nuclear Security Administration, Los Alamos National Laboratory, Lawrence Livermore National Laboratory, Sandia National Laboratories, the Kansas City Plant, and the National Security Agency.

The deputy assistant secretary of defense for nuclear deterrence and counter weapons of mass destruction policy, or DASD (CWMD), is the principal adviser to the ASD (ND-CBD) for:

- acquisition oversight, implementation, and compliance with nuclear, biological, and chemical treaties;
- cooperative threat reduction; chemical demilitarization programs;
- building global partner capacity to counter weapons of mass destruction.

The DASD (CWMD) exercises oversight of the DTRA-executed Cooperative Threat Reduction (CTR) program and provides oversight of the Chemical Demilitarization Program.

This office also:

- oversees implementation of and compliance with existing and prospective nuclear, biological, and chemical arms control agreements in accordance with DoDD 2060.1;
- integrates programs to combat proliferation of weapons of mass destruction; and
- assists the ASD (ND-CBD) as the executive secretary of the Counterproliferation Program Review Committee (CPRC) and the Chair of the Standing Committee of the CPRC.

== History ==
The ASD (ND-CBD)'s functions can be traced back to the US Department of Defense's Military Liaison Committee (MLC), formed in the early Cold War to coordinate military requirements with the United States Atomic Energy Commission (AEC). The MLC was the channel of communication between the DoD and AEC (later the US Energy Research and Development Administration and the US Department of Energy) on all matters relating to military applications of atomic weapons or atomic energy. It addressed matters of policy, programming, and funding of the military application of atomic energy.

In 1951, the secretary of defense moved the Military Liaison Committee to the Pentagon. Its chairman became the deputy to the secretary of defense for atomic energy matters. In 1953, this position was renamed the assistant to the secretary of defense for atomic energy.

The National Defense Authorization Act for FY 1987 (P.L. 99-661, passed in November 1986) abolished the Military Liaison Committee, replacing it with the Nuclear Weapons Council. Just over a year later, the National Defense Authorization Act for Fiscal Years 1988–1989 (P.L. 100-180) created the position of assistant to the secretary of defense (atomic energy), or ATSD (AE).

In 1994, the ATSD (AE) was given control over the Defense Nuclear Agency (DNA), now the Defense Threat Reduction Agency. Also in 1994, the ATSD (AE) created the position of deputy assistant to the secretary of defense for nuclear matters, or DATSD (NM). In February 1996, the National Defense Authorization Act for Fiscal Year 1996 (P.L. 104-106) replaced the assistant to the secretary of defense (atomic energy) with the assistant to the secretary of defense for nuclear and chemical and biological defense programs, or ASTD (NCB).

The Clinton administration declined to nominate an assistant to the secretary of defense for nuclear and chemical and biological defense programs (ATSD (NCB)) between 1997 and 2001, having determined (as part of its Defense Reform Initiative) that the position should be eliminated. Congress insisted that the Pentagon maintain the office, arguing it was necessary to ensure appropriate senior-level policy oversight and implementation guidance within the Department of Defense.

In January 2011, President Obama signed the National Defense Authorization Act for FY 2011, renaming the ATSD (NCB) to the assistant secretary of defense for nuclear, chemical and biological defense programs, or ASD (NCB).

In December 2024, the ASD (NCB) was redesignated by the National Defense Authorization Act for Fiscal Year 2025 as the ASD for nuclear deterrence, chemical, and biological defense policy and programs, or ASD (ND-CBD). On May 21, 2025, the Deputy Secretary of Defense formally established the office of the ASD (ND-CBD).

Additionally, the deputy assistant secretary of defense for chemical and biological defense, or DASD (CBD), was replaced by the DASD for chemical, biological, radiological, and nuclear defense, or DASD (CBRND). The DASD for threat reduction and arms control, or DASD (TRAC), was replaced by the DASD for nuclear deterrence and countering weapons of mass destruction policy, or DASD (CWMD).

== Organization ==
- Assistant Secretary of Defense (Nuclear Deterrence, Chemical, and Biological Defense Policy and Programs)
- Principal Deputy Assistant Secretary of Defense (Nuclear Deterrence, Chemical, and Biological Defense Policy and Programs)
  - Deputy Assistant Secretary of Defense (Chemical, Biological, Radiological, and Nuclear Defense)
  - Deputy Assistant Secretary of Defense (Nuclear Matters)
  - Deputy Assistant Secretary of Defense (Nuclear Deterrence and Countering Weapons of Mass Destruction Policy)
  - Director, Defense Threat Reduction Agency

== Officeholders ==
The table below includes both the various titles of this post over time, as well as all the holders of those offices.

Assistant secretaries of defense (nuclear deterrence, chemical, and biological defense policy and programs)
Name	Tenure	SecDef(s) served under	President(s) served under
Chairman, Military Liaison Committee
Lt. Gen. Lewis H. Brereton (USA)	July 17, 1947 – March 30, 1948	James V. Forrestal	Harry Truman
Donald F. Carpenter	April 8, 1948 – September 21, 1948	James V. Forrestal	Harry Truman
William Webster	September 22, 1948 – September 30, 1949	Louis A. Johnson	Harry Truman
Robert LeBaron	October 1, 1949 – April 12, 1953	Louis A. Johnson; George C. Marshall, Jr. Robert A. Lovett; Charles E. Wilson	Harry Truman; Dwight Eisenhower
Chairman, Military Liaison Committee/Assistant to the Secretary of Defense (Atomic Energy)
Robert LeBaron	April 13, 1953 – August 1, 1954	Charles E. Wilson	Dwight Eisenhower
Maj. Gen. Herbert B. Loper (USAF)	August 9, 1954 – July 14, 1961	Charles E. Wilson; Neil H. McElroy; Thomas S. Gates; Robert S. McNamara	Dwight Eisenhower; John F. Kennedy
Dr. Gerald W. Johnson	August 11, 1961 – September 15, 1963	Robert S. McNamara	John F. Kennedy
William J. Howard	January 2, 1964 – June 15, 1966	Robert S. McNamara	Lyndon Johnson
Dr. Carl Walske	October 3, 1966 – April 15, 1973	Robert S. McNamara; Clark M. Clifford; Melvin R. Laird; Elliot L. Richardson	Lyndon Johnson; Richard Nixon
Donald R. Cotter	October 16, 1973 – March 17, 1978	James R. Schlesinger; Donald H. Rumsfeld; Harold Brown	Richard Nixon; Gerald Ford; Jimmy Carter
Dr. James P. Wade, Jr.	August 8, 1978 – June 14, 1981; June 15, 1981 – June 5, 1982 (Acting)	Harold Brown; Caspar W. Weinberger	Jimmy Carter; Ronald Reagan
Dr. Richard Wagner	June 6, 1982 – April 1, 1986	Caspar W. Weinberger	Ronald Reagan
Dr. Robert B. Barker	October 18, 1986 – November 14, 1986	Caspar W. Weinberger	Ronald Reagan
Assistant to the Secretary of Defense (Atomic Energy)
Dr. Robert B. Barker	November 14, 1986 – March 3, 1988 (non-statutory); March 4, 1988 – May 29, 1992 (statutory)	Caspar W. Weinberger; Frank C. Carlucci III; William H. Taft IV (Acting); Richard B. Cheney	Ronald Reagan; George H. W. Bush
Dr. John Birely (Acting)	May 29, 1992 – May 6, 1993	Richard B. Cheney; Leslie Aspin, Jr.	George H. W. Bush; William Clinton
Dr. Harold P. Smith, Jr.	June 1, 1993 – March 10, 1996	William J. Perry	William Clinton
Assistant to the Secretary of Defense (Nuclear & Chemical & Biological Defense Programs)
Dr. Harold P. Smith, Jr.	March 11, 1996 – January 31, 1998	William J. Perry; William S. Cohen	William Clinton
Position Vacant	1998–2001	William S. Cohen	William Clinton; George W. Bush
Dr. Dale Klein	November 15, 2001 – June 30, 2006	Donald H. Rumsfeld	George W. Bush
Dr. A. Thomas Hopkins (Acting)	June 30, 2006 – July 8, 2008	Donald H. Rumsfeld; Robert M. Gates	George W. Bush
Fred Celec	July 8, 2008 – May 18, 2009	Robert M. Gates	George W. Bush; Barack Obama
Andrew C. Weber	May 18, 2009 – January 7, 2011	Robert M. Gates	Barack Obama
Assistant Secretary of Defense (Nuclear, Chemical & Biological Defense Programs)
Andrew C. Weber	January 7, 2011 – October 1, 2014	Robert M. Gates; Leon Panetta; Chuck Hagel	Barack Obama
Dr. A Thomas Hopkins (Acting)	October 1, 2014 – November 29, 2017	Chuck Hagel; Ash Carter; Jim Mattis	Barack Obama; Donald Trump
Guy B. Roberts	November 30, 2017 – April 2, 2019	Jim Mattis	Donald Trump
Alan Shaffer (PTDO)	April 2, 2019 – January 20, 2021	Mark Esper	Donald Trump
Dr. Brandi Vann (Acting)	January 20, 2021 – August 4, 2021	Lloyd Austin	Joe Biden
Deborah G. Rosenblum	August 4, 2021 – April 8, 2024	Lloyd Austin	Joe Biden
Dr. Brandi Vann (Acting)	April 8, 2024 – May 21, 2025	Lloyd Austin; Pete Hegseth	Joe Biden; Donald Trump
Assistant Secretary of Defense (Nuclear Deterrence, Chemical & Biological Defense Policy & Programs)
Dr. Brandi Vann (Acting)	May 21, 2025 – May 26, 2025	Pete Hegseth	Donald Trump
Drew Walter (Acting)	May 26, 2025 – December 29, 2025	Pete Hegseth	Donald Trump
Dr. Robert Kadlec	December 29, 2025 – Present	Pete Hegseth	Donald Trump
