= National Biodefense Strategy Act of 2016 =

Proposed congressional bill

- Long title: A bill to amend the Homeland Security Act of 2002 to require the Office of Management and Budget to execute a national biodefense strategy, and for other purposes.
- Announced in: the 114th United States Congress
- Sponsored by: U.S. Ron Johnson (R-WI)
- Number of co-sponsors: 1

Codification
- U.S.C. sections affected: 6 U.S.C. § 311

Legislative history
- Introduced in the Senate as S. 2967 by Ron Johnson (R–WI), Joni Ernst (R–IA) on May 23, 2016; Committee consideration by United States Senate Committee on Homeland Security and Governmental Affairs. Reported favorably with amendments on August 30, 2016.

The National Biodefense Strategy Act of 2016 is a bill introduced in the United States Senate by U.S. Senator Ron Johnson (R-Wisconsin). The bill would amend the Homeland Security Act of 2002 by requiring the government to change its current policy and programs to coordinate and improve biodefense preparedness. Johnson is the current chairman of the Senate Committee on Homeland Security and Governmental Affairs.

The bill was placed on the Senate legislative calendar and is currently awaiting further action.

Johnson wrote the bill in response to the Blue Ribbon Study Panel on Biodefense's findings on the state of US preparedness for biological disaster, either as a result of terrorist activity, inadvertent release of hazardous pathogens or a disease pandemic. In October 2015 the panel found the government's preparation for biodefense lacking in that it was fragmented across a multiplicity of federal agencies, among other problems. The bipartisan panel, with members such as former senators Joe Lieberman (I-Connecticut) and Tom Daschle (D–South Dakota) was organized by the first Secretary of Homeland Security Tom Ridge.

Lieberman and Ridge concluded that biological threats are "…among the most sinister – and potentially catastrophic – our nation faces." They emphasized the need for Congress and the Executive to pay attention to these potential disasters and formulate a plan to defend all Americans.

Johnson's bill currently lingers in the Senate, after being reported favorably by the Senate Committee on Homeland Security and Governmental Affairs.

== Background ==
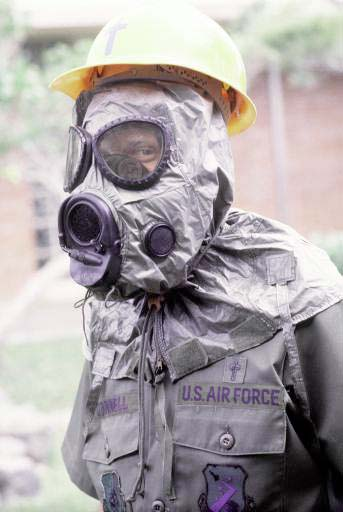
United States Airman wearing an M-17 nuclear, biological, and chemical warfare mask and hood

There are many threats from biological weapons including biological terror attacks against the population. The threat is not limited only to terrorism. Dangerous pathogens can be released accidentally from research laboratories and outbreaks of certain infectious diseases can wreak biological havoc.

Cases of pathogen releases included the breakout of burkholderia pseudomallei bacterium at Tulane University's National Primate Research Center where many of the lab's primates were infected, as well as a visiting scientist from the US Department of Agriculture. Teams of investigators from the Centers for Disease Control and the Department of Agriculture, along with National Institute of Occupational Safety and Health investigated the matter.

The US Army's Dugway Proving Ground in Utah sent live anthrax spores to laboratories in nine states and an army facility in South Korea. Anthrax are very infectious bacteria that infect people by moving through the air. The CDC conducted a thorough investigation and, although no one developed the disease, more than 40 workers at the labs were treated.

Examples of disease outbreaks include major international recent events including the Ebola virus, avian influenza and now the Zika virus.

The National Biodefense Strategy Act had its origins in a panel called the Blue Ribbon Study Panel on Biodefense. The bipartisan panel was led by former U.S. Senator and presidential candidate Joseph Lieberman, appointed by U.S. Secretary of Homeland Security Tom Ridge. In 2015 the panel released a national blueprint for biodefense which included a long list of recommendations on improving the defense against and preparation for responding to a biological incident.

According to panel member and former Senate majority leader Tom Daschle (D-South Dakota) the most important flaw in biodefense was the need for a permanent leadership organization in the White House. During the 2014 Ebola epidemic, the aggregate of government agencies involved demonstrated a coordinated response mechanism is essential. Daschle agreed with the Panel's recommendation that the responsibility for biodefense coordination should be that of the Vice President.

The panel concluded that the US biodefense has become too fragmented with authority spread among too many government agencies. They said Congress could repair these flaws by focusing the command and control of biodefense at the White House and empowering one individual with the responsibility and budgetary authority to coordinate the diverse and numerous communities that manage the nation's biodefense.

After the panel released its blueprint, Johnson began writing the legislation. According to the Senate report accompanying the bill, "The purpose of S. 2967, the National Biodefense Strategy Act of 2016, is to require the President to develop and execute a comprehensive national biodefense strategy. In 2014, several high-ranking Government officials… convened the Blue Ribbon Study Panel on Biodefense to assess the state of our nation's biodefense capabilities and to recommend improvement measures. S. 2967 codifies key recommendations of this panel by requiring a holistic national strategy that aims to direct and harmonize all existing agency-specific strategies with respect to biodefense."

According to Homeland Preparedness News, "Among the report's chief findings was the conclusion that the United States lacks a single federal leader for biodefense, a comprehensive national strategy and a dedicated biodefense budget."

The U.S. government spends approximately $6 billion each year on biodefense-specific activities, but the report highlighted the GAO's finding of a fragmentation of biodefense leadership. The GAO said that there are more than two dozen presidentially appointed individuals with biodefense responsibilities and numerous federal agencies with mission responsibilities for supporting biodefense activities. No individual or entity, however, has responsibility for overseeing the nation's biodefense enterprise.

== Major provisions ==
The objective of the bill is to improve coordination within the federal government in order to prevent and prepare for a biological attack. For example, the legislation would create a Biodefense Coordination Council which would include representatives from key federal government agencies. If legislation was signed into law, the President of the United States would be required to report to Congress on the status of the biodefense strategy every 180 days until that strategy was fully implemented.

The National Biodefense Strategy Act amends the Homeland Security Act of 2002 (the law that created the U.S. Department of Homeland Security one year after the 9/11 attacks) by directing the President of the United States to:

- Create, submit, and regularly update a National Biodefense Strategy in order to direct and align efforts by the federal government toward an effective and continuously improving biodefense system.
- Create a Biodefense Coordination Council which will provide expertise required to develop the strategy to align various government agencies and their activities into a coordinated biodefense effort.
- Report on the total amount of money that federal agencies are spending on bio defense activities annually.

The National Biodefense Strategy would serve as a comprehensive guide for U.S. biodefense programs and would include:

- A detailed description of every entity and leader responsible for implementing, overseeing, and coordinating federal biodefense activities.
- A review of all military and civilian federal government activities regarding biodefense.
- A "detailed analyses of recommendations issued by external biodefense review commissions, lessons learned from the government response to public health emergencies within the preceding five years, major biological incident risks, resources and capabilities needed to address identified risks, resource and capability gaps in the biodefense enterprise, and prioritization and allocation of investment across the biodefense enterprise."

Other provisions can be viewed on the summary page for the legislation at Congress.gov.

== Legislative history ==
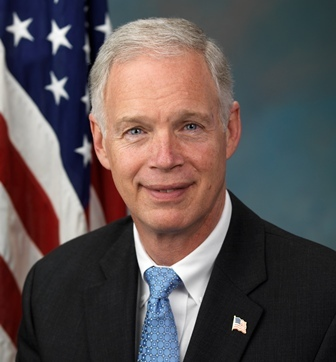
U.S. Senator Ron Johnson, chief sponsor of the National Biodefense Strategy Act of 2016

On May 23, 2016, Senator Johnson introduced the bill along with Senator Joni Ernst (R-Iowa), who was an original co-sponsor.

After introduction:

- 5/25/16 - The Senate Committee on Homeland Security and Governmental Affairs considered the bill and ordered it to be reported out of committee favorably, with some amendments.
- 8/30/16 - The Senate Committee on Homeland Security and Governmental Affairs again reported a separate version of the bill, along with a committee report (Senate Report 114–306).
- 8/30/16 - The bill was placed on the Senate Legislative Calendar number 577.
- 9/20/16 – The bill was attached to the Senate's National Defense Authorization Act for Fiscal Year 2017 by Sen. Ernst.
