= Administration for Strategic Preparedness and Response =

US government agency

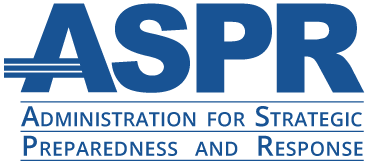

Agency overview
- Formed: December 2006
- Headquarters: Hubert H. Humphrey Building Washington, D.C.
- Agency executive: Vacant, Assistant Secretary for Preparedness and Response
- Parent agency: United States Department of Health and Human Services
- Website: aspr.hhs.gov

The Administration for Strategic Preparedness and Response (ASPR) is an operating agency of the U.S. Public Health Service within the Department of Health and Human Services (HHS) that focuses on preventing, preparing for, and responding to the adverse health effects of public health emergencies and disasters. Its functions include preparedness planning and response; building federal emergency medical operational capabilities; countermeasures research, advance development, and procurement; and grants to strengthen the capabilities of hospitals and health care systems in public health emergencies and medical disasters. The office provides federal support, including medical professionals through ASPR’s National Disaster Medical System, to augment state and local capabilities during an emergency or disaster.

The agency has direct predecessors going at least back to 1955. In 2002, it was promoted to be a staff office headed by an Assistant Secretary, and in 2006 it was expanded and renamed the Office of the Assistant Secretary for Preparedness and Response in the wake of Hurricane Katrina. In July 2022, it was announced that the agency was being elevated from a staff office to an operating division, and renamed the Administration for Strategic Preparedness and Response.

As part of the announced 2025 HHS reorganization, ASPR is planned to be absorbed into the Centers for Disease Control and Prevention.

== Authority ==
Under the Pandemic and All Hazards Preparedness Act of 2006 (PAHPA) (Pub. L. 109–417 (text) (PDF)), HHS is the lead agency for the National Response Framework (NRF) for Emergency Support Function 8 (ESF-8). The secretary of HHS delegates to ASPR the leadership role for all health and medical services support functions in a health emergency or public health event. To meet the public information requirements of PAHPA the Public Health Emergency.gov web portal was created to serve as a single point of access to public health risk, and situational awareness information when the president or the secretary of health and human services exercise their public health emergency legal authority.

The Pandemic and All-Hazards Preparedness Reauthorization Act of 2013 (Pub. L. 113–5 (text) (PDF)) improved and reauthorized the provisions of the PAHPA. The primary portion of the bill dealing with this office is Section 102. Among other things, the bill requires the assistant secretary for preparedness and response, with respect to overseeing advanced research, development, and procurement of qualified countermeasures, security countermeasures, and qualified pandemic or epidemic products, to:

(1) identify and minimize gaps, duplication and other inefficiencies in medical and public health preparedness and response activities and the actions necessary to overcome these obstacles;
(2) align and coordinate medical and public health grants and cooperative agreements as applicable to preparedness and response activities authorized under the Public Health Service Act;
(3) carry out drills and operational exercises to identify, inform, and address gaps in and policies related to all-hazards medical and public health preparedness; and
(4) conduct periodic meetings with the Assistant to the President for National Security Affairs to provide an update on, and to discuss, medical and public health preparedness and response activities.

== Divisions ==
As of 2023, ASPR has eight program offices (headed by a deputy assistant secretary):

- Immediate Office of the Administration for Strategic Preparedness and Response
  - Office of the Principal Deputy Assistant Secretary for Strategic Preparedness and Response
  - Office of Strategy, Policy, and Requirements (headed by a Deputy Assistant Secretary)

Office of

- Administration
- Biomedical Advanced Research and Development Authority (BARDA)
- HHS Coordination Operations and Response Element (H-CORE)
- Industrial Base Management and Supply Chain
- Preparedness
- Response
- Strategic National Stockpile (SNS)

== Activities ==
ASPR is the secretary's principal advisor on matters related to bioterrorism and other public health emergencies. They are responsible for coordinating interagency activities between HHS, other Federal departments, agencies, offices and State and local officials responsible for emergency preparedness and the protection of the civilian population from acts of bioterrorism and other public health emergencies. ASPR also works closely with global partners to address common threats around the world, enhancing national capacities to detect and respond to such threats, and to learn from each other’s experiences as another step toward national health security for the United States and other countries.

The United States National Response Framework (NRF) is part of the National Strategy for Homeland Security that presents the guiding principles enabling all levels of domestic response partners to prepare for and provide a unified national response to disasters and emergencies. Building on the existing National Incident Management System (NIMS) as well as Incident Command System (ICS) standardization, the NRF's coordinating structures are always in effect for implementation at any level and at any time for local, state, and national emergency or disaster response.

=== Public Health Emergency Medical Countermeasures Enterprise ===
The Public Health Emergency Medical Countermeasures Enterprise (PHEMCE) is an interagency coordinating body led by ASPR. It coordinates the development, acquisition, stockpiling, and recommendations for using medical countermeasures to deal with public health emergencies. Along with Biomedical Advanced Research and Development Authority (BARDA), it includes internal HHS partners at the Food and Drug Administration (FDA), the National Institutes of Health (NIH), and the Centers for Disease Control and Prevention (CDC), along with external inter-agency partners at the Department of Defense (DoD), the United States Department of Homeland Security (DHS), the United States Department of Agriculture (USDA), and the United States Department of Veterans Affairs (VA).

=== Manhattan Project for Biodefense ===
In July 2019, the Blue Ribbon Study Panel on Biodefense announced a new idea to improve U.S. national security against bioterrorism: a "Manhattan Project for Biodefense." The idea is a "proposed national, public-private research and development undertaking that would defend the United States against biological threats" and is publicly supported by retired U.S. Senator Joseph Lieberman, the co-chair of the panel, and Robert Kadlec, former U.S. Assistant Secretary for Preparedness and Response. Kadlec remarked, “We highly endorse such an endeavor in the sense of it’s time to say, ‘Go big or go home’ on this issue."

== History ==
ASPR has direct predecessors going back to at least 1955, when it was the Office of Defense Coordination under the Assistant Secretary for Federal–State Relations. It was the subject of the first delegation order issued by the Federal Civil Defense Administration, a predecessor of the Federal Emergency Management Agency. In 1975, it became the Division of Emergency Coordination within the Office of the Assistant Secretary for Administration and Management. In 1984, it became the Office of Emergency Preparedness within the Office of the Assistant Secretary for Health.

In 2002, as a result of the Public Health Security and Bioterrorism Preparedness and Response Act of 2002, it became the Office of Public Health Emergency Preparedness (OPHEP), and was elevated to be headed by an Assistant Secretary. It also absorbed the recently created Office of Public Health Preparedness from the Immediate Office of the Secretary, which became the Office of BioDefense. Its scope of activity included preparedness for bioterrorism, chemical and nuclear attack, mass evacuation and decontamination.

The first head of OPHEP was Donald Henderson, credited with having previously eradicated Smallpox. Soon Jerry Hauer, a veteran public health expert, took over as director, with Henderson taking a different role in the department. Hauer was removed from the job primarily for conflicts he had with Scooter Libby over whether the risks of smallpox vaccination were worth the benefit. Hauer charged that the Office of the Vice President was pushing for the universal vaccination despite the vaccine's health risks, primarily exaggerate the risk of biological terrorism.

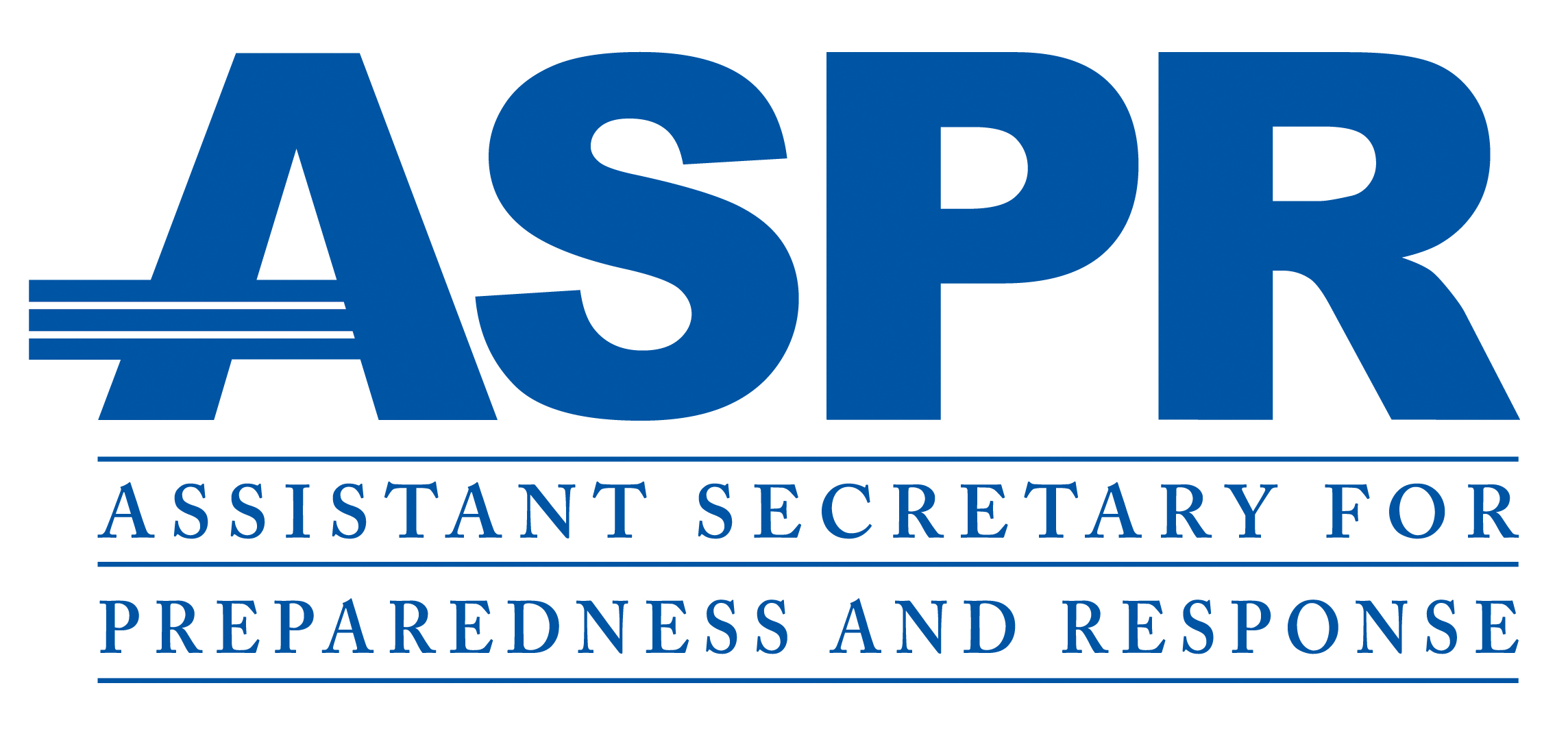
ASPR logo prior to July 2022

In July 2006, the Pandemic and All Hazards Preparedness Act of 2006, a bill to amend the Public Health Service Act with respect to public health security and all-hazards preparedness and response was introduced. On December 19, 2006 it became public law and OPHEP was officially changed to the Office of the Assistant Secretary for Preparedness and Response.

In July 2022, it was announced that the agency was being elevated from a staff office to an operating division, and renamed the Administration for Strategic Preparedness and Response.

=== Directors (assistant secretaries and acting) ===
Office of Public Health Emergency Preparedness

- Donald Henderson (2002)
- Jerry Hauer (acting, 2002–2004)
- Stewart Simonson (Assistant Secretary) (2004-2006)

(Office of the) Assistant Secretary for Preparedness and Response

- W. Craig Vanderwagen (2006–2009)
- Nicole Lurie (2009–2017)
- George Korch (acting, 2017)
- Robert Kadlec (2017–2021)
- Nikki Bratcher-Bowman (acting, 2021)
- Dawn O'Connell (2021–2025)

== See also ==
- Advanced Research Projects Agency for Health (ARPA-H)
- Emergency Care Coordination Center
- Strategic National Stockpile (SNS)
