= United States Department of Health and Human Services =

Department of the U.S. federal government

- Seal of the US Department of Health and Human Services

- Flag of the US Department of Health and Human Services

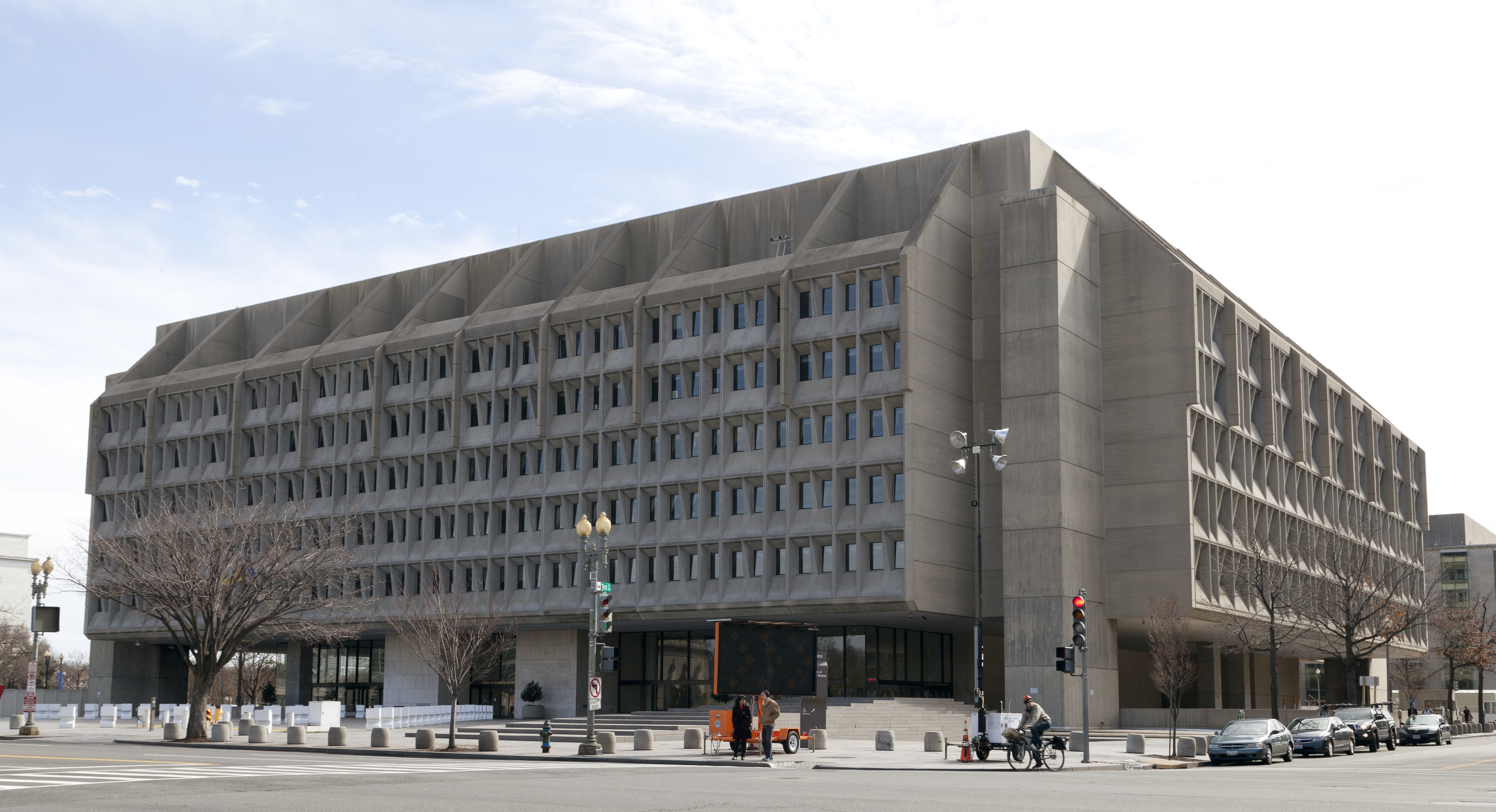
- Hubert H. Humphrey Building, Department headquarters

Department overview
- Formed: April 11, 1953 (as the Department of Health, Education, and Welfare)
- Preceding agencies: Federal Security Agency; United States Department of Health, Education, and Welfare
- Jurisdiction: Federal government of the United States
- Headquarters: Hubert H. Humphrey Building Washington, D.C.
- Motto: Make America Healthy Again
- Employees: 80,000
- Annual budget: $1.631 trillion (2022)
- Secretary responsible: Robert F. Kennedy Jr.
- Deputy Secretary responsible: Vacant
- Department executive: Matt Buckham, Chief of Staff
- Website: hhs.gov

The United States Department of Health and Human Services (HHS) is a cabinet-level executive branch department of the U.S. federal government created to set guidelines for the private healthcare system and provide essential human services in areas such as funding medical studies. Before the separate federal Department of Education was created in 1979, it was called the Department of Health, Education, and Welfare (HEW). HHS is administered by the secretary of health and human services, who is appointed by the president with the advice and consent of the United States Senate. The United States Public Health Service Commissioned Corps, the uniformed service of the U.S. Public Health Service, is led by the surgeon general who is responsible for addressing matters concerning public health as authorized by the secretary or by the assistant secretary for health in addition to their primary mission of administering the Commissioned Corps.

== History ==
=== Federal Security Agency ===
The Federal Security Agency (FSA) was established on July 1, 1939, under the Reorganization Act of 1939, P.L. 76–19. The objective was to bring together in one agency all federal programs in the fields of health, education, and social security. The first Federal Security Administrator was Paul V. McNutt. The new agency originally consisted of the following major components: (1) Office of the Administrator, (2) Public Health Service (PHS), (3) Office of Education, (4) Civilian Conservation Corps, and (5) Social Security Board.

=== Department of Health, Education, and Welfare ===
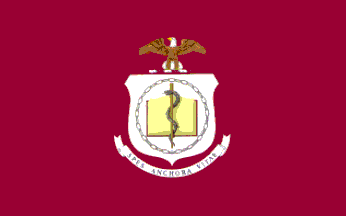
The seal and flag of the US Department of Health, Education, and Welfare until 1979

The Department of Health, Education, and Welfare (HEW) was created on April 11, 1953, when Reorganization Plan No. 1 of 1953 became effective. HEW thus became the first new Cabinet-level department since the Department of Labor was created in 1913. The Reorganization Plan abolished the FSA and transferred all of its functions to the secretary of HEW and all components of the agency to the department. The first secretary of HEW was Oveta Culp Hobby, a native of Texas, who had served as commander of the Women's Army Corps in World War II and was editor and publisher of the Houston Post. Sworn in on April 11, 1953, as secretary, she was FSA administrator from January 21, 1953 until July 1955, stepping down to take care of her ill husband.

The six major program-operating components of the new department were the Public Health Service, the Office of Education, the Food and Drug Administration, the Social Security Administration, the Office of Vocational Rehabilitation, and St. Elizabeth's Hospital. The department was also responsible for three federally aided corporations: Howard University, the American Printing House for the Blind, and the Columbia Institution for the Deaf (Gallaudet College since 1954).

=== Department of Health and Human Services ===
The Department of Health, Education, and Welfare was renamed the Department of Health and Human Services (HHS) on October 17, 1979, when its education functions were transferred to the newly created United States Department of Education under the Department of Education Organization Act. HHS was left in charge of the Social Security Administration, agencies constituting the Public Health Service, and Family Support Administration.

In 1995, the Social Security Administration was removed from the Department of Health and Human Services, and established as an independent agency of the executive branch of the United States government.

The 2010 United States federal budget established a reserve fund of more than $630 billion over 10 years to finance fundamental reform of the health care system.

In February 2025 it was reported that DHHS planned to "eliminate public participation in many of the agency's policy decisions." As part of the announced 2025 HHS reorganization, a reduction in workforce totaling about 20,000 full-time employees was expected to reduce its workforce by 20%.

== Organization ==
The Department of Health and Human Services is led by the United States secretary of health and human services, a member of the United States Cabinet appointed by the president of the United States with the consent of the United States Senate. The secretary is assisted in managing the department by the deputy secretary of health and human services, who is also appointed by the president. The secretary and deputy secretary are further assisted by seven assistant secretaries, who serve as top departmental administrators.

The following organizational structure is current as of the beginning of 2025. It is planned to be significantly changed by the announced 2025 HHS reorganization, which is planned to reduce the number of top-level HHS divisions from 28 to 15.

=== U.S. Public Health Service ===
Within HHS is a collection of agencies and offices that fall under the Public Health Service. The PHS also is home to the Public Health Service Commissioned Corps (PHSCC). The operating agencies that are part of PHS are:

- National Institutes of Health (NIH)
- Centers for Disease Control and Prevention (CDC)
- Indian Health Service (IHS)
- Food and Drug Administration (FDA)
- Agency for Toxic Substances and Disease Registry (ATSDR)
- Health Resources and Services Administration (HRSA)
- Agency for Healthcare Research and Quality (AHRQ)
- Substance Abuse and Mental Health Services Administration (SAMHSA)
- Administration for Strategic Preparedness and Response (ASPR)
- Advanced Research Projects Agency for Health (ARPA-H)
- Office of the Assistant Secretary for Health (OASH)
  - Office of the Surgeon General
- Office of Global Affairs

==== Office of Global Affairs ====
The Office of Global Affairs (OGA), formally the Secretary's Office of Global Affairs, serves as the department's primary diplomatic voice and lead for global health matters. The office provides leadership and expertise in global health diplomacy, the intersection of public health and foreign affairs, to advance U.S. priorities, foster international partnerships, coordinate global health policy and initiatives across HHS and the broader U.S. government, and contribute to a safer, healthier world while protecting Americans at home and abroad. OGA advances the President's agenda through transparent and common-sense approaches to global partnerships, strengthens the U.S. position as the global standard for public health, and coordinates international engagement with foreign governments, multilateral organizations, and other stakeholders.

OGA coordinates HHS's international activities, including policy development, partnerships, and engagement on issues like pandemic preparedness, health security, and global health threats. It leads on global health diplomacy, supports U.S. positions in international forums, and ensures that international efforts enhance domestic health preparedness and systems. The office has regional components (e.g., offices for Africa & Middle East, The Americas, Asia & the Pacific, Europe & Eurasia) and handles multilateral relations. In relation to the International Health Regulations (IHR) and other frameworks, OGA contributes to U.S. government approaches on global health security and communications with bodies like the World Health Organization (WHO), often in coordination with components such as the Administration for Strategic Preparedness and Response (ASPR).

The current head of OGA is Bethany Kozma, Director of the Secretary's Office for Global Affairs. Earlier leadership included Loyce Pace, who served as Assistant Secretary for Global Affairs starting in March 2021 under the Biden administration.

=== Human Services agencies ===
This list includes the HHS operating agencies that do not fall under PHS:

- Administration for Children and Families (ACF)
- Administration for Community Living (ACL)
- Centers for Medicare & Medicaid Services (CMS) – formerly the Health Care Financing Administration.

=== Other staff offices ===
The HHS staff offices outside of PHS are:

- Immediate Office of the Secretary
- Office of Intergovernmental and External Affairs
  - Center for Faith-based and Neighborhood Partnerships
  - Regional offices (shown below)
- Office of the Assistant Secretary for Administration
  - Federal Occupational Health
- Office of the Assistant Secretary for Financial Resources
- Office of the Assistant Secretary for Legislation
- Office of the Assistant Secretary for Planning and Evaluation
- Office of the Assistant Secretary for Public Affairs
- Office for Civil Rights
- Departmental Appeals Board
- Office of the General Counsel
- Office of Inspector General
- Office of Medicare Hearings and Appeals
- Office of the National Coordinator for Health Information Technology
- Chief Information Officer

HHS IEA Regional Offices
| Region | Regional Director | Subordinated States |
|---|---|---|
| Region 1 | Paul Jacobsen | Connecticut, Maine, Massachusetts, New Hampshire, Rhode Island, and Vermont |
| Region 2 | Dennis González | New Jersey, New York, Puerto Rico, and the Virgin Islands |
| Region 3 | Dalton Paxtan | Delaware, District of Columbia, Maryland, Pennsylvania, Virginia, and West Virginia |
| Region 4 | Thomas Bowman | Alabama, Florida, Georgia, Kentucky, Mississippi, North Carolina, South Carolina, and Tennessee |
| Region 5 | Joshua Devine | Illinois, Indiana, Michigan, Minnesota, Ohio, and Wisconsin |
| Region 6 | Julia Lothrop | Arkansas, Louisiana, New Mexico, Oklahoma, and Texas |
| Region 7 | Scott Conner | Iowa, Kansas, Missouri, and Nebraska |
| Region 8 | Elsa Ramirez | Colorado, Montana, North Dakota, South Dakota, Utah, and Wyoming |
| Region 9 | Bonnie Preston | Arizona, California, Hawaii, Nevada, American Samoa, Commonwealth of the Northern Mariana Islands, Federated States of Micronesia, Guam, Marshall Islands, and Republic of Palau |
| Region 10 | Renée Bouvion | Alaska, Idaho, Oregon, and Washington |

=== Former operating divisions and agencies ===
- Environmental Health Divisions, made independent as Environmental Protection Agency in 1970
- Office of Education, made independent as U.S. Department of Education in 1980
- Social Security Administration, made independent in 1995

== Budget and finances ==
The Department of Health and Human Services was authorized a budget for fiscal year 2020 of $1.293 trillion. The budget authorization is broken down as follows:

| Program | Budget authority (in millions) |
|---|---|
| Food and Drug Administration | $3,329 |
| Health Resources and Services Administration | $11,004 |
| Indian Health Service | $6,104 |
| Centers for Disease Control and Prevention | $6,767 |
| National Institutes of Health | $33,669 |
| Substance Abuse and Mental Health Services Administration | $5,535 |
| Agency for Healthcare Research and Quality | $0 |
| Centers for Medicare & Medicaid Services | $1,169,091 |
| Administration for Children and Families | $52,121 |
| Administration for Community Living | $1,997 |
| Departmental Management | $340 |
| Non-Recurring Expense Fund | $-400 |
| Office of Medicare Hearings and Appeals | $186 |
| Office of the National Coordinator | $43 |
| Office for Civil Rights | $30 |
| Office of Inspector General | $82 |
| Public Health and Social Services Emergency Fund | $2,667 |
| Program Support Center | $749 |
| Offsetting Collections | $-629 |
| Other Collections | $-163 |
| TOTAL | $1,292,523 |

The FY2020 budget included a $1.276 billion budget decrease for the Centers for Disease Control and Prevention and a $4.533 billion budget decrease for the National Institutes of Health. These budget cuts, along with other changes since 2019, comprised a total decrease of over $24 billion in revised discretionary budget authority across the entire Department of Health and Human Services for Fiscal Year 2020.

Additional details of the budgeted outlays, budget authority, and detailed budgets for other years, can be found at the HHS Budget website.

== Programs ==
The Department of Health and Human Services administers 115 programs across its 11 operating divisions. The United States Department of Health and Human Services (HHS) aims to "protect the health of all Americans and provide essential human services, especially for those who are least able to help themselves." These federal programs consist of social service programs, civil rights and healthcare privacy programs, disaster preparedness programs, and health-related research. HHS offers a variety of social service programs geared toward persons with low income, disabilities, military families, and senior citizens. Healthcare rights are defined under HHS in the Health Insurance Portability and Accountability Act (HIPAA) which protect patient's privacy in regards to medical information, protects workers health insurance when unemployed, and sets guidelines surrounding some health insurance. HHS collaborates with the Office of the Assistant Secretary for Preparedness and Response and Office of Emergency Management to prepare and respond to health emergencies. A broad array of health-related research is supported or completed under the HHS; secondarily under HHS, the Health Resources & Service Administration houses data warehouses and makes health data available surrounding a multitude of topics. HHS also has vast offering of health-related resources and tools to help educate the public on health policies and pertinent population health information. Some examples of available resources include disease prevention, wellness, health insurance information, as well as links to healthcare providers and facilities, meaningful health-related materials, public health, and safety information.

Some highlights include:

- AI in health and social science research
- Preventing disease, including immunization services
- ARPA-H
- Assuring food and drug safety
- Medicare (health insurance for elderly and disabled Americans) and Medicaid (health insurance for low-income people)
- Health information technology
- Financial assistance and services for low-income families
- Improving maternal and infant health, including a Nurse Home Visitation to support first-time mothers
- Head Start (pre-school education and services)
- Faith-based and community initiatives
- Preventing child abuse and domestic violence
- Substance abuse treatment and prevention
- Services for older Americans, including home-delivered meals
- Comprehensive health services for Native Americans
- Assets for Independence
- Medical preparedness for emergencies, including potential terrorism
- Child support enforcement

=== The Health Insurance Portability and Accountability Act (HIPAA) ===
This program is to ensure the accountability of medical professionals to respect and carry out basic human health rights, under the act of the same name. In the United States, the government feels that it is essential for the American people to understand their civil duty and rights to all of their medical information. That includes health insurance policies or medical records from every doctor or emergency visit in one's life. Through Health & Human Services one can file a complaint that their HIPAA rights have been violated or a consultant will be able to decide if their rights were violated.

=== Social Services ===
This branch has everything to do with the social justice, wellness, and care of all people throughout the United States. This includes but is not limited to people who need government assistance, foster care, unaccompanied alien children, daycares (headstart included), adoption, senior citizens, and disability programs. Social services is one of (if not) the largest branch of programs underneath it that has a wide variety throughout the United States at a state and local level.

=== Prevention and Wellness ===
The prevention and wellness program's main idea is to give the American people the ability to live the healthiest and best lifestyle physically that they can. They handle vaccines and immunizations, which fight from common diseases to deadly ones. The nutrition and fitness programs are intended to be the basics of healthy eating and regular exercise. Health screenings and family health history are crucial in the knowledge of each individual's health and body. Lastly, they help with environmental health where people are researching and studying how environments, both physical and metaphorical, have short- and long-term effects on health and wellness.

=== Strengthening Communities Fund ===
In June 2010, the Department of Health and Human Services created the Strengthening Communities Fund as part of the American Recovery and Reinvestment Act. The fund was appropriated $50 million to be given as grants to organizations in the United States that were engaged in Capacity Building programs. The grants were given to two different types of capacity builders:

- State, Local, and Tribal governments engaged in capacity building: grants will go to state local, and tribal governments to equip them with the capacity to more effectively partner with faith-based or non-faith-based non-profit organizations. Capacity building in this program will involve education and outreach that catalyzes more involvement of non-profit organizations in economic recovery and building up non-profit organization's abilities to tackle economic problems. State, Local, and Tribal governments can receive up to $250,000 in two-year grants
- Non-profit Social Service Providers engaged in capacity building: they will make grants available to non-profit organizations that can assist other non-profit organizations in organizational development, program development, leadership, and evaluations. Non-profits can receive up to $1 million in two-year grants

=== Biodefense ===
HHS plays a role in protecting the United States against bioterrorism events. In 2018, HHS released a new National Biodefense Strategy required by the passage of the 2016 Biodefense Strategy Act. The Biodefense Strategy required the implementation of a biodefense strategy after a 2015 Blue Ribbon Study Panel on Biodefense report found that the 2009 National Strategy for Countering Biological Threats was inadequate in protecting the U.S. The strategy adopted these five central recommendations: creating a single centralized approach to biodefense; implementing an interdisciplinary approach to biodefense that brings together policymakers, scientists, health experts, and academics; drawing up a comprehensive strategy to address human, plant, and animal health; creating a defense against global and domestic biological threats; and creating a proactive policy to combat the misuse and abuse of advanced biotechnology.

HHS also runs the Biodefense Steering Committee, which works with other federal agencies including the U.S. Department of State, U.S. Department of Defense, U.S. Food and Drug Administration, U.S. Department of Homeland Security (DHS), and the Environmental Protection Agency. HHS specifically oversees Project BioShield, established in 2003 and operating since 2004, and its development and production of vaccines.

== Criticisms and controversies ==
In 2016, a published US Senate report revealed that several dozen unaccompanied children from Central America, some as young as 14 years old, were released from custody to traffickers where they were sexually assaulted, starved, or forced to work for little or no pay. The HHS sub agency Office of Refugee Resettlement (ORR) released approximately 90,000 unaccompanied children during 2013–2015 but did not track their whereabouts or properly screen families accepting these children.

To prevent similar episodes, the Homeland Security and Health & Human Services Departments signed a memorandum of understanding in 2016 and agreed to establish joint procedures within one year for dealing with unaccompanied migrant children. As of 2018, they have failed to do so. Between October and December 2017, officials from ORR tried to contact 7,635 children and their sponsors. From these calls, officials learned that 6,075 children remained with their sponsors. Twenty-eight had run away, five had been removed from the United States and fifty-two had relocated to live with a nonsponsor. However, officials have lost track of 1,475 children. ORR claims it is not legally liable for the safety and status of the children once released from custody.

HHS is evidenced to be actively coercing and forcing substances such as antipsychotics on migrating children without consent, and under questionable medical supervision. Medical professionals state that wrongly prescribed antipsychotics are especially dangerous for children, and can cause permanent psychological damage. Medical professionals also state DHS and HHS incarceration and separation policies are likewise causing irreparable mental harm to the children.

Children are also dying in HHS custody. The forced drugging, deaths, and disappearances of migrating Mexican and Central American children might be related to DHS falsely labeling them and their families as 'terror threats' before HHS manages their incarcerations. Despite a federal court order, the DHS separation practices started by Obama and mandated by the Trump administration's "zero-tolerance" policy have not been halted, and HHS has not stopped forcing drugs on the children it incarcerates.

In August 2022, the Office of the Inspector General for Health and Human Services reported that NIH had failed in its oversight of clinical trials, with slightly over half of sample trial results either being tardy for publication or remaining unpublished on ClinicalTrials.gov after several years from the stated completion dates.

=== Freedom of Information Act processing performance ===
In the latest Center for Effective Government analysis of 15 federal agencies which receive the most Freedom of Information Act (FOIA) requests published in 2015 (using 2012 and 2013 data, the most recent years available), the DHHS ranked second to last, earning an F by scoring 57 out of a possible 100 points, largely due to a low score on its particular disclosure rules. It had deteriorated from a D− in 2013.

== Related legislation ==
- 1946: Hospital Survey and Construction Act (Hill-Burton Act) PL 79-725
- 1949: Hospital Construction Act PL 81-380
- 1950: Public Health Services Act Amendments PL 81-692
- 1955: Poliomyelitis Vaccination Assistance Act PL 84-377
- 1956: Health Research Facilities Act PL 84-835
- 1960: Social Security Amendments (Kerr-Mill aid) PL 86-778
- 1961: Community Health Services and Facilities Act PL 87-395
- 1962: Public Health Service Act PL 87-838
- 1962: Vaccination Assistance PL 87-868
- 1963: Mental Retardation Facilities Construction Act/Community Mental Health Centers Act PL 88-164
- 1964: Nurse Training Act PL 88-581
- 1965: Community Health Services and Facilities Act PL 89-109
- 1965: Medicare section of the Social Security Act PL 89-97
- 1965: Mental Health Centers Act Amendments PL 89-105
- 1965: Heart Disease, Cancer, and Stroke Amendments PL 89-239
- 1966: Comprehensive Health Planning and Service Act PL 89-749
- 1970: Community Mental Health Service Act PL 91-211
- 1970: Family Planning Services and Population Research Act PL 91-572
- 1970: Lead-Based Paint Poisoning Prevention Act PL 91-695
- 1971: National Cancer Act PL 92-218
- 1974: Research on Aging Act PL 93-296
- 1974: National Health Planning and Resources Development Act PL 93-641
- 1979: Department of Education Organization Act (removed education functions) PL 96-88
- 1987: Department of Transportation Appropriations Act PL 100-202
- 1988: Medicare Catastrophic Coverage Act PL 100-360
- 1989: Department of Transportation and Related Agencies Appropriations Act PL 101-164
- 1996: Health Insurance Portability and Accountability Act PL 104-191
- 2000: Child Abuse Reform and Enforcement Act PL 106-177
- 2010: Patient Protection and Affordable Care Act PL 111-148
- 2016: 21st Century Cures Act PL 114-255
- 2020: Coronavirus Preparedness and Response Supplemental Appropriations Act PL 116-123
- 2020: Families First Coronavirus Response Act PL 116-127
- 2020: Coronavirus Aid, Relief, and Economic Security Act PL 116-136
- 2020: Paycheck Protection Program and Health Care Enhancement Act PL 116-139
- 2021: Consolidated Appropriations Act PL 116-260
- 2021: American Rescue Plan Act PL 117-2
- 2022: Consolidated Appropriations Act PL 117-103
- 2022: Inflation Reduction Act PL 117-169

== See also ==
- American Recovery and Reinvestment Act (ARRA)
- Early Head Start
- Emergency Care Coordination Center
- Global Health Security Initiative
- Head Start
- Health departments in the United States
- Health information technology
- Health professional
- Healthy People program
- History of public health in the United States
- Human experimentation in the United States
- Rural health
- Supporting Healthy Marriage Project
- Temporary EHR Certification Program
