= Debra Katz =

American civil rights and employment lawyer

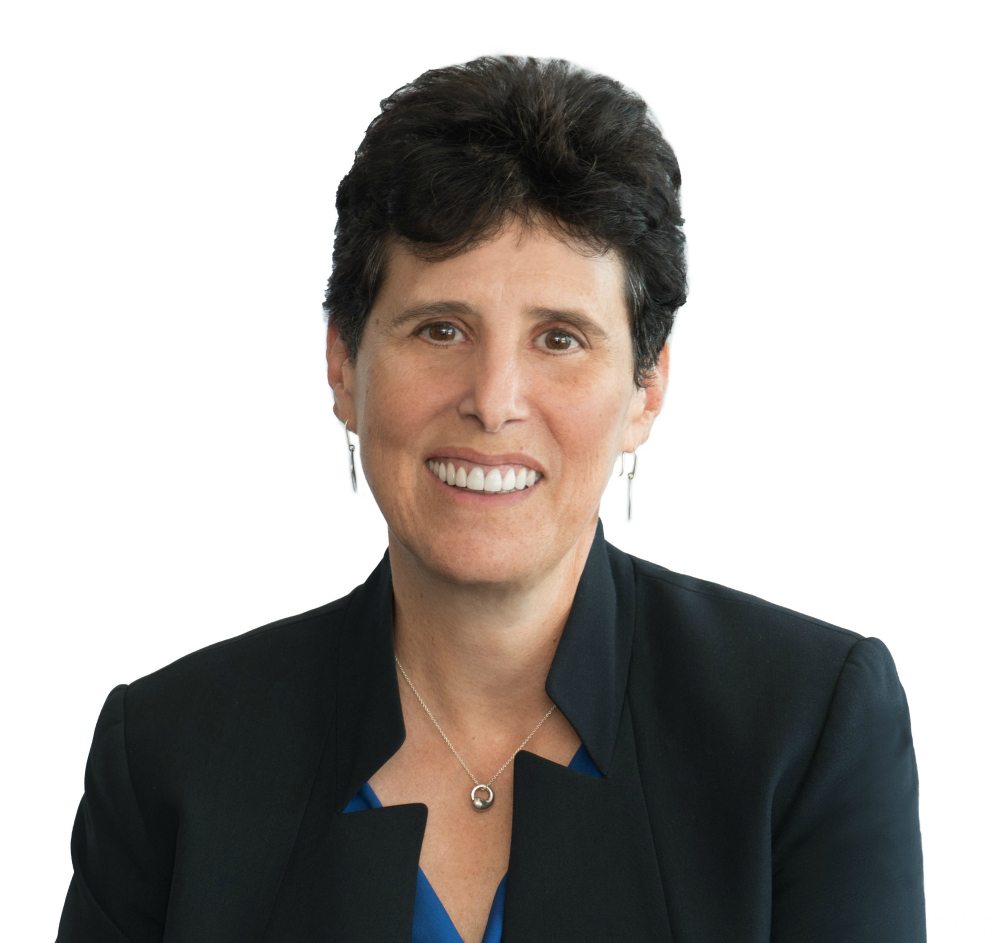
- Debra S. Katz
- Born: October 26, 1958 (age 68); Woodmere, New York, U.S.
- Education: Union College, New York (BA); University of Wisconsin, Madison (JD)
- Occupation: Attorney
- Known for: Founding partner of Katz Banks Kumin (formerly Katz, Marshall & Banks)
- Spouse: Nicole Berner
- Children: 1
- Website: www.katzbanks.com

Debra S. Katz is an American civil rights and employment lawyer and a founding partner of Katz Banks Kumin (formerly Katz, Marshall & Banks) in Washington, D.C. She is best known for representing alleged victims of sexual assault and sexual harassment, notably Christine Blasey Ford, Charlotte Bennett, Vanessa Tyson, Chloe Caras, and accusers of Congressmen Pat Meehan and Eric Massa. She also represented whistleblowers facing retaliation, including Irwin Reiter, a Weinstein Company executive who was an early whistleblower in the Harvey Weinstein sexual abuse cases, Dr. Jeanne Marrazzo, and Dr. Rick Bright. Katz's primary practice areas at her firm are employment and whistleblower law, where she represents victims of workplace discrimination and retaliation.

== Early life and education ==
Katz was raised in Woodmere, New York as a Reform Jew. and graduated from George W. Hewlett High School. In 1980, she received a Bachelor of Arts degree (summa cum laude, Phi Beta Kappa) from Union College and in 1984, a J.D. cum laude from the University of Wisconsin Law School where she was a member of the Wisconsin Law Review and as Articles Editor of the Wisconsin Women's Law Journal. She ultimately left the Wisconsin Law Review and founded the Wisconsin Women's Law Journal because she believed the former lacked racial diversity.

In her first year of law school, she began to glimpse how sexism played a role in the legal profession when she noticed that her class discussions were predominately led by men. Upon confronting one of her professors about this issue, he immediately denied it and then later apologized to the class after noticing the behavior to be true.

== Career ==
After law school, Katz clerked for Judge William A. Bablitch on the Wisconsin Supreme Court and held a Women's Law and Public Policy Fellowship at Georgetown University Law Center.

== Notable clients ==
=== Christine Blasey Ford ===
Debra Katz and Lisa J. Banks represented Christine Blasey Ford, professor at Palo Alto University, who in September 2018 alleged that U.S. Supreme Court nominee Brett Kavanaugh sexually assaulted her in the early 1980s, when they were both teenagers. Dr. Ford later testified before the Senate Judiciary Committee.

=== National Institutes of Health leadership ===
Debra Katz represents Jeanne Marrazzo, the former director of the National Institute of Allergy and Infectious Diseases, in a lawsuit filed against the agency alleging that she was fired after raising concerns about internal clashes over vaccine research with NIH leadership and objecting to the allegedly illegal cancellation of public health studies. Marrazzo originally publicized these concerns in conjunction with Kathleen Neuzil, the former the Director of the John E. Fogarty International Center. Marrazzo was informed she was fired by the agency following her whistleblower disclosure.

=== Charlotte Bennett ===
Katz represented Charlotte Bennett, an aide to former New York Governor Andrew Cuomo who accused him of sexually harassing her in June 2020. Ms. Bennett originally reported her allegations to Jill DesRosiers and Judith Mogul, Cuomo's chief of staff and special counsel. They did not forward her complaint to the Governor's Office of Employee Relations, which would have launched an independent investigation into the allegations.

After a five-month long investigation, the New York Attorney General Letitia James released a report finding that Governor Cuomo engaged in sexual harassment against at least 11 women in his circle, including Ms. Bennett, and retaliated against those who came forward. One week after the results of the investigation were released, Governor Cuomo announced his resignation. In 2024, the U.S. Department of Justice announced a settlement with the State of New York Executive Chamber to resolve federal claims Cuomo engaged in a pattern or practice of sexual harassment and retaliation.

=== Irwin Reiter ===
Katz is representing Irwin Reiter, a longtime Weinstein Company executive, who reportedly objected to Harvey Weinstein's alleged sexual harassment of a front desk assistant and Weinstein's sexually predatory behavior. Reiter was instrumental in providing New York Times reporters Jodi Kantor and Megan Twohey with information about Weinstein's misconduct that proved critical to their reporting. Reiter has been identified by Kantor and Twohey, who won the Pulitzer Prize for their reporting, as the key whistleblower.

=== Dawn Dunning ===
Debra Katz represented Dawn Dunning, who testified against Harvey Weinstein during his criminal trial in February 2020.

Dunning, a former aspiring actress, testified that after she met Weinstein in the early 2000s, they formed a relationship she believed would help her career. However, during business meetings, Weinstein propositioned Dunning for sex and sexually assaulted her.

Weinstein was not criminally charged in connection with Dunning's allegations – but the prosecution used her testimony to show a pattern of behavior.

In March 2020, Weinstein was found guilty of criminal sexual assault in the first degree and rape in the third degree.

=== Former Washington Commanders employees ===
Alongside Lisa Banks, Katz represented 40 former employees of the Washington Commanders. The clients accused the organization of fostering a toxic and abusive work environment for years, in which women were frequently subjected to sexual harassment. After these allegations were reported on by the Washington Post, the team hired an outside law firm to conduct an independent investigation, which was later taken over by the NFL. The team was fined $10 million after the investigation was completed, but the full results have not been made public. Katz and Banks have been vocal critics of the NFL and its Commissioner Roger Goodell for their refusal to release the investigative report. In April 2023, these allegations, and the subsequent investigation, ultimately led to the sale of the team.

=== Dr. Rick Bright ===
Debra Katz and Lisa Banks represent Dr. Rick Bright, a federal scientist who served as director of the Department of Health and Human Services’ Biomedical Advanced Research and Development Authority until his removal in April 2020.

Dr. Bright alleged that he was retaliated against after raising concerns about the federal government's lack of medical protective equipment, and its apparent unwillingness to take urgent action to adequately prepare for and respond to the coronavirus pandemic. Additionally, Dr. Bright objected to the Trump administration's “reckless and chaotic” response to the pandemic, and the administration's promotion of potentially dangerous drugs – specifically, the antimalarial drug hydroxychloroquine – through approval processes, despite pressure from his superiors who Dr. Bright believed were acting on political motivations, rather than scientific merit.

Following his termination from the Department of Health and Human Services, Dr. Bright accepted a position with the Rockefeller Foundation as Senior Vice President of Pandemic Prevention and Response. In August 2021, it was announced that Dr. Bright had reached a settlement with the government for an undisclosed amount.

=== Dr. Julian Craig ===
Debra Katz represented Dr. Julian Craig, the former Chief Medical Officer of United Medical Center in Southeast Washington. In November 2017, Dr. Craig testified at a D.C. Council hearing regarding unsafe and fraudulent practices being implemented by Veritas of Washington, a consulting firm contracted to manage the hospital. Following his testimony, Dr. Craig was terminated by the D.C. Council.

=== Janet Herold ===
Debra Katz and Alexis Ronickher represented Janet Herold, a senior attorney at the U.S. Department of Labor who filed a whistleblower complaint against then-Secretary of Labor Eugene Scalia. According to Ms. Herold's complaint, Scalia abused his power as secretary and intervened in settlement discussions involving a company with ties to the Trump administration. When she objected to his actions, she was reassigned to a non-legal position in Chicago. After filing an official whistleblower complaint, she was terminated, though she was later reinstated.

=== Accuser of Congressman Pat Meehan ===
Debra Katz and Alexis Ronickher represented a former aide to Congressman Patrick Meehan who accused the Pennsylvania representative of sexual harassment. Meehan and the aide reached a confidential settlement using taxpayer money, which became public in January 2018. A few months later, Meehan resigned from Congress before the House Ethics Committee could complete its full investigation.

=== Accuser of Congressman Eric Massa ===
Katz represented a former staffer of Congressman Eric Massa in his sexual harassment complaint against Massa. Stories published in NBC, Politico and the Washington Post detailed the egregious sexual harassment suffered by many of Massa's staffers, and the power structure put in place to facilitate such behavior. Massa resigned in March 2010, during a pending House Ethics Committee investigation. In November 2017, it was reported that a number of Massa's former staffers were paid nearly $100,000 of taxpayer funds in settlements.

=== Patricia Wulf, Angela Turner Wilson and other Placido Domingo accusers ===
Debra Katz represents Patricia Wulf, the first woman to come forward publicly with information detailing the sexual harassment allegations against opera star Plácido Domingo, and Angela Turner Wilson, another professional singer with similar claims regarding Domingo. In interviews with the Associated Press and National Public Radio, Ms. Wulf detailed Domingo's repeated unwelcome sexual advances and propositions that created a sexually hostile work environment for women.

Wulf and Wilson's accusations ultimately led to Domingo withdrawing from his Metropolitan Opera performances and submitting his resignation as the director of the Los Angeles Opera. Domingo has either withdrawn from or been removed from all scheduled performances with U.S. opera companies, and several in Europe.

In February 2020, it was reported that the American Guild of Musical Artists (AGMA) reached a deal in which it would limit the union's comments about the investigation into Domingo, and Domingo would pay the union $500,000. The deal fell apart after details were made public by the Associated Press. Domingo has since withdrawn from AGMA.

=== Chloe Caras ===
Katz represented Chloe Caras, a former director of operations for Isabella Eatery in her sexual harassment and retaliation lawsuit against celebrity chef Mike Isabella, Mike Isabella Concepts, and four of his business partners. The lawsuit was settled in May 2018. The financial terms of the settlement remain confidential, but included is a binding agreement requiring the restaurant company to implement harassment training and stronger policies to prevent future sexual harassment.

=== Vanessa C. Tyson ===
Katz represented Vanessa C. Tyson, associate professor at Scripps College, who in 2019 alleged that Justin Fairfax sexually assaulted her in 2004.

=== Michelle Manning Barish ===
Katz represents Michelle Manning Barish, who accused former New York Attorney General Eric Schneiderman of physical and emotional abuse while they were engaged in a romantic relationship.

Ms. Barish came forward in an article by The New Yorker, in which she described Schniederman's pattern of committing physical abuse with a sexual partner, including choking and slapping, as well as engaging in threats and emotional abuse. Soon after the article was published, Schneiderman resigned from his position as Attorney General of New York. He later admitted to abusing Ms. Barish and lost his license to practice law for a year.

== Notable cases ==
=== Feminist Majority Foundation v. University of Mary Washington ===
Debra Katz, Carolyn Wheeler and Joseph Abboud represented members of a student feminist group at the University of Mary Washington who were subjected to online harassment and threats. In December 2018, the 4th Circuit Court of Appeals ruled that university officials had an obligation to proactively protect the students against online sexual harassment, and that such action would not infringe any student's free speech rights. This ruling represents the first time that students have a constitutional right to a school environment free from student-on-student sexual harassment.

=== University of Colorado, Boulder ===
Katz and Lisa Banks brought a Title IX claim on behalf of a graduate student at the University of Colorado alleging retaliation. Katz, Marshall & Banks alleged that CU-Boulder violated Title IX by exposing the student to a sexually hostile academic environment and to retaliation by a tenured professor in the department after her Title IX claims were validated by the university's Office of Discrimination and Harassment. The case settled for $850,000 plus various non-monetary provisions, including a public statement from the University Chancellor stating that settling the claims was "the right thing to do."

=== United States of America ex rel. James Gordon v. ArmorGroup North America, 1:09-cv-01547-RCL ===
In July 2011, ArmorGroup North America and its affiliates paid $7.5 million to resolve allegations that AGNA submitted false claims for payment on a State Department contract to provide armed guard services at the U.S. Embassy in Kabul, Afghanistan. The settlement resolves U.S. claims that in 2007 and 2008, AGNA guards violated the Trafficking Victims Protection Act (TVPA) by visiting brothels in Kabul, and that AGNA's management knew about the guards’ activities. The settlement resolves a whistleblower suit filed in the U.S. District Court for the District of Columbia under seal by James Gordon against AGNA, ArmorGroup International plc, G4S plc and Wackenhut Services Inc. under the qui tam, or whistleblower, provisions of the False Claims Act.

=== Barrett v. Chreky, 634 F.Supp.2d 33 (D.D.C. 2009) ===
A jury in the District Court for the District of Columbia awarded Ronnie Barrett $300,000 in compensatory damages and $2 million in punitive damages in her sexual harassment and retaliation suit against Andre Chreky and the Andre Chreky Salon, one of the top-rated salons in Washington, D.C. Mr. Chreky was the hairdresser to former First Lady Laura Bush. Barrett was a former hair colorist at the salon.

=== Blanton v. Biogen Idec, Inc., Case No. 2006-SOX-4, DOL OALJ (April 18, 2006) ===
In a whistleblower case brought under the Sarbanes-Oxley Act, Katz successfully defeated a motion for a protective order filed by the defendant to prevent the plaintiff from deposing Biogen Idec's CEO, James Mullen. Mr. Blanton alleged that the Boston-based pharmaceutical fired its chief reimbursement expert in retaliation for complaints about illegal kickbacks to physicians.

=== Roger Barnes v. Fannie Mae (October 2004) ===
The Securities and Exchange Commission confirmed allegations made by Roger Barnes, a former Fannie Mae accounting manager, that the mortgage-finance institution illegally altered its accounting information and retaliated against him for complaining about it. The SEC further concluded that Fannie Mae manipulated its earnings through cookie jar accounting and ordered Fannie Mae to restate its earnings. As a result of Mr. Barnes' disclosures, Fannie Mae's management team, including Fannie Mae's CEO and other top executives, were removed from their positions. Ultimately, Fannie Mae's restatement of earnings was one of the largest in U.S. history. Additionally, Barnes received a sizable settlement.

=== Estes v. Georgetown University, 231 F. Supp. 279 (D.D.C. 2002) ===
Jury verdict of $250,000 in compensatory damages and $1 million in punitive damages for claims of sex discrimination, sexual harassment and retaliation.

== Affiliations ==
Katz is vice chair of the board of directors of the Project On Government Oversight. Katz is also on the board of directors of Americans for Peace Now.

== Honors and awards ==
In 2024, Katz was added to Lawdragon’s Hall of Fame, a list recognizing prominent lawyers previously named on Lawdragon's 500 Leading Lawyers in America list. In 2023, Katz also recognized as a trailblazer in Labor and Employment Law by the D.C. Bar, an honor bestowed to only six members of the D.C. Bar. She has also been included annually in Washingtonian Magazine’s list of Top Lawyers since 2004, and is recognized in its Top Lawyers Hall of Fame list.

In 2019, 2021, and 2023, and 2025, Katz was named to the Washingtonian Magazine's list of "The Most Powerful Women in Washington, D.C."

Katz is a Fellow at The College of Labor and Employment Lawyers, a Member of the International Women's Forum, and a Fellow of the American Bar Association. Katz was named the “Civil Rights Lawyer of the Year” for Washington by The Best Lawyers In America for 2018, a pioneering #MeToo attorney by the Washington Post and Washingtonian Magazine, and was listed as one of Forward's 50 American Jews who have had a profound impact in 2018.

Katz was honored as a 2018 Lawyer of the Year by the Metropolitan Washington Lawyers Association along with her colleague, Lisa Banks. The award is presented annually to one or more Washington, DC attorneys who have achieved great accomplishments, and whose work embodies the mission of the association. Katz was recognized for the influential role she has played in the #MeToo movement through her representation of Dr. Christine Blasey Ford, Michelle Manning Barish, Chloe Caras, and Irwin Reiter.

Katz's work representing victims of sexual harassment and assault, discrimination, and retaliation also won her recognition as a Law360 2019 “Titan of the Plaintiffs Bar” – an annual award bestowed upon ten influential plaintiff-side attorneys who had a significant impact in the past year inside and outside the courtroom.

T’ruah, an organization of rabbis and cantors with the mission of advancing human rights around the world, honored Katz with the Raphael Lemkin Human Rights Award during its “Celebration of Human Rights” event.

== Personal life ==
Katz has one son, Ari Katz. She is married to Nicole Berner, a federal appeals court judge for the United States Court of Appeals for the Fourth Circuit.
