= Lisa J. Banks =

American civil rights and employment lawyer

- Education: Trinity College (BA); University of Denver Sturm College of Law (JD)
- Occupation: Attorney
- Known for: Founding partner of Katz Banks Kumin (formerly Katz, Marshall & Banks)
- Website: www.katzbanks.com

Lisa J. Banks is an American civil rights and employment lawyer, and a founding partner of Katz Banks Kumin LLP (formerly Katz, Marshall & Banks LLP) in Washington, D.C. She has represented alleged victims of sexual harassment and sexual assault, employees in high-profile workplace rights cases, and whistleblower clients, including Christine Blasey Ford, Dr. Rick Bright, and more than 40 former employees of the Washington Commanders who alleged widespread sexual harassment and financial fraud under the team's owner, Daniel Snyder. The allegations and subsequent investigations contributed to the eventual sale of the team in April 2023.

Banks has been profiled in media coverage of the #MeToo movement for her representation of individuals alleging sexual misconduct against prominent figures such as Supreme Court Justice Brett Kavanaugh, film producer Harvey Weinstein, Washington Commanders owner, Daniel Snyder, and former New York Governor Andrew Cuomo.

During President Trump's second term, Banks represented high-profile government officials who were fired by the administration, including the former chair of the U.S. Equal Employment Opportunity Commission, Charlotte Burrows.

Banks has spoken publicly about the broader societal impact of such cases and contributed to increased willingness among women to report sexual assault and workplace misconduct.

Banks is a co-author of the book Whistleblower Law: A Practitioner's Guide, a comprehensive legal resource on federal and state whistleblower law.

Forbes named Banks to the 2025 America's Top Lawyers list in Labor and Employment. Washingtonian Magazine included her on their list of the "Most Powerful Women in Washington – Legal Powers" in 2023. In 2019, Ms. Magazine honored Banks' role in advocating for survivors of sexual assault, harassment and Title IX discrimination. She has also been recognized from the National Women's Law Center for her work in gender justice.

== Early life and education ==
Banks was raised in Canton, Massachusetts.

She received a Bachelor of Arts degree from Trinity College in Hartford, Connecticut in 1990, and a J.D. from the University of Denver Sturm College of Law in 1995, where she was an editor for the Denver Law Review.

Trinity College recognized the impact of Banks' career in public interest law in their 2020 "50 for the next 50" list.

== Career ==
=== Early career ===
After law school, Banks clerked for Judge Daniel M. Taubman of the Colorado Court of Appeals from 1995 to 1996, and for Judge Gregory K. Scott of the Colorado Supreme Court from 1996 to 1997.

From 1997 to 2000, Banks served as an appellate attorney with the Office of General Counsel of the U.S. Equal Employment Opportunity Commission. In 1999, she served as an attorney advisor in the Office of Counsel to the President.

=== Private practice ===
Banks and law partner Debra Katz founded Katz Banks Kumin LLP (then Katz Marshall & Banks LLP) in 2006. The firm, under Banks and Katz's leadership, is known for handling high-profile cases involving workplace misconduct, retaliation, and sexual harassment.

=== Notable cases ===
==== Former Washington Commanders employees ====
Banks and Katz represented more than 40 former employees of the Washington Commanders, who accused the organization of fostering a toxic and abusive work environment, in which women were frequently subjected to sexual harassment. Following these allegations, the team hired an outside law firm to conduct an independent investigation, which was later taken over by the National Football League. The team was fined $10 million after the investigation was completed, but the findings in the investigation were not made public. These allegations, and the subsequent investigation, ultimately led to the sale of the team in April 2023. Banks discussed her representation of former Washington Football Team employees in a 2021 interview with podcaster Andrew Brandt.

==== Christine Blasey Ford ====
Banks and Katz represented Dr. Christine Blasey Ford, a professor at Palo Alto University, in proceedings before the Senate Judiciary Committee in September 2018. Ford alleged that then-Supreme Court nominee Brett Kavanaugh had sexually assaulted her in the early 1980s when they were teenagers. Kavanaugh was later confirmed to the Supreme Court. Banks' representation of Ford was the subject of a 2018 interview with ABC News.

==== Dr. Rick Bright ====
Banks and Katz represented Dr. Rick Bright, a vaccine expert who alleged that he was removed from his position at the U.S. Department of Health and Human Services in retaliation for warning administration officials to increase their pandemic preparedness in the run-up to the COVID-19 pandemic. He also objected to providing additional federal funding to Ridgeback Biotherapeutics to develop molnupiravir into a treatment for COVID-19.

==== Boeing whistleblower Sam Salehpour ====
Banks represented whistleblower Sam Salehpour in an FAA complaint against Boeing. Salehpour alleged that the company repeatedly dismissed serious safety and quality control concerns in the construction of the 787 and 777 aircraft. He testified before Congress in April 2024 regarding his claims and alleged retaliation.

==== Charlotte Burrows ====
Banks and Katz represented Charlotte Burrows, a Democratic member and former chair of the U.S. Equal Employment Opportunity Commission (EEOC), after she was fired by President Donald Trump in January 2025. Burrows hired the firm to explore potential legal options challenging her removal, an unprecedented action against an EEOC commissioner.

== Public service ==
Banks is the chair of the Avalon Theater in Washington, D.C.
