= Peter Goldblum =

American psychologist (born 1946)

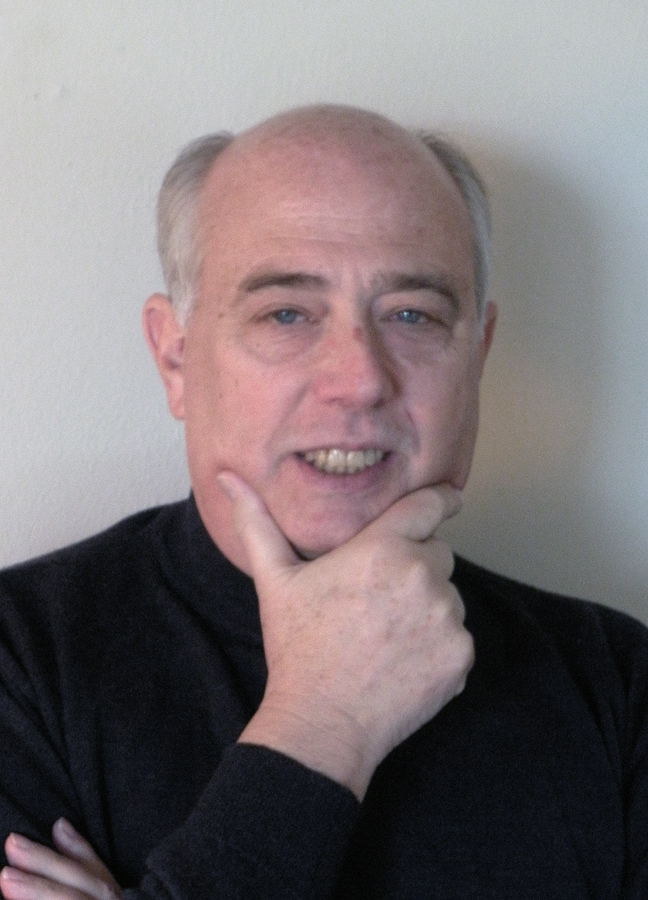
- Born: April 16, 1946; Port Arthur, Texas, U.S.
- Died: August 1, 2026 (aged 80); San Francisco, California, U.S.
- Occupation: Emeritus Professor

Academic work
- Discipline: Psychology, Public Health
- Institutions: Palo Alto University, Stanford University, UCSF Alliance Health Project

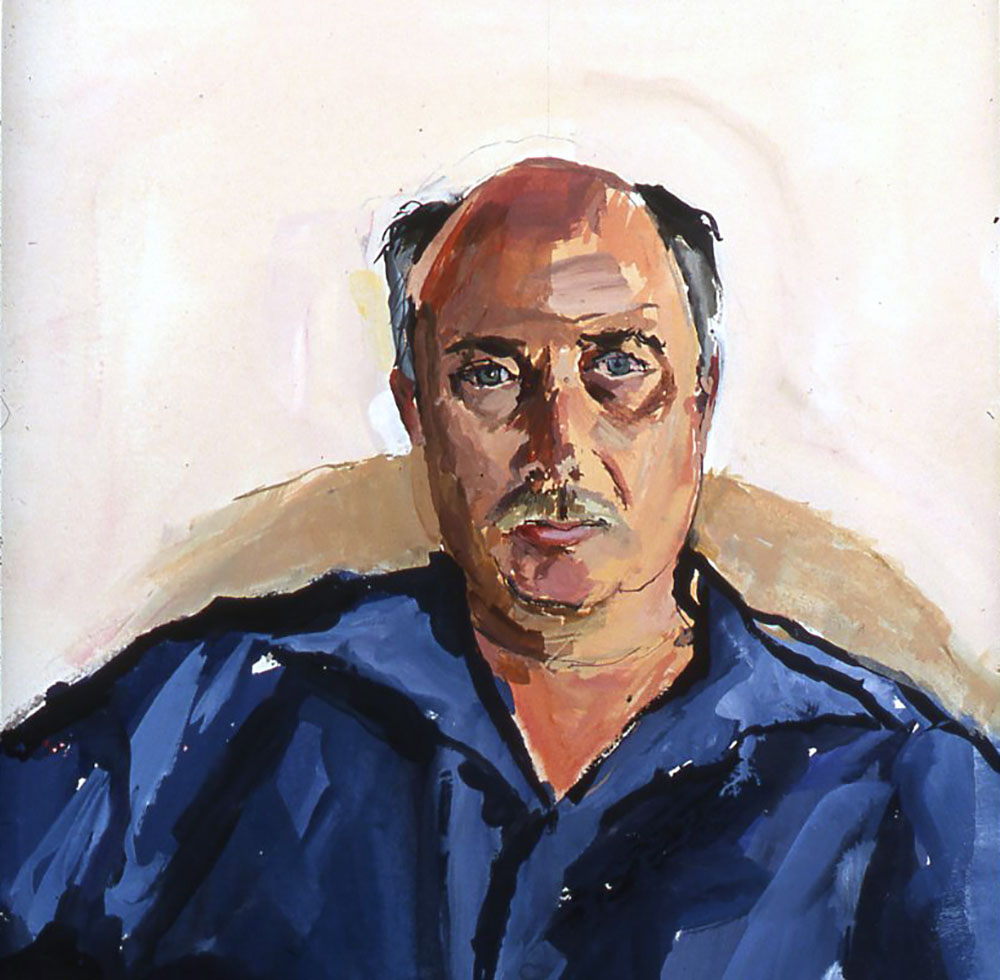
Portrait of Peter Goldblum by Frank Born, 2002

Peter Goldblum (April 16, 1946 – August 1, 2026) was an American psychologist who was Professor Emeritus and Founding Director of the LGBTQ+ Area of Emphasis at Palo Alto University (PAU). He founded one of PAU's Gronowski Center's specialty clinics, the Sexual and Gender Identities Clinic (SGIC), and one of PAU's research labs, the Center for LGBTQ Evidence-based Applied Research (CLEAR). He has engaged in the development of community-based mental health programs and policies for the LGBTQ+ population in the San Francisco Bay Area.

== Early life ==
Goldblum was born in Port Arthur, Texas on April 16, 1946. He was the third child of Harvey Helmut Goldblum and Tina Jankelson Goldblum. Harvey Goldblum was a refugee from Nazi Germany who came to the US in 1935 and worked as a physician in private practice. Tina Goldblum was a graduate from Radcliffe College who met Harvey at the Council for Jewish Women in New York, where she worked as a social worker.

== Education ==
Goldblum's career as a mental health provider began upon graduation from the University of Texas at Austin in 1969, when he was hired as a psychological intern at the Polk State School and Hospital in Franklin, Pennsylvania, where he worked with developmentally disabled people. In the Army he was assigned as a social worker on a psychiatric ward at Fort Gordon, GA, where he helped design a discharge program using psychodrama techniques to prepare patients for return to civilian life. In 1970, after his discharge from the US Army, he went to New York City to attend Teachers College, Columbia University where he earned a Master's degree in psychology and teaching.

After a brief stay in Paris, where he studied dance and art, Goldblum moved to San Francisco to complete his doctoral education and pursue a career as an LGBTQ+ focused psychologist. While applying for graduate schools, he worked as a Psychiatric Technician Educator at Napa College, training psychology technicians to work at Napa State Hospital. During this time, his first life partner committed suicide. This led Goldblum to pursue a journey to understand suicide and bereavement in the LGBTQ+ community.

While waiting on acceptance into doctoral programs, Goldblum spent a year obtaining an MPH in the Leadership Program in Community Mental Health at UC Berkeley. He completed his Public Health Internship at the newly formed Pacific Center for Human Growth in Berkeley, CA, where he designed and implemented a program that brought mental health practitioners from Berkeley Mental Health Center and volunteers from the Pacific Center into a personal and professional dialogue.

In 1978, he was accepted into the newly opened Pacific Graduate School of Psychology as a member of the second class. During this time, he continued to concentrate his studies and research on LGBTQ issues. His dissertation was entitled "Psychosocial Factors Associated with the Risk of Attempted Suicide by Homosexual Men," which was defended and published in 1984. His dissertation chair was James Billings.

He received his Ph.D. from Pacific Graduate School of Psychology (now PAU), his MPH from UC Berkeley School of Public Health, and his MA in Psychology and Teaching from Teachers College, Columbia University.

== Career ==
In 1980, Goldblum joined Patrick McGraw and Joe Brewer as Coordinator of Psychological Services for the Resource Foundation, a free-standing program that provided health education for gay men with or at risk for Chronic Hepatitis B. He also taught a class in Gay Men's Health at City College of San Francisco. He was hired by the San Francisco Department of Public Health to be one of the original behavioral health consultants to develop HIV prevention programs for gay men.

In 1982, he was selected as one of the six original consultants to the San Francisco AIDS Activity Office to help design the AIDS prevention strategy for the County of San Francisco. As an outgrowth of that consultation, he helped found and was hired as the original deputy director and project lead for prevention services of the UCSF AIDS Health Project (AHP), which was later renamed the UCSF Alliance Health Project in Spring 2013.

In 1987, after his life partner Kenneth Payne was diagnosed with AIDS, he left UCSF and focused full-time on his private practice of psychotherapy, consultation, and caregiving. The emphasis of his practice was working with gay men and people with HIV-related concerns, and he became a member of the professional staff at Davies Hospital's HIV Center of Excellence in the Castro District of San Francisco. During this time, he completed his first book with Martin Delaney and Joe Brewer, Strategies for Survival: A Gay Men's Manual for the Age of AIDS. This book was translated by the Schorer Foundation in Amsterdam for broader European distribution (Strategie voor overleving: Handboek voor de confrontatie met AIDS.)

After his partner's death, Goldblum concentrated on national and international consultation. These projects included, working with the Foundation for Interfaith Research and Ministry, Houston, TX., the Willamette AIDS Council, Eugene, OR, At the First International Biopsychosocial Conference on HIV, Amsterdam. He served on the scientific advisory committee, discussion moderator for two panel discussions: "Health Worker Burnout" and "Group Approaches for AIDS Prevention" (1991). He also became involved in a two-year collaboration with choreographer Ellen Bromberg, video artist Doug Rosenberg, and dancer/choreographer John Henry. In this collaboration he led audience discussion after each of four productions of dance piece, "Singing Myself a Lullaby" (1994-1996). He is also interviewed in a documentary with the same name. In 1989, he joined Susan Nolen-Hoeksema to help design and implement the Stanford AIDS and Bereavement Study with graduate student Sarah Erickson. The result of this study is the UCSF Monograph, Working with AIDS bereavement: A comprehensive approach for mental health providers.

In 2000, Goldblum returned to UCSF AIDS Health Project as Senior Psychologist and Coordinator of the Considering Work Project. Goldblum helped establish a community coalition consisting of private HIV employment professionals, the Positive Resources Center, the San Francisco Department of Vocation Rehabilitation, and the Considering Work Project to provide integrated services for those who need vocational assessment, rehabilitation, and placement. From this work, he and Betty Kohlenberg developed A Client-Focused Model for Considering Work" published in Journal of Vocational Counseling.

In 2005, Larry Beutler, a psychotherapy researcher and Director of Clinical Training at the Palo Alto University approached Goldblum to be his associate director. After three months, Beutler decided to retreat to the faculty, Goldblum was then hired to replace him. Goldblum then collaborated with Beutler on his psychotherapy research, specifically designing the Sexual Minority Stress Scale for the Systematic Treatment Selection program. As a result of his negotiations related to the Clinical Directorship, Goldblum was allowed to start a program of LGBTQ Psychology at Palo Alto University in 2009. In this capacity he founded the LGBTQ Area of Emphasis, Center for LGBTQ Evidence-based Applied Research, and the Sexual and Gender Identities Clinic. In the first applied research project, Goldblum joined with Mimi Fystrom, Amanda Houston-Hamilton, and Allison Briscoe Smith to plan and implement a comprehensive evaluation of the Human Rights Campaign's Welcoming Schools Guide Pilot Program in the San Francisco Unified School District, funded by a grant from the James Hormel Small Change Foundation.

As a visiting scholar at Stanford University, he previously co-directed the HIV Bereavement and Caregiver Study. His contributions to the psychological literature include material on LGBTQ+ bullying, gay men's health, suicide and culture, end of life issues, HIV, AIDS bereavement, and affirmative therapy.

In 2015, Goldblum, co-founded the Multicultural Suicide Research Center (MSRC), a research group with fellow American psychologists Joyce Chu and Bruce Bongar at Palo Alto University, and co-developed the Cultural Theory for Suicide Risk. The MSRC would further examine this theory through the creation of the Assessment for Risk of Suicide (CARS), a clinical tool used measure forms of cultural suicide risk altogether. This psychological measure assesses for symptoms consistent with suicidality within ethnic and sexual minority populations.

As a part of the CLEAR lab, Goldblum co-developed the Sexual Minorities Stress Scale (SMSS) in collaboration with UCSF AIDS Health Project. This psychological measure is a 58-item self-report tool that assesses for symptoms consistent with clinically elevated sexual minority stress within sexual minority populations. The SMSS was later adapted and validated by Iniewicz and colleagues in 2017, then described in further detail and further explored by Reyes and colleagues in 2023 .

== Retirement ==
Goldblum worked as Behavioral Health Consultant to Floyd Thompkins in Project Trust. He continued to work within this community collaborative project with Lisa Brown and Thompkins until his death, which included exploring a proposed model of cross cultural collaboration.

In March 2023, Thompkins, Goldblum, and Stanford/PGSP psychology graduate student William Booker developed a model for intergenerational and cross-cultural engagement within the queer community. conclusions to a diverse queer community within Stanford University, facilitated by David Patino.

== Awards ==
- 2013: American Psychological Association (APA) Division 44 (Society for the Psychology of Sexual Orientation and Gender Diversity) Distinguished Contributions to Education and Training Award

== Selected publications ==
=== Books ===
- Delaney, Martin; Goldblum, Peter; Brewer, Joe (1987). Strategies for Survival: A Gay Men's Health Manual for the Age of AIDS. St. Martin's Press. ISBN 978-0-312-00558-0.
- Goldblum, Peter; Erickson, Sarah (1999). Working with AIDS Bereavement: A Comprehensive Approach for Mental Health Providers. UCSF AIDS Health Project. ISBN 978-1-879168-03-9.
- Goldblum, P.; Espelage, D. L.; Chu, J.; Bongar, B., eds. (2015). Youth suicide and bullying: Challenges and strategies for prevention and intervention. Oxford University Press.

=== Journal articles ===
- Lefevor, G. T., Goldblum, P., Dowling, K. T., Goodman, J. A., Hoeflein, B., & Skidmore, S. J. (2022). First do no harm: Principles of care for clients with sexual identity confusion and/or conflict. Psychotherapy, 59(4), 487–497. https://doi.org/10.1037/pst0000426
- Thompkins, Floyd; Goldblum, Peter; Lai, Tammy; Reynolds, Jahmeer; Lachter, Randi; Mhatre, Pooja G.; Vakharia, Shirin; Thompson, Sheila M.; Brown, Lisa M. (2023-02-16). "Using Cross-Cultural Collaboration to Establish a Working Coalition for An Equitable COVID-19 Vaccine Program". Journal of Humanistic Psychology 00221678221140625. doi:10.1177/00221678221140625. ISSN 0022-1678. PMC 9941452.
- Goldblum, P., Testa, R. J., Pflum, S., Hendricks, M. L., Bradford, J., & Bongar, B. (2012). The relationship between gender-based victimization and suicide attempts in transgender people. Professional Psychology: Research and Practice, 43(5), 468–475. https://doi.org/10.1037/a0029605
- Chu, J., Maruyama, B., Wickham, R., Batchelder, H., Goldblum, P., & Bongar, B. (2020). Cultural pathways for suicidal ideation and behaviors. Cultural Diversity and Ethnic Minority Psychology, 26(3), 367-377. doi: 10.1037/cdp0000307
- Chu, J.P., Floyd, R., Diep, H., Pardo, S., Goldblum, P., & Bongar, B. (2013). A tool for the culturally competent assessment of suicide: The Cultural Assessment of Risk for Suicide (CARS) measure. Psychological Assessment, 25(2), 424-434. https://doi.org/10.1037/a0031264
- Chu, J.P., Goldblum, P., Floyd, R., & Bongar, B. (2010). The cultural theory and model of suicide. Applied and Preventive Psychology, 14, 25-40. https://doi.org/10.1016/j.appsy.2011.11.001

== Personal life ==
Goldblum lives in San Francisco with his husband, Michael Carr. They have been partners since 1996, and married in 2014 after gay marriage was legalized in California.
