= Neužil =

Neužil (feminine: Neužilová) is a Czech surname. It can be translated as both "(he) did not use" and "(he) did not enjoy". Anglicized and Germanized form of the name is Neuzil. Notable people with the surname include:

- Kathleen Neuzil, American medical academic
- Ryan Neuzil (born 1997), American football player
- Václav Neužil (born 1979), Czech actor
- Wally Neuzil (1894–1917), Austrian nurse
