= Lisa M. Brown =

American clinical psychologist

- Occupation(s): Professor; Researcher
- Board member of: ABPP (certified); Disasters and Older Adults Special Interest Group of the GSA (Founder); APA Division 20 (former President); National Biodefense Science Board Federal Advisory Committee; National Advisory Committee on Seniors and Disasters for HHS
- Children: 4
- Awards: Fulbright Scholarship Program 2014 & 2015

Academic background
- Education: B.S., M.A., PhD
- Alma mater: City University of New York; Palo Alto University

Academic work
- Discipline: Clinical Psychology
- Sub-discipline: trauma, resilience, stress, disaster, aging, global mental health

Lisa M. Brown is a clinical psychology professor at Palo Alto University and an adjunct professor at Stanford University School of Medicine. Her research areas include trauma, resilience, global mental health, aging, vulnerable populations, human rights, and disasters.

== Education ==
Brown received a Bachelor of Science (B.S.) in gerontology from the City University of New York in 1980. In 2002, Brown simultaneously received her master's (M.A.) and PhD degrees in clinical psychology at the Pacific Graduate School at Palo Alto University.

== Publications and research ==
Brown's research areas of interest include aging, trauma, resilience, disasters, terrorism, violence, human rights, suicide, assessment, treatment, and vulnerable and underserved populations. Brown has authored more than 150 articles and book chapters.

Brown was a co-editor for the 2007 Oxford University Press on the Psychology of Terrorism and the 2011 Psychological First Aid Field Guide for Nursing Home Residents.

Brown has also worked with active and retired service duty members. She explored active-duty members' suicidal ideation and behavior using latent analysis. The goal of the study was to identify subgroups that can share similar thoughts and patterns to target intervention and support. Brown also researched homeless veterans and how age can impact the outcomes for those in transitional housing programs.

Brown was a co-author of Trauma-Informed Care Guidebook for Implementation of Trauma-Informed Best Practices for International Criminal Investigations which was published by United Nations. In addition to writing guidebooks, Brown also does assessments and evaluations of systems already in place. She examined the support and intervention system for survivors of sexual assault, DAHLIA. Within this review, she and colleagues found that DAHLIA is moderately successful in relieving the immediate feelings of anxiety and depression in individuals.

Brown has researched how the COVID-19 pandemic impacted both practitioners and patients focused on long-term care within psychology. In addition to pandemics, natural disasters like hurricanes are an area of interest for Brown. After the 2004 (Charley, Frances, Ivan, and Jeanne) and 2005 (Cindy, Dennis, Katrina, Ophelia, Rita, and Wilma) hurricanes in Florida, Brown conducted a study of the experience of faculty and staff in assisted living homes for both shelter in place and evacuation protocols. The study found that deciding which protocol to put in place was difficult and electricity was vital to resident well-being. They suggested that assisted living facilities should develop disaster preparedness plans in conjunction with local and state emergency offices.
