= Ricardo Felipe Munoz =

Ricardo Felipe Muñoz
- Occupations: Academic, psychologist, and author.
- Awards: Martin Luther King Jr. Award, University of California, San Francisco (UCSF); George Sarlo Award for Excellence in Teaching (UCSF); UCSF Postdoctoral Scholars Association; Outstanding Faculty; Mentorship Award; Outstanding Mentor Award, Association for Behavioral and Cognitive Therapies

Academic background
- Education: B.A. in Psychology, MA, and Ph.D. in Clinical Psychology
- Alma mater: Stanford University; University of Oregon, Eugene

Academic work
- Institutions: University of California, San Francisco; Palo Alto University; Stanford University

Ricardo Felipe Muñoz is an academic, psychologist, and author. He is Distinguished Professor of Clinical Psychology at Palo Alto University, and Professor Emeritus of Psychology at the School of Medicine at the University of California, San Francisco (based at San Francisco General Hospital—SFGH). He serves as Adjunct Clinical Professor at Stanford University, and Affiliated Faculty at the University of California, Berkeley.

Muñoz was elected Fellow of the American Association for the Advancement of Science (AAAS) in 2016 "for distinguished contributions towards the prevention of major depression and the development of Internet interventions to improve mental health worldwide." His research program has had a particular focus on making behavioral health interventions accessible to low-income and Spanish-speaking populations. He is the Founding Director of the Institute for International Internet Interventions for Health (i4Health) at Palo Alto University, and the Depression Clinic at San Francisco General Hospital (founded in 1985 with Psychology Fellows Jeanne Miranda and Sergio Aguilar-Gaxiola), and has been awarded numerous awards for his teaching and research work in the field. He has published numerous scientific journal articles, book chapters, and books including, Control Your Depression, The Prevention of Depression: Research and Practice, and Controlling Your Drinking.

Muñoz has been elected Fellow of the American Psychological Association and Association for Psychological Science.

== Early life and education ==
Muñoz was born April 30, 1950, and grew up in Chosica. He was the oldest of four children. His parents were Clara Luz and Luis Alberto Muñoz. Their family emigrated to the United States when he was 10. His family lived in the Mission District, the Latino barrio of the city.

Muñoz graduated with a B.A. in psychology in 1972 from Stanford University. His Senior Thesis advisor was Albert Bandura. He completed an M.A. and Ph.D. in Clinical Psychology between 1972 and 1977 from the University of Oregon. His dissertation chair was Peter Lewinsohn.

== Career ==
Following his doctoral degree in 1977, Muñoz had his academic career at the University of California, San Francisco (UCSF) as a professor in residence based at San Francisco General Hospital (SFGH) until he transitioned to professor emeritus in 2012 and became distinguished professor of clinical psychology at Palo Alto University. He also holds appointments at Stanford University as adjunct clinical professor and is a member of the affiliated faculty in the department of psychology at the University of California, Berkeley.

Muñoz was chief psychologist at San Francisco General Hospital from 1987 to 2012, and director of the clinical psychology training program from 1992 to 2012. He was founding director of the Depression Clinic at San Francisco General Hospital and served there from 1985 to 1995. He founded and directed the UCSF/SFGH Latino Mental Health Research Program between 1992 and 2012. He served as a founding director of the UCSF/SFGH Internet World Health Research Program Center from 2004 to 2012. He is the founding director of the Institute for International Internet Interventions for Health (i4Health) at Palo Alto University, established in 2012.

== Research ==
Muñoz has authored more than 125 peer-reviewed journal articles and has been cited over 20,000 times. His research works span smoking cessation, depression prevention, cognitive behavioral therapy (CBT), and evidence-based internet intervention, with a particular focus on mental health of Latinos, and low-income minorities.

=== Depression prevention and treatment ===
Muñoz and his colleagues carried out the first randomized controlled trial designed to test whether the onset of major depressive episodes could be prevented in the 1980s. His 1993 book The Prevention of Depression: Research and Practice describes the study and presents a series of basic scientific concepts and research steps necessary to carry out prevention research, as well as ethical and philosophical implications of this line of work. His 2010 Annual Review of Clinical Psychology article on Prevention of major depression summarizes the research progress made until then. His highly cited work, "Emotion regulation and mental health" emphasized emotional regulation as a key feature of mental health. The online book The Healthy Management of Reality, intended for the general public describes how individuals can use psychological methods to shape their personal lives.

The methods used in the depression prevention manuals developed by Muñoz and colleagues stem from the work of Peter Lewinsohn, his dissertation chair. Their 2011 Annual Review of Clinical Psychology chapter describes the origins and current status of Lewinsohn's behavioral activation approach to the treatment of depression. Lewinsohn's Coping with Depression course was a major influence on Muñoz's development of depression prevention and treatment manuals at San Francisco General Hospital intended for use with low-income, and ethnic minority participants. He and his students have also investigated the effectiveness and the degree to which CBT can be adapted to treat depression in low-income African American women.

Muñoz was a member of the National Institute of Mental Health Psychosocial Intervention Development Workgroup, which published a 2002 article on this topic, focusing on promoting innovation and increasing access.

He has also been a member of the three Consensus Committees of the National Academies of Science, Engineering, and Medicine focused on the prevention of mental disorders and the promotion of mental, emotional, and behavioral development. The 1994 report concluded that risk factor for mental disorders were well known but that there was as yet no evidence that mental disorders could be prevented. The 2009 report found that some mental disorders could be prevented and that there was early evidence for promotion of mental health. The 2019 report recommended that the nation should implement the evidence-based interventions known to prevent depression and other mental disorders and to scale up preventive interventions. It also recommended that interventions go beyond a focus limited on individuals, and expand to family, community, and societal interventions.

=== Depression prevention in perinatal women ===
Another line of Muñoz's research concentrates on preventing depression in perinatal women. Given the high rate of major depression in women, and the far-reaching negative impacts, he and his colleagues have argued that treatment is not enough and that depression must be prevented in women. In 2019, the US Preventive Services Task Force recommended that clinicians provide pregnant and postpartum person at risk for perinatal depression with evidence-based interventions and a companion article identified two interventions that have been shown to reduce incidence of new cases of perinatal depression by 50% or more, including the Mothers and Babies Course, which was developed in Spanish and English by Muñoz and colleagues at San Francisco General Hospital.

=== Evidence-based internet interventions ===
Muñoz is a pioneer in the development of evidence-based internet interventions. He has been focusing his research on the development, evaluation, and dissemination of digital interventions since the 1990s. In a 2010 article, he suggested that health disparities are partly due to people relying on consumable health interventions, that is, interventions that require human time each time they are administered. Fully automated Internet interventions are non-consumable, and thus could be disseminated globally at comparatively lower marginal cost, and thus could contribute to a reduction in health disparities. Since clinical trials have often included inadequate samples of people of color (POC), the treatment manuals at San Francisco General Hospital particularly for low-income ethnic populations have been empirically evaluated there as well as in several other settings, nationally and internationally, with promising results. These interventions have also used non-traditional methods of delivery, including television, surface mail, and the Internet. The evidence-based interventions for preventing perinatal depression for low-income minorities including Latina women developed by his research group have been ported to online interventions. Data from an online postpartum depression randomized controlled trial provided information on the effectiveness of keywords for the recruitment of participants to online outcome studies.

While speaking with Tina Rosenberg at The New York Times, Muñoz considered online CBT as an effective tool for preventing depression. Highlighting the issues with the health insurance system, he stated, "No one will pay for face-to-face therapy for someone who doesn't yet have a disorder. There is a clear need here for the online version." Addressing his vision of an online therapy model, he commented, "I dream of systematically filling in a grid in which columns are health issues (smoking, depression...) and the rows are languages (English, Spanish...). He further added that "This is totally within our ability to do right now. We have the knowledge and the digital tools." Furthermore, taking into account the costs associated with the face-to-face interventions and health care disparities, he and his colleagues have suggested that the health care system develop Massive Open Online Interventions (MOOIs, similar to MOOCs, or Massive Open Online Courses) to deliver behavioral health services worldwide and that these MOOIs be housed in online portals called Digital Apothecaries ideally open to all users at no charge.

Muñoz and his colleague Blanca Pineda launched the first Digital Apothecary on April 15, 2020.

=== Smoking Cessation ===
Muñoz has also conducted extensive research on smoking cessation as a member of Sharon Hall's research program on maintaining nonsmoking. His contributions have been in the addition of mood management approaches to Hall's smoking cessation methods, given that depression symptoms are sometimes related to inability to quit smoking or likelihood of relapse. They have found that cognitive-behavioral interventions can increase abstinence rates in smokers with a history of depression. They have also investigated the efficacy of antidepressants, bupropion hydrochloride and nortriptyline hydrochloride, and psychological interventions for smoking cessation, and regarded both effective in producing short-term abstinence in smokers compared to placebo but have limited efficacy in producing sustained abstinence.

Muñoz collaborated with Eliseo Pérez-Stable on a smoking cessation project focused on Spanish-speaking smokers. They found that a mood management intervention added to a standard smoking cessation intervention in the form of a printed brochure could significantly increase the rates of abstinence when administered entirely via surface mail. This finding that a randomized controlled trial could be carried out using printed materials provided via surface mail led Muñoz to question whether similar studies could be carried out via the then new World Wide Web. In 1997, Muñoz submitted the first of several grants that became part of the Tomando Control de su Vida (Taking Control of Your Life) research program.

== Personal life ==
He married in 1979 and has two children and a granddaughter.

== Awards and honors ==
- 1991 – Chancellor Award for Dr. Martin Luther King Jr. Leadership, University of California, San Francisco
- 1994 – Lela Rowland Prevention Award, National Mental Health Association
- 2001 – George Sarlo Award for Excellence in Teaching, Department of Psychiatry, UCSF
- 2010 – Inducted into the Stanford Multicultural Alumni Hall of Fame
- 2011 – Honorary Doctorate, Ricardo Palma University
- 2018 – Outstanding Mentor Award, Association for Behavioral and Cognitive Therapies

== Bibliography ==
=== Books ===
- Social and Psychological Research in Community Settings (1979) ISBN 9780875894232
- Depression Prevention: Research Directions (1987) ISBN 9780891164524
- Control Your Depression (1992) ISBN 978-0671762421
- The Prevention of Depression: Research and Practice (1993) ISBN 9780801844966
- Controlling Your Drinking (2013) ISBN 978-1462507597

=== Selected articles ===
- Muñoz, R. F., Cuijpers, P., Smit, F., Barrera, A.Z., & Leykin, Y. (2010). Prevention of major depression. Annual Review of Clinical Psychology, 6, 181–212.
- Dimidjian, S., Barrera Jr, M., Martell, C., Muñoz, R. F., & Lewinsohn, P. M. (2011). The origins and current status of behavioral activation treatments for depression. Annual review of clinical psychology, 7, 1-38.
- Muñoz, R. F., Beardslee, W. R., & Leykin, Y. (2012). Major depression can be prevented. American Psychologist, 67(4), 285.
- Muñoz, R. F., Bunge, E. L., Chen, K., Schueller, S. M., Bravin, J. I., Shaughnessy, E. A., & Pérez-Stable, E. J. (2016). Massive open online interventions: a novel model for delivering behavioral-health services worldwide. Clinical Psychological Science, 4(2), 194–205.
- Muñoz, R. F., Chavira, D. A., Himle, J. A., Koerner, K., Muroff, J., Reynolds, J., ... & Schueller, S. M. (2018). Digital apothecaries: a vision for making health care interventions accessible worldwide. Mhealth, 4.
- Muñoz, R. F., Le, H. N., Barrera, A. Z., & Pineda, B. S. (2021). Leading the charge toward a world without depression: perinatal depression can be prevented. Archives of Women's Mental Health, 24(5), 807–815.
