= Vanessa C. Tyson =

American political scientist

Academic background
- Education: Princeton University (B.A.)
- Alma mater: University of Chicago (M.A., Ph.D.)
- Thesis: Marginalization and influence: Race, representation, and political coalitions in the U.S. House (2011)
- Doctoral advisor: Michael C. Dawson; Cathy J. Cohen

Academic work
- Discipline: Political science
- Institutions: Dickinson College; Scripps College

Vanessa Catherine Tyson is an American political scientist and politician. She is an associate professor of politics at Scripps College and a political science fellow at Stanford University. Tyson was an unsuccessful candidate for California's 57th State Assembly district in the 2020 election, finishing in fifth place with 8.6% of the vote in the nonpartisan primary.

== Early life and education ==
Tyson was raised in Whittier, California. She was the victim of childhood abuse. Tyson was voted "Most likely to succeed," as a senior at La Serna High School. She completed a bachelor of arts in politics and a certificate in African American studies at Princeton University in 1998. She was awarded the Ruth B. Simmons Thesis Prize and the 1998 Spirit of Princeton award. Tyson earned a master's degree and a doctor of philosophy in political science from University of Chicago. Her 2011 dissertation on marginalization and influence in the U.S. House of Representatives was the basis for her book Twists of Fate. Her doctoral advisors were Michael C. Dawson and Cathy J. Cohen.

== Career ==
Tyson was an assistant professor at Dickinson College in the Department of Political Science for about eight years, where she taught courses in American government, political representation, and marginalization of groups though racism, sexism, and homophobia. She left the institution in June 2015 and is currently an associate professor of politics at Scripps College. During the 2018-19 academic year, Tyson was a fellow at Stanford University Center for Advanced Study in the Behavioral Sciences.

In 2019, Tyson, a Democrat, announced her candidacy for the California State Assembly's 57th District. The 57th District includes Tyson's hometown of Whittier, California as well as Norwalk, Hacienda Heights, and La Puente. The incumbent, Ian Calderon, announced in November that he would not be seeking reelection. In her announcement, she stated that she would be focusing on environmental protection, affordable housing, poverty reduction, access to education, and advocacy for women's rights and sexual violence prevention. Five other Democrats and one Republican also filed papers to replace Calderon, including Whittier City Councilmembers Josue Alvarado and Henry Bouchot.

== Personal life ==
In 2019, Tyson alleged that Justin Fairfax had sexually assaulted her in 2004 in his hotel room in Boston. Tyson was volunteering at a Boston rape crisis center at the time. He denied sexually assaulting her and said their encounter was consensual. She hired Katz, Marshall & Banks, the legal team that represented Christine Blasey Ford during the Brett Kavanaugh Supreme Court nomination.

== Selected works ==
=== Books ===
- Tyson, Vanessa C. (2016). Twists of Fate: Multiracial Coalitions and Minority Representation in the US House of Representatives. Oxford University Press. ISBN 9780190630867.
