= Helena Chmura Kraemer =

American mathematician

- Education: University of Manchester
- Alma mater: Smith College (BA); Stanford University (PhD)
- Scientific career
- Fields: Biostatistics, research methodologies
- Institutions: Stanford University
- Thesis: Point Estimation in Learning Models (1963)
- Doctoral advisor: Patrick Suppes

Helena Chmura Kraemer is an American professor emerita of biostatistics at Stanford University. She is known for her work on improving research methodologies, particularly in evaluating measurement reliability, detecting and correcting errors, and optimizing statistical power in studies where biological and behavioral factors intersect. Kraemer is a fellow of the American Statistical Association.

== Education ==
Kraemer completed a Bachelor of Arts in mathematics with Phi Beta Kappa honors from Smith College in 1957. In 1958, she attended University of Manchester as a Fulbright fellow. Kraemer earned a Doctor of Philosophy in statistics from Stanford University in 1963. Her dissertation was titled Point Estimation in Learning Models. Her doctoral advisor was Patrick Suppes.

== Career ==
Kraemer is a professor emerita of biostatistics in the Department of Psychiatry and Behavioral Sciences at Stanford University. She researches the intersection of biological and behavioral research across various fields of medicine. Her work has included psychiatric research, cardiology, pediatrics, and other medical disciplines where behavioral factors play a significant role. Kraemer has contributed to methodologies aimed at addressing research problems where biological and behavioral interests converge, emphasizing the importance of measurement accuracy and the correction of errors in medical research. Kraemer’s research focuses on assessing the quality of measurements, including the evaluation of medical tests for reliability and validity. This work involves identifying potential sources of error in measurements, developing methods to detect these errors, and devising strategies for correcting them. Kraemer has examined the impacts of such errors on both clinical decision-making and scientific research outcomes. Her methodological contributions are aimed at improving the accuracy of research results and minimizing the risk of incorrect inferences.

Kraemer has been involved in a broad range of medical research projects. These have included randomized clinical trials, epidemiological studies, prevention studies, and basic research. In her work on clinical trials and other studies, Kraemer has been interested in issues related to statistical power, the ability of a study to detect an effect if one exists. She has researched strategies to improve statistical power not by increasing sample size, but through research design. Kraemer has also focused on training medical researchers and clinicians to recognize the challenges associated with drawing inferences from research results. She has emphasized the importance of understanding the limitations of research designs and methodologies, as well as the risks of making incorrect conclusions based on flawed or insufficient data. Kraemer's efforts in education and mentorship have aimed to equip researchers with the tools to critically assess the quality of their studies and improve the rigor of medical research.

== Awards and honors ==
Kraemer became a fellow of the American Statistical Association in 1987. She is a member of the American College of Neuropsychopharmacology (1994) and the Institute of Medicine of the National Academies (2003). She was awarded the Franklin Ebaugh Prize from Stanford University and the Harvard Prize in Psychiatric Biostatistics and Epidemiology (2001). In 2014, she was awarded an honorary degree from Wesleyan University.

== Selected works ==
=== Books ===
- Kraemer, Helena Chmura (1992). Evaluating Medical Tests: Objective and Quantitative Guidelines. SAGE Publications. ISBN 9780803946118.
- Kraemer, Helena Chmura; Lowe, Karen Kraemer; Kupfer, David J. (2005). To Your Health: How to Understand What Research Tells Us about Risk. Oxford University Press. ISBN 9780199748181.
- Helzer, John E.; Kraemer, Helena C.; Krueger, Robert F.; Wittchen, Hans-Ulrich; Sirovatka, Paul J.; Regier, Darrel A. (2009). Dimensional Approaches in Diagnostic Classification: Refining the Research Agenda for DSM-V. American Psychiatric Association. ISBN 9780890426548.
- Areán, Patricia A.; Kraemer, Helena Chmura (2013). High Quality Psychotherapy Research: From Conception to Piloting to National Trials. Oxford University Press. ISBN 9780199782468.
- Kraemer, Helen Chmura; Blasey, Christine M. (2015). How Many Subjects?: Statistical Power Analysis in Research. SAGE Publishing. ISBN 978-1483319544.
