= Nicole Berner =

American-Israeli judge (born 1965)

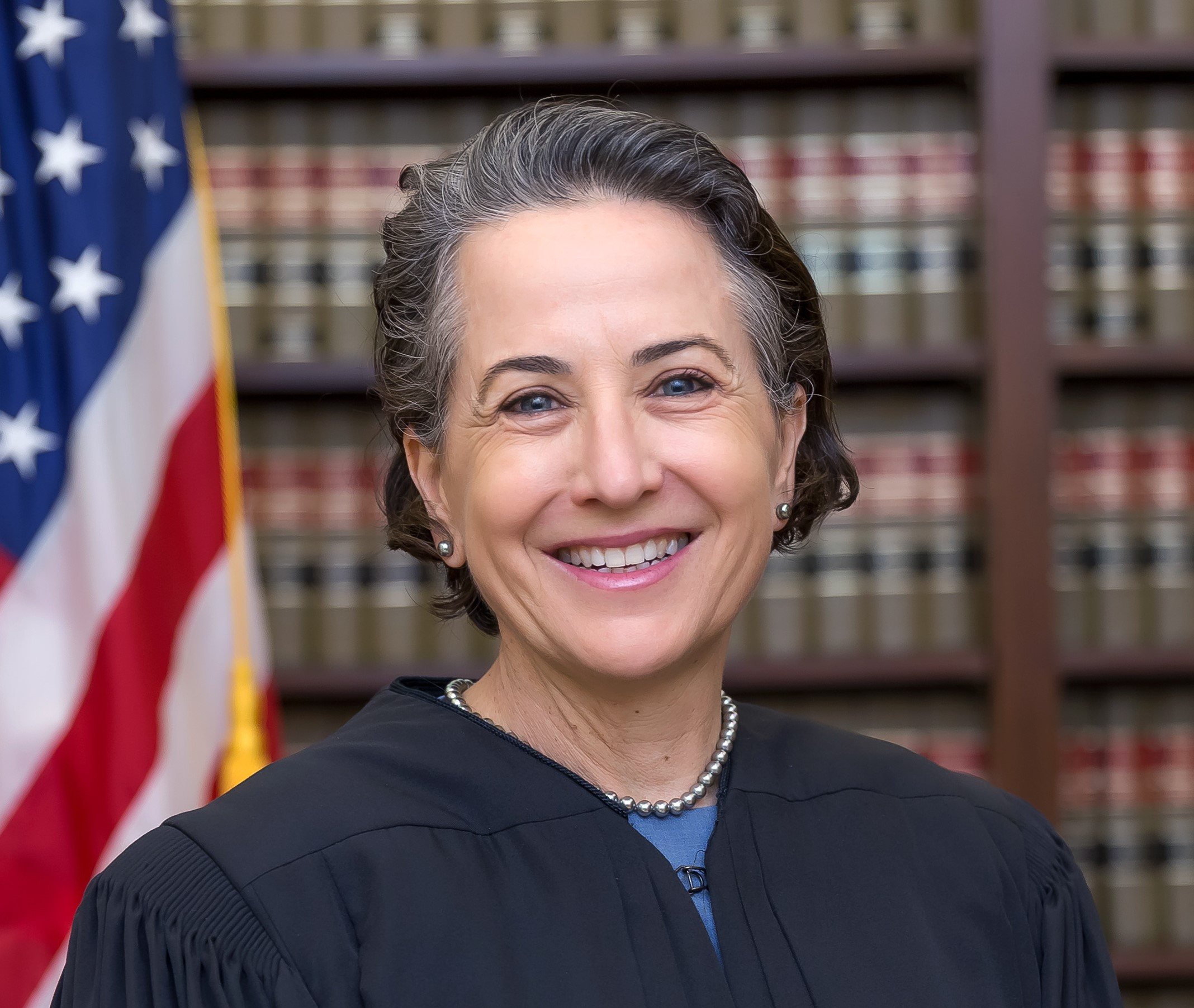

Judge of the United States Court of Appeals for the Fourth Circuit
- Incumbent
- Assumed office March 19, 2024
- Appointed by: Joe Biden
- Preceded by: Diana Gribbon Motz

Personal details
- Born: Nicole Gina Berner; 1965 (age 60–61) Woking, England, UK
- Citizenship: Israel; United Kingdom; United States
- Spouse: Debra Katz
- Children: 3
- Education: University of California, Berkeley (BA, JD, MPP)

Nicole Gina Berner (born 1965) is an American-Israeli lawyer who serves as a United States circuit judge of the United States Court of Appeals for the Fourth Circuit. She served as general counsel for the Service Employees International Union (SEIU) from 2017 to 2024 and a partner at the law firm of James & Hoffman.

== Early life and education ==
Berner was born in Woking, Surrey, England to American parents. During her childhood, her family moved to the United States, settling in Oakland, California. She earned a Bachelor of Arts degree in women's studies from the University of California, Berkeley. During her studies, she spent a semester in Israel studying at the University of Haifa, and decided to move there. After completing her degree, she moved to Israel. In 1990 in Tel Aviv, she founded the Bat Adam organization, an advocacy group for victims of sexual assault and domestic violence.

Berner returned to the United States in 1992 to attend Berkeley School of Law at the University of California, Berkeley. She completed a Juris Doctor from Berkeley School of Law and a Master of Public Policy from the Goldman School of Public Policy at the University of California, Berkeley.

Berner is a citizen of the United States, Israel, and the United Kingdom.

=== Berner-Kadish v. Minister of Interior ===
In 2000, as a dual American-Israeli citizen, represented by the Association for Civil Rights in Israel, Berner and her then-wife Ruti Kadish prevailed in a landmark civil rights case before the Israeli Supreme Court. Berner had legally adopted their son in California, but when the family moved to Israel, attempts to register their son with two mothers were refused by the Ministry of Interior in Israel. The subsequent legal case, Berner-Kadish v. Minister of Interior, challenged the refusal to register Kadish and Berner's second parent adoption of their son. The Israel Supreme Court ruled that the Ministry of Interior must register the adoption decree, accepting legally that the child has two mothers.

== Career ==
From 1996 to 1997, Berner worked as a law clerk for Judge Betty Binns Fletcher of the United States Court of Appeals for the Ninth Circuit, and from 1997 to 1998, she worked as a law clerk for Chief Judge Thelton Henderson of the United States District Court for the Northern District of California. She was a visiting attorney at Yigal Arnon & Co. in Israel from 1999 until 2000, and was a litigation associate at Jenner & Block from 2000 through 2004.

From 2004 to 2006, Berner worked as a staff attorney at Planned Parenthood.

Berner joined the SEIU's legal department as an in-house counsel in 2006 and was named General Counsel in 2017. Her work with the SEIU has included legal efforts to support the Affordable Care Act, to oppose the Defense of Marriage Act, and to oppose an effort to end the Deferred Action for Childhood Arrivals (DACA) program during the Trump administration. She was the lead attorney on the amicus curiae brief filed on behalf of the SEIU in California v. Texas. She was also involved with the Fight for $15 movement.

In 2019, liberal group Demand Justice included Berner on their list of suggested Supreme Court nominees for any future Democratic president. In 2023, Berner was named an adjunct professor of law at Vanderbilt Law School.

Berner is an elected member of the American Law Institute. She is a fellow of the American Bar Foundation and the College of Labor and Employment Lawyers.

=== Federal judicial service ===
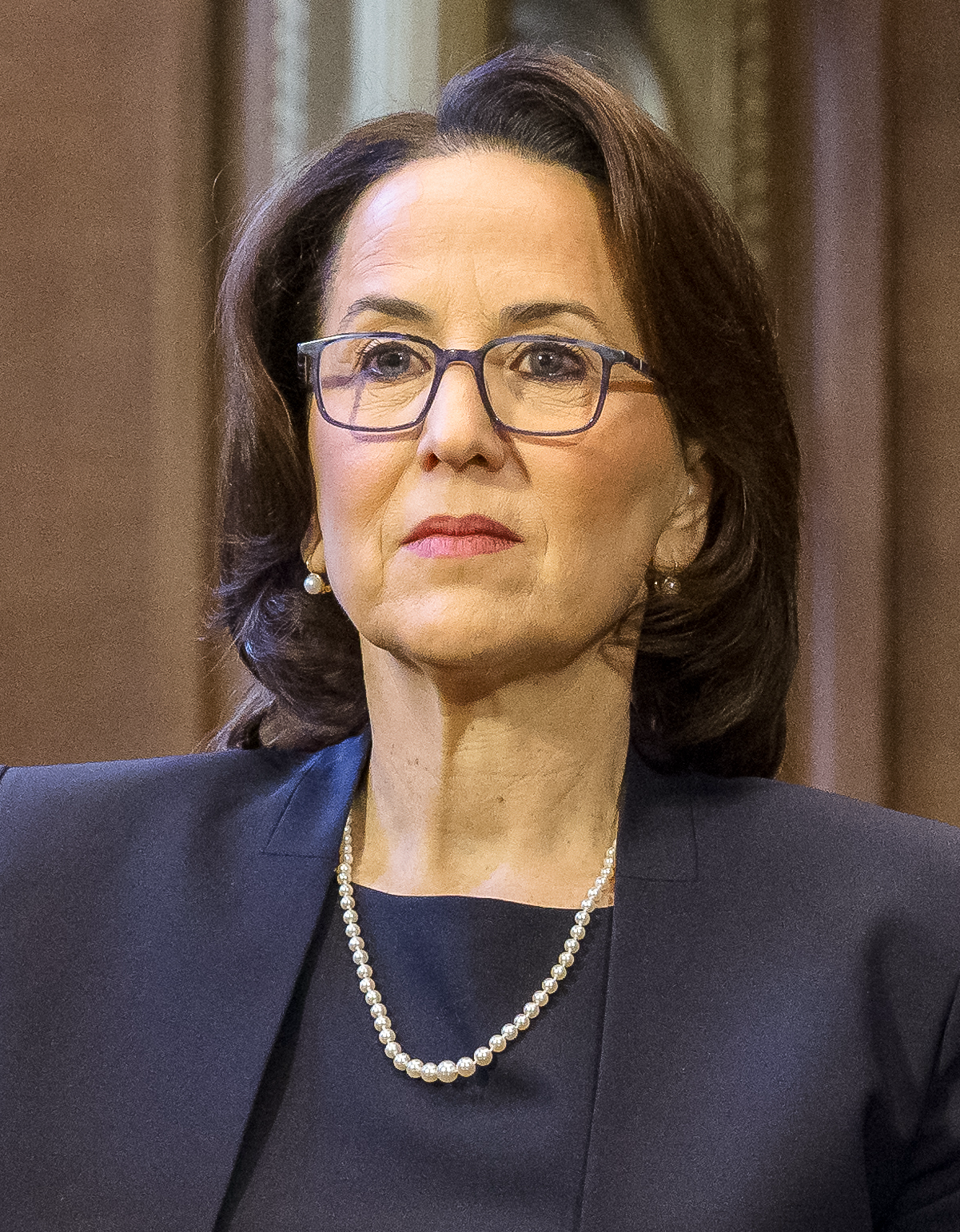
Berner at her Senate Judiciary Hearing

On November 15, 2023, President Joe Biden announced his intent to nominate Berner to serve as a United States circuit judge for the United States Court of Appeals for the Fourth Circuit. On November 27, 2023, her nomination was sent to the Senate. President Biden nominated Berner to the seat vacated by Judge Diana Gribbon Motz, who assumed senior status on September 30, 2022. On December 13, 2023, a hearing on her nomination was held before the Senate Judiciary Committee. During her confirmation hearing, she answered questions, including about her work as general counsel for the SEIU. On January 3, 2024, her nomination was returned to the president under Rule XXXI, Paragraph 6 of the United States Senate and she was renominated on January 8, 2024. On January 18, 2024, her nomination was reported out of committee by an 11–10 party-line vote. On March 14, 2024, the Senate invoked cloture on her nomination by a 48–40 vote. On March 19, 2024, her nomination was confirmed by a 50–47 vote. She received her judicial commission the same day. Berner is the first openly LGBTQ judge to serve on that court.

== Personal life ==
Berner is a resident of Montgomery County, residing in Takoma Park, Maryland, where she and her former wife raised their three sons. She is married to civil rights attorney Debra Katz.

== See also ==
- List of LGBT jurists in the United States

Legal offices
Preceded by Diana Gribbon Motz	Judge of the United States Court of Appeals for the Fourth Circuit; 2024–present	Incumbent
