= Ellen Bromberg =

American dance scholar

Ellen R. Bromberg is an American dance scholar, currently a distinguished professor at University of Utah's School of Dance.

== Previous Work ==
In the 1990s, Bromberg collaborated with American psychologist Dr. Peter Goldblum, video artist Doug Rosenberg, and dancer/choreographer John Henry on a biography dance piece entitled, Singing Myself a Lullaby.
