= Diana Gribbon Motz =

American judge (born 1943)

Diana Motz
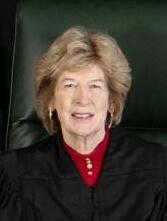
- Motz in 2022

Senior Judge of the United States Court of Appeals for the Fourth Circuit
- Incumbent
- Assumed office September 30, 2022

Judge of the United States Court of Appeals for the Fourth Circuit
- In office June 16, 1994 – September 30, 2022
- Appointed by: Bill Clinton
- Preceded by: Seat established
- Succeeded by: Nicole Berner

Personal details
- Born: Diana Jane Gribbon; July 15, 1943 (age 82) Washington, D.C., U.S.
- Party: Democratic
- Spouse: J. Frederick Motz
- Education: Vassar College (AB); University of Virginia (JD)

Diana Jane Gribbon Motz (born July 15, 1943) is a senior United States circuit judge of the United States Court of Appeals for the Fourth Circuit.

== Early life and education ==
Born in Washington, D.C., Motz was raised in a legal family. Her father was attorney Daniel M. Gribbon, who had clerked for Judge Learned Hand. She earned a Bachelor of Arts degree from Vassar College in 1965 and a Juris Doctor from the University of Virginia School of Law in 1968. She was one of two women in her law school class.

== Professional career ==
Motz worked in private law practice in Baltimore, Maryland for the firm Piper & Marbury (now DLA Piper) from 1968 until 1971. She became the assistant state attorney general for the state of Maryland in 1972, and served in that capacity until 1986, when she returned to private practice. While an assistant state attorney general for Maryland, Motz won a $268,482 judgment against former Vice President Spiro Agnew to recover money he accepted as bribes while he was Governor of Maryland.

In 1991, Motz returned to the public sector, appointed as an associate judge for the Court of Special Appeals of Maryland. She worked in that court until her confirmation by the United States Senate in 1994 as a federal appeals court judge.

== Federal judicial service ==
Motz was nominated by President Bill Clinton on January 27, 1994, to the United States Court of Appeals for the Fourth Circuit, to a new seat authorized by 104 Stat. 5089. She was confirmed by the United States Senate on June 15, 1994, and received commission on June 16, 1994. She is the first woman from Maryland to serve on the Fourth Circuit. She announced that she was going to assume senior status upon confirmation of a successor. She assumed senior status on September 30, 2022 and fully retired in 2024.

Her husband, J. Frederick Motz, had been appointed a federal district court judge by President Ronald Reagan in 1985. The Motzes are the first married couple to each sit on the federal bench. "Yes, it's true: He's a Republican. It's his only flaw," Motz quipped.

In August 2018, Motz wrote a special concurrence when the panel majority found that the Constitution's Eighth Amendment did not prevent Virginia from criminally prohibiting those it identified as “habitual drunkards” from possessing alcohol, in which she argued the majority was ignoring Powell v. Texas (1968). In July 2019, the full circuit en banc reversed the panel by a vote of 8-7, with Motz now writing for the majority.

On December 3, 2021, Motz, writing for a unanimous panel (joined by Judges Wilkinson and Niemeyer), found that the Equal Pay Act requires equality in each pay type, not just the total. Motz wrote "Rather, the statute and the EEOC’s regulations make clear that an employer violates the Equal Pay Act if it pays female employees at a rate less than that of similarly situated male employees. A hypothetical illustrates the point: “As a matter of common sense, total remuneration cannot be the proper point of comparison. If it were, an employer who pays a woman $10 per hour and a man $20 per hour would not violate the [Equal Pay Act] . . . as long as the woman negated the obvious disparity by working twice as many hours.”"

Legal offices
New seat	Judge of the United States Court of Appeals for the Fourth Circuit; 1994–2022	Succeeded by Nicole Berner
