= James W. Dilley =

James W. Dilley is the Executive Director of the UCSF Alliance Health Project (formerly the AIDS Health Project), a mental health facility. He is a psychiatrist and an Associate Clinical Professor of Psychiatry at the University of California San Francisco. He is a pioneer in the field of developing responses to help with the mental health issues surrounding HIV. He has published on the issues of mental and physical health in the homosexual community and surrounding HIV. Dilley and other AHP colleagues developed a counseling approach for HIV risk reduction called Personalized Cognitive Counseling (PCC) which was recognized in 2010 by the Centers for Disease Control and Prevention (CDC) as an effective behavioral intervention. He was the 2016 recipient of the Adolf Meyer Award from the American Psychiatric Association.

== Education ==
He received his medical degree from the University of Missouri and completed his psychiatric residency at UCSF.

== Publications ==
- Face to Face: a guide to AIDS counseling
