= Allen Calvin =

American psychologist

Allen David Calvin
- Born: February 27, 1928 (age 98); Saint Paul, Minnesota, U.S.
- Citizenship: American
- Education: University of Minnesota (B.A.); University of Texas at Austin (Ph.D.)
- Occupation: Psychologist
- Employer(s): University of Minnesota; Michigan State University; Hollins College; Stanford University; University of San Francisco; Palo Alto University
- Known for: Experimental psychology, programmed instruction, educational technology
- Spouse: Dorothy Ver Strate (m. 1953)
- Children: 4
- Awards: Fellow of the American Psychological Association; Fellow of the Association for Psychological Science; Fellow of the American Association for the Advancement of Science

Allen David Calvin (born February 27, 1928) is an American psychologist, entrepreneur, and educator who served as the President of Palo Alto University from 1984 to 2016.

== Early life and education ==
Calvin was born in 1928 in Saint Paul, Minnesota. He was the oldest child of Carl and Zelda Calvin, and grew up with his younger brother, Stafford. He volunteered for the United States Navy in 1945 during World War II and served two years on active duty. He was then in the United States Naval Reserve through 1947. He received a B.A. in psychology in 1950 from the University of Minnesota, graduating summa cum laude. Calvin earned his Ph.D. in experimental psychology from the University of Texas at Austin in 1953.

== Career ==
Calvin's academic research focused on experimental psychology with an emphasis on the psychology of learning. After earning his doctorate, Calvin served as an instructor at Michigan State University from 1953 to 1954 and was hired at Hollins College as an assistant professor in 1955, becoming an associate professor in 1959. In 1960, he received two grants. One, from the Carnegie Foundation, financed a new laboratory to study the use of machines in teaching foreign language, a forerunner of modern computer-instruction techniques.

In 1961, he became director of the Britannica Center for Studies in Learning and Motivation at Stanford University.

From 1962 to 1974, he served as president of Behavioral Research Laboratories (BRL). BRL focused on programmed instruction materials for learners of all ages, including both children and adults, while also employing a phonetics-based approach to teaching children's literacy.

In 1974, Calvin joined the faculty of the University of San Francisco, serving as Dean of Education from 1974 to 1978 and as Henry Clay Hall Professor of Organization and Leadership from 1978 to 1983.

In 1984, he was appointed President of the Pacific Graduate School of Psychology (now Palo Alto University). Under his leadership, the institution gained accreditation from the Western Association of Schools and Colleges(WASC) and then developed several new programs, facilitating growth from around fifty students to around one thousand:

- In cooperation with Stanford University, The PAU-Stanford Psy.D. Consortium Program.
- In cooperation with De Anza College and the College of San Mateo, the PAU Bachelor's degree Program in Psychology & Social Action.
- In cooperation with Foothill College and the College of San Mateo, the PAU Bachelor's degree Program in Business Psychology.
- The Master of Arts Degree in Clinical Mental Health Counseling.

In 2009, Palo Alto University relocated, naming their new location the “Allen Calvin Campus.” He retired as president in 2016.

== Personal life ==
In 1953, he married Dorothy (née Ver Strate), and they would go on to be married for more than seventy years. They have four children and seven grandchildren. Calvin's cousin was Nobel prize-winning chemist Melvin Calvin, and California politician Matt Haney is Calvin's grandson.

== Awards and Societies ==
- Fellow of the American Psychological Association
- Fellow of the Association for Psychological Science
- Fellow of the American Association for the Advancement of Science

== Selected publications ==
- Calvin, A. D., & Holtzman, W. H. (1953). "Adjustment and the discrepancy between self concept and inferred self". Journal of Consulting Psychology, 17(1), 39–44. doi.org/10.1037/h0057727
- Calvin, A. D., Koons, P. B. Jr., Bingham, J. L., & Fink, H. H. (1955). "A further investigation of the relationship between manifest anxiety and intelligence". Journal of Consulting Psychology, 19(4), 280–282. doi.org/10.1037/h0045731
- Calvin, A. D., Hoffmann, F. K., & Harden, E. L. (1957). "The Effect of Intelligence and Social Atmosphere on Group Problem Solving Behavior". The Journal of Social Psychology, 45(1), 61–74. doi.org/10.1080/00224545.1957.9714286
- Igel, G. J., & Calvin, A. D. (1960). "The development of affectional responses in infant dogs". Journal of Comparative and Physiological Psychology, 53(3), 302–305. doi.org/10.1037/h0049308
- Calvin, A. D. (1969). Programmed Instruction: Bold New Venture. Indiana University Press. ISBN 978-0-6083-0289-8.
- Calvin, A. D. (Ed.). (1979). Challenges and alternatives to the American criminal justice system. University of San Francisco. ISBN 978-0-8357-0391-8.
- Calvin, A. D. (1981). "Unemployment among Black Youths, Demographics, and Crime". Crime & Delinquency, 27(2), 234–244. doi.org/10.1177/001112878102700206
