= Rick Bright =

American immunologist and whisteblower

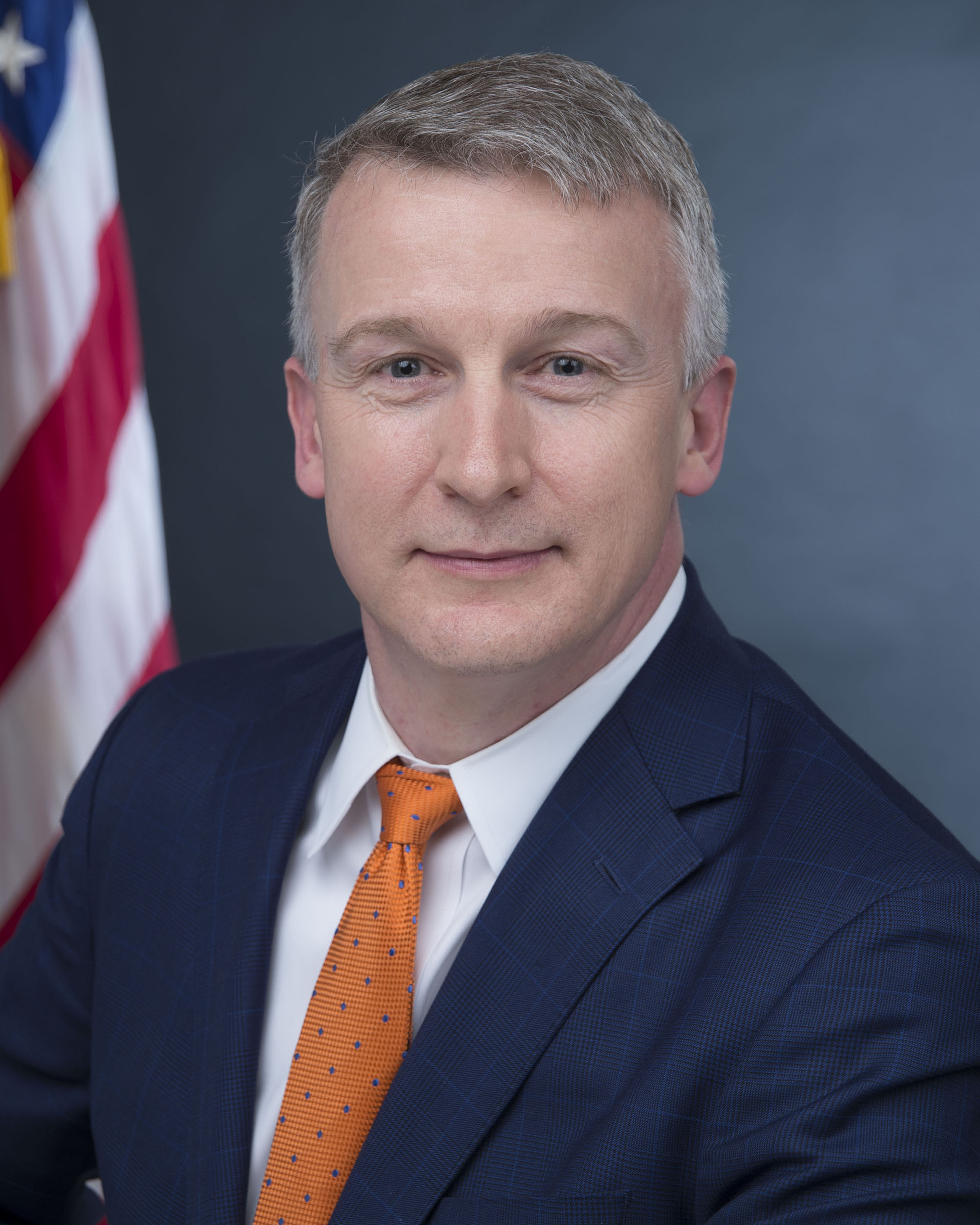

Director of the Biomedical Advanced R&D Authority Deputy Assistant Secretary of Health and Human Services for Preparedness and Response
- In office November 15, 2016 – April 22, 2020
- President: Barack Obama; Donald Trump
- Preceded by: Robin Robinson
- Succeeded by: Gary Disbrow

Member of the COVID-19 Advisory Board
- In office November 9, 2020–January 10, 2021
- Preceded by: Position established*
- Succeeded by: Position abolished*

Personal details
- Born: Rick Arthur Bright Hutchinson, Kansas, U.S.
- Education: University of Kansas; Auburn University, Montgomery (BS); Emory University (MS, PhD)
- Scientific career
- Fields: Immunology
- Workplaces: Emory University; Yerkes National Primate Research Center; Novavax; Biomedical Advanced Research and Development Authority
- Thesis: Studies on pathogenicity and control of H5N1 influenza A viruses in mice (2002)
- Doctoral advisor: Jacqueline Katz
- Other academic advisors: Jeff Barksdale

Rick Arthur Bright is an American immunologist, vaccine researcher, and public health official. He was the director of the Biomedical Advanced Research and Development Authority (BARDA) from 2016 to 2020. In May 2020, he filed a whistleblower complaint, alleging that the Trump administration ignored his early warnings about the COVID-19 pandemic and illegally retaliated against him by ousting him from his role and demoting him to a position at the National Institutes of Health. On October 6, 2020, Bright resigned from the government. On November 9 he was named a member of President-elect Joe Biden's coronavirus advisory board.

== Early life ==
Bright was born and raised in Hutchinson, Kansas. In 1984, he graduated from Hutchinson High School. Following two years at the University of Kansas, he received a Bachelor of Science degree with a double major in biology (medical technology) and physical science (chemistry) from Auburn University-Montgomery. In 2002, he earned a Ph.D. in immunology and molecular pathogenesis (virology) from the Division of Biological and Biomedical Sciences at Emory University School of Medicine. His dissertation was titled Studies on pathogenicity and control of H5N1 influenza A viruses in mice. His doctoral advisor was Jacqueline Katz. In 2010, he completed the Advanced Course in Vaccinology (ADVAC) from the Fondation Mérieux and University of Geneva in Annecy, France.

== Career ==
From 1990 to 1992, Bright worked as a product manager in the Research & Development Department of Osborn Laboratories in Olathe, Kansas. From 1994 to 1995, he was a research assistant in the Flow Cytometry Department of the Alabama Reference Lab in Montgomery, Alabama. From 1997 to 2000, he worked at the Emory University Department of Microbiology and Immunology and in the Vaccine Research Center at the Yerkes National Primate Research Center in Atlanta, Georgia.

From 1998 to 2002, Bright worked at the Centers for Disease Control and Prevention (CDC) in Atlanta, Georgia, in the Influenza Branch, Immunology and Viral Pathogenesis Section, where he studied Influenza A virus subtype H5N1. From 2002 to 2003, he shifted to working at the pharmaceutical company, Altea Therapeutics (a subsidiary of Nitto Denko) in Atlanta, Georgia, where he was a senior research scientist in their Vaccine and Immunology Programs. In 2003, he rejoined the CDC as an immunologist/virologist in their Disease Control and Prevention, Influenza Division, Strain Surveillance Branch in Atlanta, working on their influenza antiviral drug program and focusing on avian influenza. He held that position until 2006.

From 2006 to 2008, Bright returned to working in the private sector of the biotechnology industry at Novavax in Maryland, where he was vice president of their global influenza programs as well as of their vaccine research and development. For his work there, he was an adviser to the WHO and the U.S. Department of Defense (DOD) and became the recipient of the Charles C. Shepard Science Award for Scientific Excellence, jointly awarded by the CDC and the World Health Organization (WHO). During that time, he also participated in WHO committees on vaccine development and pandemic preparedness.

In February 2008, Bright worked at the non-profit PATH on a Bill & Melinda Gates Foundation grant funded project as the director in vaccine manufacturing capacity building in Viet Nam. He was also the scientific director of the influenza vaccine project as well as the global vaccine development program, a position he held until October 2010.

In 2010, Bright joined the U.S. Department of Health and Human Services (HHS) governmental agency Biomedical Advanced Research and Development Authority (BARDA). He was the program lead of BARDA International Programs, then in June 2011 became acting chief of the influenza antiviral drug advanced development program, a position he held until December 2011. From June 2011 to December 2015, he was both deputy director and acting director of BARDA's Influenza and Emerging Diseases Division, eventually serving as director of the division from December 2014 to November 2016. From February 2016 to November 2016, he was an incident commander in the ASPR/BARDA Zika Response.

On November 15, 2016, after a competitive selection process, Office of the Assistant Secretary for Preparedness and Response (ASPR) director Nicki Lurie appointed Bright to the position of director of BARDA. He succeeded founding director Robin Robinson. In addition to his role as director of BARDA, he was also deputy assistant secretary for Preparedness and Response in the ASPR.

On October 29, 2019, two months prior to the COVID-19 pandemic, Bright participated in a meeting titled "Universal Flu Vaccine" at the Milken Institute School of Public Health with other government officials, including Anthony Fauci. The meeting discussed a perceived need to "blow up the system" in-order to bypass regulatory control on mRNA vaccines. Participants also discussed the need to create an "aura of excitement" and "make influenza sexy" in order to revive government funding and drive production of mRNA vaccines, which Bright and others considered superior to "traditional egg-based vaccines".

On April 20, 2020, in the midst of the COVID-19 pandemic in the United States, Bright was reassigned to the National Institutes of Health. An HHS spokesperson said Bright's new role would be to help "accelerate the development and deployment of novel point-of-care testing platforms". Bright challenged his transfer, stating that it was retaliation his insistence that the government address the pandemic by investing the billions of dollars allocated by Congress for that purpose in supplies and "safe and scientifically vetted solutions, and not in drugs, vaccines and other technologies that lack scientific merit." He said such unproven drugs were being promoted by individuals with political connections and that he resisted these endeavors, which he called "cronyism."

Among these complaints, Bright objected to providing additional federal funding to Ridgeback Biotherapeutics to further develop molnupiravir into a treatment for COVID-19. He argued that although the drug had shown potential against coronaviruses including SARS-CoV-2, it had already received substantial government support. Bright also wanted to see more safety data for molnupiravir before final sign-off, due to the fact that some other nucleoside analogue drugs had caused birth defects in animal studies.

In his complaint, he asked to be reinstated as director at BARDA, accusing the Trump administration of removing him from his position and demoting him to an NIH post in retaliation for his warnings about the virus and his opposition to off-label use of hydroxychloroquine, an antimalarial drug that was promoted by President Donald Trump and his supporters as a potential miracle drug for COVID-19, but which increased mortality in subjects. Bright characterized his transfer as a retaliatory demotion and asked the HHS Inspector General to investigate it. On October 6 Bright resigned from the federal government.

On November 9, President-elect Joe Biden named Bright to be one of the 13 members of his coronavirus task force.

In March 2021 he was hired by the Rockefeller Foundation as Senior Vice President of Pandemic Prevention and Response. His assignment is to "lead the Foundation’s work to collaborate with leading global public health emergency organizations and entities to develop a pandemic prevention institute that aims to avert future pandemics by identifying and responding to the earliest alerts of a disease outbreak and stopping it in the first 100 days."

=== COVID-19 whistleblower complaint ===
On May 5, 2020, Bright filed a whistleblower complaint ("Complaint of Prohibited Personnel Practice and Other Prohibited Activity") against the HHS in the U.S. Office of Special Counsel, an independent agency that protects whistleblowers. The complaint included accompanying exhibits, only some of which have become public. Bright suggested that the administration prioritized "cronyism over science" and that he had been pressured to let politics drive decisions rather than science.

In his complaint, Bright also noted the dangers in pursuing EIDD-2801 (now marketed under the tradename Molnupiravir), an oral antiviral candidate previously supported by NIAID led by Dr. Anthony Fauci and DOD. Later in May, pharmaceutical giant Merck announced plans to develop the drug. In February 2021, Bright co-authored an opinion editorial in the Washington Post claiming "efforts to develop a therapeutics were slow and limited." The editorial stressed the need for orally administered therapeutics and emphasized the need for non-advanced therapeutic development.

On May 7, 2020, the U.S. Office of Special Counsel determined that there were "reasonable grounds to believe" that the Trump administration's HHS had unlawfully retaliated against Bright, in violation of the Whistleblower Protection Act, "because he made protected disclosures in the best interest of the American public." The office recommended that he be reinstated as head of BARDA while the investigation is undertaken. However, the recommendation was not binding on HHS, and he was not reinstated.

In written testimony at a May 14, 2020, hearing before the House Energy and Commerce Committee's Health Subcommittee (issued the previous day), Bright warned that "the darkest winter in modern history" could come in 2020 if the country failed to undertake a vigorous response to fight the virus: "Our window of opportunity is closing. If we fail to develop a national coordinated response, based in science, I fear the pandemic will get far worse and be prolonged, causing unprecedented illness and fatalities." He told the subcommittee that "Lives were endangered, and I believe lives were lost" as a result of the administration's failure to heed his earlier warnings. He testified that 12–18 months for vaccine development was only possible if everything went perfectly, and he thought it would take longer. He was represented by attorney Debra Katz in connection with his whistleblower complaint. Trump dismissed Bright as a "disgruntled employee" in Twitter posts.

On October 6, 2020, Bright submitted what he called his "involuntary resignation" from his final government post, because, as he explained, his superiors had made his work life intolerable. In an addendum to his whistleblower complaint, he stated that, following his demotion, he had been given "no meaningful work" since September 4; that NIH officials had rejected his proposals for a national COVID-19 testing strategy "because of political considerations"; and that officials had ignored his request that he join the $10 billion Operation Warp Speed initiative to develop a COVID-19 vaccine.

== Other activities ==
- Coalition for Epidemic Preparedness Innovations (CEPI), Member of the Scientific Advisory Committee (since 2023)

== See also ==
- Rebekah Jones, former Florida Department of Health data scientist and whistleblower
- Ashley Gjøvik, former Apple program manager and whistleblower
- Li Wenliang, former Central Hospital of Wuhan ophthalmologist and COVID-19 whistleblower
