= UCSF Alliance Health Project =

U.S. nonprofit organization

- Formation: 1984
- Purpose: Mental health and wellness for the LGBTQ and HIV communities
- Location: United States
- Key people: James Dilley, MD (Emeritus Founding Executive Director) Will Hua, PhD (Director)
- Website: alliancehealthproject.ucsf.edu

The UCSF Alliance Health Project (AHP), formerly the AIDS Health Project, is a 501(c)(3) nonprofit organization that provides mental health and wellness services for the HIV/AIDS and LGBTQ communities in San Francisco. It is part of the University of California, San Francisco Department of Psychiatry. In addition to direct service to individuals, it also undertakes HIV prevention and LGBTQ mental health research and educates mental health and health care providers about best practices.

AHP describes its mission as, "to support the mental health and wellness of the lesbian, gay, bisexual, transgender, and queer (LGBTQ) and HIV-affected communities in constructing healthy and meaningful lives." It has 100 part and full-time staff and serves more than 6500 clients each year. Its budget is approximately $7 million per year. As a program of the University of California, AHP's governing board is the Regents, but for 22 years, AHP has constituted a Community Advisory Board, which meets monthly to advise the AHP Executive Committee on community needs and program development.

== History ==
In 1984, a group of mental health providers, including emeritus Founding Executive Director James Dilley, founded the AIDS Health Project at San Francisco General Hospital. At that time, AHP focused on mental health support for people living with AIDS and prevention counseling for gay men. In 1985, after the HIV antibody test became available, AHP developed and implemented a pre- and post-test counseling protocol, which became a model for HIV testing in the United States and internationally. AHP's was the world's first high volume HIV counseling and testing program. It also pioneered mobile HIV testing and in June 2013 expanded its reach with a dedicated mobile testing van.

Since then, AHP's work has grown to include a large range of mental health crisis services, support groups, therapeutic programs, and substance abuse counseling. After New Leaf, San Francisco's LGBT mental health clinic, closed, AHP expanded its mission to provide non-HIV, as well as HIV-related, mental health and wellness services for the entire LGBTQ community. In September 2010, the organization changed its name to Alliance Health Project to reflect this broadening of the organization's focus.

In 2012, Dilley was awarded the Levi Strauss & Co. Pioneer Award for his work with AHP. He also received the UCSF Chancellor's Award for Public Service in 2013 and was named as the 2016 recipient of the American Psychiatric Association's Adolf Meyer Award.

== Programs ==
The Alliance Health Project currently offers these programs: HIV counseling and testing; crisis and triage services; substance abuse counseling and case management services; psychosocial support and prevention services; and psychiatry and medication management. AHP is the primary trainer of HIV test counselors in programs funded by the California Department of Public Health. AHP also conducts original research, offers trainings for HIV providers, and publishes a national newsletter for HIV test counselors, Perspectives. AHP's Research Program developed one of the most widely implemented evidence-based interventions, designated a high-impact prevention (HIP) intervention by the U.S. Centers for Disease Control and Prevention. The intervention, Personalized Cognitive Counseling, is one of only two CDC-approved single-session HIV prevention counseling intervention.

== Publications ==
AHP has produced more than 20 books and newsletters on psychosocial and counseling issues relevant to the LGBTQ and HIV communities. The following are some of AHP's publications:

- PERSPECTIVES – the first national newsletter for HIV test counselors (1991 – present)
- FOCUS: A Guide to AIDS Research and Counseling – the longest running HIV-related mental health publication (1985 – 2010)
- Five-volume UCSF AIDS Health Project Monograph Series
- The UCSF AIDS Health Project Guide to Counseling (1998)
- Risk and Recovery: AIDS, HIV and Alcohol (1992)
- Face to Face: A Guide to AIDS Counseling (1989)
- Working with AIDS: A Resource Guide for Mental Health Professionals (1987)
- AIDS and Substance Abuse: A Training Manual for Health Care Professionals (1987)

== Art for AIDS ==
Art for AIDS is AHP's annual fundraiser. The first Art for AIDS took place in 1996, when a group of artists decided to sell their art to benefit their friends living with HIV/AIDS. The event has grown since, and now features a live auction and silent auctions of both art and gift certificates. In 2013, the event raised $275,000 from more than 800 attendees. It included notable artists such as Hung Liu, Jock Sturges, Squeak Carnwath, David Smith Harrison, Leonard Baskin, Sue Averall, Rex Ray, Martine Jardel, Michal Venera, and Kristine Mays.
