= Christine Blasey Ford =

American professor of psychology (born 1966)

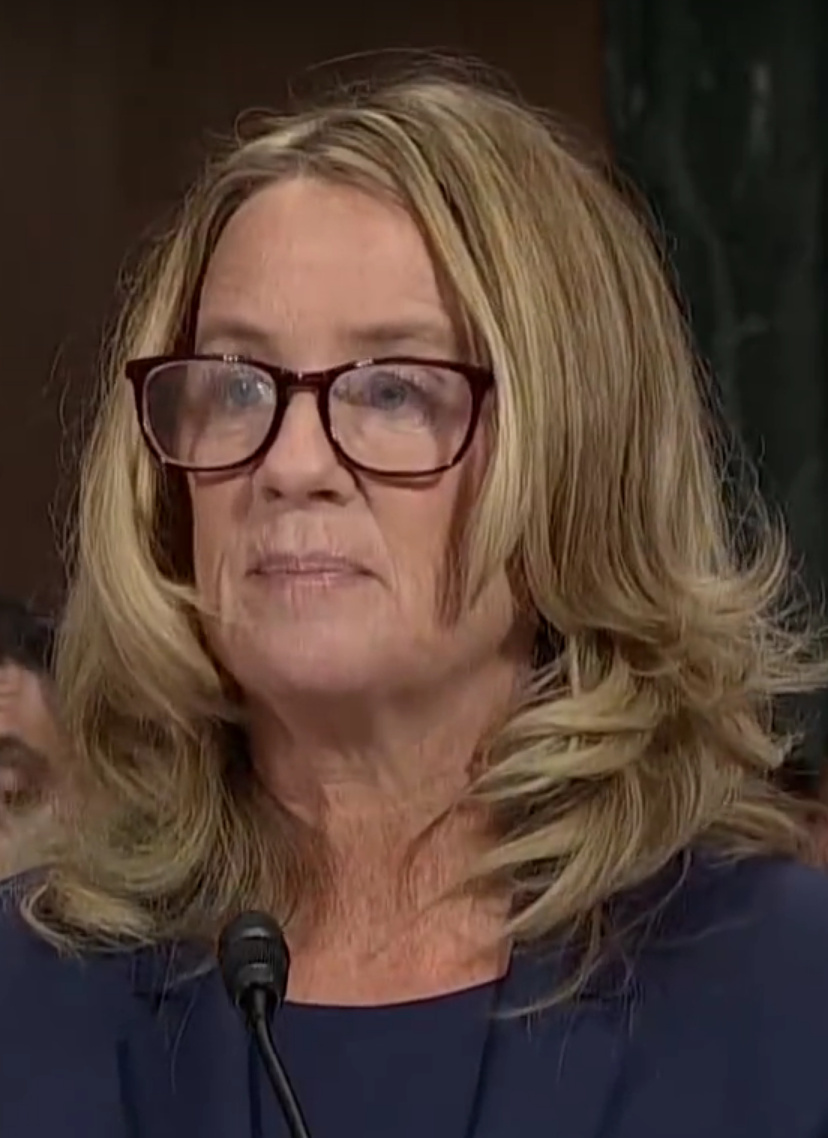
- Ford in 2018
- Born: Christine Margaret Blasey; November 1966 (age 59–60)
- Education: University of North Carolina at Chapel Hill (BA); Pepperdine University (PsyM); University of Southern California (PhD); Stanford University (MS)
- Occupation: College professor
- Spouse: Russell Ford (m. 2002)
- Children: 2
- Relatives: Bridgit Mendler (niece)
- Scientific career
- Fields: Psychology
- Workplaces: Stanford University School of Medicine; Palo Alto University
- Thesis: Measuring young children's coping responses to interpersonal conflict (1995)
- Doctoral advisor: Michael D. Newcomb

Christine Margaret Blasey Ford (née Blasey; /ˈblɑːzi/ BLAH-zee; born November 1966) is an American professor of psychology at Palo Alto University and a research psychologist at the Stanford University School of Medicine. She specializes in designing statistical models for research projects. During her academic career, Ford has worked as a professor at the Stanford University School of Medicine Collaborative Clinical Psychology Program.

In September 2018, Ford claimed that then-U.S. Supreme Court nominee Brett Kavanaugh had sexually assaulted her in Bethesda, Maryland, when they were teenagers in the summer of 1982. She testified about her allegations during a Senate Judiciary Committee hearing regarding Kavanaugh's Supreme Court nomination later that month.

== Early life ==
Ford grew up in the suburbs of Washington, D.C. Her parents are Paula K. and Ralph G. Blasey Jr., registered Republicans. She has two brothers, Tom and Ralph III.

From 1978 through 1984, she attended the Holton-Arms School, a private, all-girls university-preparatory school in Bethesda, Maryland. While on her regional sports team for diving, she accompanied diver Greg Louganis on a trip to the White House to discuss the 1980 Summer Olympics boycott.

She earned an undergraduate degree in experimental psychology in 1988 from the University of North Carolina at Chapel Hill. She received a master's degree in clinical psychology from Pepperdine University in 1991. In 1996, she received a PhD in educational psychology from the University of Southern California. Her 1995 dissertation was entitled Measuring Young Children's Coping Responses to Interpersonal Conflict. In 2009, she earned a master's degree in epidemiology, with a focus on the subject of biostatistics, from Stanford University School of Medicine.

== Career ==
Ford has worked in the academic and private sector as a biostatistician and research psychologist. Since 1998, she has worked as a research psychologist and biostatistician in the Stanford School of Medicine psychiatry department. Since 2011, she has been a psychology professor in the PGSP-Stanford Consortium for Clinical Psychology, a collaborative program between Palo Alto University and Stanford.

Ford teaches subjects including psychometrics, study methodologies, clinical trials, and statistics to doctoral students and serves on dissertation committees. She has also performed consulting work for multiple pharmaceutical companies. She formerly worked as a director of biostatistics at Corcept Therapeutics, and as a biostatistical consultant for Titan Pharmaceuticals, and Brain Resource. She has collaborated with FDA, academic and industry statisticians, including leading roundtable discussions at the American Statistical Association's Annual FDA-Industry meetings that focus on statistical analyzes in industry-FDA interactions. She is widely published within her field.

Ford "specializes in designing statistical models for research projects in order to make sure they come to accurate conclusions", as summarized by Helena Chmura Kraemer, a Stanford professor emeritus in biostatistics who co-authored a book and several articles with Ford. Ford has written or co-written several books about psychological topics, including depression. Her other research topics published in academic journal articles have included child abuse and the September 11 attacks. In 2015, she co-authored a book titled How Many Subjects? Statistical Power Analysis in Research. Her research into the social impact of hiding one's sexual orientation was published in 2016 in the journal Behavior Therapy, and reviewed by psychologist William Gibson of the American Psychological Association, who found their research "demonstrates that issues of identity have relevance to mental health outcomes in ways that much of previous work misses."

== Sexual assault allegation against Brett Kavanaugh ==
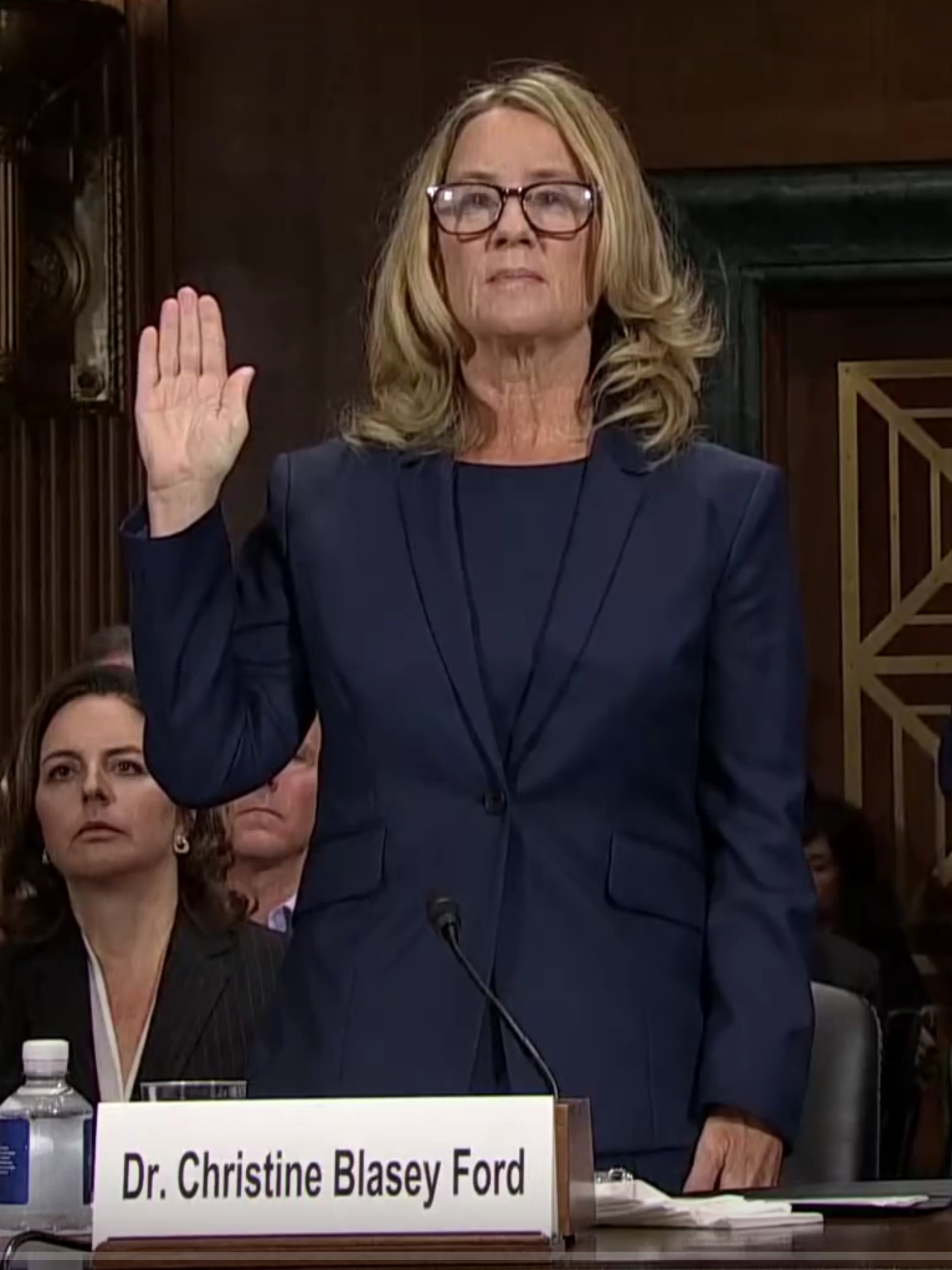
Ford being sworn in

Ford's written testimony

In early July 2018, after Judge Brett Kavanaugh was reported to be on Donald Trump's shortlist to become an Associate Justice of the Supreme Court of the United States, Ford contacted both The Washington Post and her congresswoman, Anna Eshoo. On July 20, eleven days after Trump nominated Kavanaugh, Eshoo met with Ford, becoming convinced of her credibility and noting that Ford seemed "terrified" that her identity as an accuser might become public. Eshoo and Ford decided to take the matter to Senator Dianne Feinstein, one of Ford's senators in California and the ranking Democrat on the Senate Judiciary Committee, which would deliberate Kavanaugh's nomination. In a July 30, 2018 letter to Feinstein, Ford alleged that Kavanaugh had sexually assaulted her when both were in high school in Bethesda, Maryland, and stated that she expected her story to be kept confidential. In August that year, Ford took a polygraph test that was administered by a former FBI agent, who concluded Ford was being truthful when attesting to the accuracy of her allegations.

Feinstein said that owing to her confidentiality commitment to Ford, she did not raise the issue in the initial Kavanaugh confirmation proceedings. On September 12, The Intercept reported (without naming Ford) that Feinstein was withholding a Kavanaugh-related document from fellow Judiciary Committee Democrats. On September 13, Feinstein referred Ford's letter to the FBI, which redacted Ford's name and forwarded the letter to the White House as an update to Kavanaugh's background check. The White House in turn sent the letter to the full Senate Judiciary Committee.

Senator Dick Durbin asks Ford about her certainty of Brett Kavanaugh's identity in the alleged 1982 attack.

On September 16, after media reported anonymous allegations and reporters started to track down her identity, Ford went public. Ford said she had wrestled with the choice to make her identity known, weighing the potential negative impact it could have on her, but ultimately spoke to The Washington Post, alleging that Kavanaugh had sexually assaulted her in the summer of 1982 when she was 15 and he was 17. She said that, while his friend Mark Judge watched, Kavanaugh, intoxicated, held her down on a bed with his body, grinding against and groping her, covering her mouth when she tried to scream and trying to pull her clothes off. Finding it hard to breathe, she thought Kavanaugh was going to accidentally kill her. She recounted escaping when Judge jumped on the bed and toppled them. As corroboration of her account, Ford provided the Post with the polygraph results as well as session notes from her couples therapist written in 2012.

The therapist's notes do not name Kavanaugh but record Ford's claim of being attacked by students "from an elitist boys' school" who went on to become "highly respected and high-ranking members of society in Washington". The therapist's notes also say four boys were involved, which Ford attributed to an error by the therapist; Ford clarified in 2018 that four boys were at the party but only two were involved in the incident. Ford's husband recalled that she had used Kavanaugh's last name in her 2012 description of the incident, and that she said he might one day be nominated to the Supreme Court. In an individual therapy session in 2013, Ford described a "rape attempt" that occurred in her late teens.

Kavanaugh denied Ford's allegations. Attorneys Debra Katz, Lisa Banks and Michael Bromwich represented Ford pro bono in the process of going public with her statements about Kavanaugh. Democratic adviser Ricki Seidman, who helped prepare Anita Hill for her testimony against Clarence Thomas during his 1991 Supreme Court nomination hearings, was brought in to personally advise Ford in navigating a potential hearing.

On September 18, Ford's attorneys sent a letter to Senate Judiciary Chairman Chuck Grassley requesting that the FBI investigate the incident before the Senate held a hearing on Ford's allegations to "ensure that the crucial facts and witnesses in this matter are assessed in a non-partisan manner, and that the Committee is fully informed before conducting any hearing or making any decisions". The letter additionally noted the significant public support Ford had received, but also severe harassment including death threats, forcing her to leave her home. The same day, a crowdfunding campaign was created to defray Ford's security costs, surpassing its $100,000 goal in less than 24 hours.

On September 21, President Trump tweeted about Ford, saying that if Ford's allegations were true, either she or her parents would have reported them at the time of the event. Fortune called the tweet an attempt "to undermine her allegation" and Republican Senator Susan Collins—at the time considered a key swing vote on Kavanaugh's nomination—said she was "appalled" by Trump's tweet, calling it "inappropriate and wrong". Trump's statements about Ford prompted sexual assault victims to start tweeting using the hashtag #WhyIDidntReport to share reasons for silence. Trump issued several more statements, including a tweet alleging that Kavanaugh was "under assault by radical left wing politicians". Trump's attacks on Ford were widely characterized by his critics as victim blaming.

On September 27, the Senate Judiciary Committee held an additional day of public hearings to discuss her allegations. Ford and Kavanaugh were the only witnesses scheduled. Ford testified that Kavanaugh "groped me and tried to take off my clothes", and that "I believed he was going to rape me." Kavanaugh had previously denied all allegations of sexual assault as "totally false and outrageous" and testified separately later in the day. Republican members of the committee did not question Ford directly; that was done by Rachel Mitchell, a career prosecutor from Arizona retained by the committee's Republican majority to question Ford on their behalf. Alternating with Mitchell's questions, Democratic committee members questioned Ford themselves.

Following the hearing, Mitchell produced a report stating that she did not believe a reasonable prosecutor would bring a case against Kavanaugh based on the evidence presented to the committee and adding that there were multiple inconsistencies in Ford's testimony. Mitchell asserted that Ford's case was "even weaker than" the standard "he said, she said" case, because other witnesses identified by Ford "either refuted her allegations, or failed to corroborate them".

In response to Mitchell's memo detailing her conclusions, several former prosecutors and legal analysts published rebuttals, arguing that Mitchell erred in questioning Ford without there having been an impartial and full investigation. Others noted that Mitchell's role was "akin to [that of] a defense attorney", and therefore she should not have submitted a prosecution report. Two MSNBC legal analysts characterized Mitchell's assertions that Ford had "no memory of key details" and that others had not corroborated her account as flawed arguments, even going so far as to describe Mitchell's conclusions as "reek[ing] of desperation" and "misleading at best and disingenuous at worst".

On September 28, following requests from U.S. Senator Jeff Flake and from the Senate Judiciary Committee, President Trump ordered a supplemental FBI background investigation into Kavanaugh, giving them one week to investigate the sexual assault allegations. On October 4, the FBI submitted the confidential report to the Senate; Judiciary Committee Chairman Chuck Grassley (R-Iowa) said there was nothing new in the report and no corroboration of the allegations. Senate Republicans were generally approving of how the investigation was conducted; Senate Democrats criticized the investigation as "limited" and "incomplete." The FBI interviewed 10 additional witnesses during the investigation, including Deborah Ramirez, another woman who had accused Kavanaugh of sexual assault; they did not interview Kavanaugh or Ford.

On October 5, Ford's attorneys said she had no regrets about coming forward, and did not want Kavanaugh impeached if Democrats took control of Congress. The Senate confirmed Kavanaugh's nomination by a vote of 50–48 on October 6, 2018.

By the time it was closed to further donations, the GoFundMe account set up on Ford's behalf had raised $647,610. As of November 21, 2018, Ford had used some of the money to cover security costs to protect herself and her family, but said that she would donate the remainder to organizations that support trauma survivors.

Ford received a number of threats – including death threats – for coming forward with her allegations against Kavanaugh. During her testimony, Ford stated, "I have been called the most vile and hateful names imaginable. People have posted my personal information on the internet. This has resulted in additional emails, calls, and threats. My family and I were forced to move out of our home." As of November 2018, Ford stated that she was still being harassed and threatened and had to move four times as well as hire private security; furthermore, she had not been able to resume her teaching at Palo Alto University.

In their 2019 book The Education of Brett Kavanaugh: An Investigation, authors Robin Pogrebin and Kate Kelly interviewed Leland Keyser, a close friend of Ford's from high school, who, according to Ford, was at the party where the alleged assault took place (although not in the same room). Keyser initially stated through her attorney that while she did not recall the evening in question, she believed Ford, but in a later interview she stated that she no longer does. The interview revealed that Keyser, who is a Democrat, had felt pressured earlier to corroborate Ford's account. According to Keyser, Ford and other friends threatened to spread stories of Keyser's "addictive tendencies" and other personal issues if Keyser did not change her account to corroborate Ford.

== Recognition ==
The Wing, a co-working network and club for women, named a conference room in its San Francisco location after Ford. In November 2018, a GoFundMe started by Georgetown Law professor Heidi Li Feldman raised $30,000 towards endowing a professorship or scholarship in Ford's name. That same year, Time magazine included Ford on its shortlist for Person of the Year. On December 11, 2018, Ford presented the Sports Illustrated "Inspiration of the Year" award to Rachael Denhollander. In 2019, she was named one of that year's 100 most influential people in Time 100, having been nominated by then-Senator Kamala Harris.

Additionally, Ford has been nominated for a University of North Carolina at Chapel Hill Distinguished Alumna Award for "speaking truth to power" when she went public with her sexual assault allegations against Kavanaugh.

== Personal life ==
Before coming forward with allegations against Kavanaugh, Ford lived in Palo Alto, California, with her husband Russell Ford—they wed in 2002—and their two sons. Since coming forward, she says that she has moved multiple times.

Ford is a registered Democrat who has made contributions to political organizations. In 2017, she participated in a local Women's March protesting President Trump and attended a March for Science in San Francisco to protest the first Trump administration's cuts to research.

== Selected works ==
=== Books ===
- Kraemer, Helena Chmura; Blasey, Christine (2015). How Many Subjects?: Statistical Power Analysis in Research (2nd ed.). Los Angeles: Sage Publications. ISBN 978-1-4833-1955-1. OCLC 980879167.
- Blasey, Christine (2024). One Way Back: A Memoir. New York: St. Martin's. ISBN 978-1-2502-8965-0. OCLC 1398463707.

=== Book chapters ===
- Blasey, Christine; Belanoff, Joseph K.; DeBattista, Charles; Shatzberg, Alan F. (2013). "Adult Psychopharmacology". In Koocher, Gerald; Norcross, John C.; Greene, Beverly A. (eds.). Psychologists' Desk Reference: Third Edition. Oxford University Press. ISBN 978-0199845491.
- Blasey, Christine; Saxena, Kirti (March 29, 2004). Steiner, Hans (ed.). Handbook of Mental Health Interventions in Children and Adolescents: An Integrated Developmental Approach (1st ed.). Jossey-Bass. ISBN 978-0787961541.

=== Journal articles ===
- Blasey, Christine M.; DeBattista, Charles; Roe, Robert; Block, Thaddeus; Belanoff, Joseph K. (July 2009). "A multisite trial of mifepristone for the treatment of psychotic depression: A site-by-treatment interaction". Contemporary Clinical Trials. 30 (4): 284–288. doi:10.1016/j.cct.2009.03.001. PMID 19318138.
- Blasey, C. M.; Block, T. S.; Belanoff, J. K.; Roe, R. L. (2011). "Efficacy and Safety of Mifepristone for the Treatment of Psychotic Depression". Journal of Clinical Psychopharmacology. 31 (4): 436–440. doi:10.1097/JCP.0b013e3182239191. PMID 21694614. S2CID 24302102.
- Blasey, Christine; McLain, Carina; Belanoff, Joseph (2013). "Trough Plasma Concentrations of Mifepristone Correlate with Psychotic Symptom Reductions: A Review of Three Randomized Clinical Trials". Current Psychiatry Reviews. 9 (2): 148–154. doi:10.2174/1573400511309020009.
- Kraemer, Helena C.; Blasey, Christine M. (August 2004). "Centring in regression analyses: a strategy to prevent errors in statistical inference". International Journal of Methods in Psychiatric Research. 13 (3): 141–151. doi:10.1002/mpr.170. PMC 6878533. PMID 15297898.
- Manber, Rachel; Schnyer, Rosa N.; Allen, John J.B.; Rush, A. John; Blasey, Christine M. (2004). "Acupuncture: a promising treatment for depression during pregnancy". Journal of Affective Disorders. 83 (1): 89–95. doi:10.1016/j.jad.2004.05.009. PMID 15546651.
