= Kathleen Neuzil =

American medical researcher

Kathleen Maletic Neuzil
- Education: University of Maryland, College Park; Johns Hopkins University
- Awards: Elected to the National Academy of Medicine
- Scientific career
- Workplaces: University of Maryland School of Medicine; University of Washington School of Medicine

Kathleen Maletic Neuzil is the Director of the Center for Vaccine Development at the University of Maryland School of Medicine. She was elected to the National Academy of Medicine in 2019.

== Early life and education ==
Neuzil studied zoology at the University of Maryland, College Park and graduated summa cum laude in 1983. She was a medical student at Johns Hopkins University, where she was a member of Alpha Omega Alpha. She completed her residency at Vanderbilt University, where she specialised in internal medicine in 1987. She was made a Fellow in infectious disease at Vanderbilt University in 1991. After completing her fellowship, Neuzil started a Master of public health and graduated in 1998.

== Research and career ==
Neuzil works on vaccine development and policy. After her fellowship Neuzil joined the University of Washington School of Medicine, where she served as Director of PATH's Influenza Vaccine Development Project. PATH is a Seattle-based nonprofit global health organisation, where Neuzil worked on the rotavirus, human papillomavirus infection (HPV) and Japanese encephalitis vaccines. In 2008, Neuzil partnered with Lentigen Corporation to research the pandemic influenza vaccine. Their early work considered the development of Influenza A virus subtype H1N1 and H5N1 virus-like particle pandemic influenza vaccines. Virus-like particle vaccines offer immunogenic, strain-specific recombinant antigens that can be produced at scale. In 2008 Neuzil was made Chair of the Infectious Diseases Society of America Pandemic Influenza Task Force.

In 2015, Neuzil joined the University of Maryland School of Medicine.

At the Center for Vaccine Development, Neuzil has developed and deployed vaccines to protect against a range of diseases including typhoid fever, shigellosis, malaria and cholera. She has also considered emerging pathogens such as the Zika and Ebola viruses. The center is also part of the Typhoid Vaccine Acceleration Consortium (TyVAC), a collaboration between the Oxford Vaccine Group, University of Maryland School of Medicine Center for Vaccine Development. The typhoid conjugate vaccine created by TyVAC was demonstrated as a cost-effective strategy to protect people in low- and middle-income countries from typhoid. In 2018, phase 2 clinical trials began on the Influenza A virus subtype H7N9 vaccine.

In 2019, Neuzil and the Center for Vaccine Development at the University of Maryland School of Medicine announced a seven-year $200 million contract with the National Institute of Allergy and Infectious Diseases. The research program tests seasonal influenza vaccines and features clinical trials with populations including pregnant women, children and the elderly. She has spoken about the need for the public to have an influenza vaccine (flu shot), ideally by the end of October.

Alongside her academic positions, Neuzil serves on the World Health Organization Strategic Advisory Group of Experts on Immunization (SAGE) and previously on the advisory group of the Centers for Disease Control and Prevention (CDC). Dr. Neuzil is central to the domestic and global response to COVID-19. As a Co-PI of the NIH-funded Leadership Group for the Vaccine & Treatment Evaluation Unit Network, Dr. Neuzil is part of the strategic team evaluating COVID-19 vaccines and therapeutics in the US.

=== Awards and honours ===
Her awards and honours include:

- 2016 Vanderbilt University School of Medicine Distinguished Alumni award
- 2018 Top 100 Women in Maryland
- 2019 Elected to the National Academy of Medicine
- 2019 awarded The Myron M. Levine, MD, DTPH, Professor in Vaccinology (Endowed Professorship), University of Maryland School of Medicine
- 2020 Fierce Pharma "The 22 Most Influential People in the Fight Against COVID-19"
- 2020 Baltimore Sun Marylander of the Year Awardee for Unprecedented Leadership on COVID-19 Vaccines Research and Treatment
- 2021 Sonia Skarlatos Public Service Award from the American Society of Gene & Cell Therapy
- 2021 Annual Boy Scouts of Central Maryland Health Services Leadership Award for Outstanding Service

== Selected publications ==
- Zaman, K; Sack, DA; Neuzil, KM; Yunus, M; Moulton, LH; Sugimoto, JD; Fleming, JA; Hossain, I; Arifeen, SE; Azim, T; Rahman, M; Lewis, KDC; Feller, AJ; Qadri, F; Halloran, ME; Cravioto, A; Victor, JC (2017). "Effectiveness of a live oral human rotavirus vaccine after programmatic introduction in Bangladesh: A cluster-randomized trial". PLOS Med. 14 (4) e1002282. doi:10.1371/journal.pmed.1002282. PMC 5395158. PMID 28419095.
- Armah, GE; Sow, SO; Breiman, RF; Dallas, MJ; Tapia, MD; Feikin, DR; Binka, FN; Steele, AD; Laserson, KF; Ansah, NA; Levine, MM; Lewis, K; Coia, ML; Attah-Poku, M; Ojwando, J; Rivers, SB; Victor, JC; Nyambane, G; Hodgson, A; Schödel, F; Ciarlet, M; Neuzil, KM (2010). "Efficacy of pentavalent rotavirus vaccine against severe rotavirus gastroenteritis in infants in developing countries in sub-Saharan Africa: a randomised, double-blind, placebo-controlled trial". Lancet. 376 (9741): 606–14. doi:10.1016/S0140-6736(10)60889-6. PMID 20692030..
- Madhi, SA; Cunliffe, NA; Steele, D; Witte, D; Kirsten, M; Louw, C; Ngwira, B; Victor, JC; Gillard, PH; Cheuvart, BB; Han, HH; Neuzil, KM (2010). "Effect of human rotavirus vaccine on severe diarrhea in African infants". N Engl J Med. 362 (4): 289–98. doi:10.1056/NEJMoa0904797. PMC 5117000. PMID 20107214..
- Steele, AD; Patel, M; Parashar, UD; Victor, JC; Aguado, T; Neuzil, KM (2009). "Rotavirus vaccines for infants in developing countries in Africa and Asia: considerations from a World Health Organization-sponsored consultation". J Infect Dis. 200 (Suppl 1): S63–9. doi:10.1086/605042. PMID 19817616.
- Patel, PD; Patel, P; Liang, Y; Meiring, JE; Misiri, T; Mwakiseghile, F; Tracy, JK; Masesa, C; Msuku, H; Banda, D; Mbewe, M; Henrion, M; Adetunji, F; Simiyu, K; Rotrosen, E; Birkhold, M; Nampota, N; Nyirenda, OM; Kotloff, K; Gmeiner, M; Dube, Q; Kawalazira, G; Laurens, MB; Heyderman, RS; Gordon, MA; Neuzil, KM (2021). "Safety and Efficacy of a Typhoid Conjugate Vaccine in Malawian Children". N Engl J Med. 385 (12): 1104–1115. doi:10.1056/NEJMoa2035916. PMC 8202713. PMID 34525285.
- Birkhold, M.; Coulibaly, Y.; Coulibaly, O.; Dembele, P.; Kim, D.; Sow, S.; Neuzil, KM (2020). "Morbidity and Mortality of Typhoid Intestinal Perforation Among Children in Sub-Saharan Africa 1995–2019: A Scoping Review". World J Surg. 44 (9): 2892–2902. doi:10.1007/s00268-020-05567-2. PMC 7236653. PMID 32430740.
- Qadri, F; Khanam, F; Liu, X; Theiss-Nyland, K; Biswas, PK; Bhuiyan, AI; Ahmmed, F; Colin-Jones, R; Smith, N; Tonks, S; Voysey, M; Mujadidi, YF; Mazur, O; Rajib, NH; Hossen, MI; Ahmed, SU; Khan, A; Rahman, N; Babu, G; Greenland, M; Kelly, S; Ireen, M; Islam, K; O'Reilly, P; Scherrer, KS; Pitzer, VE; Neuzil, KM; Zaman, K; Pollard, AJ; Clemens, JD (2021). "Protection by vaccination of children against typhoid fever with a Vi-tetanus toxoid conjugate vaccine in urban Bangladesh: a cluster-randomised trial". Lancet. 398 (10301): 675–684. doi:10.1016/S0140-6736(21)01124-7. PMC 8387974. PMID 34384540..
- Shakya, M; Voysey, M; Theiss-Nyland, K; Colin-Jones, R; Pant, D; Adhikari, A; Tonks, S; Mujadidi, YF; O'Reilly, P; Mazur, O; Kelly, S; Liu, X; Maharjan, A; Dahal, A; Haque, N; Pradhan, A; Shrestha, S; Joshi, M; Smith, N; Hill, J; Clarke, J; Stockdale, L; Jones, E; Lubinda, T; Bajracharya, B; Dongol, S; Karkey, A; Baker, S; Dougan, G; Pitzer, VE; Neuzil, KM; Shrestha, S; Basnyat, B; Pollard, AJ (2021). "Efficacy of typhoid conjugate vaccine in Nepal: final results of a phase 3, randomised, controlled trial". Lancet Glob Health. 9 (11): e1561–e1568. doi:10.1016/S2214-109X(21)00346-6. PMC 8551681. PMID 34678198.
- Deming, ME; Michael, NL; Robb, M; Cohen, MS; Neuzil, KM (2020). "Accelerating Development of SARS-CoV-2 Vaccines - The Role for Controlled Human Infection Models". N Engl J Med. 383 (10): e63. doi:10.1056/NEJMp2020076. PMC 7968616. PMID 32610006..
- Mehrotra, DV; Janes, HE; Fleming, TR; Annunziato, PW; Neuzil, KM; Carpp, LN; Benkeser, D; Brown, ER; Carone, M; Cho, I; Donnell, D; Fay, MP; Fong, Y; Han, S; Hirsch, I; Huang, Y; Huang, Y; Hyrien, O; Juraska, M; Luedtke, A; Nason, M; Vandebosch, A; Zhou, H; Cohen, MS; Corey, L; Hartzel, J; Follmann, D; Gilbert, PB (2021). "Clinical Endpoints for Evaluating Efficacy in COVID-19 Vaccine Trials". Ann Intern Med. 174 (2): 221–228. doi:10.7326/M20-6169. PMC 7596738. PMID 33090877..
- Rapaka, RR; Hammershaimb, EA; Neuzil, KM (2022). "Are Some COVID-19 Vaccines Better Than Others? Interpreting and Comparing Estimates of Efficacy in Vaccine Trials". Clin Infect Dis. 74 (2): 352–358. doi:10.1093/cid/ciab213. PMC 7989512. PMID 33693552..
- Follmann, D; Fintzi, J; Fay, MP; Janes, HE; Baden, LR; El Sahly, HM; Fleming, TR; Mehrotra, DV; Carpp, LN; Juraska, M; Benkeser, D; Donnell, D; Fong, Y; Han, S; Hirsch, I; Huang, Y; Huang, Y; Hyrien, O; Luedtke, A; Carone, M; Nason, M; Vandebosch, A; Zhou, H; Cho, I; Gabriel, E; Kublin, JG; Cohen, MS; Corey, L; Gilbert, PB; Neuzil, KM (2021). "A Deferred-Vaccination Design to Assess Durability of COVID-19 Vaccine Effect After the Placebo Group Is Vaccinated". Ann Intern Med. 174 (8): 1118–1125. doi:10.7326/M20-8149. PMC 8099035. PMID 33844575..
- Neuzil, KM; Mellen, BG; Wright, PF; Mitchel, EF Jr; Griffin, MR (2000). "The effect of influenza on hospitalizations, outpatient visits, and courses of antibiotics in children". N Engl J Med. 342 (4): 225–31. doi:10.1056/NEJM200001273420401. PMID 10648763..
- Neuzil, KM; Reed, GW; Mitchel, EF Jr; Griffin, MR (1999). "Influenza-associated morbidity and mortality in young and middle-aged women". JAMA. 281 (10): 901–7. doi:10.1001/jama.281.10.901. PMID 10078486..
- King, JC Jr; Stoddard, JJ; Gaglani, MJ; Moore, KA; Magder, L; McClure, E; Rubin, JD; Englund, JA; Neuzil, K (2006). "Effectiveness of school-based influenza vaccination". N Engl J Med. 355 (24): 2523–32. doi:10.1056/NEJMoa055414. PMID 17167135..
- Englund, JA; Walter, EB; Fairchok, MP; Monto, AS (Apr 2005). "Neuzil KM. A comparison of 2 influenza vaccine schedules in 6- to 23-month-old children". Pediatrics. 115 (4): 1039–47. doi:10.1542/peds.2004-2373. PMID 15805382.
- Lewis, KDC; Ortiz, JR; Rahman, MZ; Levine, MZ; Rudenko, L; Wright, PF; Katz, JM; Dally, L; Rahman, M; Isakova-Sivak, I; Ilyushina, NA; Matyushenko, V; Fry, AM; Lindstrom, SE; Bresee, JS; Brooks, WA; Neuzil, KM (2019). "Immunogenicity and Viral Shedding of Russian-Backbone, Seasonal, Trivalent, Live, Attenuated Influenza Vaccine in a Phase II, Randomized, Placebo-Controlled Trial Among Preschool-Aged Children in Urban Bangladesh". Clin Infect Dis. 69 (5): 777–785. doi:10.1093/cid/ciy1003. PMC 6695509. PMID 30481272.
- Diallo, A; Victor, JC; Feser, J; Ortiz, JR; Kanesa-Thasan, N; Ndiaye, M; Diarra, B; Cheikh, S; Diene, D; Ndiaye, T; Ndiaye, A; Lafond, KE; Widdowson, MA; Neuzil, KM (2018). "Immunogenicity and safety of MF59-adjuvanted and full-dose unadjuvanted trivalent inactivated influenza vaccines among vaccine-naïve children in a randomized clinical trial in rural Senegal". Vaccine. 36 (43): 6424–6432. doi:10.1016/j.vaccine.2018.08.032. PMC 6327321. PMID 30224199.
- Brooks, WA; Zaman, K; Lewis, KD; Ortiz, JR; Goswami, D; Feser, J; Sharmeen, AT; Nahar, K; Rahman, M; Rahman, MZ; Barin, B; Yunus, M; Fry, AM; Bresee, J; Azim, T; Neuzil, KM (2016). "Efficacy of a Russian-backbone live attenuated influenza vaccine among young children in Bangladesh: a randomised, double-blind, placebo-controlled trial". Lancet Glob Health. 4 (12): e946–e954. doi:10.1016/S2214-109X(16)30200-5. PMC 5118223. PMID 27746226.
- Victor, JC; Lewis, KD; Diallo, A; Niang, MN; Diarra, B; Dia, N; Ortiz, JR; Widdowson, MA; Feser, J; Hoagland, R; Emery, SL; Lafond, KE; Neuzil, KM (2016). "Efficacy of a Russian-backbone live attenuated influenza vaccine among children in Senegal: a randomised, double-blind, placebo-controlled trial". Lancet Glob Health. 4 (12): e955–e965. doi:10.1016/S2214-109X(16)30201-7. PMC 5118222. PMID 27746224.

== Personal life ==
Neuzil is married with three children.
