= Palo Alto University =

Private university in Palo Alto, California, U.S.

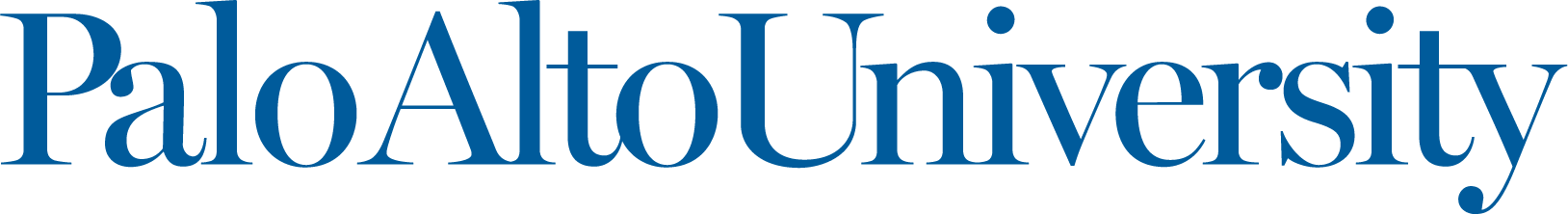
- Former name: Pacific Graduate School of Psychology (1975–2009)
- Motto: Engaging Minds, Improving Lives
- Type: Private university
- Established: 1975
- President: Farouk Dey
- Faculty: 81
- Administrative staff: 48
- Students: 1,081
- Location: Palo Alto, California, United States; 37.3823°N 122.1875°W
- Colors: Blue
- Website: www.paloaltou.edu

Palo Alto University (PAU) is a private university in Palo Alto, California, that focuses on behavioral health disciplines like counseling, psychology, and social work. It was founded in 1975 as the Pacific Graduate School of Psychology and became Palo Alto University in 2009.

Palo Alto University offers undergraduate, master's, and doctoral degree programs. PAU subscribes to the practitioner-scientist training model, which emphasizes clinical practice along with scientific training.

PAU has an interconnected relationship with Stanford University and the Stanford University School of Medicine. PAU maintains its doctoral program in conjunction with Stanford University, often employs its students in Stanford research laboratories, and houses faculty members who teach at both institutions. The Chief Facilities and Sustainability Officer of Stanford Health Care holds a membership on the PAU board of trustees.

== History ==
Palo Alto University traces its origins back to 1975 when the Pacific Graduate School of Psychology was founded in Palo Alto. PGSP was established by a group of students and faculty seeking to enhance their knowledge of clinical psychology, with Robert Kantor serving as its first president.

In 1984, Allen Calvin became president. Two years later, the institution achieved accreditation from the Western Association of Schools and Colleges (WASC), and in 1988 PGSP relocated its campus to East Meadow Drive in Palo Alto.

Also in 1988, the Kurt and Barbara Gronowski Clinic was established in Palo Alto to provide clinical services to the local community. PGSP's Ph.D. program received accreditation from the American Psychological Association (APA) in the same year.

In 2002, PGSP and Stanford University launched the PGSP-Stanford Psy.D. Consortium program, an innovative doctoral program in psychology. In 2006, the consortium achieved APA accreditation as well.

In 2006, PGSP changed to become Palo Alto University (PAU), broadening its scope and offerings. PAU introduced the hybrid Bachelor degree program in Psychology & Social Action (PSA) at De Anza College with courses now also offered at the College of San Mateo, followed by the approval of a major in Business Psychology (BP) at Foothill College in 2009. The MA Clinical Mental Health Counseling program also commenced during this period.

PAU established the Sexual and Gender Identities Clinic in 2009. This clinic provided specialized services to individuals exploring issues related to sexual orientation and gender identity.

Maureen O'Connor assumed the presidency in 2016. In 2017, the MA in Clinical Mental Health Counseling program received accreditation from The Council for Accreditation of Counseling and Related Educational Programs (CACREP).

In late 2018, PAU acquired CONCEPT, a private organization dedicated to professional training in forensic psychology founded by forensic psychologist Patricia Zapf. CONCEPT became the University’s Division of Continuing & Professional Studies, offering postgraduate professional training in specialty areas of psychology for continuing education credit.

PAU earned designation in 2022 as a Hispanic-serving institution; it is also a designated Asian American and Native American Pacific Islander-serving institution. In November 2022, the Mountain View Campus opened, becoming the new location for the Gronowski Center.

In fall 2024, PAU launched its PhD program in Counselor Education and Supervision and a Master of Social Work program the following year. In March 2025, Farouk Dey became the university's fourth president.

== Academics ==
The undergraduate programs at Palo Alto University are offered in partnership with Silicon Valley area community colleges like De Anza College, Foothill College, and the College of San Mateo. The bachelor's degree completion programs are created for community college students wishing to transfer to a Bachelor's program and for college graduates wishing to re-specialize in Psychology and Social Action or Business Psychology. The university facilitates a streamlined transfer process for community college students and those who have completed their initial two years of college.

Palo Alto University offers two master's degree programs, an M.A. in Clinical Mental Health Counseling MFT/LPCC and an M.S. in Psychology. It also offers a Ph.D. in Clinical Psychology that has been accredited by the American Psychological Association (APA) since 1988.

=== PAU-Stanford Psy.D. Consortium ===
The PAU-Stanford Psy.D. Consortium program, in conjunction with the Department of Psychiatry and Behavioral Sciences in Stanford University's School of Medicine, was accredited by the American Psychological Association in 2006. According to U.S. News & World Report, the PAU-Stanford Psy.D. Consortium ranks 87th in the nation for best health schools by category of clinical psychology.

=== Clinical training ===
Students enrolled in the Ph.D. Clinical Psychology program at PAU and the PAU-Stanford Psy.D. Consortium program gain initial clinical practical training at the Gronowski Center. The Gronowski Center is a mental health clinic that operates with partial funding from Palo Alto University and offers subsidized services on a sliding scale to the local Bay Area community. The Gronowski Center offers three specialty clinics: the Sexual and Gender Identities Clinic (SGIC), La Clinica Latina, which offers Spanish-language services, and the eClinic.

=== Continuing and Professional Studies ===
Through the Division of Continuing and Professional Studies (CAPS), PAU partners with experts to provide workshops, webinars, and online training programs in areas relevant to behavioral health professionals in psychology and related disciplines, such as social work, counseling, marriage and family therapy, nursing, corrections, and law enforcement. CAPS is an approved sponsor of continuing education for psychologists (American Psychological Association), social workers (Association of Social Workers Boards), and counselors (National Board of Certified Counselors).

== Omar Seddiqui Research Library ==
The university's library is named for Omar Seddiqui, the former Director and President of the National Archives of Afghanistan and Public Library of Afghanistan (prior to the Saur Revolution).

== Notable faculty ==
- Larry E. Beutler, Past President, Division 12, APA
- Christine Blasey Ford, publicly brought forth accusations of sexual assault by Brett Kavanaugh, who is now associate justice to the Supreme Court of the United States
- Peter Goldblum, founded the LGBTQ+ Area of Emphasis and the SGIC
- Roger L. Greene
