= Jennifer Maynard =

American chemist and academic

- Education: University of Texas at Austin; Stanford University
- Scientific career
- Workplaces: University of Texas at Austin; Stanford University; University of Minnesota-Twin Cities
- Thesis: Engineering antibody therapeutics : approaches to neutralizing bacterial toxins (2002)
- Website: Maynard Lab

Jennifer Maynard is an American chemist who is the Henry Beckman Professor in Chemical Engineering at the University of Texas at Austin. Her research considers the development of therapeutic targets for infectious diseases. She was elected a Senior Member of the National Academy of Inventors in 2023.

== Early life and education ==
Maynard was an undergraduate student in human biology at Stanford University. She moved to the University of Texas at Austin for doctoral research, where she studied antibody therapeutics. She then returned to Stanford as a postdoctoral fellow.

== Research and career ==
Maynard started her independent scientific career at the University of Minnesota, Twin Cities. She spent two years there, before returning to the University of Texas at Austin, where she was made the Henry Beckman Professor in 2018. Her research considers the use of protein engineering in structural biology.

In Texas, Maynard developed protein-based therapeutics for infectious diseases including Bordetella pertussis and cytomegalovirus (CMV). Maynard created T-cell receptors with antibody-like properties; specifically, they could attach to cells with CMV. Cytomegalovirus impacts more than half of adults over the age of 40. In healthy immune systems, cytomegalovirus lies dormant and T-cells detect and destroy infected cells. However, the T-cell defence is diminished in immunocompromised patients, which can make CMV life-threatening.

Maynard created an antibody that can neutralize the anthrax toxin, which was developed by Elusys Therapeutics as Anthim (Obiltoxaximab). The drug was approved by the Food and Drug Administration to treat inhalation anthrax.

In 2021, Maynard joined the board of Releviate Therapeutics, a biopharmaceutical company that looks to support patients with neuropathic pain.

== Awards and honors ==
- 2005 David and Lucile Packard Foundation Fellowship
- 2012 Cockrell School of Engineering Texas Exes Teaching Award
- 2015 University of Texas “Emerging Inventor of the Year” Award
- 2017 Fellow of the American Institute for Medical and Biological Engineering
- 2023 Elected Senior Member of the National Academy of Inventors

== Selected publications ==
- Ching-Lin Hsieh; Jory A Goldsmith; Jeffrey M Schaub; et al. (23 July 2020). "Structure-based design of prefusion-stabilized SARS-CoV-2 spikes". Science. Bibcode:2020Sci...369.1501H. doi:10.1126/science.abd0826. ISSN 0036-8075. PMC 7402631. PMID 32703906. Wikidata Q97681049.
- Maynard J; Georgiou G (1 January 2000). "Antibody engineering". Annual Review of Biomedical Engineering. 2: 339–376. doi:10.1146/annurev.bioeng.2.1.339. ISSN 1523-9829. PMID 11701516. Wikidata Q77148421.
- Jennifer A Maynard; Catharina B M Maassen; Stephen H Leppla; Kathleen Brasky; Jean L Patterson; Brent L Iverson; George Georgiou (1 June 2002). "Protection against anthrax toxin by recombinant antibody fragments correlates with antigen affinity". Nature Biotechnology. 20 (6): 597–601. doi:10.1038/nbt0602-597. ISSN 1087-0156. PMID 12042864. Wikidata Q44013452.
