= Loggie =

Loggie is a surname of scottish origin, the variant of it is Logie.

== Notable people ==
- David Loggie (born 1957), English footballer
- Helen Loggie (1895–1976), American artist
- Ian Loggie (born 1962), Scottish businessman and racing driver
- J. A. Loggie (1862–1936), American politician
- W. S. Loggie (1850–1944), Canadian merchant and politician
