= Pandemic and All-Hazards Preparedness Reauthorization Act of 2013 =

- Long title: An act to reauthorize certain programs under the Public Health Service Act and the Federal Food, Drug, and Cosmetic Act with respect to public health security and all-hazards preparedness and response, and for other purposes.
- Enacted by: the 113th United States Congress

Citations
- Public law: Pub. L. 113–5 (text) (PDF)

Codification
- Acts amended: Public Health Service Act
- Titles amended: 42 U.S.C.: Public Health and Social Welfare
- U.S.C. sections amended: 42 U.S.C. ch. 6A § 201 et seq.

Legislative history
- Introduced in the House as H.R. 307 by Mike Rogers (R–MI) on January 18, 2013; Committee consideration by United States House Committee on Energy and Commerce, United States House Energy Subcommittee on Health, United States Senate Committee on Health, Education, Labor, and Pensions, United States House Committee on Veterans' Affairs, United States House Veterans' Affairs Subcommittee on Health; Passed the House on January 22, 2013 (395-29); Passed the Senate on February 27, 2013 (Unanimous Consent) with amendment; House agreed to Senate amendment on March 4, 2013 (370-28); Signed into law by President Barack Obama on March 13, 2013

The Pandemic and All-Hazards Preparedness Reauthorization Act of 2013 (Pub. L. 113–5 (text) (PDF), H.R. 307, enacted March 13, 2013) is a law enacted by the 113th United States Congress. The Act amends the Public Health Service Act in order to extend, fund, and improve several programs designed to prepare the United States and health professionals in the event of a pandemic, epidemic, or biological, chemical, radiological, or nuclear accident or attack. The Act clarifies the authority of different American officials, makes it easier to temporarily reassign personnel to respond to emergency situations, and alters the process for testing and producing medical countermeasures. The Act is focused on improving preparedness for any public health emergency.

== Background ==
The Pandemic and All-Hazards Preparedness Reauthorization Act (PAHPRA) of 2013 is a follow-up bill to both the Project Bioshield Act of 2004 and the Pandemic and All-Hazards Preparedness Act of 2006. These acts were focused on preparing the country to deal with possible Chemical, Biological, Radiological, and Nuclear (CBRN) attacks, a high-profile concern in the wake of the September 11 attacks. During the 112th United States Congress, the House voted to pass the Pandemic and All-Hazards Preparedness Reauthorization Act of 2011 (H.R. 2405) in a lame duck session, but the bill did not pass in the Senate and never became law. One doctor also argued that the bill was important because it would help doctors deal with critical patients in the event of natural disasters as well as CBRN attacks.

== Provisions/Elements of the Act ==
This summary is based largely on the summary provided by the Congressional Research Service, a public domain source.

=== Title I: Strengthening National Preparedness and Response for Public Health Emergencies ===
Section 101 of the Act amends the Public Health Service Act (PHSA) to require the Secretary of Health and Human Services (HHS) to submit the National Health Security Strategy to the relevant congressional committees in 2014. The Act revises the Strategy's preparedness goals, particularly to require that regular preparedness drills also include drills and exercises to ensure medical surge capacity for events without notice.

Section 101 also requires that the National Health Security Strategy include:

(1) provisions for increasing the preparedness, response capabilities, and surge capacity of ambulatory care facilities, dental health facilities, and critical care service systems;
(2) plans for optimizing a coordinated and flexible approach to the medical surge capacity of hospitals, other health care facilities, critical care, and trauma care and emergency medical systems;
(3) provisions taking into account the unique needs of individuals with disabilities in a public health emergency; and
(4) strategic initiatives to advance countermeasures to diagnose, mitigate, prevent, or treat harm from any biological agent or toxin or any chemical, radiological, or nuclear agent or agents, whether naturally occurring, unintentional, or deliberate.

Section 101 further requires the Secretary to:

(1) monitor emerging issues and concerns as they relate to medical and public health preparedness and response for at-risk individuals in the event of a public health emergency;
(2) disseminate and update novel and best practices of outreach to and care of at-risk individuals before, during, and following public health emergencies in as timely a manner as is practicable, including from the time a public health threat is identified; and
(3) ensure that public health and medical information distributed by HHS during a public health emergency is delivered in a manner that takes into account the range of communication needs of the intended recipients, including at-risk individuals.

Section 102 of the Act requires the Assistant Secretary for Preparedness and Response to provide integrated policy coordination and strategic direction with respect to all matters related to federal public health and medical preparedness and execution and deployment of the federal response for public health emergencies and incidents covered by the National Response Plan before, during, and following public health emergencies.

Section 102 then requires the Assistant Secretary for Preparedness and Response, with respect to overseeing advanced research, development, and procurement of qualified countermeasures, security countermeasures, and qualified pandemic or epidemic products, to:

(1) identify and minimize gaps, duplication and other inefficiencies in medical and public health preparedness and response activities and the actions necessary to overcome these obstacles;
(2) align and coordinate medical and public health grants and cooperative agreements as applicable to preparedness and response activities authorized under the Public Health Service Act;
(3) carry out drills and operational exercises to identify, inform, and address gaps in and policies related to all-hazards medical and public health preparedness; and
(4) conduct periodic meetings with the Assistant to the President for National Security Affairs to provide an update on, and to discuss, medical and public health preparedness and response activities.

Section 102 also changes some of the responsibilities and tasks assigned to the Assistant Secretary for Preparedness and Response. For example, the Assistant Secretary's office is required to develop and update annually a five-year budget plan based on medical countermeasures priorities. The office is also assigned lead responsibility within the Department of Health and Human Services for emergency preparedness and response policy and coordination. It is also granted authority over and responsibility for the Biomedical Advanced Research and Development Authority (BARDA) as well as grants and related authorities related to trauma care. The Assistant Secretary will also now be in charge the Medical Reserve Corps and the Emergency System for Advance Registration of Volunteer Health Professionals.

The Assistant Secretary is required to develop the Public Health Emergency Medical Countermeasures Enterprise Strategy and Implementation Plan, a coordinated strategy and accompanying implementation plan for medical countermeasures to address chemical, biological, radiological, and nuclear threats. The Government Accountability Office (GAO) is required to conduct an independent evaluation of the strategy and implementation plan.

Section 103 creates a new National Advisory Committee on Children and Disasters and sets the termination of the Committee for September 30, 2018.

Section 104 revises and reauthorizes through Fiscal Year 2018 the National Disaster Medical System. The section requires the Secretary of Health and Human Services to take steps to ensure that a range of public health and medical capabilities are represented in the National Disaster Medical System, and that this will take into account the needs of at-risk individuals in the event of a public health emergency. The Act authorizes the Secretary to determine and pay claims for reimbursement for services provided through the National Disaster Medical System directly or through contracts that provide for payment in advance or by way of reimbursement.

Section 105 of the Act reauthorizes through Fiscal Year 2018 a program for public health emergency readiness of the Department of Veterans Affairs (VA) medical centers.

=== Title II: Optimizing State and Local All-Hazards Preparedness and Response ===
Section 201 of the new law allows the Secretary of Health and Human Services to authorize a state or tribe to temporarily reassign state and local public health department or agency personnel funded through Public Health Service Act programs to immediately address a public health emergency in the state or tribe. The Act, however, requires that such reassignments to be voluntary and that the Government Accountability Office evaluate such temporary reassignments.

Section 202 of the Act revises and reauthorizes for Fiscal Years 2014-2018 a program of cooperative agreements to improve state and local public health security. It also requires the Secretary of Health and Human Services to update periodically the criteria for an effective state plan for responding to pandemic influenza and integrate that criteria into the benchmarks and standards that measure levels of preparedness. The section also sets rules regarding the roll-over of funds from one year to the next. Specific funds are reauthorized to be appropriated for FY2014-FY2018 for the influenza vaccine tracking and distribution program in an influenza pandemic.

Section 203 of the Act adds dental entities among those that may carry out education and training activities to improve responses to public health emergencies.

Section 203 also reauthorizes the Emergency System for Advance Registration of Health Professions Volunteers (ESAR-VHP) for FY2014-FY2018, which provides a single national interoperable network of systems to verify the credentials and licenses of health care professionals who volunteer to provide health services during a public health emergency. Likewise, the section reauthorizes for FY2014-FY2018 the Medical Reserve Corps to provide for an adequate supply of volunteers in the case of a public health emergency. The Act requires that training exercises incorporate the needs of at-risk individuals in the event of such an emergency.

Section 203 also revises and reauthorizes appropriations for FY2014-FY2018 for a program of grants and cooperative agreements to improve surge capacity and enhance community and hospital preparedness. The revisions would ensure that some of the programs address the needs of children and at-risk individuals, and would also make community health centers eligible for the program. The Secretary of Health and Human Services is required to implement objective, evidence-based metrics to ensure that entities receiving such grant awards are meeting, to the extent practicable, the applicable goals of the National Health Security Strategy.

Section 204 of the Act reauthorizes appropriations for FY2014-FY2018 for a program to improve public health alert communications and surveillance and public health situational awareness capability. This section adds poison control centers to the integrated system of public health alert communications and surveillance networks.

Section 204 requires the Secretary to submit to the appropriate congressional committees a coordinated strategy and an accompanying implementation plan that demonstrates the measurable steps the Secretary will carry out to:

(1) develop, implement, and evaluate the public health situation awareness network;
(2) modernize and enhance biosurveillance activities; and
(3) improve information sharing, coordination, and communication among disparate biosurveillance systems supported by HHS.

Section 204 defines "biosurveillance" as the process of gathering near real-time biological data that relates to human and zoonotic disease activity and threats to human or animal health, in order to achieve early warning and identification of such health threats, early detection and prompt ongoing tracking of health events, and overall situational awareness of disease activity. The National Biodefense Science Board is required to provide expert advice and guidance regarding the measurable steps the Secretary should take to modernize and enhance biosurveillance activities pursuant to the efforts of HHS to ensure comprehensive, real-time all-hazards biosurveillance capabilities.

=== Title III: Enhancing Medical Countermeasure Review ===
Section 301 amends the Federal Food, Drug, and Cosmetic Act (FFDCA) to revise requirements about animal testing. The revision would increase regulatory predictability for medical countermeasures sponsors by expanding the use of Special Protocol Assessments to animal trials and any associated clinical trials necessary to support licensure of medical countermeasures.

Section 302, the "Authorization for Medical Products for Use in Emergencies" amends the Food and Drug Administration's (FDA) current Emergency Use Authorization authority to enable the FDA to prepare for and prevent a public health emergency rather than simply responding to it.

Section 302 also revises the Secretary of Health and Human Service's authority to allow the use of unapproved medical products or the unapproved use of an approved product. The Secretary is now allowed to make a declaration that the circumstances exist justifying such an authorization and base the determination on:

(1) a (general) threat (rather than a specific threat as under current law),
(2) a significant potential for a public health emergency,
(3) the health and security of U.S. citizens abroad, and
(4) the identification of a material threat sufficient to affect national security.

Section 302 outlines the Secretary's new authority to do the following:

(1) extend the expiration date for medical countermeasures intended to be used for emergency responses;
(2) grant waivers of current Good Manufacturing Practices;
(3) authorize emergency dispensing of medical countermeasures during an actual emergency without an individual prescription if permitted under State law or permitted by an order of the Secretary of Health and Human Services;
(4) work with other Health and Human Services agencies to create and issue emergency use instructions concerning a product's conditions of use; and
(5) authorize FDA to waive a product's Risk Evaluation and Mitigation Strategy if necessary.

Section 303 contains official definitions for security countermeasure, qualified countermeasure and qualified pandemic or epidemic product that will be added to the Federal Food, Drug and Cosmetic Act.

Section 304 focuses on the relationship between government entities and private companies working on medical countermeasures. The Secretary is required to:

(1) ensure the appropriate involvement of Food and Drug Administration (FDA) personnel in interagency activities related to countermeasure advanced research and development,
(2) ensure the appropriate involvement and consultation of FDA personnel in flexible manufacturing activities,
(3) promote countermeasure expertise within the FDA, and
(4) maintain teams composed of FDA personnel with expertise on countermeasures.

The Secretary is required to provide final guidance to industry within one year after enactment of the Act regarding the development of animal models to support approval, clearance, or licensure of countermeasures and epidemic and pandemic products when human efficacy studies are not ethical or feasible. The Secretary must also establish a procedure by which a sponsor or applicant developing a countermeasure for which human efficacy studies are not ethical or practicable, and that has an approved investigational new drug application or investigational device exemption, may request and receive: (1) a meeting to discuss proposed animal model development activities, and (2) a meeting before initiating pivotal animal studies. The Act also requires such meetings to include discussion of animal models for pediatric populations, as appropriate.

Section 305 requires the Secretary to establish a formal process for obtaining scientific feedback and interactions regarding the development and regulatory review of eligible countermeasures by facilitating the development of written regulatory management plans. It then details some requirements for this process, such as the ability of a sponsor or applicant to initiate the process by request, the requirement that the FDA work with that sponsor within 90 days, and what components are a necessary part of the regulatory management plan.

While Section 305 requires the Secretary to establish regulatory management plans for all security countermeasures for which a request is submitted, it does allow the Director of Biomedical Advanced Research and Development Authority to prioritize which other eligible countermeasures may receive regulatory management plans if the Secretary determines that resources are not available to establish regulatory management plans for all other eligible countermeasures.

Section 306 directs the Secretary to make publicly available on the FDA website a report detailing the countermeasure development and FDA review activities.

Section 307 makes improvements to the current law in order to address the special needs of children. It requires the Secretary to solicit input from the Assistant Secretary for Preparedness and Response and the Director of Biomedical Advanced Research and Development Authority regarding pediatric studies for medical countermeasures. More specifically, the Act requires the Secretary to consider additional information in developing the priority list of needs in pediatric therapeutics that require study, including the availability of countermeasures to address the needs of pediatric populations.

=== Title IV: Accelerating Medical Countermeasure Advanced Research and Development ===
Section 401 makes changes and updates to the BioShield project. The Act authorizes the Secretary of Health and Human Services to enter into contracts and other agreements that are in the government's best interest in meeting identified security countermeasure needs, including reimbursement of the cost of advanced research and development as a reasonable, allowable, and allocable direct cost of the contract involved. It requires that a contract to procure security countermeasures include a clear statement of defined government purpose limited to uses related to a security countermeasure.

Section 401 would also reauthorize the Project BioShield Special Reserve Fund (SRF), originally established in 2004. It would reauthorize the SRF at $2.8 billion for FY 2014 – 2018, which is consistent with the original appropriation of $5.6 billion over FY 2004 – 2013. The new law prohibits SRF funds from being used for anything other than medical countermeasures procurement, research and development. It requires the Secretary of Health and Human Services to provide a report to Congress when funds available in the SRF go below $1.5 billion. It would also allow the use of up to 50 percent of funds available in the SRF for advanced research and development of medical countermeasures at the Biomedical Advanced Research and Development Authority (BARDA).

Section 402 reauthorizes BARDA, which was created in 2006 to help bridge the gap between medical countermeasures development and procurement. It would reauthorize BARDA at $415 million for FY 2013 – 2017, which is equal to the program's FY 2012 appropriated level. The Secretary of Health and Human Services is instructed to support innovation under BARDA by promoting dose sparing technologies, efficacy increasing technologies, and platform technologies.

Section 402 also extends the Freedom of Information Act (FOIA) exemption for specific technical data or scientific information that is created or obtained during countermeasure and product advanced research and development under the Public Health Service Act that reveals significant and not otherwise known vulnerabilities of existing medical or public health defenses against biological, chemical, nuclear, or radiological threats. It likewise extends the antitrust exemption to permit meetings and consultations to discuss the development of security countermeasures, qualified countermeasures, or qualified pandemic or epidemic products.

Section 403 reauthorizes the Strategic National Stockpile for FY 2014-FY2018. It requires the Secretary to:

(1) submit to the appropriate congressional committees, to the extent that the disclosure of such information does not compromise national security, the annual review of the contents of the Stockpile; and
(2) review and revise the contents of the Stockpile to ensure that the potential depletion of countermeasures currently in the Stockpile is identified and appropriately addressed, including through necessary replenishment.

Section 404 revises membership requirements for the National Biodefense Science Board by adding members with pediatric and state or local expertise. Finally, it requires the Board to give any recommendation, finding, or report provided to the Secretary also to the appropriate congressional committees.

== Congressional Budget Office report ==
This summary is based largely on the summary provided by the Congressional Budget Office about H.R. 307 as reported by the Senate Committee on Health, Education, Labor, and Pensions on February 14, 2013. The CBO is a public domain source.

Pandemic and All-Hazards Preparedness Reauthorization Act of 2013 amends the Public Health Service Act and the United States Code to authorize funding for certain activities carried out by the United States Department of Health and Human Services (HHS) and the United States Department of Veterans Affairs (VA) that would support the readiness of the public health system to address public health and medical emergencies.

Based on information provided by the HHS and the VA, the CBO estimates that implementing the act would cost about $11 billion over the 2014-2018 period, assuming the appropriation of the authorized amounts. The Consolidated Appropriations Act, 2012, included funding totaling about $2 billion in fiscal year 2012 for activities similar to those that would be authorized by H.R. 307. The CBO assumes that amounts appropriated through the Continuing Appropriations Resolution, 2013, for those activities are similar to 2012 levels.

H.R. 307 also changes the terms for Project Bioshield contracts, which would result in a change in direct spending. Assuming H.R. 307 is enacted this spring, it would decrease direct spending by $58 million over the 2013-2018 period, but would result in no net change in direct spending over the 2013-2023 period. Because the legislation would affect direct spending, pay-as-you-go procedures apply. Enacting H.R. 307 would not affect revenues.

H.R. 307 contains no intergovernmental or private-sector mandates as defined in the Unfunded Mandates Reform Act (UMRA).

== Procedural history ==
=== House of Representatives ===
The Bill was introduced into the House of Representatives on January 18, 2013. It was sponsored by Rep. Mike Rogers (R-MI) and had five original co-sponsors. The Bill was immediately referred to the United States House Committee on Energy and Commerce, the United States House Energy Subcommittee on Health, and the United States House Committee on Veterans' Affairs. On January 22, 2013, the Bill was considered on the House floor, where it was then voted on after a motion to suspend the rules and pass the Bill. The Bill then passed with a vote of 395-29 as Roll Call 24.

=== Senate ===
The Bill was received by the Senate on January 23, 2013. It was referred to the United States Senate Committee on Health, Education, Labor, and Pensions. On February 14, 2013, the Bill was reported out of Committee "with an amendment in the nature of a substitute". The Senate passed the Bill on February 27, 2013, with Unanimous Consent.

=== Second vote in the House ===
Due to the Senate's amendment, it was necessary to vote on the Bill again in the House of Representatives. The amendment was briefly considered on the floor on March 4, 2013. That evening, the Bill again passed the House, with the Senate amendment this time, under a suspension of the rules. The vote, Roll Call 56, was 370–28.

=== Presidential signature ===
The Bill was presented to President of the United States Barack Obama on March 5, 2013. He signed it into law on March 13, 2013, whereupon it became Public Law 113–5.
