= Ology =

An ology or -logy is a scientific discipline.

Ology or Ologies may also refer to:

- Ologies (podcast), a science podcast hosted by Allie Ward
- Ology (book series), a fantasy book series by Dugald Steer
- Ology (album), 2016 album by Gallant
- Ology Bioservices, an American biopharmaceutical company
- OLogy, a science website for kids from the American Museum of Natural History
- "Ology", song by Living Colour from the album Time's Up
- List of words with the suffix -ology

== See also ==
- Logy (disambiguation)
