= T. G. Richards and Company Store =

- T.G. Richards and Company Store
- U.S. National Register of Historic Places
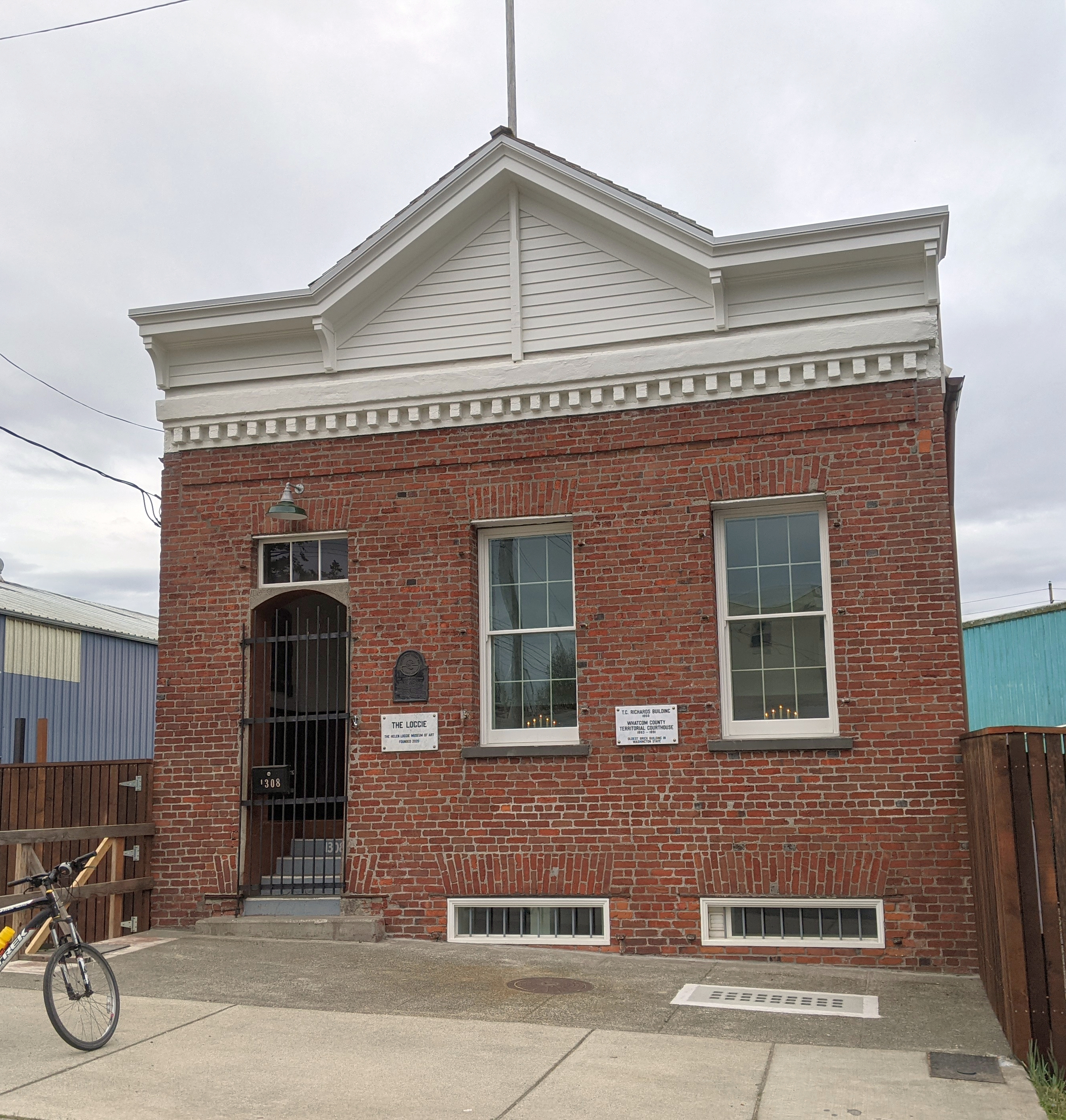
- Built in 1858, this is the oldest brick building in Washington.
- Location: 1308 E Street; Bellingham, Whatcom County, Washington, United States
- Coordinates: 48°45′17″N 122°29′10″W
- Built: 1858
- Architectural style: Classical Revival
- NRHP reference No.: 03000861
- Added to NRHP: August 28, 2003

The T.G. Richards and Company Store, also known as Whatcom County Territorial Courthouse, is the first and oldest brick building in the state of Washington, United States, and is listed on the U.S. National Register of Historic Places.

== History ==
This two-story brick building was built in 1858 by the partnership of Thomas G. Richards and his brother Charles E. Richards, for a cost of US $8,000. A note in one of Howard Buswell's files, located in the Center for Pacific Northwest Studies, identifies John Alexander (a prominent settler on Whidbey Island) as being in charge of the construction. It was initially used as a storehouse of the T. G. Richards Company, supplying those stopping in what was then the town of Whatcom, Washington Territory, on their way to the Fraser Canyon Gold Rush. The building was constructed of brick manufactured in San Francisco. In Spring of 2012, the bricks were scientifically matched to a Nagle brick fragment. Nagle was an early brick maker in the city. The bark Ann Parry brought the bricks to Bellingham Bay on July 16, 1858. The Daily Alta California Shipping Intelligence listed her carrying 100,000 bricks and 73 barrels of lime. A second ship, the DM Hall, may have brought the windows and doors. In 1863, the building was sold to Whatcom County for the price of US$2,000, to be used as the (third) County Courthouse for Whatcom County. Court matters such as trials were handled in Port Townsend, not Whatcom. However, the building has become known as the "Territorial Courthouse", because of its role as the county courthouse in the days before statehood. In addition, the building served as the jail, and in 1873, became the home of the Bellingham Bay Mail newspaper. By 1877, a pharmacy was being run on the first floor.

Originally being bounded by the tide flats of the bay, in 1874 a breakwater was added in to protect the building's foundation from the sea. In 1883, a vault, and five additional jail cells were added. In 1889 the building was deemed unsafe for use, and the county government offices and jail were moved to temporary quarters nearby. (In 1891 the county moved into the new courthouse on "G" Street, constructed of Chuckanut sandstone.) In 1890-1891, the Women's Relief Corps (WRC), an organization benefiting veterans of the American Civil War, began to rent the building. By 1906, Whatcom County had deeded the building into the private sector, when it was sold to members of the Grand Army of the Republic, J. B. Steadman Post No. 24, and the WRC. The building has since seen the tide flats filled in, resulting in the rise of E Street, so that the first floor has become the basement, and the second floor becoming the ground floor. Later occupants include the members of the Junior Order of United American Mechanics, a Jehovah's Witness Church, Aker's Taxidermy, The Northwest Passage (a 60s - 70s alternative newspaper), Base Camp, and lastly, a home to different artists and pottery makers. The building was added to the National Register of Historic Places in 2003.

The building was sold in 2019. A complete period restoration was completed in 2020. The building now houses the Helen Loggie Museum of Art which opened in 2021.

== See also ==
List of Registered Historic Places in Washington
