= Biomedical Advanced Research and Development Authority =

U.S. Government organization

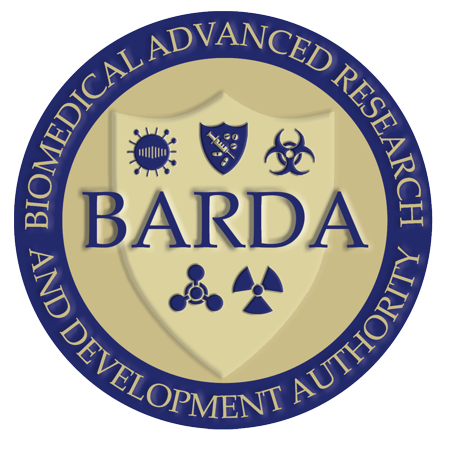

Agency overview
- Formed: December 2006
- Jurisdiction: Federal government of the United States
- Headquarters: Hubert H. Humphrey Building, Washington, D.C.
- Employees: 150
- Annual budget: $1.015 billion USD (2024)
- Agency executive: Gary Disbrow, Acting Director
- Parent agency: Office of the Assistant Secretary for Preparedness and Response
- Website: www.medicalcountermeasures.gov/barda

The Biomedical Advanced Research and Development Authority (BARDA) is a center within the Administration for Strategic Preparedness and Response (ASPR) located within the U.S. Department of Health and Human Services (HHS) responsible for the procurement and development of medical countermeasures, principally against bioterrorism, including chemical, biological, radiological, and nuclear (CBRN) threats, as well as pandemic influenza and emerging diseases. BARDA was established in 2006 through the Pandemic and All-Hazards Preparedness Act (PAHPA). The ASPR center manages Project BioShield, which funds the research, development and stockpiling of vaccines and treatments that the government could use during public health emergencies such as CBRN attacks.

In addition to preparing and maintaining bioterrorism responses and countermeasures, HHS, through ASPR and BARDA, prepares and maintains an integrated system of medical countermeasures for both known or unknown, and re-emerging or novel types of public health emergencies. These include diagnostic tools, therapeutics, such as antibiotics and antivirals, and preventative measures, such as vaccines. BARDA is an established, official interface between the U.S. federal government and the biomedical industry. BARDA also participates in the governmental inter-agency Public Health Emergency Medical Countermeasures Enterprise (PHEMCE), providing coordination across the U.S. federal government in developing and deploying such countermeasures.

BARDA works with the biomedical industry, using grants and other assistance, to promote advanced research, innovation and the development of medical devices, tests, vaccines and therapeutics. BARDA also procures and maintains stockpiles of materials, such as drugs, personal protective equipment (PPE) and vaccines, for the Strategic National Stockpile (SNS).

== History ==
=== Creation and legislative history ===
BARDA was created and authorized by Title IV Sec 401 of the Pandemic and All-Hazards Preparedness Act (PAHPA) of 2006. PAHPA amended the Public Health Service Act by the addition of section 319L to that law. PAHPA provided new authorities for a number of programs to counter CBRN as well as epidemic, pandemic and emerging disease threats, established the position of Assistant Secretary for Preparedness and Response (ASPR) as well as BARDA reporting to the ASPR, and built on Project BioShield, previously created in 2004.

PAHPA reauthorized the Public Health Security and Bioterrorism Preparedness and Response Act of 2002, following the 2001 anthrax attacks ensuing the September 11, 2001 terrorist attacks on the United States. BARDA was reauthorized by the Pandemic and All-Hazards Preparedness Reauthorization Act of 2013 (PAHPRA) and again in the Pandemic and All-Hazards Preparedness and Advancing Innovation Act of 2019 (PAHPAI).

=== Leadership ===
The inaugural director of BARDA, from its inception in 2006 through April 2008 was Carol D. Linden, who served both as the principal deputy director and acting director. From April 2008 through November 14, 2016, the director was Robin A. Robinson, formerly director of the BARDA Influenza and Emerging Diseases division. He was succeeded as director by Rick Bright from November 15, 2016 through April 20, 2020, when he was moved in what later became a whistleblower controversy during the COVID-19 pandemic in the United States (SARS-CoV-2). As of April 23, 2020, Gary Disbrow is the BARDA director, formerly director of the Medical Countermeasures program and director of the CBRN division at BARDA. All early BARDA directors also concurrently served as Deputy Assistant Secretary for Preparedness and Response.

=== Organizational structure ===
BARDA's 2011–2016 Strategic plan described its composition as the Office of the Director plus seven functional divisions:

- Chemical, Biological, Radiological and Nuclear (CBRN) Countermeasures
- Clinical Studies
- Influenza
- Manufacturing Facilities and Engineering
- Modeling
- Regulatory and Quality Affairs
- Strategic Science and Technology

In June 2018, BARDA announced a new initiative, its Division of Research Innovation and Ventures (DRIVe). DRIVe is a business accelerator to fund and support the development of a portfolio of healthcare products.

== Roles and purpose ==
BARDA plays a unique and unusual role within the structure of the US federal government, assisting in getting drugs, deemed essential during public health emergencies including attacks compromising US national security, to market. Such assistance ranges from direct funding, procuring and stockpiling medical countermeasures (MCM's), to helping obtain US FDA approvals, including Emergency Use Authorization (EUA) if needed. By the rare nature of such public health emergencies, the required therapies or countermeasures, while critical during the emergency, may not constitute a financially viable or profitable investment, for sufficiently large pharmaceutical companies.

Such gaps in the US government medical countermeasures infrastructure have been described as "bridging the valley of death". In this respect, BARDA provides services similar to those offered by venture capitalists or business accelerators in private industry, although BARDA takes no financial stake in the final product once approved by the FDA.

BARDA acts in concert with the PHEMCE. Activities include:

- Setting requirements for medical countermeasures (MCMs)
- Funding advanced research and development (ARD) for CBRN and pandemic MCMs
- Administration of national biodefense fund(s)
- Promoting innovation in development and manufacturing
- Acquiring and maintaining MCM stockpiles

== Budget ==
During public health emergencies, BARDA's budget may be increased by additional congressional appropriations.

In the mid-2020s, BARDA's annual budget remained near $1 billion. The FY2024 President's Budget request included approximately $1.015 billion for BARDA Advanced Research and Development activities, while the FY2025 President's Budget proposed approximately $970 million in funding.

During the COVID-19 pandemic period, BARDA's FY2020 annual budget was reported at approximately $1.6 billion depending on the precise allocation of costs, including projects overseen or managed on behalf of the Office of the Assistant Secretary for Preparedness and Response (ASPR). The FY2020 proposed budget, excluding supplemental congressional appropriations related to the pandemic, represented an increase from approximately $1.27 billion in FY2019 and $1.02 billion in FY2018. This figure included $512 million in medical countermeasures including $192 million for combating antibiotic-resistant bacteria and $260 million USD for advanced research and development (ARD).

== Major initiatives ==
- Research and development
  - Medical countermeasures
    - Vaccines
    - Antimicrobial drugs
    - Therapeutic products
    - Diagnostics
    - Non-pharmaceutical medical supplies
- Stockpiling programs (see below)
  - Project BioShield
  - Pandemic Influenza Emergency Supplemental Fund
  - Strategic National Stockpile
    - Antibiotics
    - Vaccines
      - Anthrax vaccine
    - Antidotes
    - Medical equipment and supplies
- Manufacturing infrastructure

== Setting requirements ==
BARDA sets the requirements for medical countermeasures in order to reduce the threats of public health emergencies such as pandemic influenza, CBRN threats, and emerging diseases. The requirements formalize the minimum standards private industry needs to use in order to produce medical countermeasures acceptable to BARDA.

=== Formulation ===
Stakeholders across the federal government and the Public Health Emergency Medical Countermeasures Enterprise (PHEMCE) specify requirements. Once established, these requirements drive BARDA's advanced research and development, as well as acquisition. Requirements are created consistent with the planning and prioritization expressed in the HHS PHEMCE Implementation Plan for CBRN Threats.

=== Pandemic influenza ===
Pandemic Influenza requirements are defined by strategic objectives established in the "National Strategy for Pandemic Influenza" and the "HHS Pandemic Influenza Plan".

== Advanced research and development ==
=== Overview ===
One of BARDA's major objectives is the creation of a robust and dynamic pipeline of medical countermeasures through advanced research and development (ARD). Its goal is to provide multiple product candidates in each program to both account for attrition in medical countermeasure deployment and to establish multi-product/multi-manufacturer portfolios for sustainability and redundancy.

BARDA medical countermeasures include vaccines, antimicrobial drugs, therapeutic products, diagnostics and non-pharmaceutical medical supplies, as well as devices for public health medical emergencies including chemical, biological, radiological, and nuclear threats (CBRN), pandemic influenza (PI) and emerging infectious diseases (EID).

=== Influenza and emerging infectious diseases ===
One of BARDA's key activities includes the Influenza and Emerging Infectious Diseases Division. This program aims to support the advanced development of vaccines, therapeutic and diagnostic medical countermeasures that address emerging infectious disease threats.

=== Nerve agents ===
Nerve agents and other chemical weapons are a priority for fighting CBRN threats. VX gas, which was the nerve agent that reportedly killed the half-brother of North Korean leader Kim Jong-un, Provides an example. BARDA also stockpiles an anti-seizure medication, midazolam, developed by Meridian Medical Technologies, to be made available in an autoinjector to treat the effects of nerve agents on the neurological system.

Research into substitute medical countermeasures (MCM) against nerve agents conducted by BARDA has shown the utility of current atropine solutions used in limited quantities in the treatment of cholinergic pathologies, to promote dilation of the eye, or organophosphate poisoning. Noting the lack of sufficient stocks in the case of mass-casualty situations, citing the 1995 Tokyo subway sarin attack, the study proposed alternate routes of administration (ROI) for atropine. The bioavailability of atropine via alternate ROIs was proven to be effective, though consideration was placed on expansion of atropine stockpiles and the dispersion of MCMs to local entities.

=== Antibiotic resistant bacteria ===
In October 2017 BARDA entered a nine-month $12-million contract with the San Francisco-based biopharmaceutical company Achaogen, sponsoring late-stage development of C-scape, an antibiotic used against resistant bacteria and a potential treatment against weaponized strains of bacteria. In April 2019, Achaogen declared bankrupt.

== Stockpile programs ==
The Pandemic and All-Hazards Preparedness Act (PAHPA) established BARDA as the focal point within HHS for the advanced development and acquisition of medical countermeasures to protect the American civilian population against Chemical, Biological, Radiological, and Nuclear (CBRN) and naturally occurring threats to public health.

BARDA's stockpiling efforts are focused on building reserves of critical countermeasures as they emerge from Advanced Development. Stockpiling contributes to preparedness in two ways:

1. Stockpiled medical countermeasures directly support readiness, as the stockpiled products can help to mitigate the effects of an event or outbreak.
2. Establishment of the stockpile helps to ready suppliers to meet the increased demands that an event will bring about, becoming practiced in the production and delivery of products.

BARDA's acquisitions for the stockpile are not one-time events, complete upon the approval/licensure of a product. Rather, programs are structured to include incremental milestone acquisitions during late stage development, to make available products still in development that may increase preparedness in an event, pending Emergency Use Authorization. Furthermore, we aim to establish stockpiling milestones to address long-term commitments post-licensure.

=== CBRN stockpile programs ===
In FY 2004, the US Congress appropriated $5.6 billion USD to the Project BioShield Special Reserve Fund (SRF) to support the Project BioShield goal of acquiring CBRN medical countermeasures over a 10-year period. BARDA used these funds to support acquisition programs for the procurement of medical countermeasures against high priority CBRN threats. The agency gives funds to pharmaceutical companies to develop countermeasures. As of January 2020, BARDA had helped obtain FDA approval for at least 50 products.

=== Pandemic influenza stockpile programs ===
Using funds from the Pandemic Influenza Emergency Supplemental Fund, BARDA is leading the nation toward the vaccine and antiviral stockpile goals for preparedness for pandemic influenza.

In December 2019, BARDA awarded a US$$226 million six-year contract to Sanofi Pasteur, a global pharmaceutical company with U.S. headquarters in Bridgewater, New Jersey, to increase production capacity for an influenza vaccine. In September 2019, a US presidential executive order required the US government to modernize influenza vaccines and technologies in order to improve national health security.

=== Strategic national stockpile ===
The Public Health Security and Bioterrorism Preparedness Act of 2002 directed the secretary of health and human services to develop and maintain a Strategic National Stockpile (SNS). The mission of the SNS is to provide for the emergency health security of the United States in the event of a terrorist attack or any other public health emergency.

The SNS is the largest US national supply of pharmaceuticals and medical supplies for use in a small outbreak to a large-scale, multiple-threat emergency. When state, local, tribal, and/or territorial responders request federal assistance to support their response efforts, the stockpile is used to ensure that supplies are available when and where needed. The SNS is Intended to contains enough vaccines, antimicrobial drugs, therapeutic products, and non-pharmaceutical medical supplies in the wake of any public health emergency including terrorist attacks whether chemical, biological, radiological, and/or nuclear, as well as pandemic influenza and emerging infectious diseases.

Emergent BioSolutions manufactures the only U.S. Food and Drug Administration licensed vaccine against anthrax disease, called BioThrax, which is recommended by the CDC as a post-exposure prophylactic for anthrax infection.

As part of a $450 million contract with BARDA for the SNS, Emergent also developed the only FDA-licensed botulinum antitoxin, Heptavalent Botulism Antitoxin (BAT) for treating naturally occurring botulism. Canada also approved BAT.

The US federal government approved a plan against CBRN threats after the 2001 anthrax letters attack, at the time the worst biological attack in United States history.

BARDA also invested in the late stage development of a product called NuThrax developed by Emergent Biosolutions, which makes the other anthrax vaccine, BioThrax. According to Homeland Preparedness News, NuThrax will be able to provide immunity to anthrax after two doses, versus the three doses under the currently stockpiled vaccine (BioThrax).

== Manufacturing and building infrastructure ==
Ensuring the availability of medical countermeasures for public health emergencies is central to BARDA's mission. This includes ensuring that manufacturing infrastructure is sufficient to support the production of required products, in a manner that is timely, reliable and cost effective.

BARDA has taken multiple approaches to bringing online the necessary infrastructure for medical countermeasure manufacturing; it supports the construction of new facilities as well as retrofitting existing facilities for maximal capacity and flexibility. It has also explored the use of multi-product manufacturing facilities to provide flexibility and surge capacity and enable rapidly providing countermeasures in the dosage forms required for use in the field. BARDA has also established a network of formulation/fill-finish manufacturers for emergency production and distribution. BARDA has also explored the creation of centers of excellence for the development and production of non-commercial products with assistance from industry partners.

== Advancing innovation ==
PAHPA charges BARDA to support innovation to reduce the time and cost of medical countermeasures and product advanced research and development. This was to be accomplished through development of technologies that assist the advanced development of countermeasures, investment in research tools and technologies, and research to promote strategic initiatives including rapid diagnostics, broad spectrum antimicrobials, and vaccine manufacturing technologies. PAHPAI provided further authorities for BARDA to promote innovation through industry assistance and partnerships.

BARDA has taken this innovation mandate as an opportunity to work with its partners (including NIH, DoD, CDC, industry, and academia) to create new ways to "make medical countermeasure better". Examples of this approach to innovation could include the development of animal models to support efficacy testing, immune modulation and other broad-spectrum approaches, immunity assessment, and analytical (potency) assays.

A cited example of BARDA's approach to innovation from the Pandemic Influenza program is BARDA's "Mix and Match" study, assessing various combinations of antigens and adjuvants to obtain a more robust immune response. BARDA has stated plans to support similar initiatives, leveraging technology platforms and products from multiple companies. For example, PAHPA provided an "antitrust" authority that BARDA has used to facilitate cooperation between companies for whom such cooperation would otherwise be difficult to accomplish.

Fujifilm Corporation announced in April 2017 that it would invest $130 million to increase production capacity for its BioCDMO division. The division "focuses on contract development & manufacturing for biologics." Fujifilm Diosynth Biotechnologies, with help from a BARDA grant, invested around $93 million to build a production facility in the US state of Texas. The facility would include "mammalian cell culture bioreactors" and was planned to open operations at the start of 2018.

In April 2017, Switzerland-based Basilea Pharmaceutica and the Food and Drug Administration reached an agreement regarding two phase 3 clinical studies of an antibiotic developed by Basilea, ceftobiprole. The two clinical studies would examine ceftobiprole for the treatment of "Staphylococcus aureus bacteremia (bloodstream infections) and acute bacterial skin and skin structure infections." Basilea signed a contract with BARDA, which it entered into in 2016 for the clinical phase 3 development of the antibiotic. BARDA provided initial funding of $20 million but could provide up to $100 million over a period of 4–5 years.

In 2017, BARDA signed a three-year $8.1 million contract with InBios International, Inc. of Seattle, Washington to develop a "point-of-care diagnostic test that may be able to determine within 15 minutes whether a patient has been infected with the bacterium that causes anthrax."

In September 2017, BARDA awarded Velico Medical $15.5 million for development of a technology that uses spray drying of human plasma for transfusions. The current industry standard is to freeze plasma. Frozen plasma can take 40 or more minutes to defrost and deliver. According to Fierce Biotech, "Velico has Spray Dried Plasma technology (SpDPTM) that enables the storage of blood as dry powder, rather than the typical freezing, for subsequent rehydration. It's expected to be useful in hospital emergency rooms, operating suites and intensive care units--as well as in a military or field hospital setting."

In July 2005, at the hearings before the Committee on Health, Education, Labor, and Pensions, the first CEO and director of the center, Tara O'Toole, MD, MPH, has pointed to center's role as the "BioDARPA" (i.e. "biomedical DARPA").

== Pandemic and emerging disease responses ==
=== Anthrax ===
Since the 2001 anthrax attacks in the United States, BARDA has supported the research and development of diagnostics, therapeutics and vaccines for anthrax. Therapeutics include the antibiotics XERAVA Of Tetraphase Pharmaceuticals, ZEMDRI of Achaogen (rights ex-Greater China bought by Cipla USA) Gepotidacin of GlaxoSmithKline and SPR994 of Spero Therapeutics. In July 2018, Spero was jointly awarded up to USD $54 million by BARDA and the Defense Threat Reduction Agency (DTRA), in support of SPR994 development. SPR994 also has application to the treatment of multi-drug resistant (MDR) bacteria.

BARDA also supported the development of the antitoxins Anthrasil of Cangene (March 2015 FDA approval) and Anthim of Elusys Therapeutics (March 2016 FDA approval). Anthrax vaccines whose development was supported by BARDA include BioThrax (AVA), AV7909 of Emergent BioSolutions Px563L of Pfenex and NasoShield of Altimmune.

=== Botulism ===
Botulism is caused by the botulinum toxin, one of the deadliest known toxins. While the bacteria that cause botulism occur naturally, botulism outbreaks are considered rare and unlikely by the US CDC, except as the result of a bioterrorism attack. BARDA maintains a supply of botulism antitoxins through the Strategic National Stockpile (SNS).

=== COVID-19 ===
As of June, seven companies had been chosen for funding from Operation Warp Speed to expedite development and preparation for manufacturing their respective vaccine candidates: Johnson & Johnson (Janssen Pharmaceutical), AstraZeneca-University of Oxford, Pfizer-BioNTech, Moderna, Merck, Vaxart, and Inovio. Funding from BARDA totaled more than $2 billion by the end of June, with the largest awards of $1.2 billion given to AstraZeneca and $483 million to Moderna.

In June 2020, BARDA and the U.S. Department of Defenses signed a $143 million contract with SiO_{2} Materials Science to ramp up production of vials and syringes used for COVID drugs and vaccines.

=== Ebola ===
After the 2014 West Africa Ebola virus epidemic (followed by the Kivu Ebola epidemic starting in 2018), BARDA supported the development of the first Ebola vaccine, ERVEBO, by BioProtection Systems, a subsidiary of NewLink Genetics Inc. (now Lumos Pharma). The vaccine was announced by the ASPR on December 19, 2019; ERVEBO, a vaccine for the Zaire ebola virus was licensed from NewLink Genetics in 2014 and produced and taken to market by Merck. It was successfully used in the 2018 Ebola virus epidemic in the Democratic Republic of the Congo (DRC).

=== Smallpox ===
Smallpox is a highly contagious, potentially fatal disease caused by the Variola virus. While the US discontinued immunization in 1972, and it was declared eradicated by the World Health Organization (WHO) in 1980 (the last known naturally occurring case was seen in 1977, in Somalia), it is still considered a potent bioterrorism threat. BARDA began stockpiling smallpox vaccines in 2010. By 2018, BARDA had procured millions of doses of TPOXX, of SIGA Technologies, by then the first (and only) FDA-approved antiviral smallpox drug therapy, for the SNS. In 2019, BARDA announced a partnership with BioFactura to develop a second therapeutic, a monoclonal antibody smallpox treatment.

=== Zika ===
As of early 2020, there were no publicly acknowledged BARDA biomedical collaborations (diagnostics, therapies or vaccines) for the Zika virus. However BARDA has an announced (general) four-part Zika strategy

- Prevention (vaccines)
- Detection (diagnostics)
- Ensuring a safe blood supply (screening)
- National Countermeasure Response Activation (developer assistance)

== Medical countermeasure portfolio ==
| Threat | Product | Development Stage |
|---|---|---|
| Smallpox | TPOXX (SIGA Technologies) | Procured |
| Botulism | Botulism therapeutic product | Procured |
| Anthrax | Nuthrax (Emergent Biosolutions) | Late stage development and procurement (2017) |
| Anthrax | BioThrax (Emergent Biosolutions) | Stockpiled |
| Ebola virus | Ebola therapeutic and Ebola vaccine | Late stage development (2017) |
| Nerve agents (such as VX) | Midazolam in an autoinjector (Meridian Medical Technologies) | Preparing to stockpile (2017) |
| Mustard gas | In process (2017) | Future development |
| Chlorine gas | In process (2017) | Future development |
| Improvised nuclear device or dirty bomb | Cytokine products | Procured |
| Burn injuries | Silverlon, a metallic silver-based antimicrobial wound dressing (Argentum Medical) | Stockpiled |

Table source:

== Integrated national biodefense medical countermeasures portfolio ==
The Department of Defense (DoD) and HHS each identify medical countermeasure requirements to address their different missions and focus. DoD's focus is on protecting the armed forces prior to exposure, whereas HHS's focus is on response to threats to the civilian population after exposure in a CBRN event.

However, there are areas of common requirements or interest where medical countermeasure candidates, resources and information can be appropriately shared to maximize opportunities for success in the development of medical countermeasures for the highest priority threats. BARDA, in partnership with other HHS and DoD partners, is leading an Integrated National Biodefense Medical Countermeasure Portfolio to leverage resources and programs across the agencies that develop and acquire CBRN medical countermeasures to more effectively address the broad range of common threats and requirements. Members of this Integrated Portfolio include BARDA, biodefense programs in the National Institute of Allergy and Infectious Diseases (NIAID), which also oversees all biodefense activities across the other Institutes of the National Institutes of Health (NIH), and multiple elements of the DoD Chemical and Biological Defense Program.

== Controversies ==
On April 20, 2020, during the COVID-19 pandemic in the United States, in an action that led to the filing of a US whistleblower complaint and testimony before the US House of Representatives, Rick Bright was asked to step down as Director of BARDA. Bright claimed he had been removed from his post because he had insisted that "the billions of dollars allocated by Congress to address the COVID-19 pandemic" be invested "into safe and scientifically vetted solutions, and not in drugs, vaccines and other technologies that lack scientific merit." Bright was reassigned to the National Institutes of Health (NIH). The Assistant Secretary for Preparedness and Response (ASPR) at the time, who was implicated in the complaint, was Robert Kadlec.

On January 27, 2021, the U.S. Office of Special Counsel transmitted an investigative report to President Biden confirming whistleblower allegations that ASPR "misappropriated millions of dollars that Congress appropriated for [BARDA] to respond to public health emergencies like outbreaks of Ebola, Zika, and—now—COVID-19."

The investigation by the HHS Office of Inspector General (OIG) substantiated whistleblower claims that "ASPR did not always comply with Federal fiscal law when managing BARDA appropriations." In his transmittal letter, Special Counsel Henry Kerner wrote the President that he was "deeply concerned about ASPR's apparent misuse of millions of dollars in funding meant for public health emergencies like the one our country is currently facing with the COVID-19 pandemic. Equally concerning is how widespread and well-known this practice appeared to be for nearly a decade."

== See also ==
- Advanced Research Projects Agency for Health (ARPA-H)
- Public Health Security and Bioterrorism Preparedness and Response Act (H.R.3448, 107th Congress; Public Law 107-188) - original 2002 law revised and extended by PAHPA
- Pandemic and All-Hazards Preparedness Act (PAHPA) (S.3678, 109th Congress; Public Law 109-417) - 2006 law (PAHPA) authorizing BARDA
- Pandemic and All-Hazards Preparedness Reauthorization Act of 2013 (PAHPRA) (H.R. 307, 113th Congress; Public Law 113-5) - 2013 law reauthorizing BARDA
- Pandemic and All-Hazards Preparedness and Advancing Innovation Act (PAHPAI Act) (S.1379, 116th Congress; Public Law 116-22) - 2019 law reauthorizing BARDA
