= Ology Bioservices =

American biopharmaceutical company

Ology Bioservices, Inc.
- Formerly: Nanocoat Technologies (2000–2002); Nanotherapeutics, Inc. (2002–2017)
- Type: private
- Industry: Pharmaceutical industry
- Founded: 2000 in Alachua, Florida, United States
- Founder: James Talton
- Headquarters: Alachua, Florida, United States
- Key people: Peter H. Khoury, Ph.D., MBA, President & CEO
- Number of employees: 280 (2020)
- Website: Official website

Ology Bioservices (previously named Nanotherapeutics, Inc.) is a private, American biopharmaceutical company headquartered in Alachua, Florida. The company was founded with research in nanometer-scale particle technology to develop new drug delivery technologies and increase the efficacy of existing drugs. In 2016, the company changed their strategic focus and became a biologics contract development and manufacturing company (CDMO) specializing in the manufacturing of vaccines, monoclonal antibodies, recombinant proteins, virus and nucleic acids.

The company is a member of the Alliance for Biosecurity and Medical CBRN Defense Consortium.

== History ==
Nanotherapeutics was a product of the Sid Martin Biotechnology Incubator of Alachua, Florida. It was established in 2000 as Nanocoat Technologies by James Talton. The company changed its name to Nanotherapeutics in 2002.

In 2013, Nanotherapeutics was awarded an Advanced Development & Manufacturing (ADM) contract from the United States Department of Defense. The contract funded the building and outfitting of the Advanced Development & Manufacturing (ADM) 183,000 sq. ft. manufacturing facility. This laid the foundation for the eventual transition from a product development company to a Contract Development & Manufacturing Organization (CDMO).

At the end of 2014, Baxter sold its vaccine production technology based on Vero cell culture to Nanotherapeutics. The sale included developed vaccines for H5N1, H1N1 and seasonal influenza, as well as a number of investigational vaccine programs.

Nanotherapeutics was co-signatory to a letter dated July 29, 2015 from the Alliance for Biosecurity to U.S. Representatives Susan Brooks and Anna Eshoo in support of the Strengthening Public Health Emergency Response Act of 2015, which "would support preparedness for potential public health emergencies by increasing accountability and streamlining the contracting process for medical countermeasures (MCMs)."

In August 2016, Peter H. Khoury, Ph.D., MBA, joined the company as Chief Commercial Officer and was promoted within a year to President and CEO. He implemented a new business model as a dedicated biologics CDMO, which was in line with the growing needs of both the United States Government and commercial enterprises. He also led the rebranding efforts in titling the company Ology Bioservices. As Ology represents an advanced study of a subject or branch of learning (sociology, geology, neurology), the name represents the advanced work the business provides in the area of product development and manufacturing.

In October 2017, the company changed its name to Ology Bioservices.

Ology was awarded a contract in February 2020 from the United States Government to develop an advanced monoclonal antibody therapy against COVID-19.

In April 2021, Ology Bioservices was acquired by National Resilience, Inc. In June 2025, the Alachua site was closed by National Resilience. In November 2025, the ownership of the site was transferred to Strive Pharmacy.

== Business model ==
Historically, Nanotherapeutic's product development efforts were based on utilization of nanometer-scale particle technology. This placed at least some of its products in the category of medical devices, such as NanoFuse DBM, approval of which can take advantage of the FDA 510(k) expedited review route. Nanotherapeutics had a history of securing United States government grants and contracts, in particular through the Department of Defense, as a source of revenue. Like many other companies, Nanotherapeutics secured venture capital funding, and entered into product co-development alliances.

In October 2017, the company rebranded to Ology Bioservices to align the company name with the new business model.

Ology Bioservices has developed a business model that provides biologics CDMO services to the U.S. Government and to commercial companies.

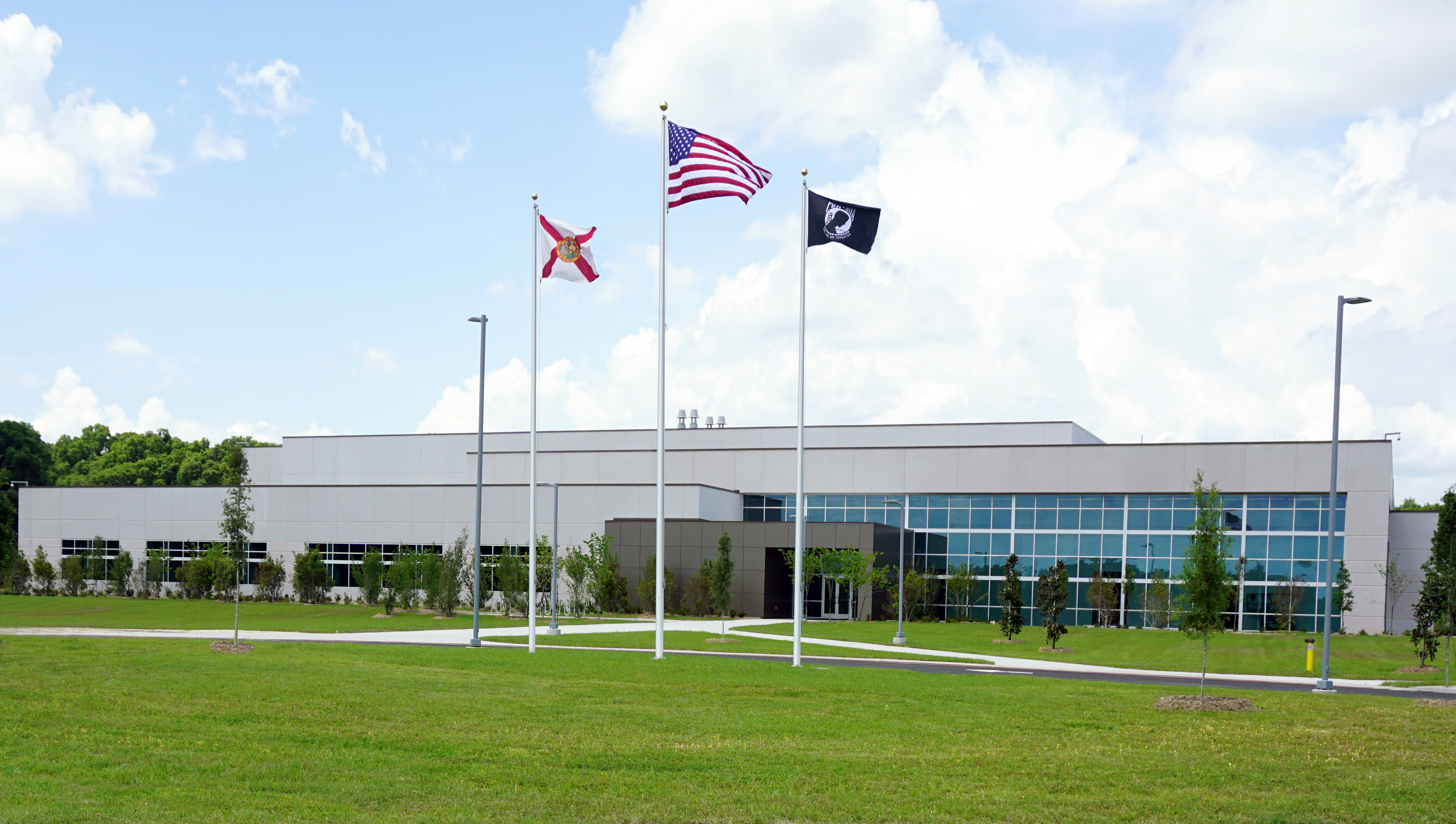
Ology Bioservices' Headquarters and Advanced Development & Manufacturing Facility

== Operations ==
Nanotherapeutics' headquarters were located in Progress Park, which also houses the Sid Martin Biotechnology Incubator in Alachua, Florida, until mid-2016.

In late-2014, the company opened an office in Frederick, Maryland to have a presence in close proximity to United States government agencies with which it frequently contracts. At the end of 2014, the company acquired a vaccine manufacturing facility in the Czech Republic from Baxter.

In 2015 Nanotherapeutics took over the anti-Botulism program from Xoma Corporation and opened a small facility in Berkeley, California to continue the projects funded by the National Institute of Allergy and Infectious Diseases, part of the National Institutes of Health. In late 2019, the Berkeley, California site was moved to Alameda, California. The new facility, once complete, will add cell therapy capabilities to Ology Bioservices' offerings.

In mid-2016, Nanotherapeutics moved into its new headquarters and manufacturing facility, the Advanced Development & Manufacturing (ADM) facility in Copeland Park, Alachua, FL.
