= Blarnalearoch =

Coordinates: 57.8564°N 5.11542°W

- Location within the Highland council area
- OS grid reference: NH152894
- Council area: Highland
- Country: Scotland
- Sovereign state: United Kingdom
- Post town: Dundonnell
- Postcode district: IV23 2
- Police: Scotland
- Fire: Scottish
- Ambulance: Scottish

Blarnalearoch is a remote crofting township situated on the west shore of Loch Broom in Garve, Ross-shire, Scottish Highlands and is in the Scottish council area of Highland.

The hamlets of Loggie and Rhiroy lie directly southeast along the coast road.
