= Pandemic and All-Hazards Preparedness Act =

U.S. Federal law

Pandemic and All Hazards Preparedness Act
- Long title: An act to amend the Public Health Service Act with respect to Public Health Security and all-hazards preparedness and response, and for other purposes.
- Enacted by: the 109th United States Congress

Citations
- Public law: 109-417

Legislative history
- Introduced in the Senate as S. 3678 by Richard Burr (R–NC) on July 18, 2006; Committee consideration by United States Senate Committee on Health, Education, Labor, and Pensions; Signed into law by President George W. Bush on December 19, 2006

On December 19, 2006, the Pandemic and All-Hazards Preparedness Act (PAHPA), Public Law No. 109-417, was signed into law by President George W. Bush. First introduced in the House by Rep. Mike Rogers (R-MI) and Rep. Anna Eshoo (D-CA), PAHPA had broad implications for the United States Department of Health and Human Services's (HHS) preparedness and response activities. Among other things, the act amended the Public Health Service Act to establish within the department a new Assistant Secretary for Preparedness and Response (ASPR); provided new authorities for a number of programs, including the advanced development and acquisitions of medical countermeasures; and called for the establishment of a quadrennial National Health Security Strategy.

The purpose of the Pandemic and All-Hazards Preparedness Act is "to improve the Nation's public health and medical preparedness and response capabilities for emergencies, whether deliberate, accidental, or natural."

The law was most recently reauthorized by Congress in 2013. After it lapsed, an amended version, the Pandemic All-Hazards Preparedness and Advancing Innovation Act, was signed into law in June 2019.

== Major program areas ==
- Biomedical Advanced Research and Development Authority (BARDA) and Medical Countermeasures
- Emergency Support Function (ESF) #8: Public Health and Medical Response: Domestic Programs
- Emergency Support Function (ESF) #8: Public Health and Medical Response: International Programs
- Grants
- At-Risk Individuals
- National Health Security Strategy (NHSS)
- Situational Awareness: Surveillance, Credentialing, and Telehealth
- Education and Training

== Provisions ==
=== Title I: National Preparedness and Response, Leadership, Organization, and Planning ===
- Amends the Public Health Service Act to require the Secretary of Health and Human Services to lead all federal public health and medical response to public health emergencies and incidents covered by the National Response Plan.
- Establishes the Assistant Secretary for Preparedness and Response within HHS to: (1) serve as an advisor to the Secretary on public health and public health emergencies; (2) oversee advanced research and development of qualified countermeasures; (3) maintain the Strategic National Stockpile; and (4) provide logistical support for public health aspects of federal responses to public health emergencies.

=== Title II: Public Health Security Preparedness ===
- Expands the program for state and local public health emergency preparedness to allow political subdivisions of states or a consortium of states to be eligible for funding. Requires the Secretary to: (1) develop and require the application of evidence-based benchmarks and objective standards that measure levels of preparedness; (2) develop and disseminate to each state the criteria for an effective state plan for responding to pandemic influenza; and (3) withhold funds from entities that fail to meet the benchmarks and performance measures or fail to submit a plan for responding to pandemic influenza that meets the criteria.
- Requires HHS to establish a nationwide public health network of systems to share information to enhance detection of, response to, and management of public health emergencies.
- Requires the National Science Advisory Board for Biosecurity to provide advice, guidance, or recommendations concerning: (1) curriculum and training for workers in maximum containment biological laboratories; and (2) periodic evaluations of laboratory capacity nationwide and assessments of future needs.

=== Title III: All-Hazards Medical Surge Capacity ===
- Requires the Secretary to conduct a joint review of the National Disaster Medical System, including a review of medical surge capacity. Transfers to the Secretary the functions of the National Disaster Medical System.
- Changes the National Advisory Committee on Children and Terrorism to the National Advisory Committee on At-Risk Individuals and Public Health Emergencies to focus on public health emergencies as they relate to at-risk individuals.
- Requires the Secretary to: (1) evaluate the benefits and feasibility of improving HHS's capacity to provide additional medical surge capacity to local communities in a public health emergency; and (2) conduct an analysis of whether there are federal facilities that could practicably be used as health care facilities in such an emergency.
- Requires the Secretary to: (1) establish a Medical Reserve Corps to provide for an adequate supply of volunteers in a federal, state, local, or tribal public health emergency; (2) link existing state verification systems to maintain a single national interoperable network of systems to verify the credentials and licenses of health care professionals who volunteer to provide health services during a public health emergency; and (3) encourage states to establish and implement mechanisms to waive the application of licensing requirements applicable to health professionals, seeking to provide medical services during a national, state, local, or tribal public health emergency.
- Repeals provisions establishing an interagency working group on the prevention, preparedness, and response to bioterrorism and other public health emergencies.
- Requires the Secretary to develop core health and medical response curricula and training by adapting applicable existing curricula and training programs to improve responses to public health emergencies.
- Allows the Secretary to establish: (1) an additional 20 officer positions in the Epidemic Intelligence Service Program; and (2) Centers for Public Health Preparedness at accredited schools of public health.
- Expands programs to improve hospital preparedness for public health emergencies to include grants to improve surge capacity.
- Requires the Secretary of Veteran Affairs to: (1) ensure the readiness of Department of Veterans Affairs medical centers for a public health emergency; (2) organize, train, and equip the staff of such medical centers to support the Secretary of HHS in the event of a public health emergency and incidents covered by the National Response Plan; and (3) provide medical logistical support to the National Disaster Medical System and the Secretary of HHS as necessary.

== Funding ==
In January 2018, the Senate Health, Education, Labor and Pensions (HELP) Committee held two separate hearings on the reauthorization of the PAHPA law. The conclusion from many witnesses who testified before the hearings is that "decreased and episodic funding from the United States government has stakeholders questioning the true commitment federal lawmakers have for sustaining the nation's preparedness and response capabilities during a catastrophic event linked to infectious diseases, natural disasters or chemical, biological, radiological or nuclear (CBRN) agents."

Many provisions in PAHPA are set to expire in September 2018 unless Congress reauthorizes them.

PAHPA expired October 1, 2018. A revised authorization, in the form of the "Pandemic and All-Hazards Preparedness and Advancing Innovation Act", was signed into law June 28, 2019.

One of the two January 2018 committee hearings focused on the private sector's relationship with providing preparedness and response capabilities. Private sector witnesses expressed concerns about the decreased or lack of federal funding for preparedness and response, saying that it's gotten to the point where the U.S. government's reputation is at stake with companies and public health and medical professionals.

"Unfortunately, over the last several years, the private sector has become more skeptical of the government's commitment to biodefense," testified Brent MacGregor of Seqirus, a global influenza vaccine developer and manufacturer.

== PAHPA reauthorization ==
Like many laws that authorize activities for federal agencies, PAHPA must be reauthorized by its expiration date in order for the law to continue taking effect. As of January 2018, most of the provisions in PAHPA are set to expire in September 2018. The Senate HELP Committee started the process of reauthorizing the law with a set of hearings beginning on January 17, 2018.

U.S. Senator Richard Burr (R-NC) sponsored both Senate versions of PAHPA authorization and reauthorization. The original bill, S. 3678, which created PAHPA, became law in 2006. In 2013, Burr sponsored the Pandemic and All-Hazards Preparedness Reauthorization Act (PAHPRA) of 2013, S. 242, which became law that same year.

On May 15, 2018, Burr introduced the Pandemic and All-Hazards Preparedness and Advancing Innovation Act of 2018 (bill number S. 2852). Original cosponsors of the bill were U.S. Senators Bob Casey (D-PA), Lamar Alexander (R-TN), and Patty Murray (D-WA).

The Alliance for Biosecurity and U.S. Chamber of Commerce wrote a joint letter to all U.S. House members urging their passage of the House version, H.R. 6378 (the Pandemic and All-Hazards Preparedness and Advancing Innovation Act of 2018). Congresswoman Susan Brooks (R-IN) introduced companion legislation in the House of Representatives (H.R. 6378). The bill increases funding to the U.S. Department of Health and Human Services to develop responses to pandemics and biological threats. Congresswoman Anna Eshoo (D-CA), who coauthored the bill with Brooks, called it "critical to our national security."

On June 15, 2018, the U.S. House Energy and Commerce Subcommittee on Oversight and Investigations held a hearing focused on discussing biopreparedness oversight issues and stressing the need to reauthorize PAHPA. One of the witnesses, Rick Bright, director of the Biomedical Advanced Research and Development Authority (BARDA), proposed that "cutting-edge testing tools" developed by private companies should go directly to doctors' offices for "rapid, regional response to outbreaks, rather than funneling samples primarily to the CDC for testing."

The chairman of the HELP Committee, Senator Lamar Alexander (R-TN), said, "I look forward to a timely, bipartisan reauthorization of this crucial legislation to ensure we are prepared to respond to natural disasters like hurricanes, and protect Americans against bioterror attacks and infectious disease outbreaks, like the Zika virus or a pandemic influenza."

The purpose of reauthorizing PAHPA is to protect public health from threats coming from exposure to infectious diseases, natural disasters or chemical, biological, radiological or nuclear (CBRN) agents.

During the committee hearing, Burr said that the U.S. is not fully prepared and that gaps have left the U.S. vulnerable to both terrorists and natural threats. He said that developing countermeasures "should be top of mind."

== See also ==
- Public Readiness and Emergency Preparedness Act (PREPA)
- Pandemic and All-Hazards Preparedness and Advancing Innovation Act (2019 version of this legislation)
