= ESAR-VHP =

The Emergency System for Advance Registration of Volunteer Health Professionals (ESAR-VHP) is a United States federal program to establish and implement guidelines and standards for the registration, credentialing, and deployment of medical professionals in the event of a large scale national emergency. The program is administered under the Assistant Secretary for Preparedness & Response (ASPR) within the Office of Public Health Emergency Preparedness of the United States Department of Health and Human Services. The ESAR-VHP standards are mandated to American states and territories, enabling an enhanced national interstate and intrastate system for using and sharing medical professionals.

== History ==
After complications arose in the use of medical volunteers following 9/11, United States Congress authorized the Health Resources and Services Administration (HRSA) to develop ESAR-VHP. In December, 2006, the Pandemic and All-Hazards Preparedness Act reassigned responsibility for ESAR-VHP to the Assistant Secretary for Preparedness and Response (ASPR) of the U.S. Department of Health and Human Services. Section 203 of the Pandemic and All-Hazards Preparedness Reauthorization Act of 2013 (H.R. 307; 113th Congress) reauthorized the ESAR-VHP for Fiscal years 2014–2018.

== See also ==
- Emergency management
- Incident Command System
- National Response Plan
- Medical Reserve Corps
