= Logy (disambiguation) =

-logy is an English suffix derived from the Greek word logía.

Logy may also refer to:

- Jan Antonín Losy (Johann Anton Logy; c. 1650–1721), Czech composer
- Logy Bay-Middle Cove-Outer Cove, a town in Newfoundland and Labrador, Canada
- Logy, the protagonist in the 2014 role-playing video game Atelier Escha & Logy: Alchemists of the Dusk Sky

== See also ==
- Logie (disambiguation)
- Ology (disambiguation)
