= Congressional Biodefense Caucus =

Caucus of the US House of Representatives

The Congressional Biodefense Caucus is a caucus within the U.S. House of Representatives “dedicated to strengthening our nation’s biodefense enterprise and national security.” The caucus was formed in March 2018 and has 27 Members of Congress in its membership. The caucus is led by its two co-chairs, Rep. Susan Brooks (R-IN) and Rep. Anna G. Eshoo (D-CA). The Alliance for Biosecurity is among supporters of the formation of the caucus.

The mission statement of the caucus is:

"To serve as an informal group for Members dedicated to strengthening our nation’s biodefense enterprise and national security against chemical, biological, radiological, and nuclear (CBRN) threats and pandemic outbreaks.”
