= United States House Committee on Ethics =

Standing committee of the United States House of Representatives

House Ethics Committee
Standing committee
- Active United States House of Representatives; 119th Congress

History
- Formed: 1967

Leadership
- Chair: Michael Guest (R); Since January 3, 2023
- Ranking Member: Mark DeSaulnier (D); Since January 3, 2025

Structure
- Seats: 10 (10 currently filled) 5/5 5/5
- Political parties: Majority (5): Republican (5); Minority (5): Democratic (5)

Jurisdiction
- Purpose: "to administer travel, gift, financial disclosure, outside income, and other regulations; advise members and staff; issue advisory opinions and investigate potential ethics violations"
- Policy areas: Ethics
- Senate counterpart: United States Senate Select Committee on Ethics

Meeting place
- 1015, Longworth House Office Building; Washington, D.C. 20515

Website
- ethics.house.gov (bipartisan)

Phone number
- (202)-225-7103

Rules
- Rule X.1(o), Rules of the House of Representatives; Ethics Committee Rules

The U.S. House Committee on Ethics, often known simply as the Ethics Committee, is one of the committees of the United States House of Representatives. Before the 112th Congress, it was known as the Committee on Standards of Official Conduct.

The House Ethics Committee has often received criticism. In response to criticism, the House created the Office of Congressional Ethics (OCE), an independent non-partisan entity established to monitor ethical conduct in the House.

== Members ==
The committee has an equal number of members from each party, unlike the rest of the committees, which are constituted with the majority of members and the committee chair coming from the party that controls the House. This even split has limited its power by giving either political party an effective veto over the actions of the committee. Members may not serve more than three terms on the committee, unless they serve as chair in their fourth term.

=== Members, 119th Congress ===
Majority	Minority
Michael Guest, Mississippi, Chair; John Rutherford, Florida (until cir. 2025); Andrew Garbarino, New York; Ashley Hinson, Iowa; Nathaniel Moran, Texas; Brad Knott, North Carolina (from January 7, 2026)	Mark DeSaulnier, California, Ranking Member; Deborah Ross, North Carolina; Glenn Ivey, Maryland; Sylvia Garcia, Texas; Suhas Subramanyam, Virginia

Resolutions electing members: H.Res. 117 (Chair), H.Res. 125 (Ranking Member), H.Res. 213 (R), H.Res. 214 (D), H.Res. 979 (Knott)

== Past committee rosters ==
=== 118th Congress ===
Majority	Minority
Michael Guest, Mississippi, Chair; David Joyce, Ohio; John Rutherford, Florida; Andrew Garbarino, New York; Michelle Fischbach, Minnesota	Susan Wild, Pennsylvania, Ranking Member; Veronica Escobar, Texas; Mark DeSaulnier, California; Deborah K. Ross, North Carolina; Glenn Ivey, Maryland

Resolutions electing members: H.Res. 79 (D), H.Res. 80 (R), H.Res. 84 (chair)

=== 117th Congress ===
Majority	Minority
Ted Deutch, Florida, Chair (until September 30, 2022); Susan Wild, Pennsylvania Chair (from September 30, 2022); Dean Phillips, Minnesota; Veronica Escobar, Texas; Mondaire Jones, New York	Jackie Walorski, Indiana, Ranking Member (until August 3, 2022); Michael Guest, Mississippi, Ranking Member (from August 19, 2022); David Joyce, Ohio; John Rutherford, Florida; Kelly Armstrong, North Dakota

Resolutions electing members: H.Res. 9 (chair), H.Res. 10 (Ranking Member), H.Res. 62 (D), H.Res. 63 (R), H.Res. 95 (R)

=== 116th Congress ===
Majority	Minority
Ted Deutch, Florida, Chair; Grace Meng, New York; Susan Wild, Pennsylvania; Dean Phillips, Minnesota; Anthony Brown, Maryland	Kenny Marchant, Texas, Ranking Member; John Ratcliffe, Texas (until May 22, 2020); George Holding, North Carolina; Jackie Walorski, Indiana; Michael Guest, Mississippi

Sources: H.Res. 31 (chair), H.Res. 32 (Ranking Member), H.Res. 113 (R), H.Res. 125 (D), H.Res. 148 (D)

=== 115th Congress ===
Majority	Minority
Susan Brooks, Indiana, Chair; Pat Meehan, Pennsylvania, until January 2018; Kenny Marchant, Texas; Leonard Lance, New Jersey; Mimi Walters, California; John Ratcliffe, Texas, from January 2018	Ted Deutch, Florida, Ranking Member; Yvette Clarke, New York; Jared Polis, Colorado; Anthony Brown, Maryland; Steve Cohen, Tennessee

Sources: H.Res. 6 (R), H.Res. 56, H.Res. 127 (D), H.Res. 685 (R)

=== 114th Congress ===
Majority	Minority
Charlie Dent, Pennsylvania, Chair; Pat Meehan, Pennsylvania; Trey Gowdy, South Carolina; Susan Brooks, Indiana; Kenny Marchant, Texas	Linda Sánchez, California, Ranking Member; Mike Capuano, Massachusetts; Yvette Clarke, New York; Ted Deutch, Florida; John B. Larson, Connecticut

Sources: H.Res. 6 (R), H.Res. 30, H.Res. 71 (D)

=== 113th Congress ===
Majority	Minority
Mike Conaway, Texas, Chair; Charlie Dent, Pennsylvania; Pat Meehan, Pennsylvania; Trey Gowdy, South Carolina; Susan Brooks, Indiana	Linda Sánchez, California, Ranking Member; Pedro Pierluisi, Puerto Rico; Mike Capuano, Massachusetts; Yvette Clarke, New York; Ted Deutch, Florida

Sources: H.Res. 6 (R), H.Res. 7, H.Res. 42 (D)

=== 112th Congress ===
Majority	Minority
Jo Bonner, Alabama, Chair; Michael McCaul, Texas; Mike Conaway, Texas; Charlie Dent, Pennsylvania; Gregg Harper, Mississippi	Linda Sánchez, California, Ranking Member; John Yarmuth, Kentucky; Donna Edwards, Maryland; Pedro Pierluisi, Puerto Rico; Joe Courtney, Connecticut

- Resolutions (H.Res. 6 and H.Res. 62) electing members to certain standing committees of the House of Representatives.

== Function ==
The Ethics Committee has many functions, but they all revolve around the standards of ethical conduct for members of the House. Under this authority, it:

- Agrees on a set of rules that regulate what behavior is considered ethical for members (rules relating to gifts, travel, campaign activities, treatment of staff, conflicts of interest, etc. are typical)
- Conducts investigations into whether members have violated these standards
- Makes recommendations to the whole House on what action, if any, should be taken as a result of the investigations (e.g. censure, expulsion from the House, or nothing if the member is found not to be violating a rule)
- Provides advice to members before they (the members) take action, so as to avoid uncertainty over ethical culpability.

== History ==
The House Committee on Ethics was established in 1967. Before its creation, the House relied on inconsistent methods for disciplining members, often using ad hoc committees or direct floor actions, but the Ethics Committee introduced a standardized framework for self-discipline, reflecting the growing relevance of matters concerning ethics since the 1960s.

As a result of the criminal investigation of Majority Leader Tom DeLay (R-TX), and lobbyist Jack Abramoff, there was pressure on the Ethics Committee to take action to admonish members involved in their activities. However, action was slow and the responsibility for impeding its progress was attributed to then-Speaker of the United States House of Representatives Dennis Hastert. When the committee did admonish Tom DeLay for a third time, Hastert removed three Republicans from the panel, including chair Joel Hefley, (R-CO). Hastert had his own personal ethical problems, such as when he failed to take action when warned about Mark Foley's sexual relationships with young congressional pages. The new chair, Doc Hastings (R-WA), acted to rein in the panel, leading to a Democratic boycott and preventing a quorum. The stalemate lasted three months until Hastings backed down. By then the committee was left broken and unable to take action in the DeLay case, the full Jack Abramoff Indian lobbying scandal, or other cases such as that of ranking Ethics Committee Democrat Jim McDermott (D-WA), who revealed violations by Newt Gingrich without authorization to the press.

On November 16, 2010, Charles Rangel (D-NY) was found guilty on 11 of the 12 charges against him by the adjudicatory subcommittee of the House Ethics Committee. They included solicitation of funds and donations for the non-profit Rangel Center from those with business before the Ways and Means Committee and the improper use of Congressional letterhead and other House resources in those solicitations; for submitting incomplete and inaccurate financial disclosures, for using an apartment as an office despite having Congressional dealings with its landlord and for failing to pay taxes on a Dominican villa.

On March 29, 2010, the OCE released a report dated January 28, 2010, that concluded Rep. Nathan Deal (R-GA) appeared to have improperly used his office staff to pressure Georgia officials to continue the exclusive, no-bid state vehicle inspection program that generated hundreds of thousands of dollars a year for his family's auto salvage business, Gainesville Salvage & Disposal. The Ethics Committee never reported or commented on any investigation of Deal. On March 1, 2010, Deal resigned his seat saying he was concentrating on a run for governor, which excluded him from the Office of Congressional Ethics' jurisdiction. Besides Deal, another Georgia Republican, Rep. Paul Broun, accused of paying a consultant with taxpayer funds in his 2014 bid for a U.S. Senate race, avoided answering to charges by losing that primary and leaving office.

The OCE discovered, via a difficult investigation, that a 2013 trip nine members took to Azerbaijan was paid for by funds laundered for the purpose from the Azerbaijani government. The Ethics committee had asked the OCE to drop the case, only approving release of a summary finding in 2015, deeming the full report "not appropriate for release because the referral followed the OCE Board’s decision not to cease its investigations."

On January 2, 2017, one day before the 115th United States Congress was scheduled to convene for its first session, the House Republican majority voted 119–74 to effectively place the OCE under direct control of the House Ethics Committee, making any subsequent reviews of possible violations of criminal law by Congressional members dependent upon approval following referral to the Ethics Committee itself, or to federal law enforcement agencies. The new rules would have prevented the OCE from independently releasing public statements on pending or completed investigations. House Judiciary Committee chair Bob Goodlatte (R-Va.) defended the action on the rules amendment saying it "builds upon and strengthens the existing Office of Congressional Ethics by maintaining its primary area of focus of accepting and reviewing complaints from the public and referring them, if appropriate, to the Committee on Ethics." House Republicans reversed their plan to gut the OCE less than 24 hours after the initial vote, under bipartisan pressure from Representatives, their constituents and the president-elect, Donald Trump. In addition to negative Trump tweets, criticism was widespread including from Judicial Watch, the Project on Government Oversight, former Representative Bob Ney (R-OH), who was convicted of receiving bribes, and Abramoff, the lobbyist who provided such bribes.

== Committee leadership ==
Former committee chairs and ranking members are below.

Chairs
Name	Party	State	Start	End
Charles Bennett	Democratic	Florida	1966	1967
Melvin Price	Democratic	Illinois	1967	1977
John Flynt	Democratic	Georgia	1977	1979
Charles Bennett	Democratic	Florida	1979	1981
Louis Stokes	Democratic	Ohio	1981	1985
Julian Dixon	Democratic	California	1985	1991
Louis Stokes	Democratic	Ohio	1991	1993
Jim McDermott	Democratic	Washington	1993	1995
Nancy Johnson	Republican	Connecticut	1995	1997
Jim Hansen	Republican	Utah	1997	1999
Lamar Smith	Republican	Texas	1999	2001
Joel Hefley	Republican	Colorado	2001	2005
Doc Hastings	Republican	Washington	2005	2007
Stephanie Tubbs Jones	Democratic	Ohio	2007	2008
Gene Green; Acting	Democratic	Texas	2008	2009
Zoe Lofgren	Democratic	California	2009	2011
Jo Bonner	Republican	Alabama	2011	2013
Mike Conaway	Republican	Texas	2013	2015
Charlie Dent	Republican	Pennsylvania	2015	2017
Susan Brooks	Republican	Indiana	2017	2019
Ted Deutch	Democratic	Florida	2019	2022
Susan Wild; Acting	Democratic	Pennsylvania	2022	2023
Michael Guest	Republican	Mississippi	2023	present

Ranking members
Name	Party	State	Start	End
Harold Gross	Republican	Iowa	1966	1967
Charles Halleck	Republican	Indiana	1967	1969
Leslie Arends	Republican	Illinois	1969	
Jackson Betts	Republican	Ohio	1969	1973
Jimmy Quillen	Republican	Tennessee	1973	1975
Floyd Spence	Republican	South Carolina	1975	1988
John Myers	Republican	Indiana	1988	1991
Jim Hansen	Republican	Utah	1991	1993
Fred Grandy	Republican	Iowa	1993	1995
Jim McDermott	Democratic	Washington	1995	1997
Howard Berman	Democratic	California	1997	2005
Alan Mollohan	Democratic	West Virginia	2005	2006
Howard Berman	Democratic	California	2006	2007
Doc Hastings	Republican	Washington	2007	2009
Jo Bonner	Republican	Alabama	2009	2011
Zoe Lofgren	Democratic	California	2011	
Linda Sánchez	Democratic	California	2011	2019
Kenny Marchant	Republican	Texas	2019	2021
Jackie Walorski	Republican	Indiana	2021	2022
Michael Guest; Acting	Republican	Mississippi	2022	2023
Susan Wild	Democratic	Pennsylvania	2023	2025
Mark DeSaulnier	Democratic	California	2025	present

== See also ==
- United States Senate Select Committee on Ethics
- List of United States House of Representatives committees
