= Alliance for Biosecurity =

- Established: 2005
- Mission: promote a strong public-private relationship
- Focus: National security threats such as, bioterrorism pathogens infectious diseases
- Location: Washington, D.C.
- Website: www.allianceforbiosecurity.com

The Alliance for Biosecurity is a consortium of companies that develop products to respond to national security threats, including bioterrorism pathogens and emerging infectious diseases. The consortium, which is headquartered in Washington DC, spent over 1.8 million dollars on lobbying efforts from 2020 through 2024.

== Background ==
The United States faces risks to national security posed by the danger of bioterrorism or a destabilizing infectious disease pandemic. The Alliance for Biosecurity is a group of pharmaceutical and biotechnology companies that work to create preventive measures and treatments for severe infectious diseases.

Within the U.S. federal government, the Biomedical Advanced Research and Development Authority (BARDA) and the Project BioShield Special Reserve Fund (SRF) provide funding to research, develop, and procure a medicines to control epidemics.

== History ==
The Alliance for Biosecurity was formed in 2005. Its purpose was to build a partnership between government and private sector biotechnology and pharmaceutical companies working in the biodefense space. The Center for Biosecurity, a nonprofit multidisciplinary organization of physicians public health professionals and scientists, was an organizer of the alliance and participates in it. Together, the two groups have provided congressional testimony and authored letters to Congress.

In 2018, Congress passed the annual Labor, Health and Human Services, and Education appropriations bill before the end of the fiscal year for the first time in over 20 years. Congress also passed a Department of Defense appropriations bill before the end of the fiscal year for the first time in 10 years. The alliance supported passage of both bills. Key funding in the bills included:

- Project BioShield Special Reserve Fund (SRF): The fund received a $25 million increase. The SRF was first funded in 2004 and receives an annualized funding level of around $510 million since 2004. The current funding level is $735 million. The program creates public-private partnerships to advance the development of over 50 million doses of drugs against anthrax, smallpox, botulinum toxin and radiological threats.
- Project BioShield: This program creates incentives for companies to invest in R&D in products for biodefense, because no commercial markets for such projects exist.

== Mission ==
The Alliance for Biosecurity is a coalition of biopharmaceutical companies and laboratory/academic partners that promotes a strong public-private partnership to ensure medical countermeasures are available to protect public health and enhance national health security. The Alliance advocates for public policies and funding to support the rapid development, production, stockpiling, and distribution of critically needed medical countermeasures.

== Legislative support ==
The alliance has supported the following legislation:

- 21st Century Cures Act - legislation passed in the U.S. Senate that promotes innovation and efficiency in the development of new medical countermeasures
- Medical Countermeasures Innovation Act of 2015 - legislation that would encourage the development of medical countermeasures, including drugs, devices and preventative treatments that could be used after a biological terrorist attack or global pandemic
- Pandemic and All-Hazards Preparedness and Advancing Innovation Act of 2018 (H.R. 6378) - legislation that would reauthorize the Pandemic and All-Hazards Preparedness Act (PAHPA) before its expiration on September 30, 2018. The alliance sent a letter with the U.S. Chamber of Commerce to each member of the House of Representatives urging its passage.
- Strengthening Public Health Emergency Response Act - legislation that creates new research incentives, improves transparency, and creates "predictable and flexible contracting"

The alliance also gives out awards to Congress. For example, in October 2017 it awarded eight Members of Congress, such as Maryland Congressman Dutch Ruppersberger, with its "Congressional Biosecurity Champion Award," which honors elected officials who work to improve how the U.S. can prevent and fight biosecurity threats. In 2019, it gave this award to Rep. Jaime Herrera Beutler (R-WA).

== Organization ==
=== Membership ===
The Alliance for Biosecurity is made up of the following biotechnology companies and university research labs:

- Bavarian Nordic
- Baxter International
- BioCryst
- iBio / CC-Pharming (former)
- Chimerix
- Coherus
- CUBRC, Inc.
- Elusys Therapeutics, Inc.
- Emerald Bioscience (former)
- Emergent BioSolutions
- GSK
- Hawaii Biotech (former)
- Heat Biologics
- Johnson & Johnson/Janssen
- Lovelace Respiratory Research Institute (former)
- Meridian Medical Technologies/Pfizer
- Nanotherapeutics
- Neumedicines (former)
- Novartis Vaccines (former)
- Opiant
- Pfenex
- Roche
- Romark Laboratories, L.C. (former)
- Sanofi Pasteur (former)
- SCYNEXIS
- Seqirus (former)
- Siga Technologies, Inc.
- Soligenix, Inc.
- The Texas A&M University System
- Tonix Pharmaceuticals
- University of Texas Medical Branch
- Venatorx Pharmaceuticals

Law firm Squire Patton Boggs serves as secretariat for the alliance.

=== Partners and collaborations ===
The alliance is a participating member of the Virtual Biosecurity Center, an initiative of the Federation of American Scientists.

== See also ==
- 9/11 Commission
- Biological hazard
- Biological warfare
- Bioterrorism
- Blue Ribbon Study Panel on Biodefense
- Congressional Biodefense Caucus
- Pandemic influenza
- Terrorism
- United States biological defense program
