= Strengthening Public Health Emergency Response Act of 2015 =

Bill introduced by US House of Representatives

- Long title: To amend the Public Health Service Act to ensure preparedness for chemical, radiological, biological, and nuclear threats, and for other purposes.
- Announced in: the 114th United States Congress
- Sponsored by: U.S. Representative Susan Brooks
- Number of co-sponsors: 47

Codification
- Acts affected: Public Health Service Act; Federal Food, Drug, and Cosmetic Act
- Agencies affected: Department of Health and Human Services (HHS); Biomedical Advanced Research and Development Authority (BARDA); Centers for Disease Control and Prevention

Legislative history
- Introduced in the House as H.R. 3299 by Susan Brooks on July 29, 2015; Committee consideration by U.S. House Energy and Commerce Committee

The Strengthening Public Health Emergency Response Act of 2015, H.R. 3299, is a bill introduced in the U.S. House of Representatives that would streamline government decisions and provide incentives for vaccines and treatment of dangerous pathogens and diseases. The bill was introduced by Representatives Susan Brooks (R-IN) and Anna Eshoo (D-CA).

H.R. 3299 would improve the United States' emergency preparedness by increasing administrative efficiency within the Office of Assistant Secretary for Preparedness and Response ("ASPR") in the U.S. Department of Health and Human Services ("HHS"). It would also provide incentives for companies to develop medical countermeasures for public health emergencies and biochemical attacks.

== Background ==
Brooks and Eshoo introduced the bill in response to a report prepared in October 2015 by the Blue Ribbon Study Panel on Biodefense. The report said:

The nation has not come to fully appreciate the severity of the biological threat and our leaders have not demonstrated the political will to fully address it. We must address these shortcomings by prioritizing the following areas: 1). coordination and accountability among federal departments and agencies; 2) collaboration between federal and non-federal stakeholders; and 3) innovation that addresses both lingering and novel problems.

== Legislative details ==
The Public Health Service Act authorizes the government to spend funds on programs to prepare communities and hospitals for public health emergencies. H.R. 3299 would require that at least 97 percent of those funds be used for awards (grants).

The legislation would require that the Department of Health and Human Services (HHS) develop certain procedures concerning medical countermeasures. Specifically, HHS would need to coordinate stockpiling of countermeasures between the Biomedical Advanced Research and Development Authority (BARDA) and Centers for Disease Control and Prevention.

Additionally, the bill would amend the Federal Food, Drug, and Cosmetic Act to by adding threatening diseases and other agents to the government's list of tropical diseases under the Priority Review Voucher program. The program gives a voucher for fast-track approval by the FDA to companies that sponsor a new drug or biological product that would prevent or treat a disease contained on the list of tropical diseases.

The legislation would create an incentive program that awards vouchers for priority review to companies that get approval from the Food and Drug Administration (FDA) for specific drugs that can be used to counter the effects of biological, chemical, radiological, or nuclear agents. The bill also would make several changes to the processes used by the government to procure medical countermeasures in HHS. Additionally, the Government Accountability Office (GAO) would be required to report on programs to improve state, local, and hospital preparedness.

The Congressional Budget Office estimated that implementing H.R. 3299 would cost $20 million over the 2017-2021 period, assuming appropriation of the necessary amounts.

== See also ==
- Biosecurity in the United States
- Biotechnology
- Bioterrorism
