= Social Media Working Group Act of 2014 =

- Long title: To amend the Homeland Security Act of 2002 to authorize the Department of Homeland Security to establish a social media working group, and for other purposes.
- Announced in: the 113th United States Congress
- Sponsored by: Rep. Susan W. Brooks (R, IN-5)
- Number of co-sponsors: 3

Codification
- U.S.C. sections affected: 6 U.S.C. § 181 et seq., 5 U.S.C. § {{{2}}}
- Agencies affected: United States Forest Service, National Oceanic and Atmospheric Administration, Centers for Disease Control and Prevention, United States Geological Survey, Under Secretary of Homeland Security for Science and Technology, Federal Emergency Management Agency, Department of Homeland Security

Legislative history
- Introduced in the House as H.R. 4263 by Rep. Susan W. Brooks (R, IN-5) on March 14, 2014; Committee consideration by United States House Committee on Homeland Security, United States House Homeland Security Subcommittee on Emergency Preparedness, Response, and Communications; Passed the House on July 8, 2014 (Roll Call Vote 369: 375-19)

The Social Media Working Group Act of 2014 (H.R. 4263) is a bill that would direct the United States Secretary of Homeland Security to establish within the United States Department of Homeland Security (DHS) a social media working group (the Group) to provide guidance and best practices to the emergency preparedness and response community on the use of social media technologies before, during, and after a terrorist attack.

The bill was introduced into the United States House of Representatives during the 113th United States Congress.

== Background ==
=== Social media ===
Social media is the social interaction among people in which they create, share or exchange information and ideas in virtual communities and networks. Andreas Kaplan and Michael Haenlein define social media as "a group of Internet-based applications that build on the ideological and technological foundations of Web 2.0, and that allow the creation and exchange of user-generated content." Furthermore, social media depend on mobile and web-based technologies to create highly interactive platforms through which individuals and communities share, co-create, discuss, and modify user-generated content. They introduce substantial and pervasive changes to communication between organizations, communities, and individuals.

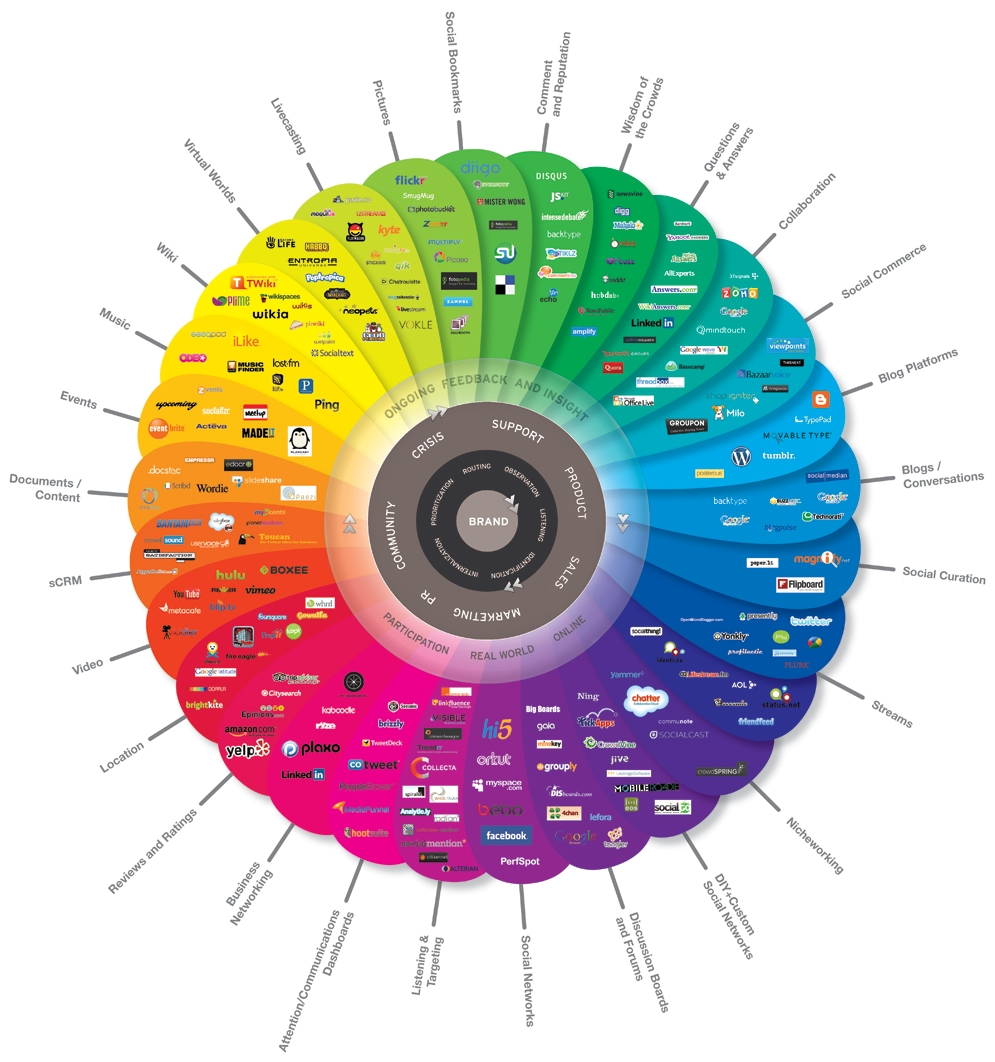
Diagram depicting the many different types of social media

Social media differ from traditional or industrial media in many ways, including quality, reach, frequency, usability, immediacy, and permanence.

=== Virtual Social Media Working Group ===
First responders have increasingly used social media in emergency response and recovery operations. Social media tools are used to connect with citizens after a disaster and share information.

The Virtual Social Media Working group (VSMWG) is an online platform that gives advice to first responders on how to safely and effectively use social media in emergency response operations. The working group is made up of subject matter experts from across the U.S. It was created by DHS in December 2010 and gives first responders guidance and best practices regarding the use of social media during emergencies. The DHS S&T and the VSMWG work with local and state governments, academics and nonprofits. Meetings of the VSMWG are chaired by the Under Secretary of Homeland Security for Science and Technology.

== Provisions of the bill ==
This summary is based largely on the summary provided by the Congressional Research Service, a public domain source.

The Social Media Working Group Act of 2014 would amend the Homeland Security Act of 2002 to direct the United States Secretary of Homeland Security to establish within the United States Department of Homeland Security (DHS) a social media working group (the Group) to provide guidance and best practices to the emergency preparedness and response community on the use of social media technologies before, during, and after a terrorist attack.

The bill would require the Group to submit an annual report that includes: (1) a review of current and emerging social media technologies being used to support preparedness and response activities related to terrorist attacks, of best practices and lessons learned on the use of social media during the response to terrorist attacks that occurred during the period covered by the report, and of available training for government officials on the use of social media in response to a terrorist attack; (2) recommendations to improve DHS's use of social media and to improve information sharing among DHS and its components and among state and local governments; and (3) a summary of coordination efforts with the private sector to discuss and resolve legal, operational, technical, privacy, and security concerns.

== Congressional Budget Office report ==
This summary is based largely on the summary provided by the Congressional Budget Office, as ordered reported by the House Committee on Homeland Security on June 11, 2014. This is a public domain source.

H.R. 4263 would direct the Department of Homeland Security (DHS) to establish a working group to provide guidance and best practices on the use of social media technologies, specifically during a terrorist attack or other emergency. The group would prepare guidance for the emergency preparedness and response community. The bill would define the membership of the working group, which would include more than 20 experts from federal, state, local, and tribal governments along with nongovernmental organizations. The working group would be exempt from the Federal Advisory Committee Act and would be authorized to hold virtual meetings to fulfill the requirement to meet twice a year. The working group would be required to submit an annual report on emerging trends and best practices for emergency response through social media.

Based on the cost of similar activities carried out under the DHS Acquisition and Accountability Efficiency Act and the Critical Infrastructure Research and Development Advancement Act of 2013, the Congressional Budget Office (CBO) estimates that the new DHS responsibilities and the annual report required by H.R. 4263 would cost a total of less than $500,000 annually, assuming the availability of appropriated funds. Enacting the legislation would not affect direct spending or revenues; therefore, pay-as-you-go procedures do not apply.

H.R. 4263 contains no intergovernmental or private-sector mandates as defined in the Unfunded Mandates Reform Act and would impose no costs on state, local, or tribal governments.

== Procedural history ==
The Social Media Working Group Act of 2014 was introduced into the United States House of Representatives on March 14, 2014, by Rep. Susan W. Brooks (R, IN-5). It was referred to the United States House Committee on Homeland Security and the United States House Homeland Security Subcommittee on Emergency Preparedness, Response, and Communications. On June 19, 2014, it was reported (amended) alongside House Report 113-480. On July 8, 2014, the House voted in Roll Call Vote 369 to pass the bill 375–19.

== Debate and discussion ==
Nate Elliott, a social media expert at Forrester Research, explains that "the hope is when government or another authority tweets something, people will share it for them," but that this often doesn't happen. This problem, that "messages wash away very quickly," is the reason that the federal government is trying to formulate a better social media strategy.

Rep. Steven Palazzo (R-MS), who co-sponsored the bill, stated that "social media has played a crucial role in emergency preparedness and response in Mississippi, including during disasters like Hurricane Isaac and the tornadoes that hit the Hattiesburg area a little over a year ago." He said that their goal with the bill was to "build upon existing public-private partnerships and use social media in a more strategic way in order to help save lives and property."

== See also ==
- List of bills in the 113th United States Congress
