= Logie =

Logie may refer to:

== Places in Scotland ==
- Logie, Dundee, a residential area in the City of Dundee
- Logie, Fife, a village and parish of east Fife
- Logie Coldstone, an Aberdeenshire village north of the River Dee
- Logie House Garden, Logie Estate, Logie, Forres, Moray, IV36 2QN
- Logie Kirk, Stirlingshire

== People ==
=== By surname ===
- George Logie-Smith (1914–2007), an Australian conductor, music examiner, and music educator
- Gus Logie (born 1960), a Trinidad and Tobago cricketer and former wicketkeeper for the West Indies cricket team
- John H. Logie, Mayor of Grand Rapids, Michigan from 1992 to 2003
- Jimmy Logie (1919–1984), Scottish footballer
- Willie Logie (1932–2016), Scottish footballer
- Willy Logie, a retired Belgian professional darts player
- W. S. Loggie

=== By given name ===
- James Logie Robertson (1846–1922), a literary scholar, editor and author, who also used the pen name Hugh Haliburton
- John Logie Baird, the inventor of television
- Logie Bruce Lockhart (1921–2020), a British writer and journalist, formerly a Scottish rugby union player and headmaster of Gresham's School
- Thomas Logie MacDonald (1901–1973), Scottish astronomer and politician and eponym of lunar crater McDonald

== Other uses ==
- Logie Awards, the Australian television industry awards
- "The Laird O Logie", children's ballad
- Logie, a House in Wallace High School, Stirling

== See also ==
- Logy (disambiguation)
