= J. A. Loggie =

American politician

Member of the Washington House of Representatives for the 43rd district
- In office 1895–1897

Personal details
- Born: June 27, 1862 New Brunswick, British North America
- Died: June 30, 1936 (aged 74) Bellingham, Washington, United States
- Party: Republican

James Alexander Loggie (June 27, 1862 – June 30, 1936) was an American politician in the state of Washington. He served in the Washington House of Representatives from 1895 to 1897.
