= Meridian Medical Technologies =

Pharmaceutical company that manufactures antidotes for chemical weapons

Meridian Medical Technologies, LLC
- Formerly: Brunswick Biomedical Corporation (1968-November 1996)
- Type: Private
- Industry: Medical equipment
- Founded: 1968; 58 years ago
- Headquarters: Columbia, Maryland, U.S.
- Products: Autoinjectors
- Number of employees: 452
- Website: meridianmeds.com

Meridian Medical Technologies, LLC is an American company which specialized primarily in developing and manufacturing antidotes for chemical weapons.

It was founded in 1968 as Brunswick Biomedical Corporation and changed its name in November 1996 when it merged with Survival Technology, Inc. Survival Technology, Inc. had been the employer of Sheldon Kaplan, who had invented various kinds of autoinjectors, including the epinephrine autoinjector, EpiPen. The EpiPen was marketed and distributed by Dey LP, a subsidiary of Merck KGaA.

King Pharmaceuticals acquired Meridian in 2003, and the company became part of Pfizer when Pfizer acquired all of King's assets through a process that started in 2010 and was completed in 2011.

Meridian is a member of the Alliance for Biosecurity, which is a group of companies that work towards preventing and treating severe infectious diseases, especially those that present global security challenges.

Altaris Capital Partners, LLC entered into an agreement to acquire Meridian Medical Technologies (“Meridian”) from Pfizer on November 2, 2021, and completed the acquisition on January 4, 2022.

On November 14, 2022, Altaris LLC announced it will combine Meridian with Kindeva Drug Delivery, another operating company owned by Altaris.

Meridian Medical currently has plans to expand operations in Bridgeton, Missouri, and add new production lines.
