= Helen Loggie =

Helen Amanda Loggie (1895 in Bellingham, Washington – 1976) was a U.S. artist, primarily known for her etchings of trees and coastlines of the Pacific Northwest.

== Life ==
Loggie attended Smith College in Massachusetts for two years. Between 1916 and 1924, she studied at the Art Students League of New York, enrolling in her first formal classes in drawing and painting with the intention of becoming a portrait painter. While at the Arts Students League she studied with George Luks and Robert Henri and began to develop a style which rejected such modernist themes as those trumpeted by the Ashcan School. She toured Europe in 1926–27 where she made an extensive body of sketches and paintings. Upon returning to New York, Loggie undertook private study with prominent etcher and printer John Taylor Arms, beginning a 25-year collaboration.

In 1930, Loggie returned to Bellingham permanently. She built a house on the shores of Eastsound, Orcas Island. There, she immersed herself in the rugged landscape around her and fully expressed the artistic vision that had been maturing within. Loggie's small, highly detailed pencil drawings and etchings reflect her deep commitment, determination and skill in capturing the beauty she saw in nature.

== Exhibitions ==
=== Group exhibitions ===
- Brooklyn Society of Etchers (1931)
- Society of American Etchers, New York (7 exhibits 1932–1947)
- National Academy of Design, New York (1934, regularly between 1949–1969)
- Sweden American Exhibition of Graphic Arts, Paris International Exhibition (1937)
- Kennedy Galleries, New York (1938)
- New York World's Fair (1939)
- American National Committee of Engraving, Pan-American traveling exhibit (1940)
- Corcoran Gallery of Art, Washington DC (1940)
- Carnegie Institute, Pittsburgh (1941)
- Metropolitan Museum of Art, New York (1942)
- Whitney Museum of American Art, New York (1942)
- American Federation of Arts at The Library of Congress (1942, 1943, 1952)
- Art Students League Diamond Jubilee (1951)
- American Federation of Arts traveling exhibition (1953–54)
- American Academy of Arts and Letters, New York (1953)
- Smithsonian Institution traveling exhibition (1953–54)
- The Royal Society of Painters, Etchers and Engravers, London (1954)

=== One-person exhibitions ===
- Kleeman Galleries, New York (1938)
- Seattle Art Museum (1939)
- Western Washington College of Education, Bellingham, WA (1942, 1956, 1993)
- Smithsonian Institution, Washington DC (1944)
- Washington State Historical Society, Olympia (1959)
- Norfolk Museum of Arts and Sciences, Virginia (1965)
- Whatcom Museum of History and Art, Bellingham WA (1979)

=== Representation in permanent collections ===
- Library of Congress
- The Metropolitan Museum of Art
- Philadelphia Museum of Art
- Lyman Allyn Art Museum
- Museum of Fine Arts, Houston
- University of Nebraska
- Portland Art Museum
- Frye Art Museum, Seattle
- Western Washington University
- National Museum, Stockholm
- University of Glasgow
- British Museum, London

== Major prizes and recognition ==
- Associate, National Academy of Design (1949)
- Academician, National Academy of Design (1957, 1971)
- National Academy of Design prize for graphic art (1960, 1964)
- Philadelphia Sketch Club – 1st prize (1960)
- June Rockefeller award (1960)
- American Artists Professional League – Gold Medal for drawing (1960)
- Connecticut Academy – 1st Prize (1961)
- National Academy of Design Samuel Finley Breese Morse Medal (1969)
- Washington State Governor’s Art Award (1971)

Helen Loggie's archives, consisting of numerous prints and drawings, reside in the collection at the Western Gallery of Art at Western Washington University in Bellingham, Washington.

As of 2020, a comprehensive collection of Loggie's work, including ephemera, drawings, etchings, pastels and oils are on exhibit at the Helen Loggie Museum of Art in Bellingham, Washington. The museum is housed in the former Territorial Courthouse, built in 1858 and listed on the National Register of Historic Places as the oldest masonry building in Washington state. The museum is privately held.
