= Obiltoxaximab =

Monoclonal antibody

Monoclonal antibody
- Type: Whole antibody
- Source: Chimeric (mouse/human)
- Target: Bacillus anthracis anthrax

Clinical data
- Trade names: Anthim, Nyxthracis, others
- Other names: ETI-204
- AHFS/Drugs.com: Monograph
- License data: US DailyMed: Obiltoxaximab
- Routes of administration: Intravenous
- ATC code: J06BC04 (WHO)

Legal status
- Legal status: CA: ℞-only / Schedule D; US: ℞-only; EU: Rx-only

Identifiers
- CAS Number: 1351337-07-9
- DrugBank: DB05336
- ChemSpider: None
- UNII: 29Z5DNL48C
- KEGG: D10776

Chemical and physical data
- Formula: C_{6444}H_{9994}N_{1734}O_{2022}S_{44}
- Molar mass: 145521.59 g·mol^{−1}

Obiltoxaximab, sold under the brand name Anthim among others, is a monoclonal antibody medication designed for the treatment of exposure to Bacillus anthracis spores (etiologic agent of anthrax).

The medication was developed by Elusys Therapeutics, Inc.

== Medical uses ==
Obiltoxaximab is indicated in combination with appropriate antibacterial drugs in all age groups for treatment of inhalational anthrax due to Bacillus anthracis. It is also indicated in all age groups for post-exposure prophylaxis of inhalational anthrax when alternative therapies are not appropriate or are not available.

== Adverse effects ==
The most frequently reported adverse reactions were headache, pruritus, upper respiratory tract infections, cough, urticaria, nasal congestion, pain in extremity, and injection site reactions such as bruising at site of IV placement, infusion site swelling and infusion site pain.

== Legal status ==
In March 2016, obiltoxaximab was approved by the U.S. Food and Drug Administration (FDA) for the treatment and prophylaxis of inhalational anthrax.

In September 2020, the Committee for Medicinal Products for Human Use (CHMP) of the European Medicines Agency (EMA) adopted a positive opinion, recommending the granting of a marketing authorization under exceptional circumstances for obiltoxaximab, intended for the treatment or post-exposure prophylaxis of inhalational anthrax. The applicant for this medicinal product is SFL Pharmaceuticals Deutschland GmbH. It was approved for medical use in the European Union in November 2020.
