= Elusys Therapeutics =

- Company type: Private company
- Founded: 1998
- Headquarters: Pine Brook, New Jersey
- Key people: Dr. Elizabeth G. Posillico (Chief Executive Officer, President and Director)
- Website: elusys.com

Elusys Therapeutics is a biopharmaceutical company founded in Pine Brook, New Jersey in 1998. The company specializes in the development of antibodies for the treatment infectious diseases. The antibodies are developed from protein complexes called heteropolymers which can bind to specific pathogens on one side and red blood cells on the other side.

The pathogens will be dragged to the liver where they will be destroyed. The antibodies have a potential to be used for the treatments of many blood-borne diseases. Currently, the company focuses on the late-stage clinical trials of Anthim (Obiltoxaximab) to be used for treatment and prevention of inhaled anthrax.

== History ==
Ronald P. Taylor, a professor of biochemistry and molecular genetics at the University of Virginia developed protein complexes called heteropolymers that mimic the natural process of white and red blood cells in clearing out the disease off the bloodstream.

The heteropolymers have specific binding that can bind to specific pathogens on one side and red blood cells on the other side. The red blood cells with the attached pathogens are delivered to the liver to be destroyed. In animal testing, the method can clear out pathogens within 2 hours.

Taylor's research were partially funded by the National Institutes of Health and the Defense Advanced Research Projects Agency Additional funding was arranged by Seed-One Ventures, a venture capital company, through the formation of Elusys Therapeutics to raise several million dollars. Jeff Wolf, the founding CEO Elusys and Managing Partner of Seed-One, selected Stephen Sudovar as the CEO of Elusys. Sudovar was the former President of Roche Laboratories a division of Hoffmann-La Roche. Wolf also arranged to have Elusys' board of directors made up of people with prior experience from top global pharmaceutical companies and Food and Drug Administration (FDA). As a startup, the company tested its first heteropolymers by using two chemically linked monoclonal antibodies for the treatment of lupus.

Elusys is a member of the Alliance for Biosecurity. The alliance is a group of companies and scholars that work to promote the development of vaccines and other measures that can be used in the case of a pandemic or bioterrorism attack.

== Treatment ==
Anthim is monoclonal antibody designed for the treatment of exposure to Bacillus anthracis spores (etiologic agent of anthrax).

Elusys initially collaborated with University of Texas at Austin and United States Army Medical Research Institute of Infectious Diseases (USAMRIID) in the development of Anthim. With the bioterrorism risk of anthrax, the United States Department of Health and Human Services awarded a five-year contract in 2010 valued at $143 million to develop IV-based drug to treat patients who are already infected by anthrax. In 2011, the company was awarded with an additional five-year contract valued at $68.9 million to develop intramuscular injection for anthrax prevention measure. In 2012, the company was awarded additional $50.2 million to test the efficacy of the treatment.

The Biologics License Application for both intravenous and intramuscular administrations was accepted by the FDA in June 2015 with efficacy data of animal models and safety data from human volunteers. In March 2016, Anthim was approved to treat inhalational anthrax in conjunction with appropriate antibacterial drugs, also for prevention when alternative therapies are not available or appropriate.

In November 2015, the company received a five-year contract of $44.9 million for the production and future delivery of Anthim to the Strategic National Stockpile.
