= Susan Brooks =

American politician (born 1960)

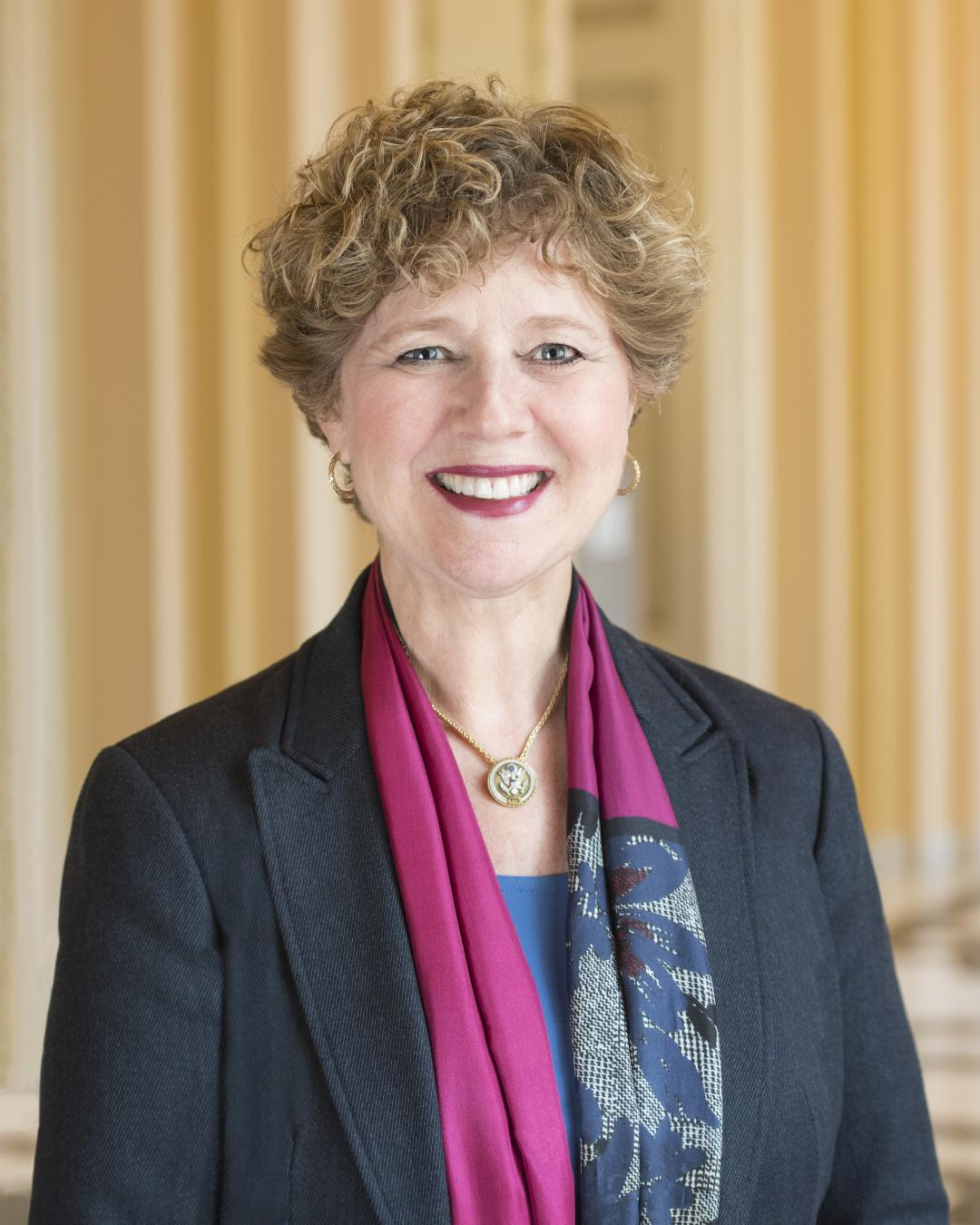

Chair of the House Ethics Committee
- In office January 3, 2017 – January 3, 2019
- Preceded by: Charlie Dent
- Succeeded by: Ted Deutch

Member of the U.S. House of Representatives from Indiana's 5th district
- In office January 3, 2013 – January 3, 2021
- Preceded by: Dan Burton
- Succeeded by: Victoria Spartz

United States Attorney for the Southern District of Indiana
- In office October 12, 2001 – October 1, 2007
- President: George W. Bush
- Preceded by: Judith Stewart
- Succeeded by: Timothy Morrison

Personal details
- Born: Susan Lynn Wiant; August 25, 1960 (age 66) Fort Wayne, Indiana, U.S.
- Party: Republican
- Spouse: David Brooks
- Children: 2
- Education: Miami University (BA); Indiana University, Indianapolis (JD)
- Brooks's voice Brooks supporting legislation to allow terminally ill patients to test experimental drugs. Recorded March 21, 2018

Susan Lynn Brooks (née Wiant) (born August 25, 1960) is an American prosecutor and politician. She is a Republican and the former U.S. representative for Indiana's 5th congressional district. She was elected in 2012. The district includes the northern fifth of Indianapolis, as well as many of the city's affluent northern and eastern suburbs. Brooks served as the United States Attorney for the Southern District of Indiana from 2001 to 2007.

She was a candidate to replace Mike Pence in the 2016 Indiana gubernatorial election after he withdrew from the race to be Donald Trump's running mate in the 2016 U.S. presidential election. However, Indiana Republicans gave the nomination to Eric Holcomb, Indiana's lieutenant governor and Pence's second in command during his administration, who was then elected governor. In the 116th Congress, she was a co-chair of the House moderate Republican faction, the Tuesday Group, alongside John Katko and Fred Upton. She is also recruitment chair for the National Republican Congressional Committee.

On June 14, 2019, Brooks announced that she would not run for reelection to the U.S. House of Representatives in 2020.

== Early life, education, and early law career ==
Brooks was born to Robert and Marilyn Wiant in Fort Wayne, Indiana. She was raised in Fort Wayne and graduated from Homestead High School in 1978. She earned a B.A. degree from Miami University, Ohio, where she was a part of the sorority Alpha Omicron Pi, and her J.D. degree from the Indiana University Robert H. McKinney School of Law. She practiced criminal defense law from 1985 to 1997.

== Deputy Mayor of Indianapolis (1998–1999) ==
She was appointed by Mayor Stephen Goldsmith in 1998 to be deputy mayor. She monitored the police, fire, and emergency response activities. She focused on crime, the criminal justice system, and social welfare issues.

She served on the following boards:

- Marion County Community Corrections
- Indianapolis Downtown, Inc.
- Indianapolis Violence Reduction Partnership
- Greater Indianapolis Progress Committee
- Race Relations Leadership Network Committee
- Indiana University/Purdue University at Indianapolis Board of Advisors
- Marion County Criminal Justice Coordinating Council
- United Way Strategic Planning Committee
- Clarian Health's Community Plunge Steering Committee
- Employers Against Domestic Violence Initiative

== Ice Miller (1999–2001) ==
After she was deputy mayor, she joined the Indianapolis-based law firm of Ice Miller in the Government Services Practice Group. In 1999, she was named Influential Woman of Indianapolis. That year, she also earned a spot on Indianapolis Business Journal's 40 under 40 list in 1999.

== U.S. Attorney (2001–2007) ==
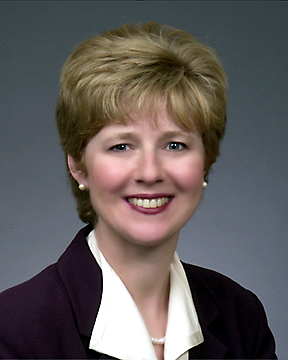
Brooks during her tenure as U.S. Attorney

In 2001, President George W. Bush appointed her as U.S. Attorney for the Southern District of Indiana. She earned an advisory-leadership role with two U.S. Attorneys General. She focused on mortgage fraud, gun violence, drug trafficking, gangs, child exploitation, and identity theft.

In her first few weeks in office, she charged Dr. Randolph Lievertz of Indianapolis with illegally prescribing OxyContin. She said he was by far the biggest prescriber of that drug under Indiana's Medicaid program. In 2000, he prescribed six times more than the amount of Indiana's second highest prescriber of Oxy.

She earned the Who's Who in Law in 2002, Super Lawyer from 2004 to 2008, and Indiana Lawyer Leadership in 2006.

== Ivy Tech Community College (2007–2011) ==
In October 2007, she decided to resign her position as U.S. Attorney to become general counsel and senior vice president for workforce and economic development at the Ivy Tech Community College. According to their website, "She is responsible for the leadership, direction and development of Ivy Tech's statewide strategies and programming in workforce development. She is an integral part of the state's strategic initiative to develop a trained workforce to attract and retain businesses in an effort to bolster the economic viability of the state."

In 2007, she earned the Sagamore of the Wabash. In 2008, she earned the Touchstone Award and for the second time earned Influential Woman of Indianapolis. In 2011, she also earned for the second time the Who's Who in Law.

== U.S. House of Representatives ==
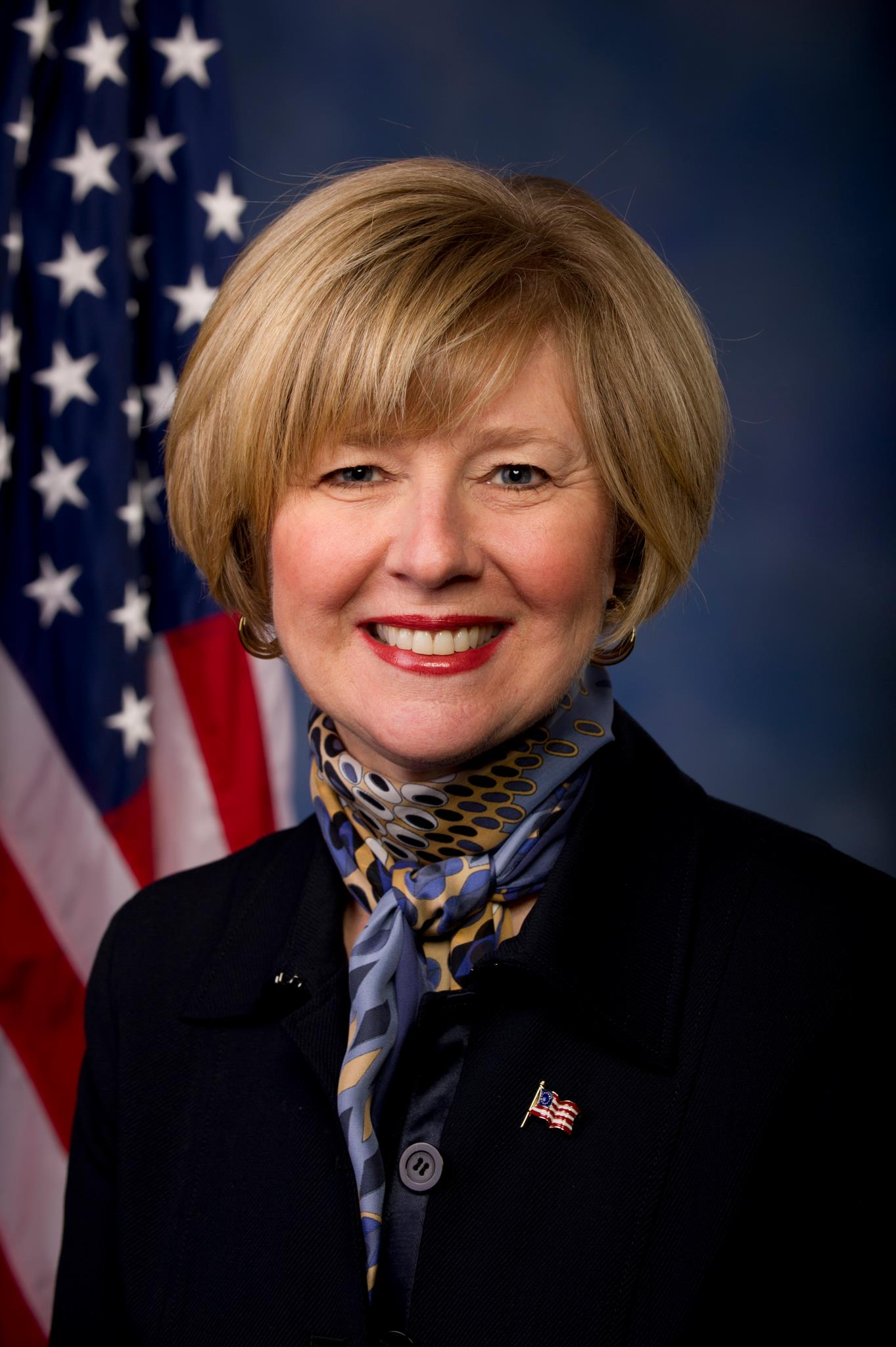
Brooks' during her freshman year, 113th Congress

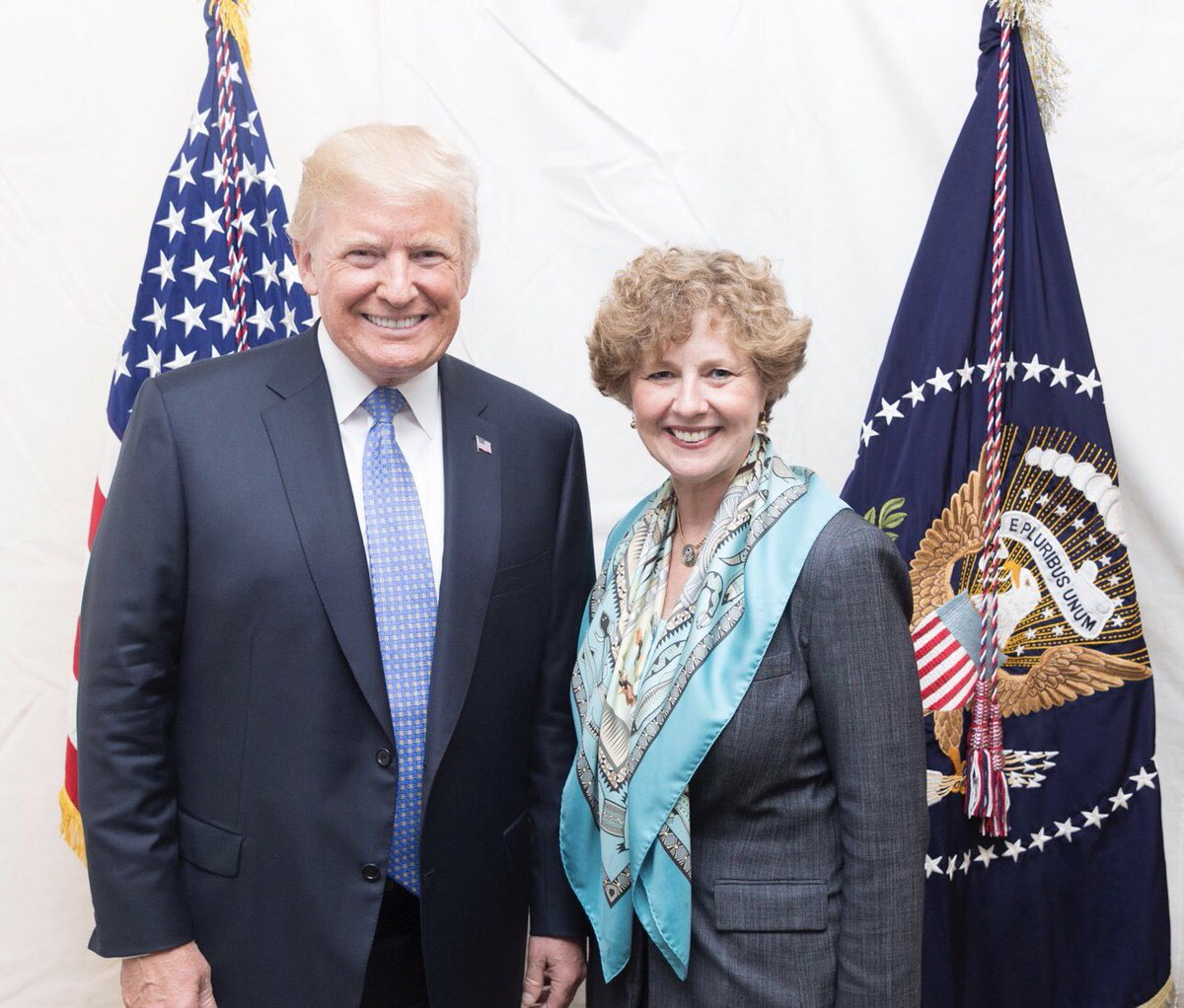
Brooks with President Donald Trump

=== Elections ===
2012

When she was U.S. Attorney, her Southern District covered two-thirds of Indiana, including the majority of the newly redrawn 5th District, after 2011 redistricting. Fifteen-term Republican U.S. Congressman Dan Burton decided to retire. Brooks entered a crowded seven-way primary—the real contest in this strongly Republican district. She had actually entered the race before Burton's retirement. New Jersey Governor and former U.S. Attorney Chris Christie endorsed and fundraised for Brooks.

In May 2012, she won the Republican primary with 30% of the vote, just one point ahead of the second-place finisher and former U.S. Congressman David McIntosh. With Brooks' election in November 2012, she became the second Republican woman elected to Congress from Indiana alongside Jackie Walorski (the last having been Cecil Harden, who served from 1949 to 1959) and sixth overall (Democrats having previously elected four: Virginia Jenckes from 1933 to 1939; Katie Hall from 1982 to 1985; Jill L. Long from 1989 to 1995 and Julia Carson from 1997 until her death in 2007).

Brooks won the 2012 election, defeating Democrat Scott Reske with 58% of the vote.

2014

Brooks's vote to end the October 2013 government shutdown led members of the Tea Party to support David Stockdale's campaign for her seat. In the primary election on May 6, Brooks defeated Stockdale and his fellow challenger, David Campbell, winning 73% of the vote. On November 4, Brooks won the general election with 65% of the vote, defeating Democrat Shawn Denney and Libertarian John Krom.

2018

Brooks was held to 56 percent of the vote to Democrat Dee Thornton's 43 percent of the vote. It was the first time a Democrat had managed even 40 percent of the vote in the district since it assumed its present configuration as a north suburban district in 1983 (it was numbered as the 6th from 1983 to 2003, and has been the 5th since 2003).

2020

Brooks announced on June 14, 2019, that she would be retiring from Congress at the end of the session and would not seek re-election. She retained her role as recruitment chairman for the Republican National Congressional Committee for the 2020 election.

=== Committee assignments ===
- Energy and Commerce Committee
  - Subcommittee on Health
  - Subcommittee on Oversight and Investigations
  - Subcommittee on Commerce, Manufacturing & Trade
- Committee on Ethics
- House Select Committee on the Events Surrounding the 2012 Terrorist Attack in Benghazi
- Republican Study Committee
- Bipartisan Congressional Caucus for Women's Issues

=== Caucus memberships ===
- Congressional NextGen 9-1-1 Caucus

=== Legislation ===
On December 19, 2017, Brooks voted in favor of the Tax Cuts and Jobs Act of 2017.

On May 4, 2017, Brooks voted for the American Health Care Act, reversing her position of February 2017, when she claimed to oppose taking insurance from people with preexisting conditions.

On July 29, 2015, Brooks introduced the Strengthening Public Health Emergency Response Act of 2015, H.R. 3299, bipartisan legislation that will dramatically transform and enhance the nation's ability to respond to current and emerging biothreats. This legislation reforms our nation's medical countermeasure acquisition process, incentivizes research to combat the next generation of deadly diseases, and increases accountability of preparedness spending. It is one of the legislative proposals highlighted by the bipartisan Blue Ribbon Panel Study on Biodefense as an important step towards shoring up our national security and preparedness for biothreats.

On June 17, 2015, Brooks introduced the Heroin and Prescription Opioid Abuse Prevention, Education, and Enforcement Act of 2015, H.R. 2805, which targets several areas of need critical to reducing the number of painkiller and heroin overdose deaths each year. The legislation will establish a working group to develop new guidance and best practices for members of the medical community, reauthorize prescription drug monitoring programs (PDMP) critical to local law enforcement efforts, increase access to life-saving Naloxone and raise public, provider, and patient awareness of opioid drugs. It is the companion bill to S. 1134, legislation introduced by Senators Joe Donnelly (D-IN) and Kelly Ayotte (R-NH) in April 2015.

On March 14, 2014, Brooks introduced the Social Media Working Group Act of 2014 (H.R. 4263, 113th Congress); H.R. 623, 114th Congress), a bill that would direct the United States Secretary of Homeland Security to establish within the United States Department of Homeland Security (DHS) a social media working group to provide guidance and best practices to the emergency preparedness and response community on the use of social media technologies before, during, and after a terrorist attack. This legislation was reintroduced in 2015, and became law in November 2015.

On March 18, 2014, Rep. Brooks introduced the Cooperative and Small Employer Charity Pension Flexibility Act (H.R. 4275; 113th Congress). The bill would allow some charities, schools, and volunteer organizations to remain exempt from pension plan rules under the Employee Retirement Income Security Act of 1974 (ERISA) and the Internal Revenue Code. Brooks argued that the bill was needed because "some charities, schools and cooperatives are actually shutting down summer camps, cutting back on services to the community, or raising prices just to meet their pension obligations." The bill passed the House on March 24, 2014.

On July 29, 2015, Brooks introduced, along with Rep. Anna Eshoo, the Strengthening Public Health Emergency Response Act of 2015, H.R. 3299. The bill would streamline government decisions and provide incentives for vaccines and treatment of dangerous pathogens and diseases. Brooks sponsored the bill in response to a report released in October 2015 by the Blue Ribbon Study Panel on Biodefense.

Brooks was ranked as the 44th most bipartisan member of the U.S. House of Representatives during the first session of the 115th United States Congress by the Bipartisan Index, created by The Lugar Center and the McCourt School of Public Policy to assess congressional bipartisanship.

She is a member of the Republican Main Street Partnership.

In February 2018, Brooks along with U.S. Rep. Anna Eshoo (D-CA) founded a new bipartisan caucus called the Congressional Biodefense Caucus. The group will work to focus in "improving the preparedness of the United States to respond to a pandemic or chemical, biological, radiological, and nuclear (CBRN) threats." Brooks and Eshoo launched the caucus during a reception in Washington with more than 50 attendees from Congress and the biodefense industry.

== Political positions ==
Susan Brooks was a member of the Republican Main Street Partnership which presented what it described as centrist Republican policies and also described as a moderately conservative Congressional caucus. The non-partisan National Journal gave her a composite ideological rating of 78% conservative and 22% liberal. She has a lifetime 72% conservative score from the American Conservative Union.

=== Fiscal ===
On fiscal issues, Brooks has an 85% lifetime rating from the fiscally conservative Americans for Prosperity. In 2015, she was the only Indiana Republican in the House to vote for a bipartisan continuing resolution to fund the federal government.

=== Social issues ===
Brooks is supportive of LGBT rights. In May 2019, she voted for the Equality Act, which prohibited discrimination on the basis of sexual orientation or gender identity. Brooks joined seven other Republicans and 228 Democrats in supporting the legislation, which passed the U.S. House of Representatives during the 116th United States Congress.

=== Sexual harassment ===
Brooks is "opposed to any sexual harassment, whether in the workplace or out of the workplace." In a 2017 interview, she said that she had not personally experienced sexual harassment. She described the harassment allegations against Donald Trump as "personally disgusting." She describes the federal process for investigating sexual harassment in federal workplaces as "not...as effective as it should be." She supports creating an ombudsman or advocate's office to handle reports, which would also provide a counselor to each victim.

=== Biodefense ===
Brooks believes the U.S. is underprepared to fight bioterrorism and respond to other biological threats. She has introduced legislation that increases funding for federal biodefense activities. According to Brooks: ISIS and other terrorist groups are trying to get chemical and biological weapons; the U.S. is vulnerable to epidemics and pandemics; and the U.S. is more reactive than proactive when it comes to biological threats. The Blue Ribbon Study Panel on Biodefense released a report in 2015 that concluded that the country's biodefense efforts needed to be improved. It gave 39 specific actionable recommendations. To help implement some of these recommendations, Brooks introduced H.R. 3299 - the Strengthening Public Health Emergency Response Act, along with Congresswoman Anna Eshoo. The bill incentivizes the development of vaccines for pathogens identified as dangerous by the U.S. Department of Homeland Security. The bill was signed into law as part of the 21st Century Cures Act.

In March 2018, Brooks and Anna Eschoo launched the Congressional Biodefense Caucus. Within a week, the caucus had 21 Members of Congress as members. The caucus is “dedicated to strengthening our nation's biodefense enterprise and national security.” The caucus will focus on chemical, biological, radiological, and nuclear (CBRN) threats and pandemic outbreaks.

=== Donald Trump ===
In July 2019, Brooks was one of four Republican House members to vote in support of a motion to condemn remarks by President Trump made on Twitter calling on "'Progressive' Democrat Congresswomen who originally came from countries" that are described as failing to "go back and help fix the totally broken and crime infested places from which they came." Brooks voted against both articles of impeachment in the First Impeachment of Donald Trump.

== Personal life ==
As of 2012 Brooks resided in Carmel, Indiana with her husband, David, and their two children. She is Catholic. She is also a sustaining member of the Junior League of Indianapolis.

== See also ==
- Women in the United States House of Representatives

Legal offices
Preceded by Judith Ann Stewart	United States Attorney for the Southern District of Indiana; 2001–2007	Succeeded by Timothy Morrison
U.S. House of Representatives
Preceded by Dan Burton	Member of the U.S. House of Representatives from Indiana's 5th congressional district 2013–2021	Succeeded by Victoria Spartz
Preceded by Charlie Dent	Chair of the House Ethics Committee; 2017–2019	Succeeded by Ted Deutch
Preceded by Kristi Noem	Chair of the Congressional Women's Caucus; 2017–2019	Succeeded by Brenda Lawrence
Party political offices
Preceded by John Katko; Elise Stefanik	Chair of the Republican Governance Group; Tuesday Group: 2019–2020; 2019–2021; Served alongside: John Katko, Fred Upton	Succeeded by John Katko
U.S. order of precedence (ceremonial)
Preceded by Todd Rokita as Former U.S. Representative	Order of precedence of the United States as Former U.S. Representative	Succeeded by Wayne Dowdy as Former U.S. Representative
