= COVID-19 vaccination in Singapore =

Plan to immunize against COVID-19

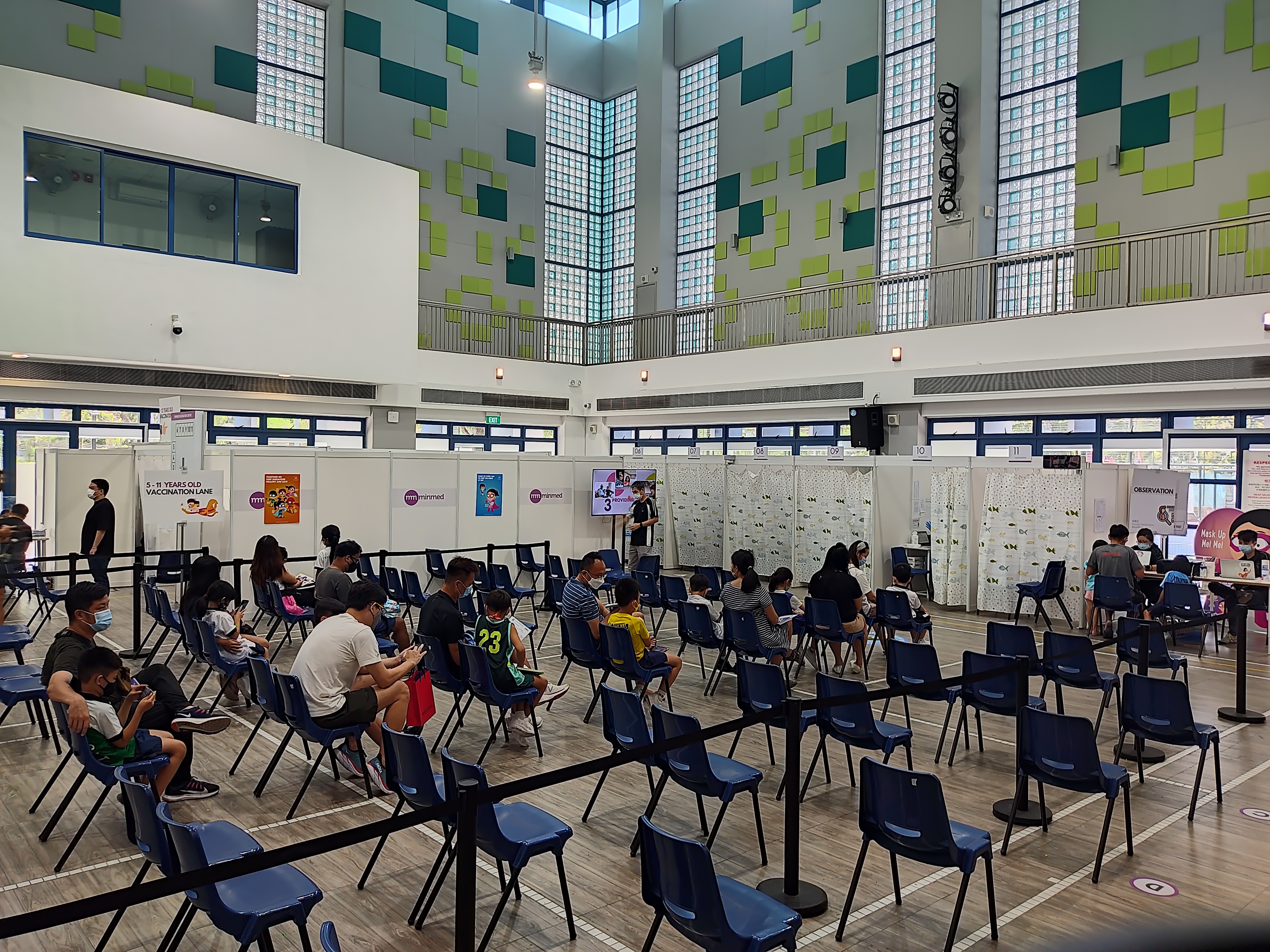
- A COVID-19 Vaccination Centre in Singapore
- Date: 30 December 2020 – present
- Location: Singapore
- Cause: COVID-19 pandemic in Singapore
- Participants: 10,818,023 total doses administered (as of 27 October 2021) (Note: 10,049,015 under the national vaccination programme, 4,734,669 of which have received at least the first dose, 4,675,888 have been fully vaccinated, and 760,408 have received their booster shots; 45,484 (25,079 individuals) under the WHO's emergency use list.) (Note: From 29 October 2021, MOH will no longer report number of doses.)

The COVID-19 vaccination in Singapore is an ongoing immunisation campaign against severe acute respiratory syndrome coronavirus 2 (SARS-CoV-2), the virus that causes coronavirus disease 2019 (COVID-19), in response to the ongoing pandemic in the country. Singapore has a very high vaccination rate, with more than 92% of its total population (and more than 93% of its eligible population) having completed their vaccination regimen.

== Background ==
1. Unvaccinated population (7.00%)
2. Population who are fully vaccinated (92.0%)
3. Population who have received only one dose of a two-dose vaccine (1.00%)

The Singapore Government invested more than one billion Singapore dollars to sign advanced purchase agreements and made early down payments on promising vaccine candidates, such as Pfizer BioNTech, Moderna and CoronaVac.

=== Expert Committee on COVID-19 Vaccination ===
On 5 October 2020, the Singapore Government appointed a 14-member Expert Committee on COVID-19 Vaccination, which was to advise and assess on the efficacy and safety of COVID-19 vaccines for use in Singapore. On 24 December 2020, the Expert Committee submitted its recommendations on the overall vaccination strategy of Singapore to the government. In its recommendations, they highlighted that two groups of people had to be prioritised for vaccination: people who are at high risk of infection, the frontline healthcare workers; and people who are vulnerable of severe diseases and complications from infections, the elderly. The Committee continued to advise on the use of vaccines as the pandemic continues. It recommended booster shots for people above 60 of age as evidence of declining efficacy of vaccination over time emerged, and updated recommendations for those with mild skin reactions after first dosage to continue their vaccination programme.

=== 2020 ===
On 14 December 2020, Singapore became the first Asian country to approve Pfizer-BioNTech's coronavirus vaccine. The first shipment of the vaccine arrived seven days later on 21 December.

Singapore also received its first shipment of Sinovac Biotech's CoronaVac vaccine, on 22 December 2020. However, the vaccine was not authorised for use by the Health Sciences Authority (HSA). On 2 June 2021, MOH approved the Sinovac vaccine for used in private healthcare settings so people, who are not suitable to take the mRNA vaccines, can take the Sinovac vaccine. However, since the China-made vaccine is not part of the national programme, those who choose to receive it will not be eligible for the Vaccine Injury Financial Assistance Programme (VIFAP) should they develop any adverse reactions.

On 30 December 2020, Singapore became the first country in Asia to start its COVID-19 vaccination campaign. The vaccine is free for all Singaporeans and long-term residents. Health workers, other frontline workers and seniors were the first inoculated with the vaccine jointly developed by BioNTech and Pfizer.

=== 2021 ===
On 3 February 2021, Singapore also became the first country in Asia to approve Moderna's COVID-19 vaccine, jointly developed by the National Institute of Allergy and Infectious Diseases (NIAID), the Biomedical Advanced Research and Development Authority (BARDA), and Moderna.

On 18 May, the Health Ministry announced that those who register for COVID-19 vaccination from 19 May onwards will have their second dose scheduled six to eight weeks after the first, instead of three to four weeks later. This change in strategy was aimed to have 400,000 more people in Singapore to be given at least one vaccine dose by end-July so that virtually all eligible Singapore residents will get at least one dose by early August. However, as vaccine supplies continue to arrive as planned and most of the population who are willing to take the vaccine will have received their first dose by the second half of July, MOH announced on 29 June that the interval between the first and second doses of the COVID-19 vaccine would revert to four weeks. This was part of the efforts to ensure that more of the population will be fully vaccinated earlier. On 9 July, it was announced that the interval between doses of the Pfizer-BioNTech vaccine would be further shortened to 3 weeks. It was further added that those who had previously taken a vaccine not approved under the National Vaccination Programme would be advised to take 2 doses of the approved ones.

The Health Sciences Authority (HSA) also approved the use of the Pfizer-BioNTech coronavirus vaccine for children aged 12 to 15; previously, it was given only to those aged 16 years and above. It was granted interim authorization by the HSA under the Pandemic Special Access Route in December 2020.

On 24 June, the Health Ministry concluded a purchase agreement with Novavax for its non-mRNA COVID-19 vaccine, with shipments expected to arrive in Singapore before the end of 2021.

On 28 July, IHH Healthcare Singapore obtained approval to import the Sinopharm BIBP vaccine (BBIBP-CorV) via the special access route (SAR). The SAR was set up on 31 May to allow individuals to choose vaccines not under the national inoculation program.

On 2 August, Senior Minister of State for Health Janil Puthucheary announced in Parliament that those who had allergic reactions after receiving the first dose of an mRNA COVID-19 vaccine will be invited to receive the Sinovac CoronaVac vaccine and will be deemed as fully vaccinated individuals.

On 6 August, the Health Ministry announced it shall recognize all COVID-19 vaccines listed under the Emergency Use Listing (EUL) by the World Health Organization (WHO) starting from 10 August 2021. This means that Singapore recognizes all individuals that have been inoculated with a WHO-approved vaccine as fully vaccinated individuals and shall be accorded vaccination-differentiated safe management measures and travel concessions.

On 20 September, an additional 101,000 doses of the Sinovac vaccine was delivered.

On 23 October, the Health Sciences Authority (HSA) granted interim authorization under the Pandemic Special Access Route for the CoronaVac vaccine under a three-dose regime, following which it was included in the National Vaccination Programme. Those who are ineligible to take either of the approved mRNA vaccines would be invited for this vaccine and eligible for the Vaccine Injury Financial Assistance Programme (VIFAP).

On 10 December, the Health Sciences Authority approved the use of the Pfizer-BioNTech coronavirus vaccine for children aged 5 to 11 with the first shots to be given by end-2021. At the same time, Pfizer-BioNTech coronavirus vaccine is approved for full registration. The first shipment of the paediatric vaccine arrived seven days later on 22 December with the first shots given on 27 December.

==== Booster shots ====
Singapore started the rolling out of booster shots for senior citizens above 60 years of age from 14 September 2021. Subsequently, from 4 October, it will start giving booster shots for the eligible population above 50 years of age, followed by individuals above 30 years of age from 9 October. The eligible population should have their second dose taken before 6 months. From 24 November, eligible population who completed their second dose before 5 months can get booster shots for all age groups. On 10 December, the use of booster shots is extended to individuals above 18 years of age starting from 14 December. From 14 March 2022, children aged 12 to 17 will need to get a booster shot within 270 days of receiving their second dose of the COVID-19 vaccine. Those who do not take the booster shot after 9 months from the second dose will have their vaccination status removed.

=== 2022 ===
On 14 February 2022, the Health Sciences Authority (HSA) announced that it had granted interim authorization for the Novavax vaccine under the brand name Nuvaxovid, under the Pandemic Special Access Route; it is a two-dose regimen, and shall be included in the National Vaccination Programme for adults aged 18 years old and above. Presently, it is a protein-based subunit vaccine authorized in Singapore.

From May 2022, vaccination centres will be consolidated as Singapore transits to COVID-19 resilience.

=== 2024 ===
On 28 October 2024, the Ministry of Health (MOH) will begin the rollout of updated JN.1 COVID-19 vaccines—Pfizer-BioNTech/Comirnaty and Moderna/Spikevax—based on the 2024/2025 recommendations of the Expert Committee for Immunisation (ECI). The updated vaccination is particularly recommended for individuals at higher risk of severe illness, including seniors and those with medical vulnerabilities. To enhance accessibility, nearly 500 Healthier SG General Practitioner (GP) clinics and 10 polyclinics will provide vaccinations within the community. In light of this expanded community access, the remaining five Joint Testing and Vaccination Centres (JTVCs) will cease operations from 1 December 2024.

== Recognition of vaccine certificates ==
On 19 August 2021, the Immigration and Checkpoints Authority (ICA) shall issue a tamper-proof vaccination sticker that is to be pasted onto their travel documents and can serve as proof of vaccination. The issuance of this special sticker will be limited to travelers who have been vaccinated with a COVID-19 vaccine under the Emergency Use Listing (EUL) by the World Health Organization (WHO) and the presentation of a valid English-language vaccination certificate.

On 24 September 2021, Malaysian National Recovery Council chairman Muhyiddin Yassin confirmed that Malaysia and Singapore would recognise each other's vaccination certificates in order to facilitate travel between the two countries.

== Vaccines used ==
1. Moderna (962,127) (22.6%)
2. Pfizer-BioNTech (3,085,524) (72.6%)
3. Sinovac (301,000) (4.71%)

=== National vaccination programme ===
Vaccine	Progress	Doses ordered	Approval	Deployment	Manufacturer	Ref.
Pfizer–BioNTech/Comirnaty	Approved for use	unknown	14 December 2020 (EUA)	30 December 2020	(United States) (Germany) Pfizer and BioNTech	-
Moderna	Approved for use	unknown	3 February 2021 (EUA)	17 March 2021	(United States) Moderna	-
CoronaVac	Approved for use	301,000	23 October 2021 (EUA)	4 June 2021	(China) Sinovac	(Note: The CoronaVac vaccine was previously issued emergency authorization under the Special Access Route on 2 June 2021 upon being listed under the Emergency Use Listing (EUL) by the World Health Organization (WHO).)
Nuvaxovid	Approved for use	unknown	14 February 2022 (EUA)	18 May 2022	(United States) Novavax	(Note: The Novavax COVID-19 vaccine under the brand names: Nuvaxovid and Covovax, the licensed vaccine of the vaccine manufactured by the Serum Institute of India was previously issued emergency authorization under the Special Access Route on 17 December 2021 upon being listed under the Emergency Use Listing (EUL) by the World Health Organization (WHO).)

=== Special access route ===
Vaccine	Progress	Doses ordered	Approval	Deployment	Manufacturer	Ref.
Sinopharm BIBP	Partially approved	unknown	28 July 2021 (EUA)	30 August 2021	(China) Sinopharm	-
Johnson&Johnson/Janssen	Partially approved	unknown	10 August 2021 (EUA)	Pending	(United States) (Belgium) (Netherlands) Janssen	-
Oxford–AstraZeneca/AZD1222/Covishield	Partially approved	unknown	10 August 2021 (EUA)	Pending	(United Kingdom) (Sweden) University of Oxford and AstraZeneca	(Note: This authorization includes Covishield, the licensed vaccine of the vaccine manufactured by the Serum Institute of India.)
Covaxin	Partially approved	unknown	3 November 2021 (EUA)	Pending	(India) Bharat Biotech	-
Convidecia	Partially approved	unknown	19 May 2022 (EUA)	Pending	(China) CanSino Biologics	-
