= Matrix-M =

Vaccine adjuvant

Matrix-M is a vaccine adjuvant, a substance that is added to various vaccines to stimulate the immune response. It was patented in 2020 by Novavax and is composed of nanoparticles from saponins extracted from Quillaja saponaria (soapbark) trees, cholesterol, and phospholipids. It is an immune stimulating complex (ISCOM), which are nanospheres formed when saponin is mixed with two types of fats.

== Composition ==
Matrix-M contains a complex mix of saponins extracted from the bark of soapbark trees (Quillaia) packaged into nanoparticles made of cholesterol and phospholipids. 15% of the nanoparticles are known as Matrix-C and contain saponins derived from "Fraction C" of the tree bark extract (mainly QS-21). Matrix-C has strong adjuvant activity but is also highly reactogenic (lethargy and lethality in mice). The remaining 85% are known as Matrix-A and contain "Fraction A" saponins. Matrix-A is a weaker adjuvant but is also very well tolerated. Combined, they form a strong adjuvant with acceptable reactogenecity.

Packaging saponins into nanoparticles achieves three things:

- Protection of the saponin molecule from hydrolysis
- Protection of tissue from direct saponin irritation (raw QS-21 causes immediate pain at injection site and also hemolysis in vitro)
- Targeted delivery of saponins to phagocytes

Forerunners to the Matrix-M technology include ISCOM (Morein et al., 1984) and ISCOMATRIX (CSL Limited, 2012).

== Use ==
Adjuvants increase the body's immune response to a vaccine by creating higher levels of antibodies. They can either enhance, modulate, and/or prolong the body's immune response, reducing the number of vaccinations needed for immunization.

The Matrix-M adjuvant is used in a number of vaccine candidates, including the malaria vaccine R21/Matrix-M, influenza vaccines, and in the approved Novavax COVID-19 vaccine. In 2021, the R21/Matrix-M malaria vaccine candidate showed a 72% in sites with seasonal implementation and 67% in sites with age-based implementation in the modified per-protocol analysis. /> In influenza vaccine candidates, Matrix-M was shown to offer cross-protection against multiple strains of influenza.

Novavax is also testing a combined flu and COVID-19 vaccine candidate with Matrix-M.
