= Novavax =

American biotechnology company

Coordinates: 39.1371°N 77.2267°W

Novavax, Inc.
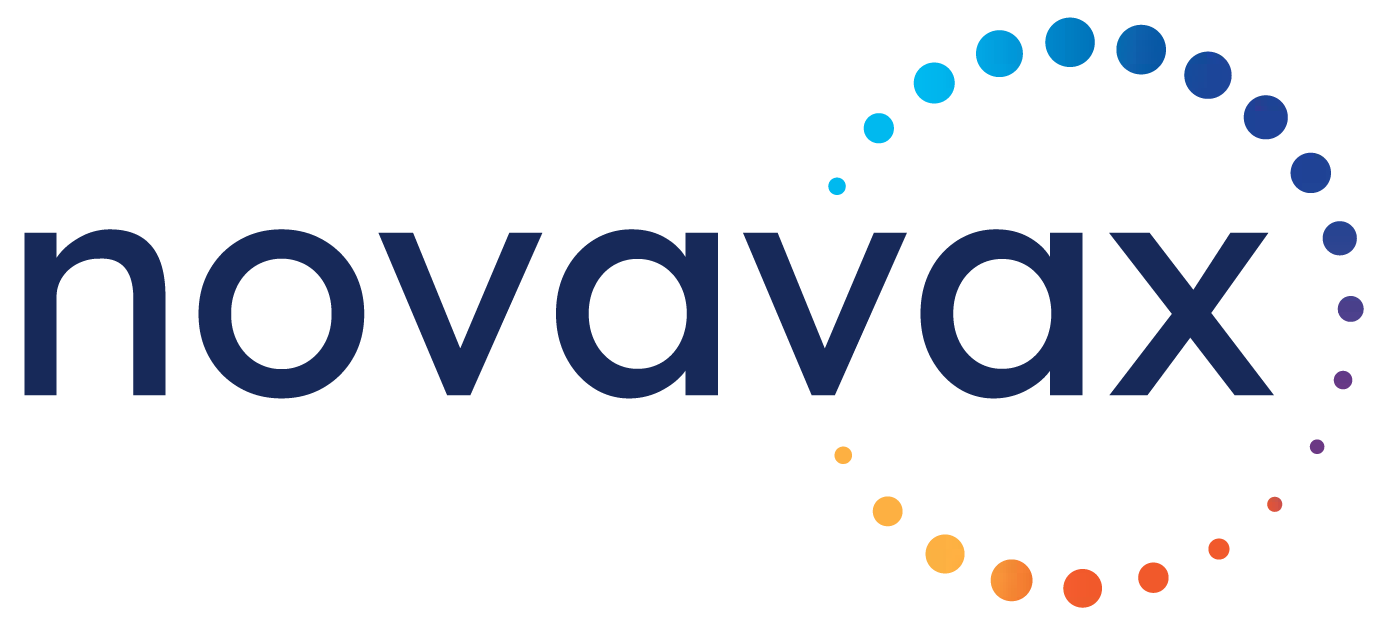
- Type: Public
- Traded as: Nasdaq: NVAX
- ISIN: US6700024010
- Industry: Biotechnology
- Founded: 1987; 39 years ago
- Headquarters: Gaithersburg, United States
- Area served: Worldwide
- Key people: John C. Jacobs (CEO); James P. Kelly (CFO)
- Products: Vaccines
- Revenue: ▼US$682 million (2024)
- Operating income: ▲ -US$248 million (2024)
- Net income: ▲ -US$187 million (2024)
- Total assets: ▼US$1.560 billion (2024)
- Total equity: ▲ -US$623 million (2024)
- Number of employees: 952 (2025)
- Website: www.novavax.com

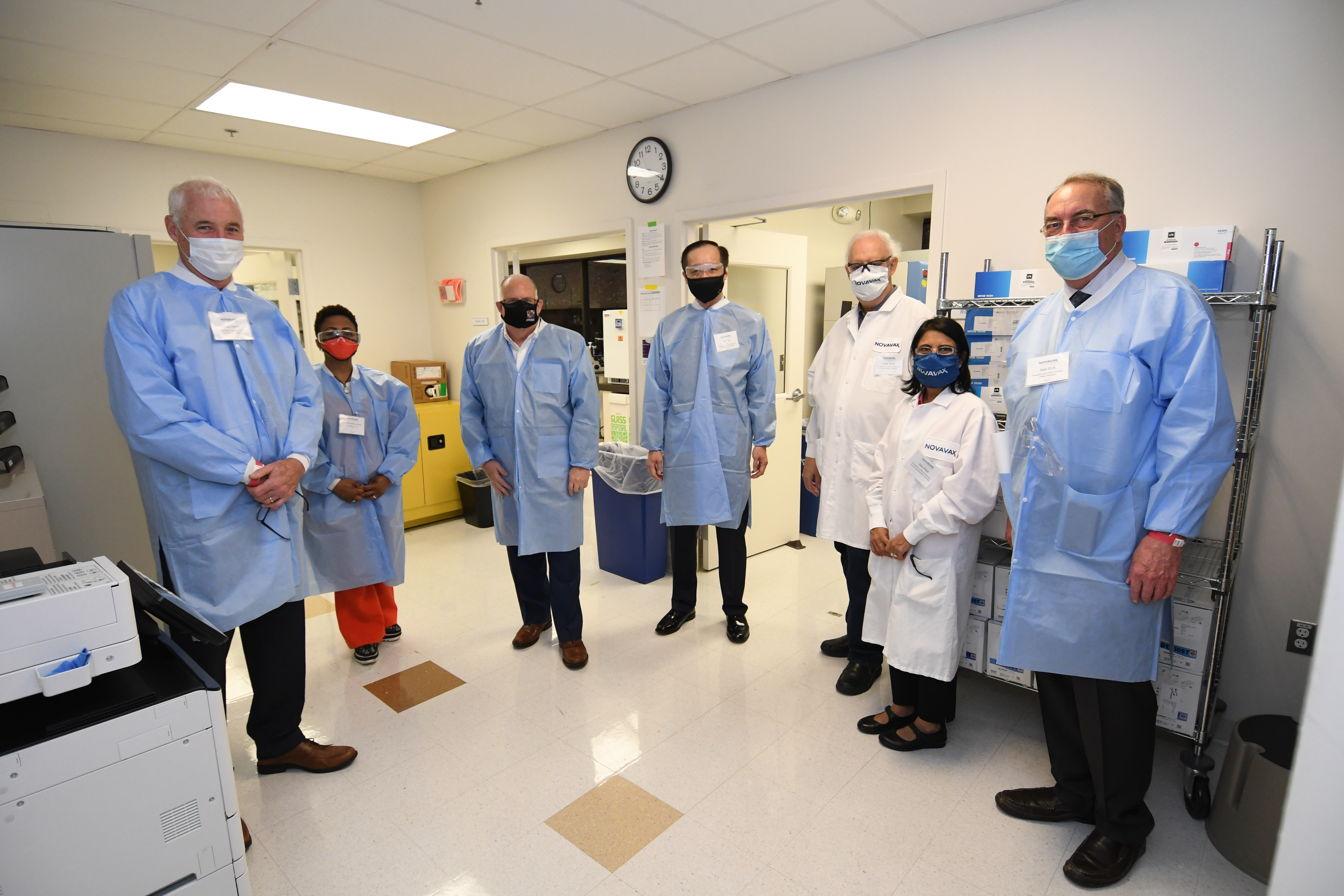
Stanley Erck (right) and Gregory Glenn (left) at the biotech labs in Gaithersburg during the visit of the Governor of Maryland

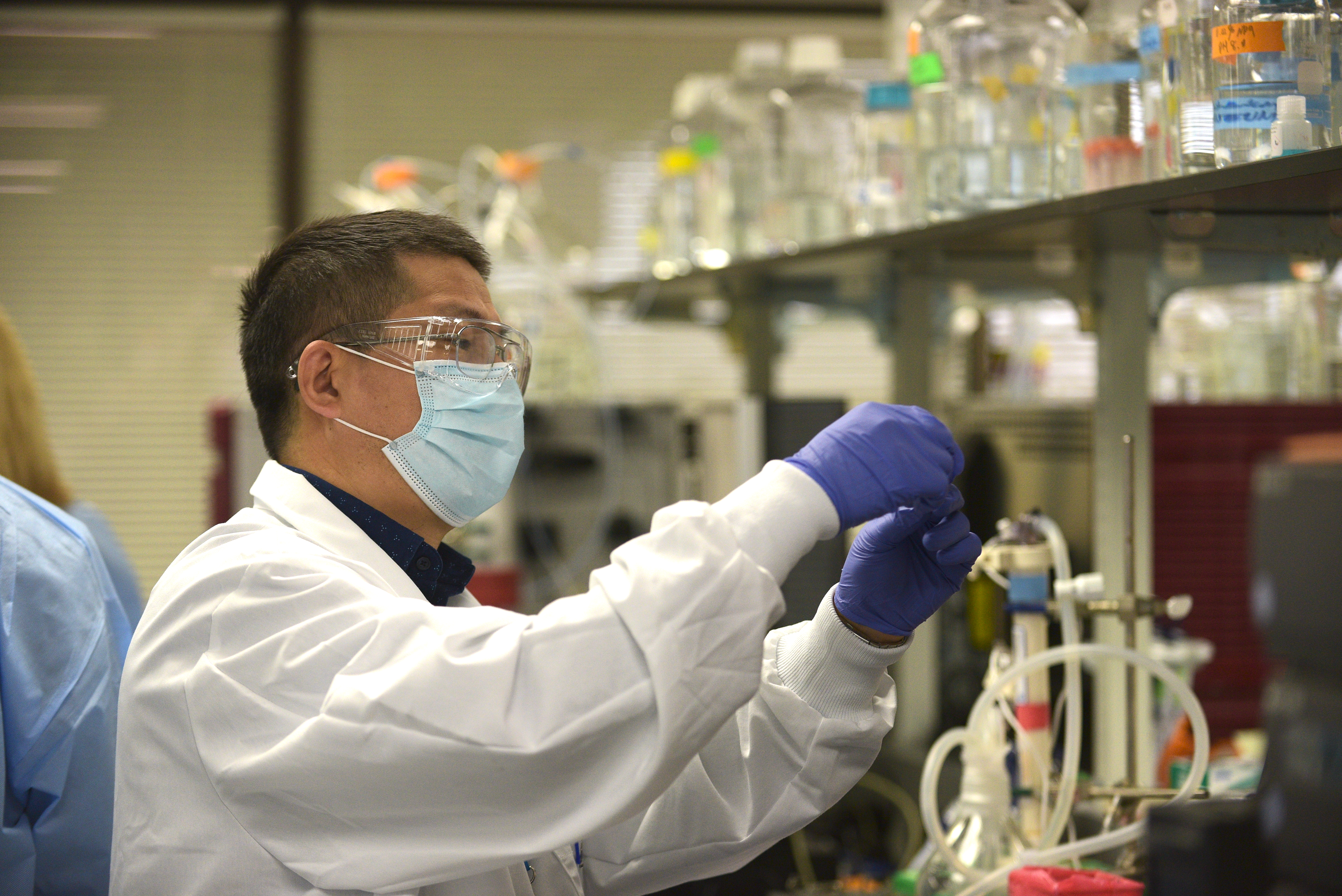
Novavax research and development laboratories in Gaithersburg

Novavax, Inc., based in Gaithersburg, Maryland, develops vaccines to counter infectious diseases. The company developed the Novavax COVID-19 vaccine, now commercialized by Sanofi. The company also develops vaccines for influenza, respiratory syncytial virus (RSV), avian flu, shingles, Clostridioides difficile, and malaria.

Novavax develops proprietary immune-stimulating saponin-based immunologic adjuvants at a wholly owned Swedish subsidiary, Novavax AB. One of these, Matrix-M, is used in the Novavax COVID-19 vaccine.

== History ==
The company was founded in 1987.

In June 2013, Novavax acquired Swedish company Isconova AB, renamed Novavax AB, and its Matrix-M adjuvant platform for $30 million.

=== ResVax ===
In March 2015, the company completed a Phase I trial for its Ebola vaccine candidate, as well as a phase II study in adults for its respiratory syncytial virus vaccine, which would become ResVax. The ResVax trial was encouraging as it showed significant efficacy against respiratory syncytial virus (RSV) infection, using a nanoparticle-based treatment using a recombinant F lipoprotein or saponin, "extracted from the Quillaja saponaria [or?] Molina bark together with cholesterol and phospholipid." It is aimed at stimulating resistance to RSV infection, targeting both adult and infant populations.

In 2016, the company completed its first phase III trial, the 12,000 adult Resolve trial, for its RSV vaccine, later known as ResVax; it did not reach its goals. This triggered an eighty-five percent dive in the company's stock price. Phase II adult trial results also released in 2016 showed a stimulation of antigenicity, but failure in efficacy. Evaluation of these results suggested that an alternative dosing strategy might lead to success, leading to plans to run new phase II trials. The company's difficulties in 2016 led to a three-part strategy for 2017: cost reduction through restructuring and the termination of 30% of their workforce; pouring more effort into getting ResVax to market; and beginning clinical trials on a Zika virus vaccine.

Alongside the adult studies of ResVax, the vaccine was also in 2016 being tested against infant RSV infection through the route of maternal immunization.

In 2019, late-stage clinical testing of ResVax failed for a second time, which resulted in a major downturn in investor confidence and a seventy percent reduction in capital value for the firm. As a secondary result, the company was forced to conduct a reverse stock split in order to maintain Nasdaq minimum qualification, meaning it was in risk of being delisted.

=== NanoFlu ===
NanoFlu is a quadrivalent influenza vaccine, which completed Phase II clinical trials successfully in 2019. In January 2020, it was granted fast track designation by the U.S. Food and Drug Administration (FDA) to move into Phase III trials, which completed in March 2020.

== Finance and external sponsorships ==
Novavax is funded by a mix of private and public investment.

In 2015, Novavax received a US$89 million research grant from the Bill and Melinda Gates Foundation to support the development of a vaccine against RSV for infants via maternal immunization.

In May 2020, Novavax received US$384 million from the Coalition for Epidemic Preparedness Innovations to fund early-stage evaluation in healthy adults of the company's COVID-19 vaccine candidate and to develop resources in preparation for large-scale manufacturing, if the vaccine proves successful. CEPI had already invested $4 million in March.

On 7 July 2020, during the Donald Trump administration, the company was awarded a US$1.6 billion loan from the United States government from Operation Warp Speed program to cover the testing, commercialization and production of a potential coronavirus vaccine in the United States, with a goal of delivering 100 million doses by January 2021.

Novavax announced a $1.2 billion partnership with Sanofi in October 2024, allowing Sanofi to use Novavax’s Matrix-M adjuvant for other products. The partnership allows Novavax to develop its own Covid/influenza combination vaccine, with the rest of their pipeline shifting to preclinical.

Novavax scaled back operations by about $1 billion from 2022 - 2024, with less focus on research and development.

In December 2024, Novavax sold its Czech manufacturing facility to Novo Nordisk for $200 million.

== COVID-19 vaccine ==
=== Vaccine research and development ===
In January 2020, Novavax announced development of a vaccine candidate, named NVX-CoV2373, to establish immunity to SARS-CoV-2. NVX-CoV2373 is a protein subunit vaccine that contains the spike protein of the SARS-CoV-2 virus. Novavax's work is in competition for vaccine development among dozens of other companies.

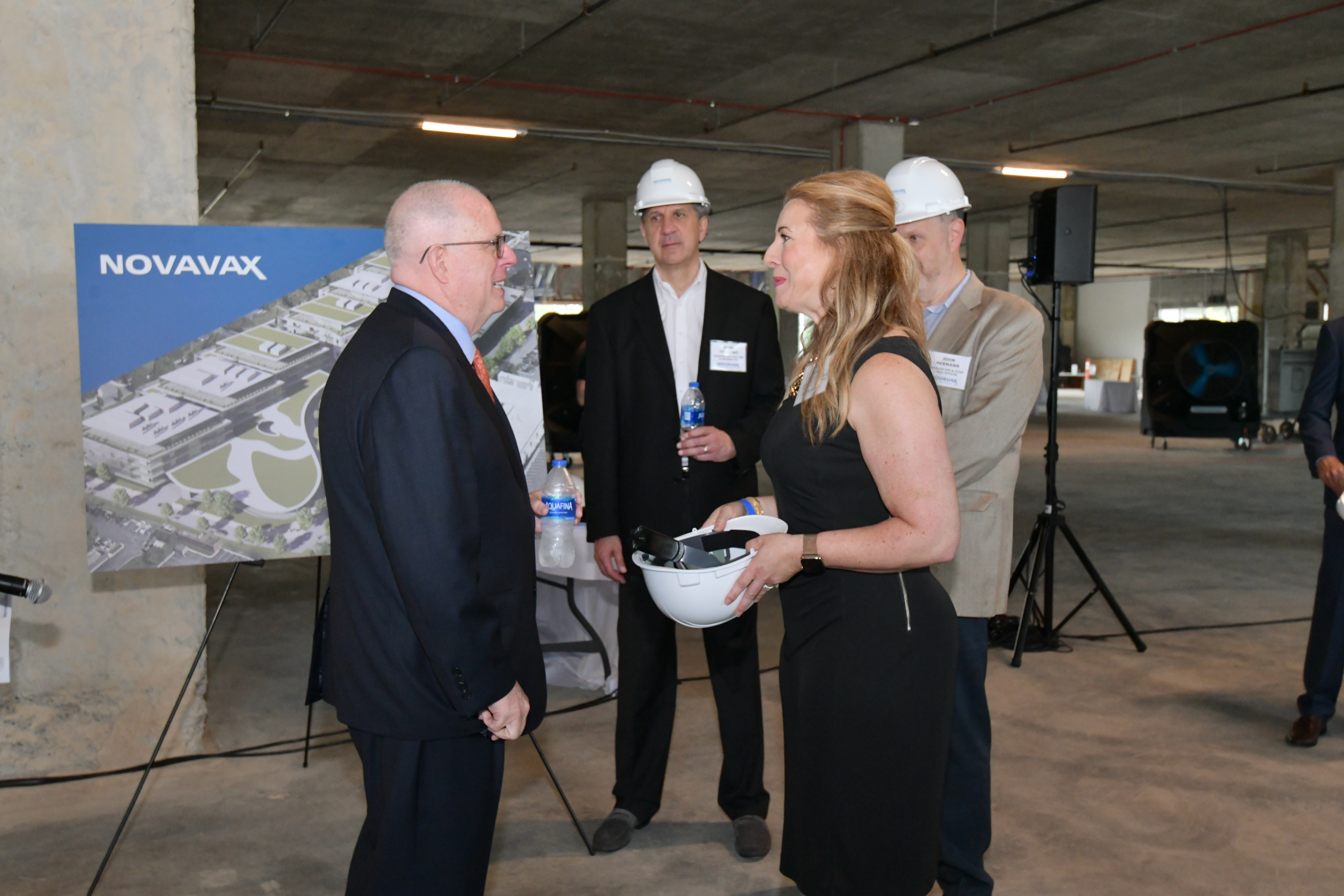
Governor Larry Hogan at Novavax's future Vaccines Innovation Campus and global headquarters in Maryland

In January 2021, the company released phase III trials showing that it has 89% efficacy against Covid-19, and also provides strong immunity against new variants. It has applied for emergency use in the US and UK but will be distributed in the UK first. As of May 2021, the company does not anticipate that it will file for approval in the UK "until July at the earliest". On 14 June 2021, Novavax announced overall 90.4% efficacy in the Phase 3 US and Mexico trial. Of the total 77 cases of COVID-19 among the trial's volunteers, 14 occurred in the vaccine group, while 63 occurred in the placebo group.

On 22 May 2021, Novavax and Moderna announced a deal with the South Korean government to manufacture their COVID-19 vaccines. The vaccine is also being co-developed (with the Coalition for Epidemic Preparedness Innovations) in India under the brand name Covovax. CEPI granted Novavax up to $399 million to support the development of the candidate vaccine.

On 6 September 2021, Novavax and Takeda Pharmaceutical Company announced that the Government of Japan's Ministry of Health, Labour and Welfare will purchase 150 million doses of Novavax's vaccine candidate TAK-019 pending regulatory approval. The Government of Japan's Ministry of Health, Labour and Welfare signed an agreement with Takeda Pharmaceutical Company for Takeda to manufacture and distribute Novavax's TAK-019 upon regulatory approval.

On 22 December 2021, Novavax confirmed the efficacy of two doses of vaccine against the omicron variant of SARS-CoV-2. The new data suggest that the vaccine provides an immune response against the Omicron variant and other variants of COVID-19. The response of antibodies against omicron is four times lower than the original variant. A third dose of the vaccine given to adults, six months after the first two doses, increased the level of neutralizing antibodies against the omicron variant by 73.5 times, making it more effective in preventing omicron from entering human cells.

The data shows that the 73.5-fold increase in antibody level following a third dose of Novavax vaccine (protein subunit vaccine) was higher than the booster doses of Pfizer and Moderna (mRNA vaccines), which increased the antibody levels 25-fold and 37-fold, respectively.

The Novavax COVID-19 vaccine was approved in the European Union at the end of 2021, and in Canada in February 2022, as the fifth vaccine against COVID-19, following Pfizer/BioNTech, Moderna, Janssen and AstraZeneca.

=== Authorization and application ===
On 1 November 2021, Novavax and Serum Institute of India announced that the National Agency of Drug and Food Control of Indonesia, or Badan Peng was Obat dan Makanan (Badan POM), has granted emergency use authorization (EUA) for Novavax' recombinant nanoparticle protein-based COVID-19 vaccine with Matrix-M adjuvant. It will be manufactured by SII in India and marketed by SII in Indonesia under the brand name Covovax.

On 17 December 2021, the World Health Organization (WHO) added Novavax's Covovax vaccine, jointly developed with the Serum Institute of India (SII), to the list of approved coronavirus vaccines for emergency use. The vaccine can then be used in the Covax programme for the supply of vaccines to low and middle income countries. Novavax and SII provide Covax program with 1.1 billion doses of vaccine.

On 20 December 2021, the European Medicines Agency recommended Novavax's Nuvaxovid vaccine for conditional marketing authorisation, which was formally approved by the European Commission, making it the fifth approved COVID-19 vaccine in the European Union after Pfizer/BioNTech, Moderna, Janssen and AstraZeneca.

On 20 January 2022, The Therapeutic Goods Administration (TGA) has granted provisional approval to Biocelect Pty Ltd (on behalf of Novavax Inc) for its COVID-19 vaccine, NUVAXOVID. This is the first protein COVID-19 vaccine to receive regulatory approval in Australia.

On 31 January 2022, Novavax applied to the Federal Drug Administration (FDA) for Emergency Use Authorization (EUA) for NVX-CoV2373, and on 7 June, FDA's panel of outside advisors recommended FDA grant the EUA.

In February 2022, Health Canada authorized Nuvaxovid for the prevention of COVID-19 in adults 18 years of age and older.

On 13 July 2022, the U.S. Food and Drug Administration issued an emergency use authorization (EUA) for the Novavax COVID-19 Vaccine, Adjuvanted for the prevention of COVID-19 caused by severe acute respiratory syndrome coronavirus 2 (SARS-CoV-2) in individuals 18 years of age and older.

In July 2023, Novavax announced that it has received full Marketing Authorization from the European Commission for its COVID-19 vaccine, Nuvaxovid (NVX-CoV2373), allowing its use as a primary series in individuals aged 12 and older and as a booster dose in adults aged 18 and older. The authorization establishes a foundation for future regulatory approvals and Novavax plans to seek full approval in the United States and other markets while emphasizing the importance of vaccine choice in public health measures.

In early October 2023, the FDA amended the EUA to include the reformulated Novavax vaccine "updated to include the spike protein from the SARS-CoV-2 Omicron variant lineage XBB.1.5 (2023–2024 formula)" for age 12 and above.

In December 2023, the WHO provided prequalification status to the R21/Matrix-M malaria vaccine developed by the University of Oxford and the Serum Institute of India.

The COVID vaccine targeting the JN.1 strain was authorized for use in the European union in October 2024.

In April 2025, Novavax was still in the process of obtaining full licensure for its COVID-19 vaccine, having submitted a Biologics License Application to the FDA, who requested Novavax complete an additional clinical trial.

In May 2025, Novavax received FDA approval for its COVID-19 vaccine for adults 65 years or over. Nuvaxovid is also indicated for individuals 12 through 64 who have at least one underlying condition that puts them at high risk for severe outcomes from COVID-19.
