= ISCOM =

Immune stimulating complex, in immunology

Immune stimulating complexes (ISCOMs) are spherical open cage-like structures (typically 40 nm in diameter) that are spontaneously formed when mixing together cholesterol, phospholipids and Quillaja saponins under a specific stoichiometry. The complex displays immune stimulating properties and is thus mainly used as a vaccine adjuvant in order to induce a stronger immune response and longer protection. A specific adjuvant based on ISCOM technology is Matrix-M.

Some experimentally solved structures of ISCOMs can be seen in Pedersen et al. (2012).

== History ==
ISCOM technology was invented in 1982 by Professor Bror Morein at the Swedish University of Agricultural Sciences in Uppsala. The key components of ISCOMs are the Quillaja saponins, which are derived from the bark of the Chilean soap-bark tree Quillaja saponaria Molina. Quillaja saponins are well known for their ability to activate the immune system. It is also known that saponins in general can have toxic side-effects, including the induction of haemolysis. However, when Quillaia saponins, cholesterol and phospholipids are mixed under the specific stoichiometry that forms ISCOMs, this haemolytic activity is practically eliminated, while the adjuvant activity is retained.

== Immunological advantages ==
ISCOM-Matrix technology offers several immunological and practical advantages over currently available adjuvants. Most adjuvants on the market today mainly activate the humoral immune response (i.e. give an antibody response). There is, however, a clear need for adjuvants able to induce a cell-mediated immune response as well. ISCOM technology generally induces strong activation of both the cell-mediated (Th1 response) and the humoral arms (Th2 response) of the immune system. This generates all classes and sub-classes of antibodies, as well as potent cellular responses, e.g. cytotoxic T lymphocytes.

This strong induction of the cellular response is one of the hallmarks of ISCOM-Matrix technology. A cell-mediated immune response is crucial for effective vaccination against intracellular pathogens and chronic infections. Moreover, the technology is highly efficient; its long-lasting immune responses allow reduction of the antigen dose. Typically, the dose can be decreased by a factor of 10 to 100, which will significantly cut the production cost of the vaccine. ISCOM-Matrix technology can also be of immense value in a situation when manufacturing capacity is inadequate in the face of an emerging threat such as an influenza pandemic.

ISCOM technology is also able to induce an adaptive immune response in the presence of pre-existing antibodies, for example in new-borns who have maternal antibodies.

The chemical stability of ISCOM-Matrix is of significant practical value. ISCOMs have demonstrated a shelf-life of several years during storage in aqueous solutions at +2-8 °C (compared to months for free saponins).

Since the ISCOM-Matrix is simply mixed with the antigen post-manufacturing, it offers great production advantages and flexibility in vaccine design. If required, however, the antigen can also be incorporated into the structure.

== See also ==
- Immunologic adjuvant
- Immune system
- Immunology
- Immunization
- Inoculation
- Virosomes
- Vaccination
- Isconova
- Matrix-M
