= Novavax COVID-19 vaccine =

Vaccine against COVID-19

Vaccine description
- Target: SARS-CoV-2
- Vaccine type: Subunit

Clinical data
- Trade names: Covovax, Nuvaxovid
- Other names: NVX-CoV2373; TAK-019; SARS-CoV-2 rS; COVID-19 Vaccine (recombinant protein); NVX-CoV2601
- AHFS/Drugs.com: Monograph
- License data: US DailyMed: Nuvaxovid
- Pregnancy category: AU: B1
- Routes of administration: Intramuscular
- ATC code: J07BN05 (WHO)

Legal status
- Legal status: AU: S4 (Prescription only); CA: ℞-only / Schedule D; UK: POM (Prescription only); US: ℞-only; EU: Rx-only; Full list of Novavax vaccine authorizations

Identifiers
- CAS Number: 2502099-58-1
- DrugBank: DB15810
- UNII: UK9AK2IN1P
- KEGG: D12336

The Novavax COVID-19 vaccine, sold under the brand names Nuvaxovid and Covovax, among others, is a subunit COVID-19 vaccine developed by Novavax and the Coalition for Epidemic Preparedness Innovations.

Updated versions of the vaccine have been developed to provide coverage against the Omicron variant, with different formulas for 2023–2024 (containing a recombinant spike protein from lineage XBB.1.5) and 2024–2025 (containing recombinant spike protein from lineage JN.1).

== Medical uses ==
The Novavax COVID‑19 vaccine is indicated for active immunization to prevent COVID‑19 caused by SARS-CoV-2.

In the US, Nuvaxovid is indicated for active immunization to prevent COVID‑19 caused by SARS-CoV-2 in adults aged 65 years of age and older. Nuvaxovid is also indicated for individuals aged 12 through 64 years of age who have at least one underlying condition that puts them at high risk for severe outcomes from COVID-19.

=== Efficacy ===
In December 2021, Novavax reported that its phase III trial showed the vaccine achieved its primary endpoint of preventing infection at least seven days after the second dose. Overall efficacy against different SARS-CoV-2s was 90.4% and efficacy against moderate-to-severe disease was 100%.

A vaccine is generally considered effective if the estimate is ≥50% with a >30% lower limit of the 95% confidence interval. Efficacy is closely related to effectiveness, which is generally expected to slowly decrease over time.

Efficacy by variant
Doses	Severity of illness	Omicron	Delta	Alpha	Gamma	Beta	Others circulating previously
1	Symptomatic	Not reported	Not reported	83% (74–90%) (Note: 28 September 2020 to January 2021, United Kingdom. According to Nextstrain, during this period, the Alpha variant completely replaced the previously dominant lineage B.1.282 by the end of October.)	Not reported	Not reported	83% (74–90%)
1	Hospitalization	Not reported	Not reported	Not reported	Not reported	Not reported	Not reported
2	Symptomatic	Not reported	Not reported	86% (71–94%)	Not reported	51% (−1 to 76%)	96% (74–99%)
2	Hospitalization	Not reported	Not reported	100% (Note: No cases detected.)	Not reported	Not reported	100%

== Side effects ==
The most common side effects include fever, headache, nausea, muscle and joint pain, tenderness and pain at the injection site, tiredness, and feeling unwell.

Additional possible side effects include anaphylaxis (severe allergic reaction), paresthesia (unusual feeling in the skin, such as tingling or a crawling sensation) and hypoesthesia (decreased feeling or sensitivity, especially in the skin), and pericarditis (inflammation of lining around the heart). It has also been reported that myocarditis (inflammation of heart muscle cells) as reported incidence from receiving the NVX-CoV2373 vaccine.

Tinnitus is a possible side effect.

== Handling and administration ==
The vaccine requires two doses and is stable at 2 to 8 °C (36 to 46 °F) refrigerated temperatures. The second dose can be administered three to eight weeks after the first dose. The vaccine injection is administered intramuscularly. There are no drug interactions that may affect the vaccine's efficacy if administered with other vaccines at the same time.

== Pregnancy and breastfeeding ==
The vaccine is a recombinant protein, not a live virus, therefore it will not replicate and spread to the infant.

There are no studies conducted to trial the efficacy and safety of Novavax vaccine to people who are breastfeeding.

== Technology ==
NVX-CoV2373 has been described as both a protein subunit vaccine and a virus-like particle vaccine, although the producers call it a "recombinant nanoparticle vaccine".

The vaccine is produced by creating an engineered baculovirus containing a gene for a modified SARS-CoV-2 spike protein. The spike protein was modified by incorporating two proline amino acids in order to stabilize the pre-fusion form of the protein; this same 2P modification is being used in several other COVID‑19 vaccines. The baculovirus is made to infect a culture of Sf9 moth cells, which then create the spike protein and display it on their cell membranes. The spike proteins are harvested and assembled onto a synthetic lipid nanoparticle about 50 nanometers across, each displaying up to 14 spike proteins.

The formulation includes a saponin-based adjuvant named Matrix-M.

Matrix-M adjuvant is sourced from saponins originating from the Quillaja saponaria tree. Matrix-M adjuvant is combined with the spike protein from the SARS-CoV-2 antigen to induce immune response in body upon vaccination. The adjuvant primarily enhances local antibodies and immunity at the local site of injection and draining lymph nodes. The adjuvant demonstrates its protection against the virus by inducing innate immune system rapidly. At the local site of injection, the adjuvant recruits antigen presenting cells and attracts more T cells, such as CD4+ and CD8+ T cells. After entry of the vaccine nanoparticle containing the recombinant spike protein of the virus, it binds to ACE2 (angiotensin-converting enzyme 2) receptor to allow endocytosis and viral replication. However, upon endocytosis these viral particles are digested by lysosome and presented to MHC class molecules. This will lead to attracting T cells (CD4+ and CD8+). This chemokine activity is further enhanced by the presence of the adjuvant component to enhance immune response from the viral particle. The cascade of immune activation leads to immediate immune response to target the virus as well as creating memory B cells specific to the antigen that the virus have. These memory B cells enhances our immune response by faster immune cell recognition of these subsequent viral exposure to the same antigen compared to the initial exposure.

== Manufacturing ==
In February 2021, Novavax partnered with Takeda to manufacture the vaccine in Japan, where its COVID‑19 vaccine candidate is known as TAK-019.

Novavax signed an agreement with Serum Institute of India for mass scale production for developing and low-income countries. In 2020 it was reported, that the vaccine would be manufactured in Spain and in November 2021 it was reported to be produced in Poland by Mabion SA, a Contract Development and Manufacturing Organisation (CDMO). As of 2021, antigens were made at Novavax's factory Novavax CZ in the Czech Republic; Novavax CZ was also marketing authorisation holder of its EU authorization.

In May 2021, Serum Institute of India said that it started the production of the Novavax COVID‑19 vaccine candidate branded as Covovax in India after receiving permission from the Indian government.

== History ==
In January 2020, Novavax announced development of a vaccine candidate, codenamed NVX-CoV2373, to establish immunity to SARS-CoV-2. Novavax's work is in competition for vaccine development among dozens of other companies.

In March 2020, Novavax announced a collaboration with Emergent BioSolutions for preclinical and early-stage human research on the vaccine candidate. Under the partnership, Emergent BioSolutions was supposed to manufacture the vaccine at large scale at their Baltimore facility. However, following production issues with the Johnson & Johnson and Oxford–AstraZeneca vaccines at its Baltimore plant and to decrease the burden on the plant, Novavax subsequently partnered with a different manufacturer in a new agreement overseen by the US government.

Trials have also taken place in the United Kingdom. The first human safety studies of the candidate, codenamed NVX-CoV2373, started in May 2020 in Australia.

In July 2020, the company announced it might receive US$1.6 billion from Operation Warp Speed to expedite development of its coronavirus vaccine candidate by 2021 – if clinical trials show the vaccine to be effective. A spokesperson for Novavax stated that the $1.6 billion was coming from a "collaboration" between the Department of Health and Human Services and Department of Defense.

In 2024, Novavax announced a deal with Sanofi in which Sanofi would take over commercialization responsibilities for NVX-CoV2373 in most countries starting in 2025. The deal also allows them to use the vaccine and Matrix-M to develop new vaccine products.

An adapted version of the vaccine with the brand name Nuvaxovid XBB.1.5 is available. It contains a version of the protein from the Omicron XBB.1.5 subvariant of SARS-CoV-2.

In October 2024, the CHMP gave a positive opinion to update the composition of Nuvaxovid, a vaccine to target the SARS-CoV-2 JN.1 variant of the virus that causes COVID-19 following the recommendations issued by EMA's Emergency Task Force to update COVID-19 vaccines for the 2024/2025 vaccination campaign.

=== Clinical trials ===
==== Phase I and II ====
In May 2020, Australia's first human trials of a candidate COVID‑19 vaccine, Novavax's NVX-CoV2373, began in Melbourne. It involved about 130 volunteers aged between 18 and 59.

==== Phase III ====
In September 2020, Novavax started a phase III trial with 15,000 participants in the UK.

In December 2020, Novavax started the PREVENT-19 (NCT04611802) phase III trial in the US and Mexico, funded by NIAID and BARDA.

In May 2021, Novavax initiated a pediatric expansion for the phase III clinical trial, with 3,000 adolescents 12–17 years of age in up to 75 sites in the United States.

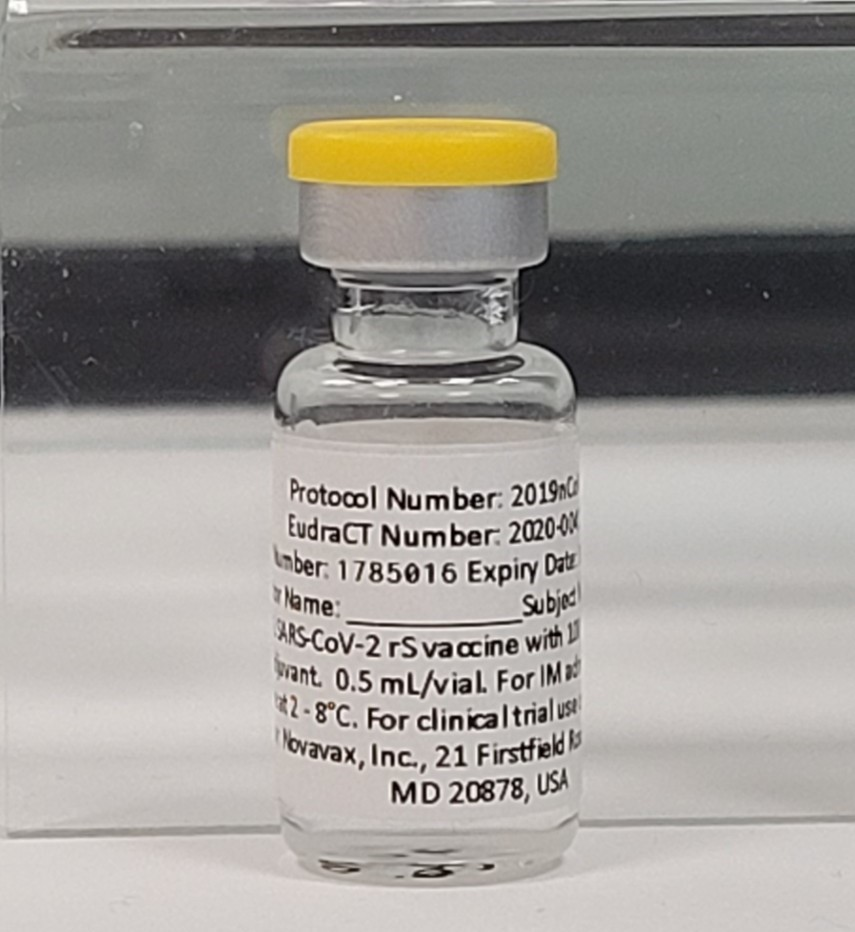
Vial of vaccine from clinical trials at Thackray Museum of Medicine

==== UK trial ====
In January 2021, Novavax reported that preliminary results from the United Kingdom trial showed that its vaccine candidate was more than 89% effective.

The Thackray Museum of Medicine in Leeds hosted the largest cohort of volunteers. Trials of the Novavax vaccine were conducted on 5,000 people there during 2021.

In June 2021, a primary Novavax-funded study found that the vaccine has an overall efficacy of 83.4% two weeks after the first dose and 89.7% one week after the second dose. A post hoc analysis showed an efficacy of 86.3% against the B.1.1.7 (Alpha) variant and 96.4% against "non-B.1.1.7 strains", the majority of which were the "prototype strains" (original strain).

==== South Africa trial ====
In January 2021, Novavax reported that interim results from a trial in South Africa showed a lower effectiveness rate against the Beta variant (lineage B.1.351), at around 50–60%.

In a study reported in March and May 2021, the efficacy of the Novavax vaccine (NVX-CoV2373) was tested in a preliminary randomized, placebo-controlled study involving 2684 participants who were negative for COVID at baseline testing. The Beta variant was the predominant variant to occur, with post-hoc analysis indicating a cross-protective vaccine efficacy of Novavax against Beta of 51.0% for HIV-negative participants.

==== US and Mexico trial ====
In June 2021, Novavax announced overall 90.4% efficacy in the phase III US and Mexico trial that involved nearly 30,000 people aged 18 years of age and older. From the total 77 COVID-19 cases found in the trial participants, 14 occurred in the vaccine group, while 63 occurred in the placebo group.

=== Administration ===
About 216,000 doses of the Novavax COVID-19 vaccine were administered in the EU/EEA from authorization to 26 June 2022.

== Legal status ==
In February 2021, the European Medicines Agency (EMA) started a rolling review of the Novavax COVID-19 vaccine (NVX‑CoV2373). In November 2021, the EMA received application for conditional marketing authorization. In December 2021, the European Commission granted a conditional marketing authorization across the EU, following a recommendation from the EMA, for it to be sold under the brand name Nuvaxovid.

As of November 2021, it had been authorized for use in Indonesia, the Philippines, as of December in India, as of January 2022 in South Korea, Australia, as of February 2022 in the United Kingdom, Canada, Taiwan, and Singapore. As of December 2021 it was validated by the World Health Organization.

During June 2022 a US Food and Drug Administration (FDA) advisory committee voted 21–0 with one abstention to recommend authorization of Novavax's vaccine for use in adults. In July 2022, the FDA authorized NVX-CoV2373 for emergency use as a primary immunization (not booster) in adults. COVID-19 Vaccine, Adjuvanted making it the fourth COVID‑19 vaccine authorized in the US. In July 2022, the US Centers for Disease Control and Prevention (CDC) recommended the Novavax COVID‑19 vaccine as a two-dose primary series for adults age 18 and older, thus endorsing the recommendation from the Advisory Committee on Immunization Practices (ACIP) regarding this vaccine. In August 2022, the FDA granted Emergency Use Authorization for the Novavax COVID‑19 vaccine in people aged 12–17 years. In August 2022, the CDC recommended the Novavax COVID‑19 vaccine for adolescents aged 12–17 years.

In October 2023, the FDA amended the emergency use authorization of the Novavax COVID-19 Vaccine, Adjuvanted for use in individuals 12 years of age and older to include the Novavax COVID-19 Vaccine, Adjuvanted (2023–2024 Formula) and removed the authorization for the Novavax COVID-19 Vaccine, Adjuvanted (Original monovalent).

In January 2024, it was authorized in Brazil.

In August 2024, the FDA granted emergency use authorization for an updated version of the Novavax COVID-19 that includes a monovalent (single) component that corresponds to the Omicron variant JN.1 strain of SARS-CoV-2. The Novavax COVID-19 Vaccine, Adjuvanted (2023-2024 Formula) is no longer authorized for use. The FDA granted the emergency use authorization of the Novavax COVID-19 Vaccine, Adjuvanted (2024-2025 Formula) to Novavax Inc. of Gaithersburg, Maryland.

In October 2024, the CHMP gave a positive opinion to update the composition of Nuvaxovid, a vaccine to target the SARS-CoV-2 JN.1 variant of the virus that causes COVID-19 following the recommendations issued by EMA's Emergency Task Force to update COVID-19 vaccines for the 2024/2025 vaccination campaign.
