= Serum Institute of India =

Indian biotechnology and biopharmaceuticals company

Coordinates: 18.505110°N 73.945453°E

Serum Institute of India Private Limited
- Type: Private
- Industry: Biotechnology; Biopharmaceuticals
- Founded: 1966; 60 years ago
- Founder: Cyrus S. Poonawalla (Chairman & MD)
- Headquarters: 212/2, Hadapsar, Pune, India
- Area served: Worldwide
- Key people: Adar Poonawalla (CEO)
- Products: Vaccines; biopharmaceuticals; generic drugs; over-the-counter drugs
- Revenue: ▲₹25,646 crore (US$3.47 billion) (FY22)
- Operating income: ▲₹17,562 crore (US$2.38 billion) (FY22)
- Net income: ▲₹11,116 crore (US$1.5 billion) (FY22)
- Parent: Cyrus Poonawalla Group
- Subsidiaries: Bilthoven Biologicals BV; Vakzine Projekt Management GmbH
- Website: www.seruminstitute.com

Serum Institute of India (SII) is an Indian multinational biotechnology and biopharmaceuticals company, based in Pune. It is the world's largest manufacturer of vaccines by volume. It was founded by Cyrus Poonawalla in 1966, and is a part of Cyrus Poonawalla Group.

== History ==
The Serum Institute of India was founded in 1966 in the city of Pune, India. The company set out to produce immunobiologicals, which were then being imported into India at high prices. Among the first products the Serum Institute of India manufactured in large quantities were the tetanus antitoxin, snake antivenom, DPT vaccine, and MMR vaccine. The company's product lines was expanded to include different types of vaccines against bacterial or virus infections, combination vaccines, influenza vaccine, and meningococcal vaccine. Besides vaccine, the company also manufactures antisera, blood plasma, and hormone products. As of 2014, the vaccines manufactured by the Serum Institute of India have been used in international vaccination programmes run by the World Health Organization (WHO), UNICEF, and the Pan American Health Organization (PAHO). The Serum Institute of India is run by the Poonawalla Group and engages in research, development, and manufacturing.

In 2009, the company began developing an intranasal swine flu vaccine. In 2012, the company's first international acquisition was Bilthoven Biologicals, a biopharmaceutical company in Netherlands. In 2016, with support from US-based Mass Biologics of University of Massachusetts Medical School, the Serum Institute of India invented a fast-acting anti-rabies agent, Rabies Human Monoclonal Antibody (RMAb), also known as Rabbishield.

As of 2023, the company is the world's largest vaccine producer by number of doses produced, manufacturing around 1.9 billion doses of vaccines each year with plans to produce 4 billion doses of vaccines. The products developed include tuberculosis vaccine Tubervac (BCG), Poliovac for poliomyelitis, and other vaccinations for the childhood vaccination schedule.

== Notable vaccine projects ==
=== COVID-19 vaccine development ===
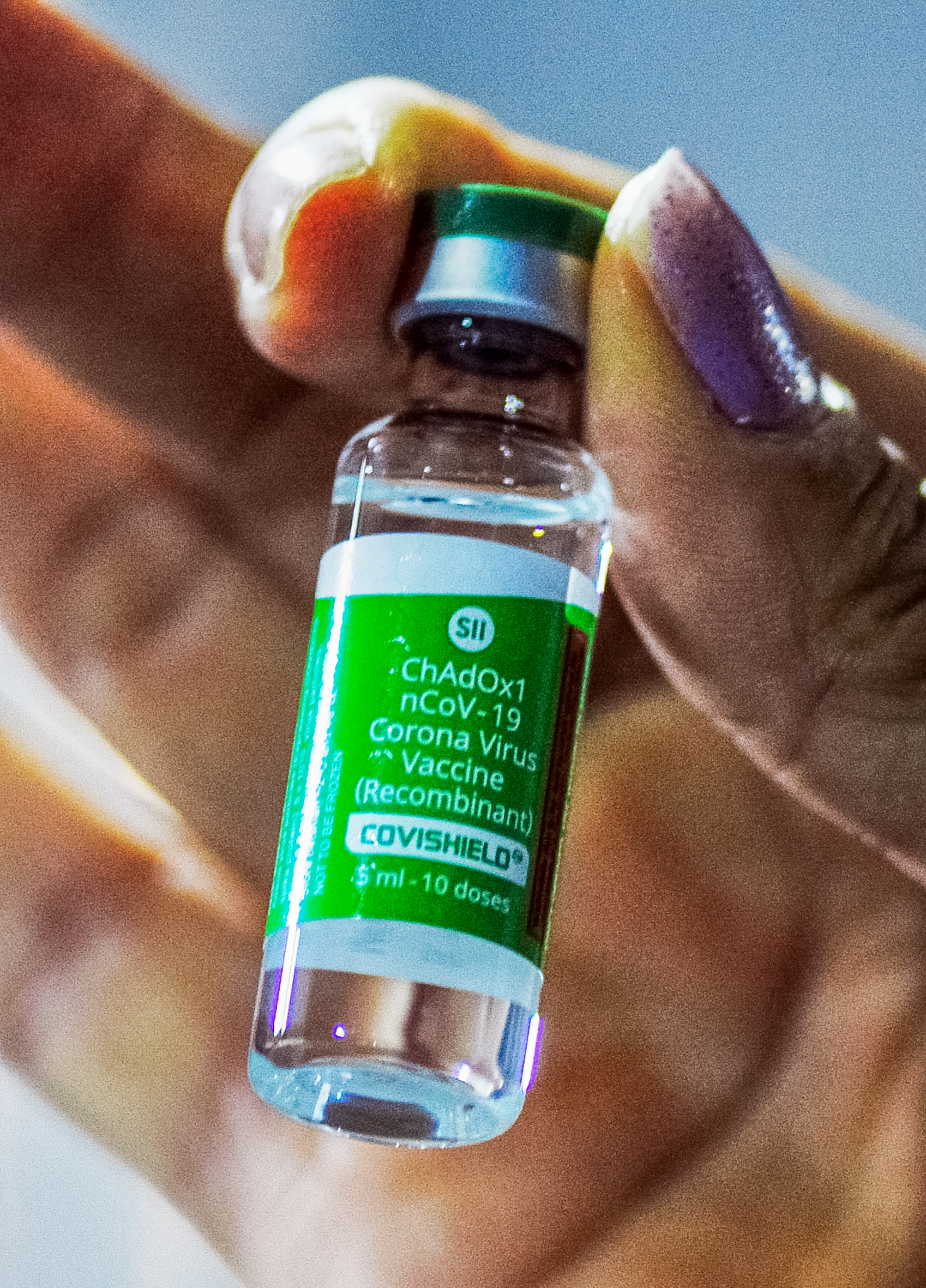
A vial of the Oxford-AstraZeneca COVID-19 vaccine that is locally produced in the Serum Institute of India (SII) as "Covishield" COVID-19 vaccine

Serum Institute of India partnered with the British-Swedish multinational pharmaceutical company AstraZeneca for developing AZD1222 (Covishield) in partnership with the University of Oxford. It was reported that Serum Institute of India would provide 100 million (10 crore) doses of the vaccine for India and other low and middle-income countries. This target was later increased to 1 billion doses by the end of 2021. It was estimated to be priced at ₹225 (around $3) per dose. In September 2020, trials were halted by DCGI after a volunteer in Oxford developed illness following vaccination, but were soon resumed after consent by the British regulators. In December 2020, the Serum Institute of India sought emergency approval for the vaccine developed with AstraZeneca, which was approved a month later. In March 2021, an agreement was reached to supply some doses to the UK.

Serum Institute of India also reached an agreement with Novavax for the production of Novavax's NVX-CoV2373 (Covovax) vaccine for India and other low and middle-income countries. The company would also produce Codagenix's nasally administered COVID-19 vaccine CDX-005 (tradename COVI-VAC).

The company also manufactured Sputnik V vaccine in India in collaboration with Gamaleya Research Institute of Epidemiology and Microbiology after receiving approval from DCGI. On 13 July 2021, RDIF published a press release saying SII is starting the production of Sputnik V doses in September 2021, with the intention to produce over 300 million doses of the vaccine in India per year.

In March 2021, Reuters reported that Chinese state-backed cyber-espionage group Red Apollo targeted the Serum Institute of India's intellectual property for exfiltration.

=== R21/Matrix-M malaria vaccine ===
On 8 October 2023, the R21/Matrix-M malaria vaccine received a recommendation for use by the Strategic Advisory Group of Experts (SAGE) of the World Health Organization and the Malaria Policy Advisory Group (MPAG). The vaccine, jointly developed by The University of Oxford and the Serum Institute of India in collaboration with Novavax's adjuvant technology, demonstrated notable efficacy along with a positive safety profile. Furthermore, the Serum Institute of India had successfully established production capacity for 100 million doses annually, with plans to double this capacity over the next two years.

The R21/Matrix-MTM malaria vaccine was jointly developed by the Jenner Institute at Oxford University and Serum Institute of India, with support from various organizations including the European and Developing Countries Clinical Trials Partnership (EDCTP), the Wellcome Trust, and the European Investment Bank (EIB). As of now, the vaccine has obtained licenses for use in Ghana, Nigeria, and Burkina Faso.

== See also ==
- Bharat Biotech
- Biological E. Limited
- Biotechnology in India
- Pfizer
