= Vaccine =

Preparation for acquired immunity to disease

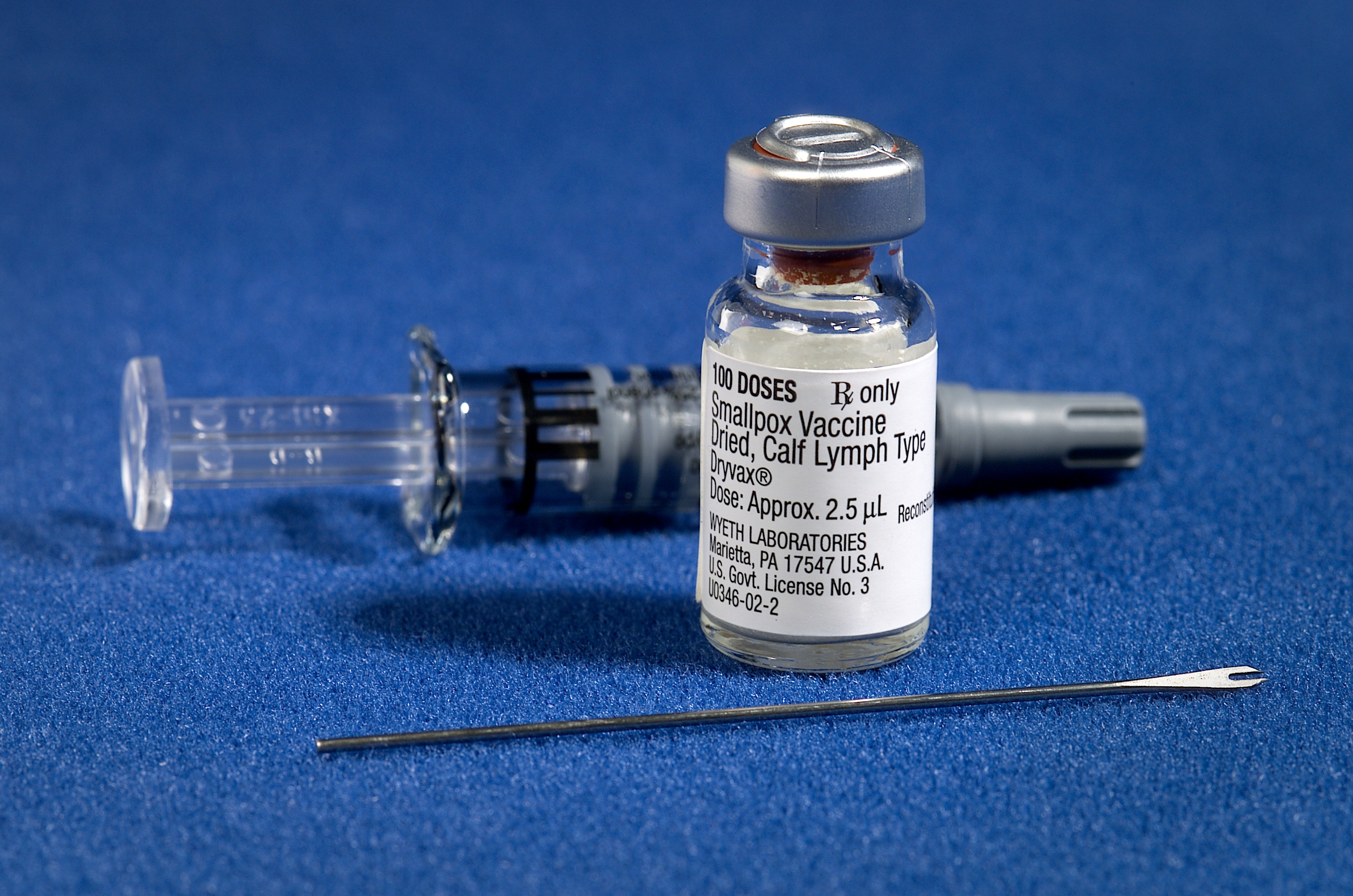
- Smallpox vaccine and equipment for administering it
- MeSH: D014612

A vaccine is a biological preparation that provides active acquired immunity to a particular infectious or malignant disease. The safety and effectiveness of vaccines has been widely studied and verified. A vaccine typically contains an agent that resembles a disease-causing microorganism and is often made from weakened or killed forms of the microbe, its toxins, or one of its surface proteins. The agent stimulates the immune system to recognize the agent as a threat, destroy it, and recognize further and destroy any of the microorganisms associated with that agent that it may encounter in the future.

Vaccines can be prophylactic (to prevent or alleviate the effects of a future infection by a natural or "wild" pathogen), or therapeutic (to fight a disease that has already occurred, such as cancer). Some vaccines offer full sterilizing immunity, in which infection is prevented.

The administration of vaccines is called vaccination. Vaccination is the most effective method of preventing infectious diseases; widespread immunity due to vaccination is largely responsible for the worldwide eradication of smallpox and the restriction of diseases such as polio, measles, and tetanus from much of the world. The World Health Organization (WHO) reports that licensed vaccines are available for twenty-five different preventable infections.

The first recorded use of inoculation to prevent smallpox (see variolation) occurred in the 16th century in China, with the earliest hints of the practice in China coming during the 10th century. It was also the first disease for which a vaccine was produced. The folk practice of inoculation against smallpox was brought from Turkey to Britain in 1721 by Lady Mary Wortley Montagu. The terms vaccine and vaccination are derived from Variolae vaccinae (smallpox of the cow), the term devised by Edward Jenner (who both developed the concept of vaccines and created the first vaccine) to denote cowpox. He used the phrase in 1798 for the long title of his Inquiry into the Variolae vaccinae Known as the Cow Pox, in which he described the protective effect of cowpox against smallpox. In 1881, to honor Jenner, Louis Pasteur proposed that the terms should be extended to cover the new protective inoculations then being developed. The science of vaccine development and production is termed vaccinology.

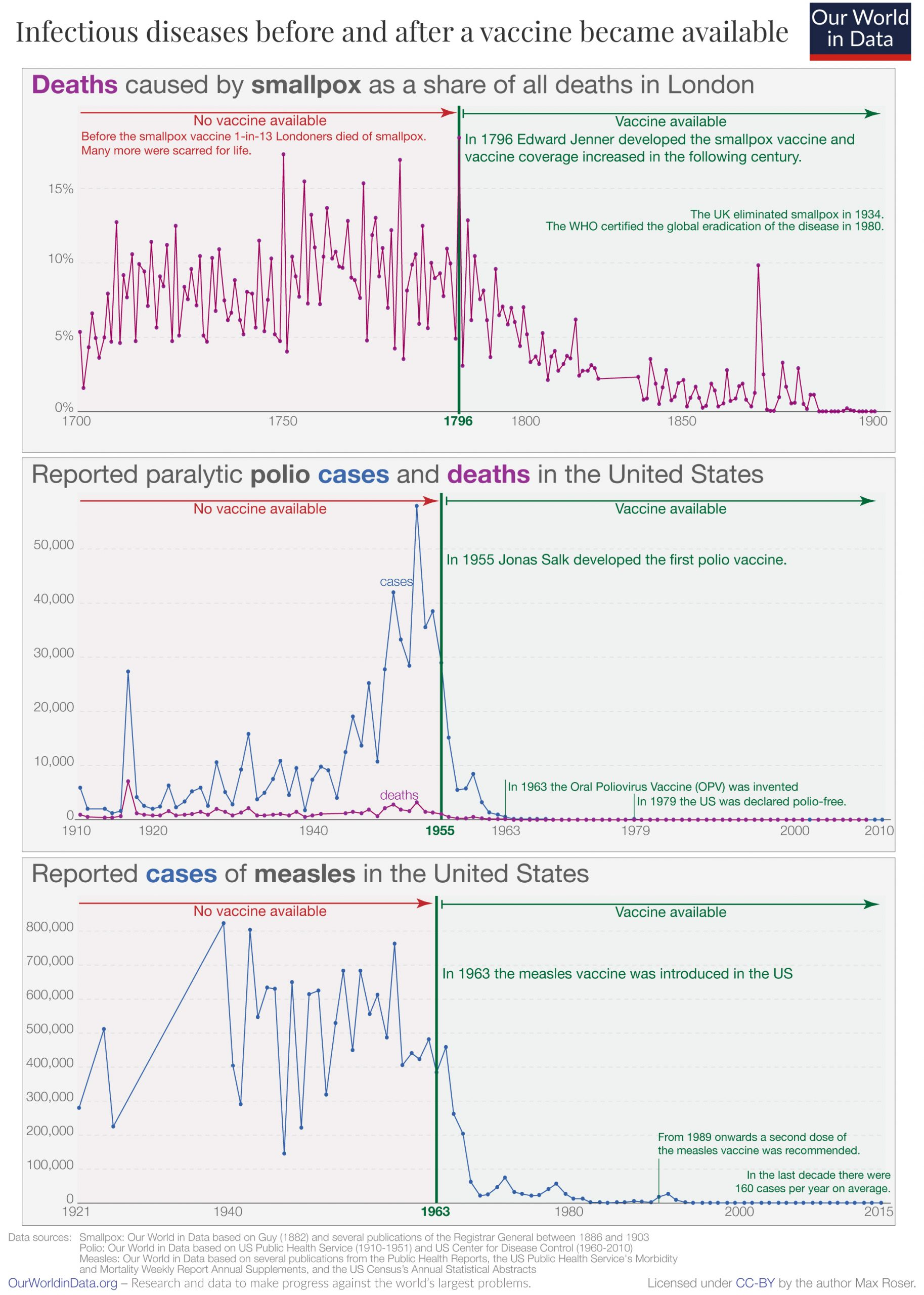
Infectious diseases before and after a vaccine was introduced. Vaccinations have a direct effect on the diminishment of the number of cases and contributes indirectly to a diminishment of the number of deaths.

== Effectiveness ==
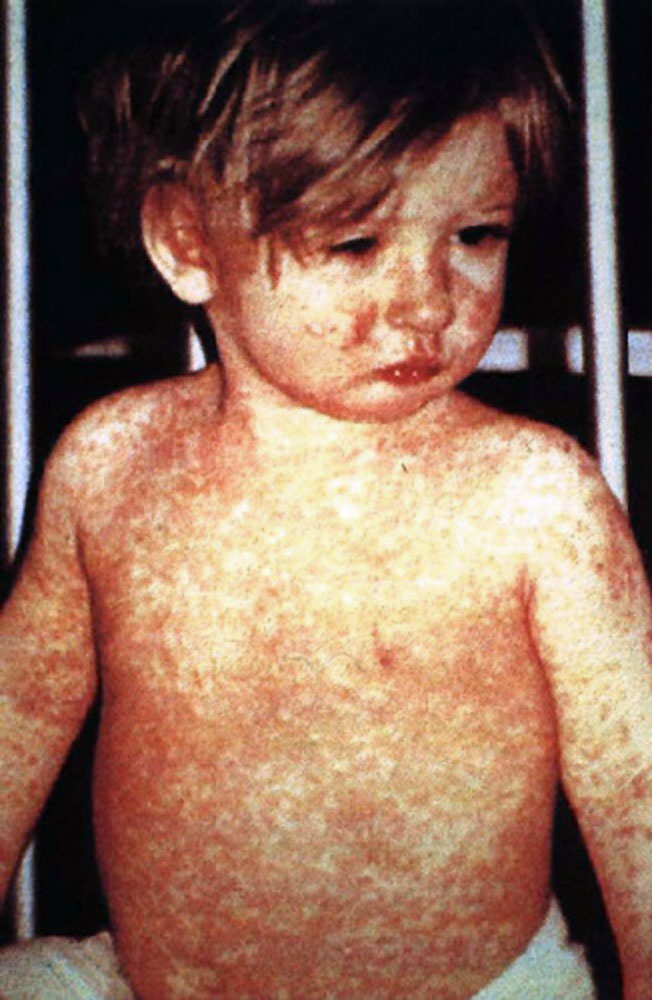
A child with measles, a vaccine-preventable disease

There is overwhelming scientific consensus that vaccines are a very safe and effective way to fight and eradicate infectious diseases. The immune system recognizes vaccine agents as foreign, destroys them, and "remembers" them. When the virulent version of an agent is encountered, the body recognizes the protein coat on the agent, and thus is prepared to respond, by first neutralizing the target agent before it can enter cells, and secondly by recognizing and destroying infected cells before that agent can multiply to vast numbers.

In 1958, there were 763,094 cases of measles in the United States; 552 deaths resulted. After the introduction of new vaccines, the number of cases dropped to fewer than 150 per year (median of 56). In early 2008, there were 64 suspected cases of measles. Fifty-four of those infections were associated with importation from another country, although only thirteen percent were actually acquired outside the United States; 63 of the 64 individuals either had never been vaccinated against measles or were uncertain whether they had been vaccinated.

The measles vaccine is estimated to prevent a million deaths every year.

Vaccines led to the eradication of smallpox, one of the most contagious and deadly diseases in humans. Other diseases such as rubella, polio, measles, mumps, chickenpox, and typhoid are nowhere near as common as they were a hundred years ago thanks to widespread vaccination programs. As long as the vast majority of people are vaccinated, it is much more difficult for an outbreak of disease to occur, let alone spread. This effect is called herd immunity. Polio, which is transmitted only among humans, is targeted by an extensive eradication campaign that has seen endemic polio restricted to only parts of three countries (Afghanistan, Nigeria, and Pakistan). However, the difficulty of reaching all children, cultural misunderstandings, and disinformation have caused the anticipated eradication date to be missed several times.

Vaccines also help prevent the development of antibiotic resistance. For example, by greatly reducing the incidence of pneumonia caused by Streptococcus pneumoniae, vaccine programs have greatly reduced the prevalence of infections resistant to penicillin or other first-line antibiotics.

=== Limitations ===
Limitations to their effectiveness, nevertheless, exist. Sometimes, protection fails for vaccine-related reasons such as failures in vaccine attenuation, vaccination regimens or administration.

Failure may also occur for host-related reasons if the host's immune system does not respond adequately or at all. Host-related lack of response occurs in an estimated 2–10% of individuals, due to factors including genetics, immune status, age, health and nutritional status. One type of primary immunodeficiency disorder resulting in genetic failure is X-linked agammaglobulinemia, in which the absence of an enzyme essential for B cell development prevents the host's immune system from generating antibodies to a pathogen.

Host–pathogen interactions and responses to infection are dynamic processes involving multiple pathways in the immune system. A host does not develop antibodies instantaneously: while the body's innate immunity may be activated in as little as twelve hours, adaptive immunity can take 1–2 weeks to fully develop. During that time, the host can still become infected.

Once antibodies are produced, they may promote immunity in any of several ways, depending on the class of antibodies involved. Their success in clearing or inactivating a pathogen will depend on the amount of antibodies produced and on the extent to which those antibodies are effective at countering the strain of the pathogen involved, since different strains may be differently susceptible to a given immune reaction. In some cases vaccines may result in partial immune protection (in which immunity is less than 100% effective but still reduces risk of infection) or in temporary immune protection (in which immunity wanes over time) rather than full or permanent immunity. They can still raise the reinfection threshold for the population as a whole and make a substantial impact. They can also mitigate the severity of infection, resulting in a lower mortality rate, lower morbidity, faster recovery from illness, and a wide range of other effects.

Those who are older often display less of a response than those who are younger, a pattern known as Immunosenescence. Adjuvants commonly are used to boost immune response, particularly for older people whose immune response to a simple vaccine may have weakened.

The efficacy or performance of the vaccine is dependent on several factors:

- the disease itself (for some diseases vaccination performs better than for others)
- the strain of vaccine (some vaccines are specific to, or at least most effective against, particular strains of the disease)
- whether the vaccination schedule has been properly observed.
- idiosyncratic response to vaccination; some individuals are "non-responders" to certain vaccines, meaning that they do not generate antibodies even after being vaccinated correctly.
- assorted factors such as ethnicity, age, or genetic predisposition.

If a vaccinated individual does develop the disease vaccinated against (breakthrough infection), the disease is likely to be less severe and less transmissible than in unvaccinated cases.

Important considerations in an effective vaccination program:

1. careful modeling to anticipate the effect that an immunization campaign will have on the epidemiology of the disease in the medium to long term
2. ongoing surveillance for the relevant disease following introduction of a new vaccine
3. maintenance of high immunization rates, even when a disease has become rare

== Safety ==
Vaccinations given to children, adolescents, or adults are generally safe. Adverse effects, if any, are generally mild. The rate of side effects depends on the vaccine in question. Some common side effects include fever, pain around the injection site, and muscle aches. Additionally, some individuals may be allergic to ingredients in the vaccine. The MMR vaccine is rarely associated with febrile seizures.

Host-("vaccinee")-related determinants that render a person susceptible to infection, such as genetics, health status (underlying disease, nutrition, pregnancy, sensitivities or allergies), immune competence, age, and economic impact or cultural environment can be primary or secondary factors affecting the severity of infection and response to a vaccine. Elderly (above age 60), allergen-hypersensitive, and obese people have susceptibility to compromised immunogenicity, which prevents or inhibits vaccine effectiveness, possibly requiring separate vaccine technologies for these specific populations or repetitive booster vaccinations to limit virus transmission.

Severe side effects are extremely rare. Varicella vaccine is rarely associated with complications in immunodeficient individuals, and rotavirus vaccines are moderately associated with intussusception.

At least 19 countries have no-fault compensation programs to provide compensation for those with severe adverse effects of vaccination. The United States' program is known as the National Childhood Vaccine Injury Act, and the United Kingdom employs the Vaccine Damage Payment.

== Types ==
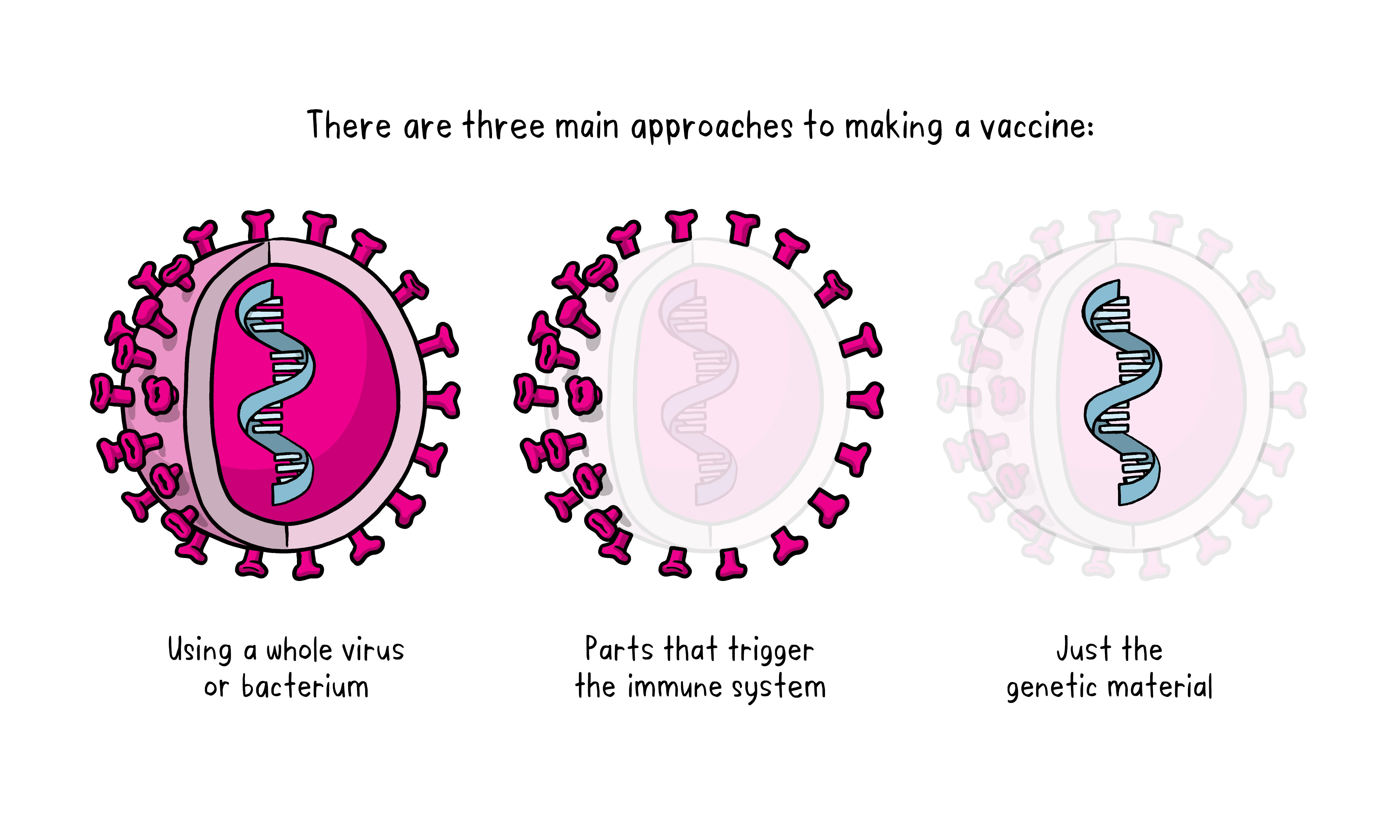

Vaccines typically contain attenuated, inactivated or dead organisms or purified products derived from them. There are several types of vaccines in use. These represent different strategies used to try to reduce the risk of illness while retaining the ability to induce a beneficial immune response.

=== Attenuated ===
Some vaccines contain live, attenuated microorganisms. Many of these are active viruses that have been cultivated under conditions that disable their virulent properties, or that use closely related but less dangerous organisms to produce a broad immune response. Although most attenuated vaccines are viral, some are bacterial in nature. Examples include the viral diseases yellow fever, measles, mumps, and rubella, and the bacterial disease typhoid. The live Mycobacterium tuberculosis vaccine developed by Calmette and Guérin is not made of a contagious strain but contains a virulently modified strain called "BCG" used to elicit an immune response to the vaccine. The live attenuated vaccine containing strain Yersinia pestis EV is used for plague immunization. Attenuated vaccines have some advantages and disadvantages. Attenuated, or live, weakened, vaccines typically provoke more durable immunological responses. Attenuated vaccines also elicit a cellular and humoral response. However, they may not be safe for use in immunocompromised individuals, and on rare occasions mutate to a virulent form and cause disease.

=== Inactivated ===
Some vaccines contain microorganisms that have been killed or inactivated by physical or chemical means. Examples include IPV (polio vaccine), hepatitis A vaccine, rabies vaccine and most influenza vaccines.

Avian flu vaccine development by reverse genetics techniques

=== Toxoid ===
Toxoid vaccines are made from inactivated toxic compounds that cause illness rather than the microorganism. Examples of toxoid-based vaccines include tetanus and diphtheria. Not all toxoids are for microorganisms; for example, Crotalus atrox toxoid is used to vaccinate dogs against rattlesnake bites.

=== Subunit ===
Rather than introducing an inactivated or attenuated microorganism to an immune system (which would constitute a "whole-agent" vaccine), a subunit vaccine uses a fragment of it to create an immune response. One example is the subunit vaccine against hepatitis B, which is composed of only the surface proteins of the virus (previously extracted from the blood serum of chronically infected patients but now produced by recombination of the viral genes into yeast). Other examples include the Gardasil virus-like particle human papillomavirus (HPV) vaccine, the hemagglutinin and neuraminidase subunits of the influenza virus, and edible algae vaccines. A subunit vaccine is being used for plague immunization.

=== Conjugate ===
Certain bacteria have a polysaccharide outer coat that is poorly immunogenic. By linking these outer coats to proteins (e.g., toxins), the immune system can be led to recognize the polysaccharide as if it were a protein antigen. This approach is used in the Haemophilus influenzae type B vaccine.

=== Outer membrane vesicle ===
Outer membrane vesicles (OMVs) are naturally immunogenic and can be manipulated to produce potent vaccines. The best known OMV vaccines are those developed for serotype B meningococcal disease.

=== Heterotypic ===
Heterologous vaccines also known as "Jennerian vaccines", are vaccines that are pathogens of other animals that either do not cause disease or cause mild disease in the organism being treated. The classic example is Jenner's use of cowpox to protect against smallpox. A current example is the use of BCG vaccine made from Mycobacterium bovis to protect against tuberculosis.

=== Genetic vaccine ===
Genetic vaccines are based on the principle of uptake of a nucleic acid into cells, whereupon a protein is produced according to the nucleic acid template. This protein is usually the immunodominant antigen of the pathogen or a surface protein that enables the formation of neutralizing antibodies. The subgroup of genetic vaccines encompass viral vector vaccines, RNA vaccines and DNA vaccines.

==== Viral vector ====
Viral vector vaccines use a safe virus to insert pathogen genes in the body to produce specific antigens, such as surface proteins, to stimulate an immune response. Viruses being researched for use as viral vectors include adenovirus, vaccinia virus, and VSV.

==== RNA ====
An mRNA vaccine (or RNA vaccine) is a novel type of vaccine which is composed of the nucleic acid RNA, packaged within a vector such as lipid nanoparticles. Among the COVID-19 vaccines are a number of RNA vaccines to combat the COVID-19 pandemic and some have been approved or have received emergency use authorization in some countries. For example, the Pfizer-BioNTech vaccine and Moderna mRNA vaccine are approved for use in adults and children in the US.

==== DNA ====
A DNA vaccine uses a DNA plasmid (pDNA)) that encodes for an antigenic protein originating from the pathogen upon which the vaccine will be targeted. pDNA is inexpensive, stable, and relatively safe, making it an excellent option for vaccine delivery.

This approach offers a number of potential advantages over traditional approaches, including the stimulation of both B- and T-cell responses, improved vaccine stability, the absence of any infectious agent and the relative ease of large-scale manufacture.

=== Experimental ===
Many innovative vaccines are also in development and use.

- Dendritic cell vaccines combine dendritic cells with antigens to present the antigens to the body's white blood cells, thus stimulating an immune reaction. These vaccines have shown some positive preliminary results for treating brain tumors and are also tested in melanoma.
- Recombinant vector – by combining the physiology of one microorganism and the DNA of another, immunity can be created against diseases that have complex infection processes. An example is the RVSV-ZEBOV vaccine licensed to Merck that is being used in 2018 to combat ebola in Congo.
- T-cell receptor peptide vaccines are under development for several diseases using models of Valley Fever, stomatitis, and atopic dermatitis. These peptides have been shown to modulate cytokine production and improve cell-mediated immunity.
- Targeting of identified bacterial proteins that are involved in complement inhibition would neutralize the key bacterial virulence mechanism.
- The use of plasmids has been validated in preclinical studies as a protective vaccine strategy for cancer and infectious diseases. However, in human studies, this approach has failed to provide clinically relevant benefit. The overall efficacy of plasmid DNA immunization depends on increasing the plasmid's immunogenicity while also correcting for factors involved in the specific activation of immune effector cells.
- Bacterial vector – Similar in principle to viral vector vaccines, but using bacteria instead.
- Antigen-presenting cell
- Technologies which may allow rapid vaccine deployment in response to a novel pathogen include the use of virus-like particles or protein nanoparticles.
- Inverse vaccines are vaccines that train the immune system to not respond to certain substances.

While most vaccines are created using inactivated or attenuated compounds from microorganisms, synthetic vaccines are composed mainly or wholly of synthetic peptides, carbohydrates, or antigens.

== Valence ==
Vaccines may be monovalent (also called univalent) or multivalent (also called polyvalent). A monovalent vaccine is designed to immunize against a single antigen or single microorganism. A multivalent or polyvalent vaccine is designed to immunize against two or more strains of the same microorganism, or against two or more microorganisms. The valency of a multivalent vaccine may be denoted with a Greek or Latin prefix (e.g., bivalent, trivalent, or tetravalent/quadrivalent). In certain cases, a monovalent vaccine may be preferable for rapidly developing a strong immune response.

=== Interactions ===
When two or more vaccines are mixed in the same formulation, the two vaccines can interfere. This most frequently occurs with live attenuated vaccines, where one of the vaccine components is more robust than the others and suppresses the growth and immune response to the other components.

This phenomenon was noted in the trivalent Sabin polio vaccine, where the relative amount of serotype 2 virus in the vaccine had to be reduced to stop it from interfering with the "take" of the serotype 1 and 3 viruses in the vaccine. To accomplish this, the doses of serotypes 1 and 3 were increased in the vaccine in the early 1960s. It was also noted in a 2001 study to be a problem with dengue vaccines, where the DEN-3 serotype was found to predominate and suppress the response to DEN-1, -2 and -4 serotypes.

== Other contents ==
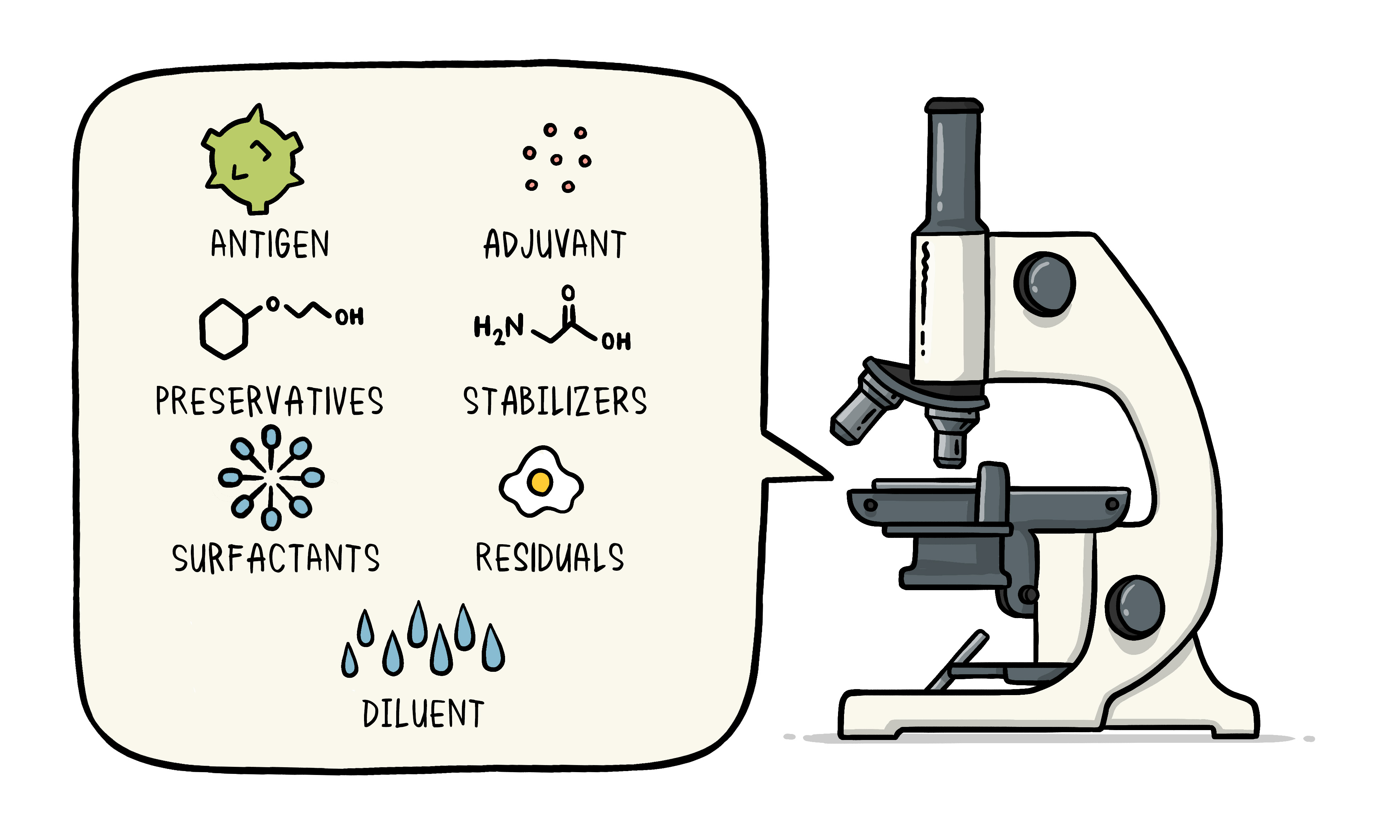
Graphic from the World Health Organization describing the main ingredients typically in vaccines

A vaccine dose contains many ingredients (such as stabilizers, adjuvants, residual inactivating ingredients, residual cell culture materials, residual antibiotics and preservatives) very little of which is the active ingredient, the immunogen. A single dose may have merely nanograms of virus particles, or micrograms of bacterial polysaccharides. A vaccine injection, oral drops or nasal spray is mostly water. Other ingredients are added to boost the immune response, to ensure safety or help with storage, and a tiny amount of material is left-over from the manufacturing process. Very rarely, these materials can cause an allergic reaction in people who are very sensitive to them.

=== Adjuvants ===
Vaccines typically contain one or more adjuvants, used to boost the immune response. Tetanus toxoid, for instance, is usually adsorbed onto alum. This presents the antigen in such a way as to produce a greater action than the simple aqueous tetanus toxoid. People who have an adverse reaction to adsorbed tetanus toxoid may be given the simple vaccine when the time comes for a booster.

In the preparation for the 1990 Persian Gulf campaign, the whole cell pertussis vaccine was used as an adjuvant for anthrax vaccine. This produces a more rapid immune response than giving only the anthrax vaccine, which is of some benefit if exposure might be imminent.

=== Preservatives ===
Vaccines may also contain preservatives to prevent contamination with bacteria or fungi. Until recent years, the preservative thiomersal (a.k.a. Thimerosal in the US and Japan) was used in many vaccines that did not contain live viruses. As of 2005, the only childhood vaccine in the US that contained thiomersal in greater than trace amounts was the influenza vaccine, which is currently recommended only for children with certain risk factors. Single-dose influenza vaccines supplied in the UK do not list thiomersal in the ingredients. Preservatives may be used at various stages of the production of vaccines, and the most sophisticated methods of measurement might detect traces of them in the finished product, as they may in the environment and population as a whole.

Many vaccines need preservatives to prevent serious adverse effects such as Staphylococcus infection, which in one 1928 incident killed 12 of 21 children inoculated with a diphtheria vaccine that lacked a preservative. Several preservatives are available, including thiomersal, phenoxyethanol, and formaldehyde. Thiomersal is more effective against bacteria, has a better shelf-life, and improves vaccine stability, potency, and safety; however, in the US, the European Union, and a few other affluent countries, it is no longer used as a preservative in childhood vaccines, as a precautionary measure due to its mercury content. Although controversial claims have been made that thiomersal contributes to autism, no convincing scientific evidence supports these claims. Furthermore, a 10–11-year study of 657,461 children found that the MMR vaccine does not cause autism and actually reduced the risk of autism by seven percent.

=== Excipients ===
Beside the active vaccine itself, the following excipients and residual manufacturing compounds are present or may be present in vaccine preparations:

- Aluminum salts or gels are added as adjuvants. Adjuvants are added to promote an earlier, more potent response, and more persistent immune response to the vaccine; they allow for a lower vaccine dosage.
- Antibiotics are added to some vaccines to prevent the growth of bacteria during production and storage of the vaccine.
- Egg protein is present in the influenza vaccine and yellow fever vaccine as they are prepared using chicken eggs. Other proteins may be present.
- Formaldehyde is used to inactivate bacterial products for toxoid vaccines. Formaldehyde is also used to inactivate unwanted viruses and kill bacteria that might contaminate the vaccine during production.
- Monosodium glutamate (MSG) and 2-phenoxyethanol are used as stabilizers in a few vaccines to help the vaccine remain unchanged when the vaccine is exposed to heat, light, acidity, or humidity.
- Thiomersal is a mercury-containing antimicrobial that is added to vials of vaccines that contain more than one dose to prevent contamination and growth of potentially harmful bacteria. Due to the controversy surrounding thiomersal, it has been removed from most vaccines except multi-use influenza, where it was reduced to levels so that a single dose contained less than a microgram of mercury, a level similar to eating ten grams of canned tuna.

== Nomenclature ==
Various fairly standardized abbreviations for vaccine names have developed, although the standardization is by no means centralized or global. For example, the vaccine names used in the United States have well-established abbreviations that are also widely known and used elsewhere. An extensive list of them provided in a sortable table and freely accessible is available at a US Centers for Disease Control and Prevention web page. The page explains that "The abbreviations [in] this table (Column 3) were standardized jointly by staff of the Centers for Disease Control and Prevention, ACIP Work Groups, the editor of the Morbidity and Mortality Weekly Report (MMWR), the editor of Epidemiology and Prevention of Vaccine-Preventable Diseases (the Pink Book), ACIP members, and liaison organizations to the ACIP."

Some examples are "DTaP" for diphtheria and tetanus toxoids and acellular pertussis vaccine, "DT" for diphtheria and tetanus toxoids, and "Td" for tetanus and diphtheria toxoids. At its page on tetanus vaccination, the CDC further explains that "Upper-case letters in these abbreviations denote full-strength doses of diphtheria (D) and tetanus (T) toxoids and pertussis (P) vaccine. Lower-case "d" and "p" denote reduced doses of diphtheria and pertussis used in the adolescent/adult-formulations. The 'a' in DTaP and Tdap stands for 'acellular', meaning that the pertussis component contains only a part of the pertussis organism."

Another list of established vaccine abbreviations is at the CDC's page called "Vaccine Acronyms and Abbreviations", with abbreviations used on U.S. immunization records. The United States Adopted Name system has some conventions for the word order of vaccine names, placing head nouns first and adjectives postpositively. This is why the USAN for "OPV" is "poliovirus vaccine live oral" rather than "oral poliovirus vaccine".

== Licensing ==
A vaccine licensure occurs after the successful conclusion of the development cycle and further the clinical trials and other programs involved through Phases I–III demonstrating safety, immunoactivity, immunogenetic safety at a given specific dose, proven effectiveness in preventing infection for target populations, and enduring preventive effect (time endurance or need for revaccination must be estimated). Because preventive vaccines are predominantly evaluated in healthy population cohorts and distributed among the general population, a high standard of safety is required. As part of a multinational licensing of a vaccine, the World Health Organization Expert Committee on Biological Standardization developed guidelines of international standards for manufacturing and quality control of vaccines, a process intended as a platform for national regulatory agencies to apply for their own licensing process. Vaccine manufacturers do not receive licensing until a complete clinical cycle of development and trials proves the vaccine is safe and has long-term effectiveness, following scientific review by a multinational or national regulatory organization, such as the European Medicines Agency (EMA) or the US Food and Drug Administration (FDA).

Upon developing countries adopting WHO guidelines for vaccine development and licensure, each country has its own responsibility to issue a national licensure, and to manage, deploy, and monitor the vaccine throughout its use in each nation. Building trust and acceptance of a licensed vaccine among the public is a task of communication by governments and healthcare personnel to ensure a vaccination campaign proceeds smoothly, saves lives, and enables economic recovery. When a vaccine is licensed, it will initially be in limited supply due to variable manufacturing, distribution, and logistical factors, requiring an allocation plan for the limited supply and which population segments should be prioritized to first receive the vaccine.

=== World Health Organization ===
Vaccines developed for multinational distribution via the United Nations Children's Fund (UNICEF) require pre-qualification by the WHO to ensure international standards of quality, safety, immunogenicity, and efficacy for adoption by numerous countries.

The process requires manufacturing consistency at WHO-contracted laboratories following Good Manufacturing Practice (GMP). When UN agencies are involved in vaccine licensure, individual nations collaborate by 1) issuing marketing authorization and a national license for the vaccine, its manufacturers, and distribution partners; and 2) conducting postmarketing surveillance, including records for adverse events after the vaccination program. The WHO works with national agencies to monitor inspections of manufacturing facilities and distributors for compliance with GMP and regulatory oversight.

Some countries choose to buy vaccines licensed by reputable national organizations, such as EMA, FDA, or national agencies in other affluent countries, but such purchases typically are more expensive and may not have distribution resources suitable to local conditions in developing countries.

=== European Union ===
In the European Union (EU), vaccines for pandemic pathogens, such as seasonal influenza, are licensed EU-wide where all the member states comply ("centralized"), are licensed for only some member states ("decentralized"), or are licensed on an individual national level. Generally, all EU states follow regulatory guidance and clinical programs defined by the European Committee for Medicinal Products for Human Use (CHMP), a scientific panel of the European Medicines Agency (EMA) responsible for vaccine licensure. The CHMP is supported by several expert groups who assess and monitor the progress of a vaccine before and after licensure and distribution.

=== United States ===
Under the FDA, the process of establishing evidence for vaccine clinical safety and efficacy is the same as for the approval process for prescription drugs. If successful through the stages of clinical development, the vaccine licensing process is followed by a Biologics License Application which must provide a scientific review team (from diverse disciplines, such as physicians, statisticians, microbiologists, chemists) and comprehensive documentation for the vaccine candidate having efficacy and safety throughout its development. Also during this stage, the proposed manufacturing facility is examined by expert reviewers for GMP compliance, and the label must have a compliant description to enable health care providers' definition of vaccine-specific use, including its possible risks, to communicate and deliver the vaccine to the public. After licensure, monitoring of the vaccine and its production, including periodic inspections for GMP compliance, continue as long as the manufacturer retains its license, which may include additional submissions to the FDA of tests for potency, safety, and purity for each vaccine manufacturing step.

=== India ===
In India, the Drugs Controller General, the head of department of the Central Drugs Standard Control Organization, India's national regulatory body for cosmetics, pharmaceuticals and medical devices, is responsible for the approval of licences for specified categories of drugs such as vaccines and other medicinal items, such as blood or blood products, IV fluids, and sera.

=== Postmarketing surveillance ===
Until a vaccine is in use amongst the general population, all potential adverse events from the vaccine may not be known, requiring manufacturers to conduct Phase IV studies for postmarketing surveillance of the vaccine while it is used widely in the public. The WHO works with UN member states to implement post-licensing surveillance. The FDA relies on a Vaccine Adverse Event Reporting System to monitor safety concerns about a vaccine throughout its use in the American public.

== Scheduling ==

In order to provide the best protection, children are recommended to receive vaccinations as soon as their immune systems are sufficiently developed to respond to particular vaccines, with additional "booster" shots often required to achieve "full immunity". This has led to the development of complex vaccination schedules. Global recommendations of vaccination schedule are issued by Strategic Advisory Group of Experts and will be further translated by advisory committee at the country level with considering of local factors such as disease epidemiology, acceptability of vaccination, equity in local populations, and programmatic and financial constraint. In the United States, the Advisory Committee on Immunization Practices, which recommends schedule additions for the Centers for Disease Control and Prevention, recommends routine vaccination of children against hepatitis A, hepatitis B, polio, mumps, measles, rubella, diphtheria, pertussis, tetanus, HiB, chickenpox, rotavirus, influenza, meningococcal disease and pneumonia.

The large number of vaccines and boosters recommended (up to 24 injections by age two) has led to problems with achieving full compliance. To combat declining compliance rates, various notification systems have been instituted and many combination injections are now marketed (e.g., Pentavalent vaccine and MMRV vaccine), which protect against multiple diseases.

Besides recommendations for infant vaccinations and boosters, many specific vaccines are recommended for other ages or for repeated injections throughout life – most commonly for measles, tetanus, influenza, and pneumonia. Pregnant women are often screened for continued resistance to rubella. As of 2011, the human papillomavirus vaccine was recommended in the US, and, as of 2009, in the UK. Vaccine recommendations for the elderly concentrate on pneumonia and influenza, which are more deadly to that group. In 2006, a vaccine was introduced against shingles, a disease caused by the chickenpox virus, which usually affects the elderly.

Scheduling and dosing of a vaccination may be tailored to the level of immunocompetence of an individual and to optimize population-wide deployment of a vaccine when its supply is limited, e.g. in the setting of a pandemic.

== Economics of development ==
One challenge in vaccine development is economic: Many of the diseases most demanding a vaccine, including HIV, malaria and tuberculosis, exist principally in poor countries. In the United States, financial returns are usually minimal and the financial and other risks are great.

Most vaccine development to date has relied on "push" funding by government, universities and non-profit organizations. Many vaccines have been highly cost effective and beneficial for public health. The number of vaccines actually administered has risen dramatically in recent decades. This increase, particularly in the number of different vaccines administered to children before entry into schools, may be due to government mandates and support, rather than economic incentive.

=== Patents ===
According to the World Health Organization (WHO), the biggest barrier to vaccine production in less developed countries has not been patents, but the substantial financial, infrastructure, and workforce requirements needed for market entry. Vaccines are complex mixtures of biological compounds, and unlike the case for prescription drugs, there are no true generic vaccines. The vaccine produced by a new facility must undergo complete clinical testing for safety and efficacy by the manufacturer. For most vaccines, specific processes in technology are patented. These can be circumvented by alternative manufacturing methods, but this required R&D infrastructure and a suitably skilled workforce. In the case of a few relatively new vaccines, such as the human papillomavirus vaccine, the patents may impose an additional barrier.

When increased production of vaccines was urgently needed during the COVID-19 pandemic in 2021, the World Trade Organization and governments around the world evaluated whether to waive intellectual property rights and patents on COVID-19 vaccines, which would "eliminate all potential barriers to the timely access of affordable COVID-19 medical products, including vaccines and medicines, and scale up the manufacturing and supply of essential medical products".

== Production ==
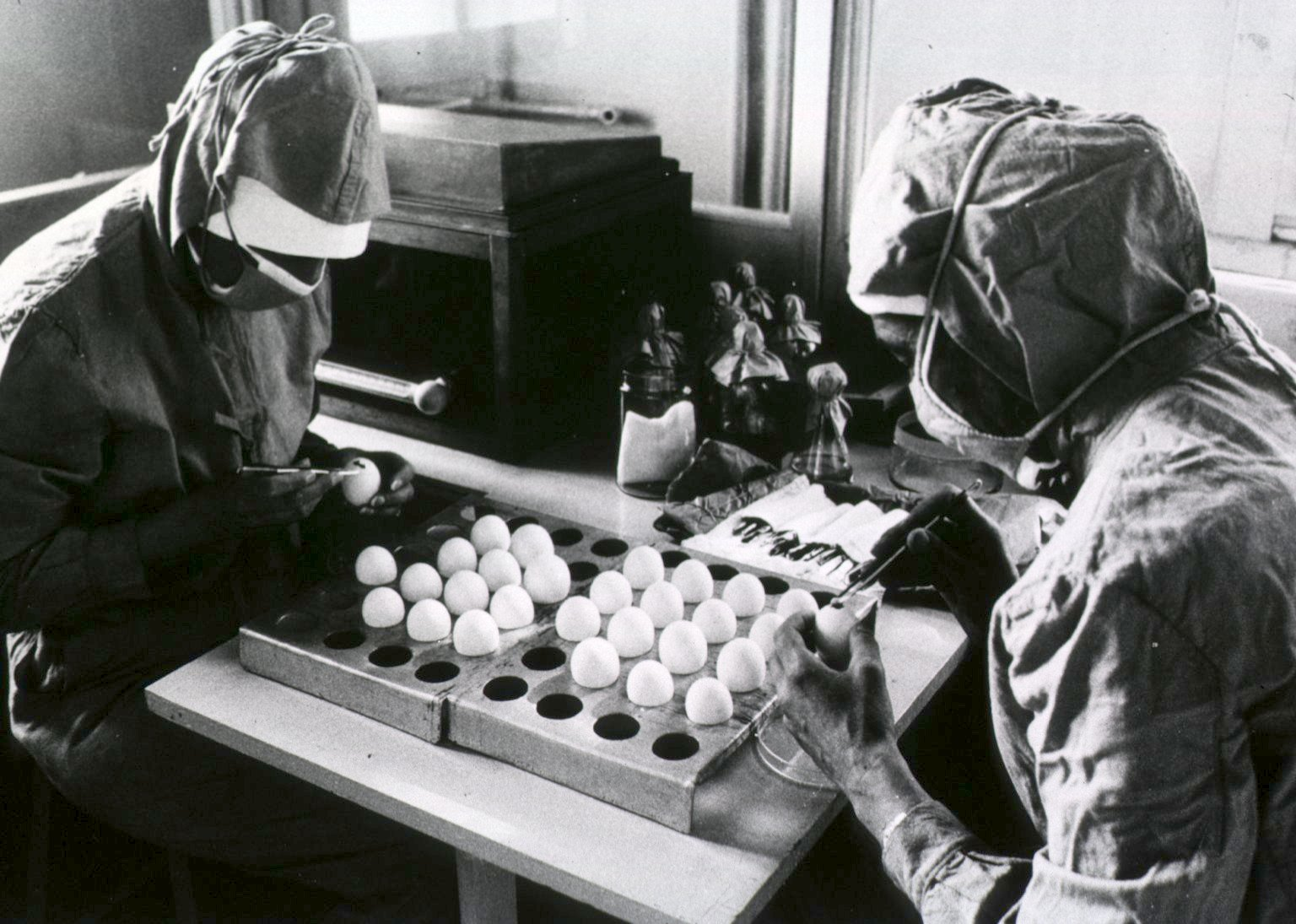
Preparation of measles vaccine at the Tirana (Albania) Institute of Hygiene and Epidemiology.

Vaccine production is fundamentally different from other kinds of manufacturing – including regular pharmaceutical manufacturing – in that vaccines are intended to be administered to millions of people of whom the vast majority are perfectly healthy. This fact drives an extraordinarily rigorous production process with strict compliance requirements that go far beyond what is required of other products.

Depending upon the antigen, it can cost anywhere from US$50 to $500 million to build a vaccine production facility, which requires highly specialized equipment, clean rooms, and containment rooms. There is a global scarcity of personnel with the right combination of skills, expertise, knowledge, competence and personality to staff vaccine production lines. With the notable exceptions of Brazil, China, and India, many developing countries' educational systems are unable to provide enough qualified candidates, and vaccine makers based in such countries must hire expatriate personnel to keep production going.

Vaccine production has several stages. First, the antigen itself is generated. Viruses are grown either on primary cells such as chicken eggs (e.g., for influenza) or on continuous cell lines such as cultured human cells (e.g., for hepatitis A). Bacteria are grown in bioreactors (e.g., Haemophilus influenzae type b). Likewise, a recombinant protein derived from the viruses or bacteria can be generated in yeast, bacteria, or cell cultures.

After the antigen is generated, it is isolated from the cells used to generate it. A virus may need to be inactivated, possibly with no further purification required. Recombinant proteins need many operations involving ultrafiltration and column chromatography. Finally, the vaccine is formulated by adding adjuvant, stabilizers, and preservatives as needed. The adjuvant enhances the immune response to the antigen, stabilizers increase the storage life, and preservatives allow the use of multidose vials. Combination vaccines are harder to develop and produce, because of potential incompatibilities and interactions among the antigens and other ingredients involved.

The final stage in vaccine manufacture before distribution is fill and finish, which is the process of filling vials with vaccines and packaging them for distribution. Although this is a conceptually simple part of the vaccine manufacture process, it is often a bottleneck in the process of distributing and administering vaccines.

Vaccine production techniques are evolving. Cultured mammalian cells are expected to become increasingly important, compared to conventional options such as chicken eggs, due to greater productivity and low incidence of problems with contamination. Recombination technology that produces genetically detoxified vaccines is expected to grow in popularity for the production of bacterial vaccines that use toxoids. Combination vaccines are expected to reduce the quantities of antigens they contain, and thereby decrease undesirable interactions, by using pathogen-associated molecular patterns.

=== Vaccine manufacturers ===
The companies with the highest market share in vaccine production are Merck, Sanofi, GlaxoSmithKline, Pfizer and Novartis, with 70% of vaccine sales concentrated in the EU or US as of 2013. Vaccine manufacturing plants require large capital investments ($50 million up to $300 million) and may take between 4 and 6 years to construct, with the full process of vaccine development taking between 10 and 15 years. Manufacturing in developing countries is playing an increasing role in supplying these countries, specifically with regards to older vaccines and in Brazil, India and China. The manufacturers in India are the most advanced in the developing world and include the Serum Institute of India, one of the largest producers of vaccines by number of doses and an innovator in processes, recently improving efficiency of producing the measles vaccine by 10 to 20-fold, due to switching to a MRC-5 cell culture instead of chicken eggs. China's manufacturing capabilities are focused on supplying their own domestic need, with Sinopharm (CNPGC) alone providing over 85% of the doses for 14 different vaccines in China. Brazil is approaching the point of supplying its own domestic needs using technology transferred from the developed world.

== Delivery systems ==
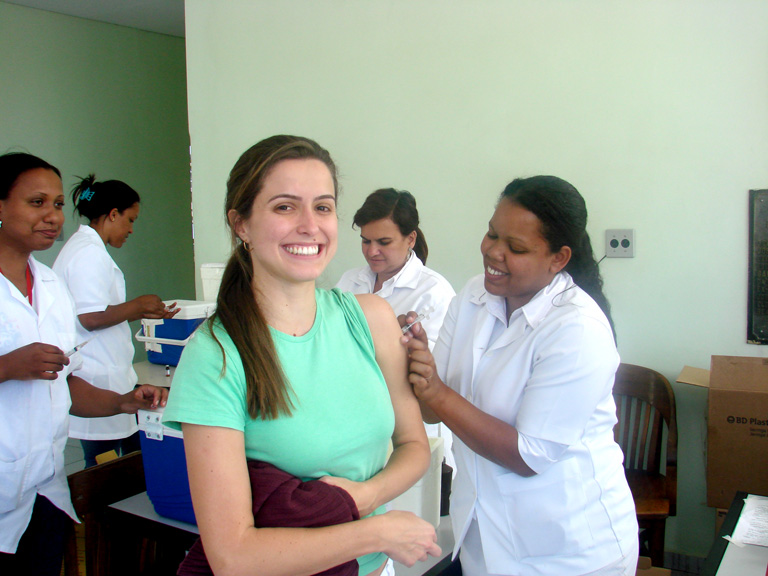
A woman receiving a vaccine by injection

One of the most common methods of delivering vaccines into the human body is injection.

The development of new delivery systems raises the hope of vaccines that are safer and more efficient to deliver and administer. Lines of research include liposomes and ISCOM (immune stimulating complex).

=== Oral vaccines ===
Notable developments in vaccine delivery technologies have included oral vaccines. Early attempts to apply oral vaccines showed varying degrees of promise, beginning early in the 20th century, at a time when the very possibility of an effective oral antibacterial vaccine was controversial. By the 1930s there was increasing interest in the prophylactic value of an oral typhoid fever vaccine for example.

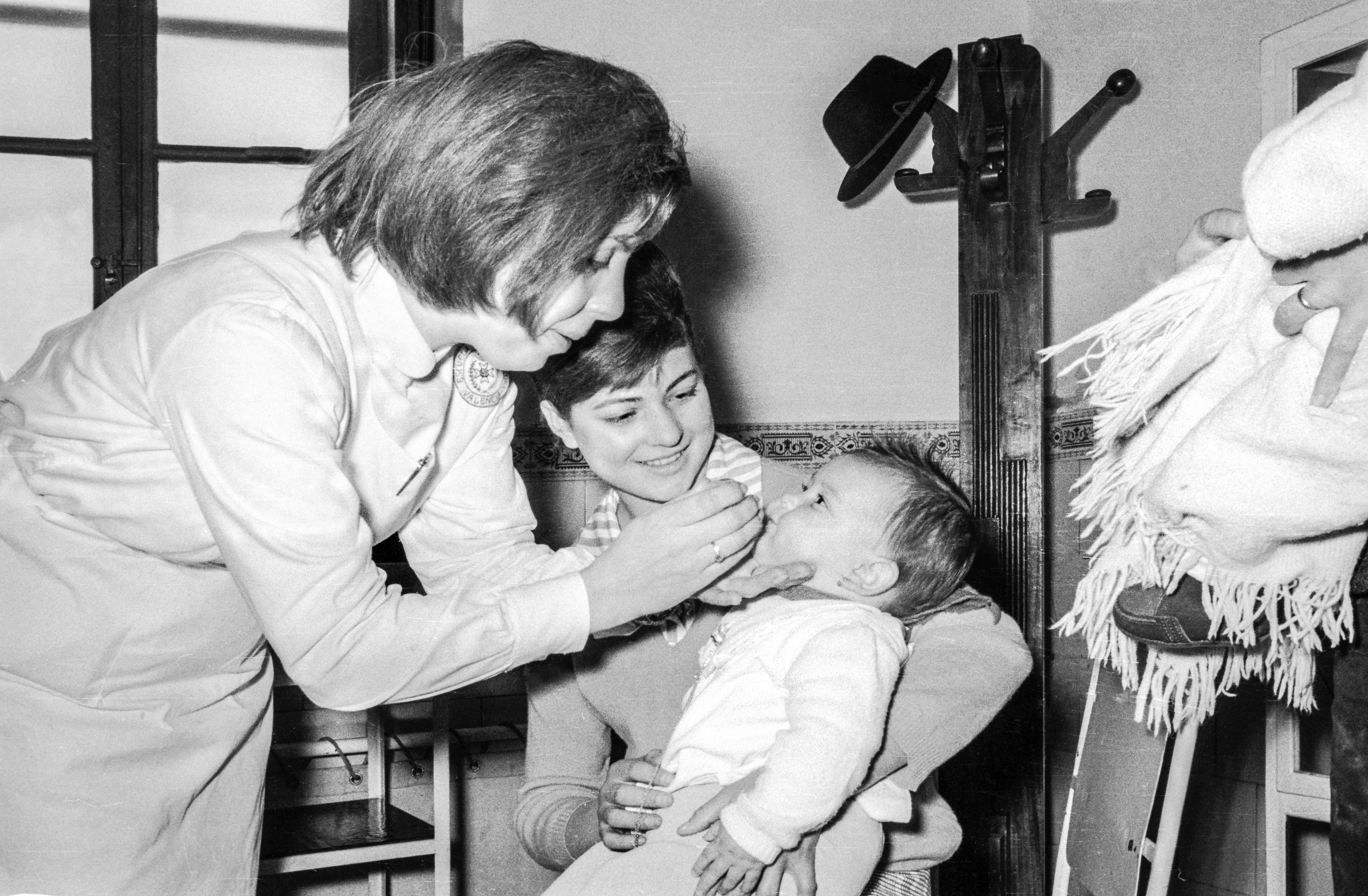
Administration of the oral polio vaccine

An oral polio vaccine turned out to be effective when vaccinations were administered by volunteer staff without formal training; the results also demonstrated increased ease and efficiency of administering the vaccines. Effective oral vaccines have many advantages; for example, there is no risk of blood contamination. Vaccines intended for oral administration need not be liquid, and as solids, they commonly are more stable and less prone to damage or spoilage by freezing in transport and storage. Such stability reduces the need for a "cold chain": the resources required to keep vaccines within a restricted temperature range from the manufacturing stage to the point of administration, which, in turn, may decrease costs of vaccines.

=== Microneedle vaccines ===
A microneedle approach, which is still in stages of development, uses "pointed projections fabricated into arrays that can create vaccine delivery pathways through the skin".

=== Dermal patch vaccines ===
An experimental needle-free vaccine delivery system is undergoing animal testing. A stamp-size patch similar to an adhesive bandage contains about 20,000 microscopic projections per square cm. This dermal administration potentially increases the effectiveness of vaccination, while requiring less vaccine than injection.

== In veterinary medicine ==
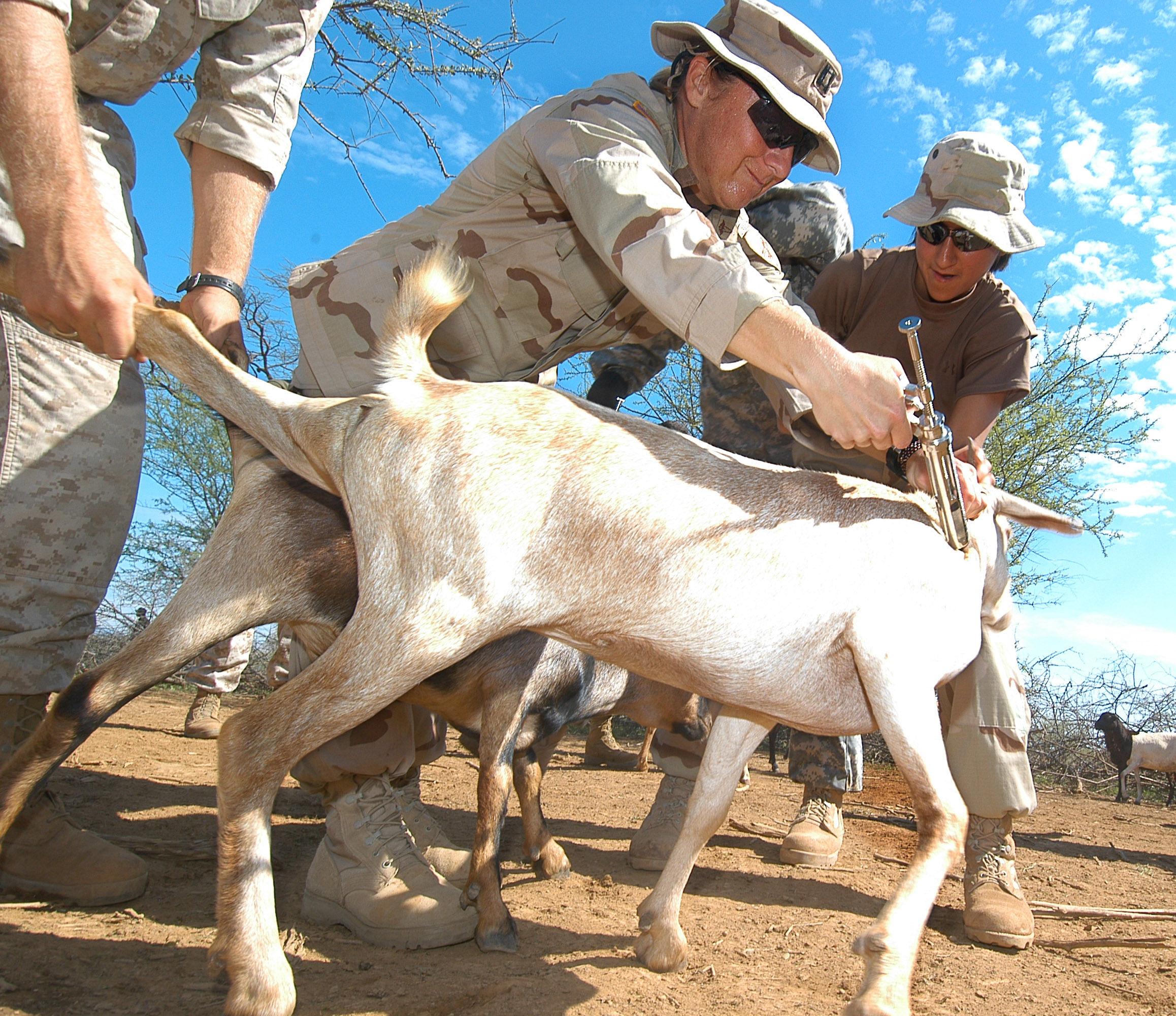
Goat vaccination against sheep pox and pleural pneumonia

Vaccinations of animals are used both to prevent their contracting diseases and to prevent transmission of disease to humans. Both animals kept as pets and animals raised as livestock are routinely vaccinated. In some instances, wild populations may be vaccinated. This is sometimes accomplished with vaccine-laced food spread in a disease-prone area and has been used to attempt to control rabies in raccoons.

Where rabies occurs, rabies vaccination of dogs may be required by law. Other canine vaccines include canine distemper, canine parvovirus, infectious canine hepatitis, adenovirus-2, leptospirosis, Bordetella, canine parainfluenza virus, and Lyme disease, among others.

Cases of veterinary vaccines used in humans have been documented, whether intentional or accidental, with some cases of resultant illness, most notably with brucellosis. However, the reporting of such cases is rare and very little has been studied about the safety and results of such practices. With the advent of aerosol vaccination in veterinary clinics, human exposure to pathogens not naturally carried in humans, such as Bordetella bronchiseptica, has likely increased in recent years. In some cases, most notably rabies, the parallel veterinary vaccine against a pathogen may be as much as orders of magnitude more economical than the human one.

=== DIVA vaccines ===
A common issue with animal vaccination is that it interferes with immunological tests as both infection and vaccination can result in antibodies against an antigen being made. To solve this issue, special marker vaccines are created using pathogen strains carrying at least one epitope less than the equivalent wild microorganism. An accompanying diagnostic test that detects the antibody against that epitope assists in identifying whether the animal has been vaccinated or not. They are also called "DIVA vaccines".

The first marker vaccines and companion diagnostic tests were developed by J. T. van Oirschot and colleagues at the Central Veterinary Institute in Lelystad, The Netherlands. They found that some existing vaccines against pseudorabies (also termed Aujeszky's disease) had deletions in their viral genome (among which was the gE gene). Monoclonal antibodies were produced against that deletion and selected to develop an ELISA that demonstrated antibodies against gE. In addition, novel genetically engineered gE-negative vaccines were constructed. Along the same lines, DIVA vaccines and companion diagnostic tests against bovine herpesvirus 1 infections have been developed.

The DIVA strategy has been applied in various countries to successfully eradicate pseudorabies virus from those countries. Swine populations were intensively vaccinated and monitored by the companion diagnostic test and, subsequently, the infected pigs were removed from the population. Bovine herpesvirus 1 DIVA vaccines are widely used in European BoHV-1 control and eradication programmes.

== History ==
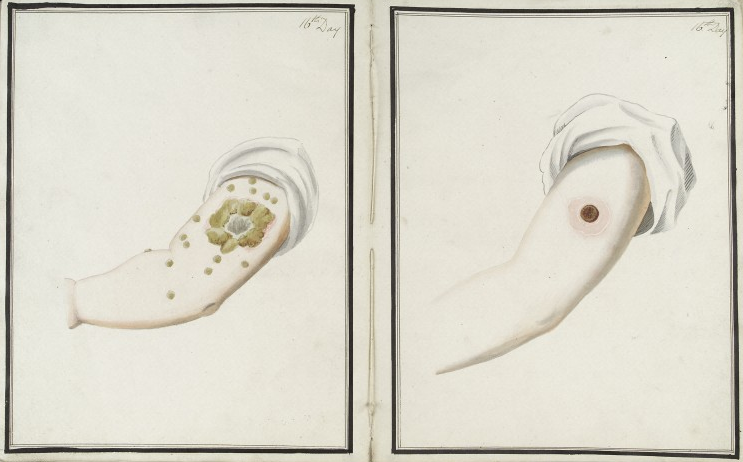
Comparison of smallpox (left) and cowpox inoculations sixteen days after administration (1802)

Prior to the introduction of vaccination with material from cases of cowpox (heterotypic immunisation), smallpox could be prevented by deliberate variolation with smallpox virus. According to historian Joseph Needham, Taoists in China as far back as the 10th century practiced a form of inoculation and passed it down through oral tradition, though Needham's claim has been criticized since the practice was not written about. The Chinese also practiced the oldest documented use of variolation, dating back to the fifteenth century. They implemented a method of "nasal insufflation" administered by blowing powdered smallpox material, usually scabs, up the nostrils. Various insufflation techniques have been recorded throughout the sixteenth and seventeenth centuries within China. Two reports on the Chinese practice of inoculation were received by the Royal Society in London in 1700; one by Martin Lister who received a report by an employee of the East India Company stationed in China and another by Clopton Havers. In France, Voltaire reports that the Chinese have practiced variolation "these hundred years".

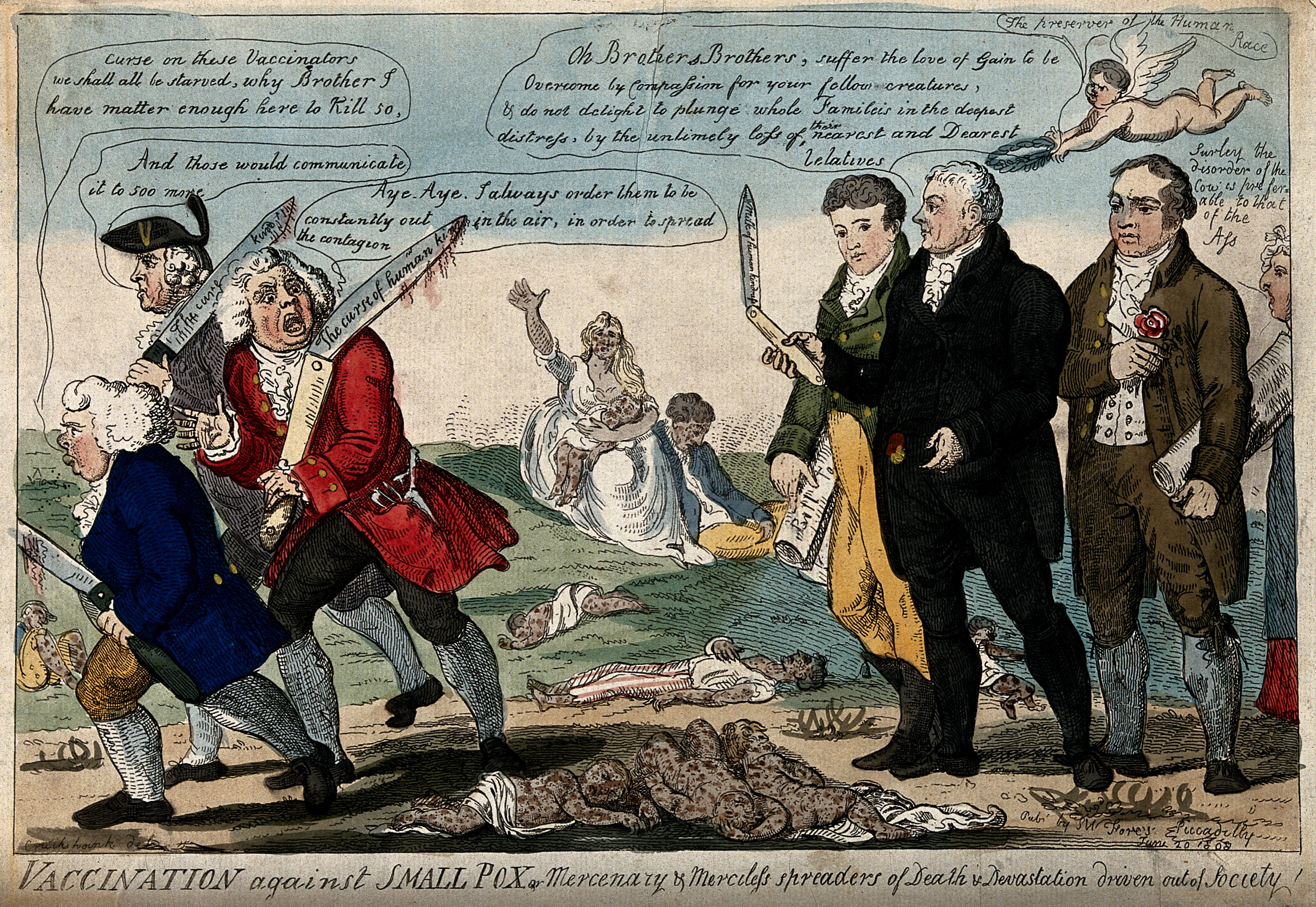
An early 19th-century satire of antivaxxers by Isaac Cruikshank

Mary Wortley Montagu, who had witnessed variolation in Turkey, had her four-year-old daughter variolated in the presence of physicians of the Royal Court in 1721 upon her return to England. Later on that year, Charles Maitland conducted an experimental variolation of six prisoners in Newgate Prison in London. The experiment was a success, and soon variolation was drawing attention from the royal family, who helped promote the procedure. However, in 1783, several days after Prince Octavius of Great Britain was inoculated, he died.

In 1796, the physician Edward Jenner took pus from the hand of a milkmaid with cowpox, scratched it into the arm of an 8-year-old boy, James Phipps, and six weeks later variolated the boy with smallpox, afterwards observing that he did not catch smallpox. Jenner extended his studies and, in 1798, reported that his vaccine was safe in children and adults, and could be transferred from arm-to-arm, which reduced reliance on uncertain supplies from infected cows. In 1804, the Spanish Balmis smallpox vaccination expedition to Spain's colonies Mexico and Philippines used the arm-to-arm transport method to get around the fact the vaccine survived for only 12 days in vitro. They used cowpox. Since vaccination with cowpox was much safer than smallpox inoculation, the latter, though still widely practiced in England, was banned in 1840.

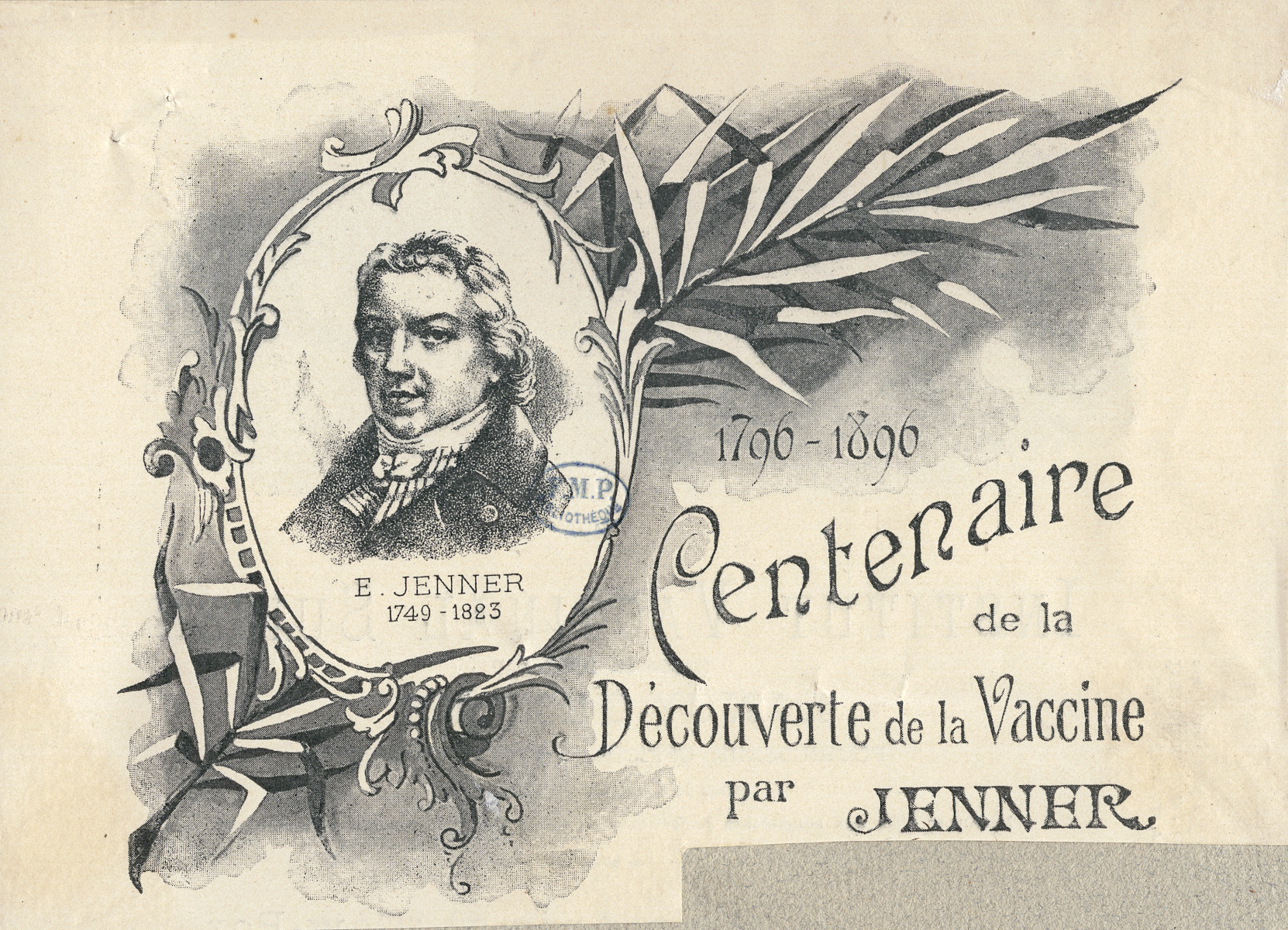
French print in 1896 marking the centenary of Jenner's vaccine

Following on from Jenner's work, the second generation of vaccines was introduced in the 1880s by Louis Pasteur who developed vaccines for chicken cholera and anthrax, and from the late nineteenth century vaccines were considered a matter of national prestige. National vaccination policies were adopted and compulsory vaccination laws were passed. In 1931 Alice Miles Woodruff and Ernest Goodpasture documented that the fowlpox virus could be grown in embryonated chicken egg. Soon scientists began cultivating other viruses in eggs. Eggs were used for virus propagation in the development of a yellow fever vaccine in 1935 and an influenza vaccine in 1945. In 1959 growth media and cell culture replaced eggs as the standard method of virus propagation for vaccines.

Vaccinology flourished in the twentieth century, which saw the introduction of several successful vaccines, including those against diphtheria, measles, mumps, and rubella. Major achievements included the development of the polio vaccine in the 1950s and the eradication of smallpox during the 1960s and 1970s. Maurice Hilleman was the most prolific of the developers of the vaccines in the twentieth century. As vaccines became more common, many people began taking them for granted. However, vaccines remain elusive for many important diseases, including herpes simplex, malaria, gonorrhea, and HIV.

=== Generations of vaccines ===
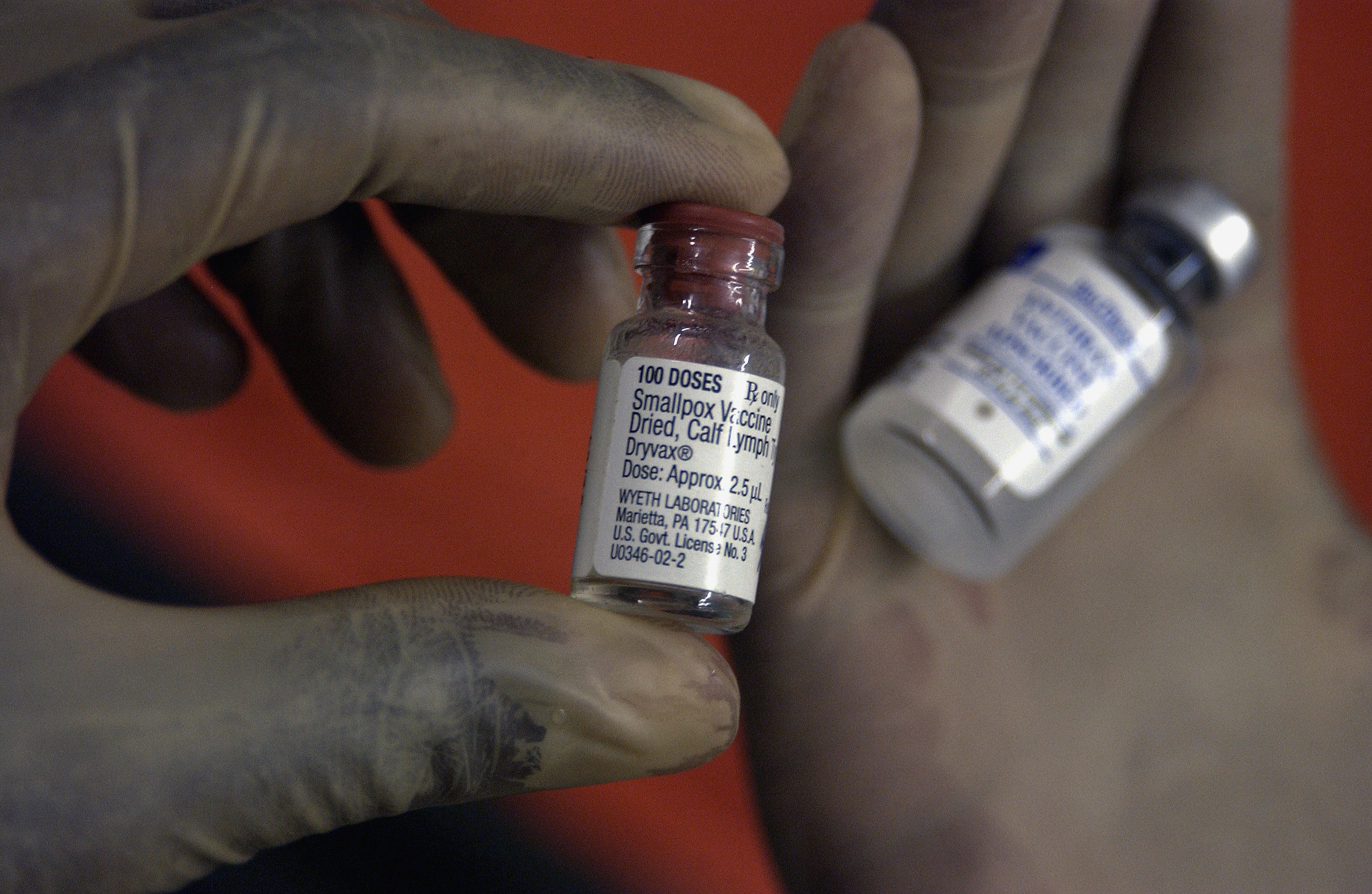
Vials of smallpox and anthrax serum

First generation vaccines are whole-organism vaccines – either live and weakened, or killed forms. Live, attenuated vaccines, such as smallpox and polio vaccines, are able to induce killer T-cell (T_{C} or CTL) responses, helper T-cell (T_{H}) responses and antibody immunity. However, attenuated forms of a pathogen can convert to a dangerous form and may cause disease in immunocompromised vaccine recipients (such as those with AIDS). While killed vaccines do not have this risk, they cannot generate specific killer T-cell responses and may not work at all for some diseases.

Second generation vaccines were developed to reduce the risks from live vaccines. These are subunit vaccines, consisting of specific protein antigens (such as tetanus or diphtheria toxoid) or recombinant protein components (such as the hepatitis B surface antigen). They can generate T_{H} and antibody responses, but not killer T cell responses.

RNA vaccines and DNA vaccines are examples of third generation vaccines. In 2016 a DNA vaccine for the Zika virus began testing at the National Institutes of Health. Separately, Inovio Pharmaceuticals and GeneOne Life Science began tests of a different DNA vaccine against Zika in Miami. Manufacturing the vaccines in volume was unsolved as of 2016. Clinical trials for DNA vaccines to prevent HIV are underway. mRNA vaccines such as BNT162b2 were developed in the year 2020 with the help of Operation Warp Speed and massively deployed to combat the COVID-19 pandemic. In 2021, Katalin Karikó and Drew Weissman received Columbia University's Horwitz Prize for their pioneering research in mRNA vaccine technology.

== Trends ==
Since at least 2013, scientists have been trying to develop synthetic third-generation vaccines by reconstructing the outside structure of a virus; it was hoped that this would help prevent vaccine resistance.

Principles that govern the immune response can now be used in tailor-made vaccines against many noninfectious human diseases, such as cancers and autoimmune disorders. For example, the experimental vaccine CYT006-AngQb has been investigated as a possible treatment for high blood pressure. Factors that affect the trends of vaccine development include progress in translatory medicine, demographics, regulatory science, political, cultural, and social responses.

=== Plants as bioreactors for vaccine production ===
The idea of vaccine production via transgenic plants was identified as early as 2003. Plants such as tobacco, potato, tomato, and banana can have genes inserted that cause them to produce vaccines usable for humans. In 2005, bananas were developed that produce a human vaccine against hepatitis B.

== Vaccine hesitancy ==
After the December 2020 introduction of COVID vaccines in the United States, a partisan gap in death rates developed; The New York Times attributed this gap to differences in vaccine uptake linked to political affiliation. As of March 2024, more than 30 percent of Republicans had not received a COVID-19 vaccine, compared with less than 10 percent of Democrats.

Vaccine hesitancy is a delay in acceptance, or refusal of vaccines despite the availability of vaccine services. The term covers outright refusals to vaccinate, delaying vaccines, accepting vaccines but remaining uncertain about their use, or using certain vaccines but not others. There is an overwhelming scientific consensus that vaccines are generally safe and effective. Vaccine hesitancy often results in disease outbreaks and deaths from vaccine-preventable diseases. The World Health Organization therefore characterized vaccine hesitancy as one of the top ten global health threats in 2019.
