= Smithia gracilis =

Scientific classification
- Kingdom: Plantae
- Clade: Tracheophytes
- Clade: Angiosperms
- Clade: Eudicots
- Clade: Rosids
- Order: Fabales
- Family: Fabaceae
- Subfamily: Faboideae
- Genus: Smithia
- Species: S. gracilis

Binomial name
- Smithia gracilis Benth.

Synonyms
- Damapana gracilis (Benth.) Kuntze

Species of plant

Smithia gracilis is a species of plant in the family Fabaceae. It is endemic to the southern Western Ghats.
