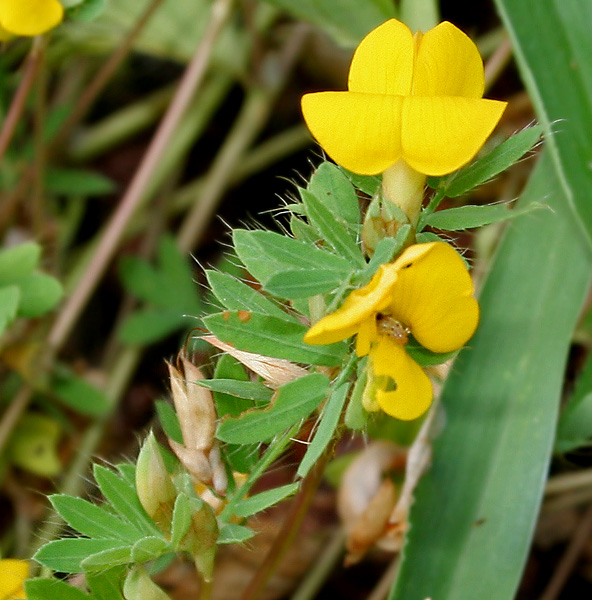
- Smithia conferta in Goa, India

Scientific classification
- Kingdom: Plantae
- Clade: Tracheophytes
- Clade: Angiosperms
- Clade: Eudicots
- Clade: Rosids
- Order: Fabales
- Family: Fabaceae
- Subfamily: Faboideae
- Tribe: Dalbergieae
- Genus: Smithia; Aiton (1789), nom. cons.

Species
- 20; see text

Synonyms
- Damapana Adans. (1763), nom. rej.; Petagnana J.F.Gmel. (1792), nom. rej.

= Smithia =

Genus of legumes

Smithia is a genus of flowering plants in the legume family, Fabaceae. It includes 20 species of herbs or subshrubs native to sub-Saharan Africa, the Indian subcontinent, Indochina, southern China, Japan, Malesia, and northern Australia. The greatest diversity of species is in the Indian subcontinent, with 11 endemic species. Six more are widespread in southern and eastern Asia, and two of these, S. conferta and S. sensitiva, range further to northern Australia. Two species are endemic to sub-Saharan Africa. S. elliotii is native to Madagascar as well as mainland Africa, and S. conferta is also native to Madagascar. Typical habitats include seasonally-dry tropical grassland, wetlands, and streamsides.

The genus belongs to the subfamily Faboideae, and was recently assigned to the informal monophyletic Dalbergia clade of the Dalbergieae.

== Species ==
Smithia comprises the following species:

- Smithia abyssinica (A. Rich.) Verdc.
- Smithia bigemina Dalzell
- Smithia blanda Wall.
- Smithia capitata Dalzell
- Smithia ciliata Royle
- Smithia conferta Sm.
- Smithia elliotii Baker f.
- Smithia erubescens (E.Mey.) Baker f.
- Smithia finetii Gagnep.
- Smithia gracilis Benth.
- Smithia grandis Baker
- Smithia hirsuta Dalzell
- Smithia oligantha Blatt.
- Smithia purpurea Hook.
- Smithia pycnantha Benth. ex Baker f.
- Smithia salsuginea Hance
- Smithia sensitiva Aiton
- Smithia setulosa Dalzell
- Smithia venkobarowii Gamble
- Smithia yehii C.M.Wang, Chih Y.Chang & Y.H.Tseng
