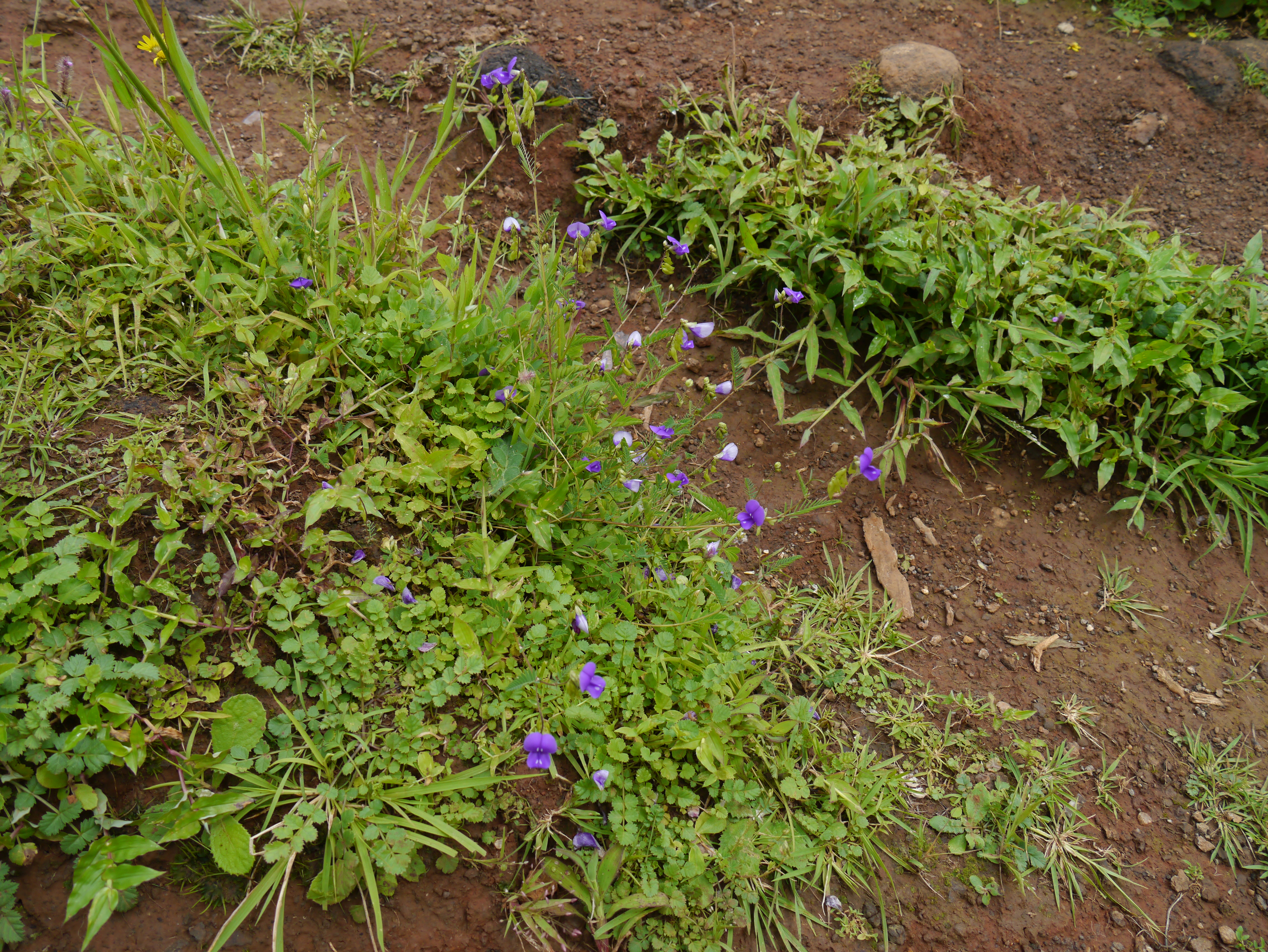

Scientific classification
- Kingdom: Plantae
- Clade: Tracheophytes
- Clade: Angiosperms
- Clade: Eudicots
- Clade: Rosids
- Order: Fabales
- Family: Fabaceae
- Subfamily: Faboideae
- Genus: Smithia
- Species: S. purpurea

Binomial name
- Smithia purpurea Hook., 1847

= Smithia purpurea =

Species

Smithia purpurea is a species of plant in the Fabaceae family.

== Description ==
A small annual herb with an erect stem that grows to a height of 0.5 to 1 ft (0.15 to 0.30 m) and has spreading branches. Leaves are pinnate, leaflets with a bristle at the tip. Flowers purple, about 1 cm across, occur in racemes of 6-12 flowers. The standard petal has two bright white dots.

== Range ==
Western Ghats, India

== Habitat ==
In open moist sunny areas on basaltic outcrops and is abundant on basalt mesas with an elevation of 800 m (2,600 ft) above sea level.

== Ecology ==
In patches on open plateaux, banks of streamlets, road sides and farm bunds of Ghat regions. More frequently encountered near village environs and disturbed places.

== Etymology ==
The genus is named after British botanist and physician Sir James Edward Smith and the specific epithet refers to the purple colour of the flower.
