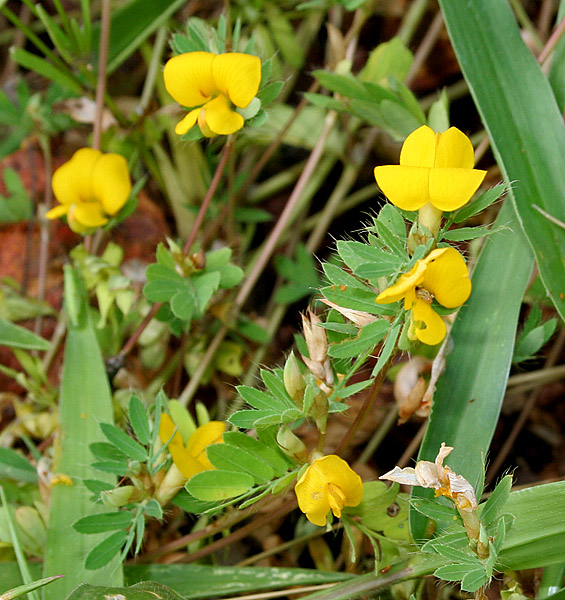

Scientific classification
- Kingdom: Plantae
- Clade: Tracheophytes
- Clade: Angiosperms
- Clade: Eudicots
- Clade: Rosids
- Order: Fabales
- Family: Fabaceae
- Subfamily: Faboideae
- Genus: Smithia
- Species: S. conferta

Binomial name
- Smithia conferta Sm.

Synonyms
- Damapana conferta (Sm.) Kuntze; Smithia geminiflora var. conferta (Sm.) Baker

= Smithia conferta =

Species of flowering plant

Smithia conferta is a species of herbaceous annual flowering plant in the family Fabaceae. Native occurrence ranges from South-east China and Indochina (with the exception of central Indochina) to India and North Australia.

It is widely used in Indian traditional medical practice; its use ranges from a laxative, a tonic, to a cure for "biliousness", rheumatism, and sterility in women.

== Subtaxa ==
Two varieties are accepted:

- Smithia conferta var. conferta
- Smithia conferta var. geminiflora (Roth) T.Cooke
