= Charles Austin Stivers =

American physician and naturalist (~1837–1888)

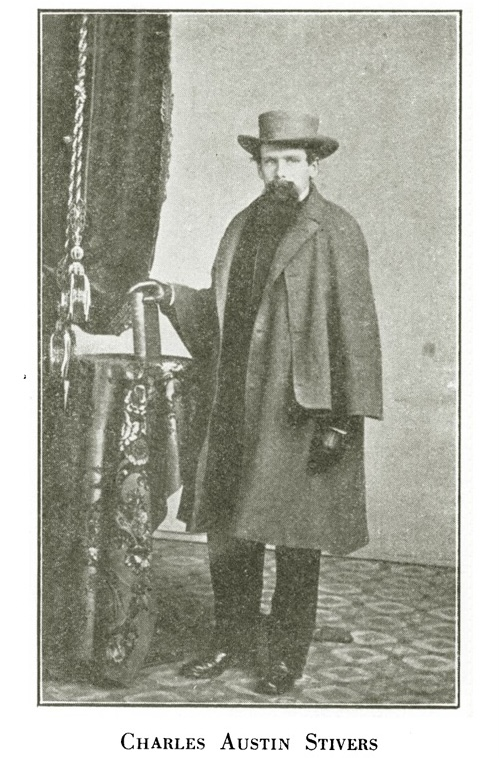
- Born: c. 1837; New York, U.S.
- Died: November 4, 1887; San Francisco, California, U.S.
- Occupations: Physician, naturalist

Charles Austin Stivers (c. 1837 – November 4, 1887) was an American medical doctor and naturalist. He made a collection of annual harlequin lupine on the Mariposa Trail to Yosemite, and the plant was given the binomial name Lupinus stiversii.

== Biography ==
Stivers born in New York State around 1837 to parents born in New York and Connecticut. At the time of the 1850 census he was living with his family in New York City and attending school. The family was in San Francisco by 1861 according to city directories, with Stivers and his father working as clerks at the same business.

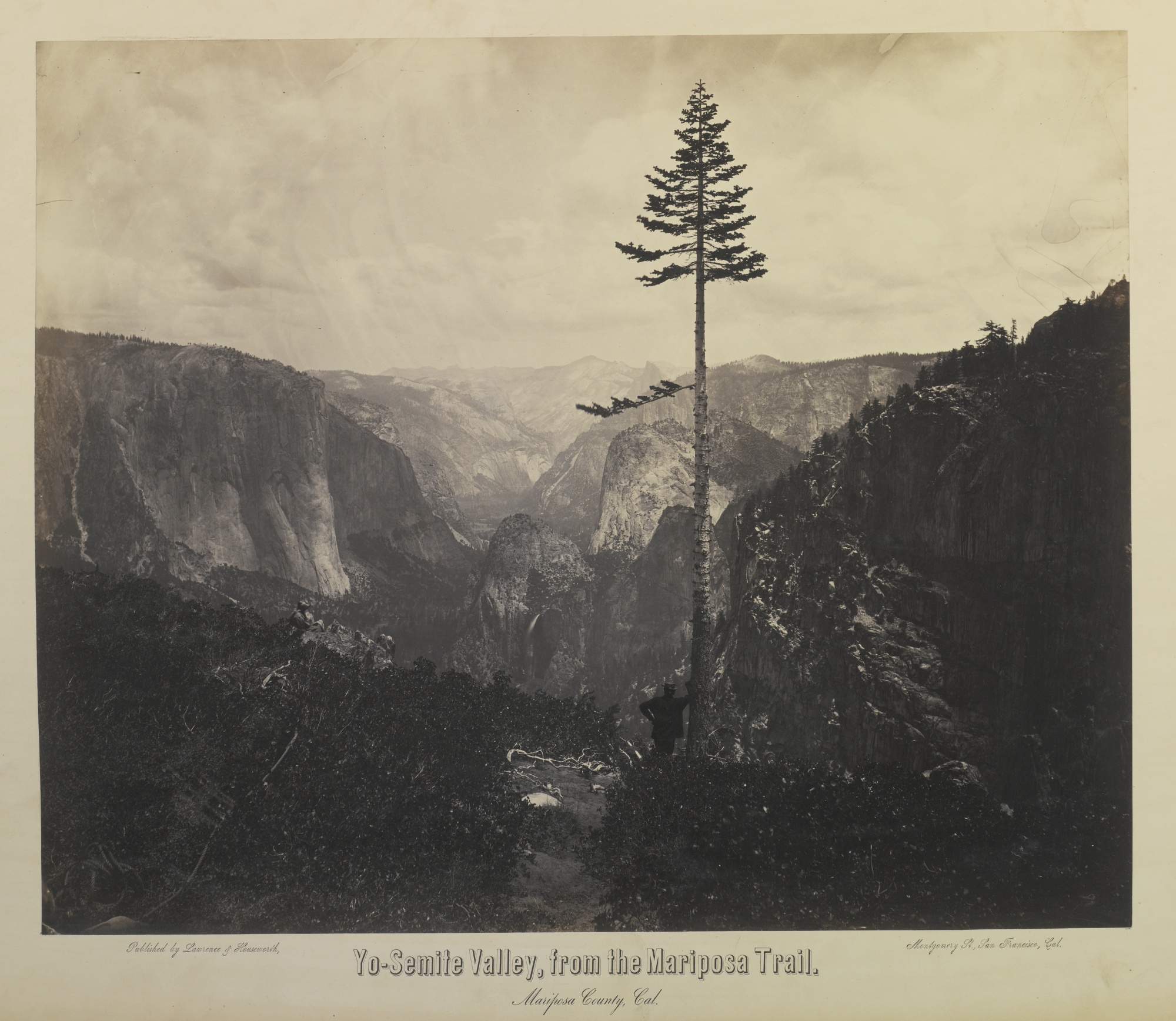
Yo-Semite Valley, from the Mariposa Trail by Charles L Weed, 1864

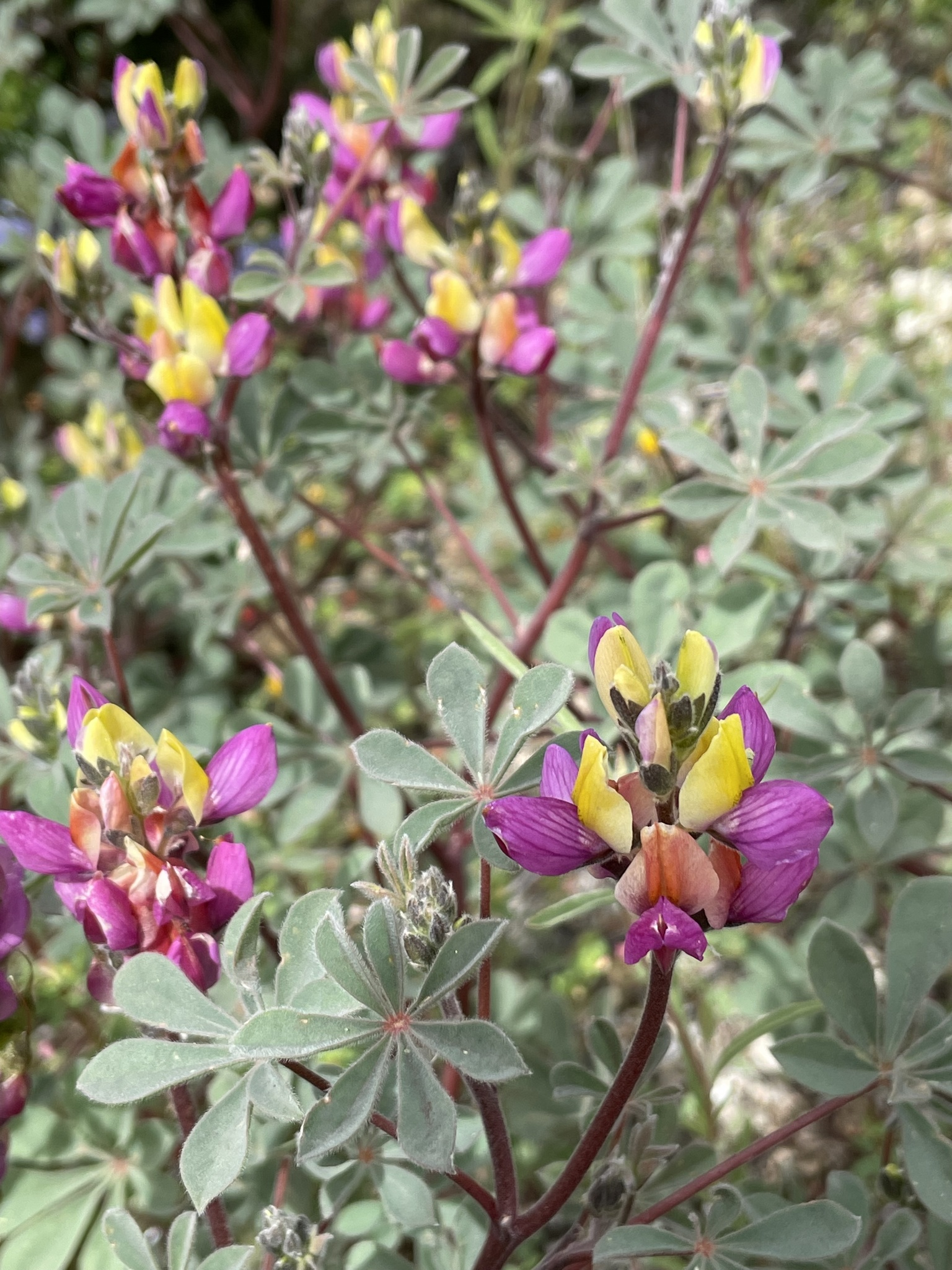
Harlequin lupine at Ventana Wilderness, 2022

According to Willis Linn Jepson, Stivers was in the U.S. Army at the time he first collected harlequin lupine. Jepson wrote, "With yellow banner and rose-pink wings it is a most beautiful species which is never mistaken by even the novice, nor confused with any other member of the genus. It was discovered by Lieutenant Charles Austin Stivers, U. S. A., at Summit Meadow on the Mariposa trail to Yosemite in or about the year 1862, and was named in his honor by Dr. Albert Kellogg (Proc. Cal. Acad. 2:192,—1862). Of Lieutenant Stivers little is known. He held the degree of Doctor of Medicine, and was at one time especially interested in the study of the marine algae. His name is mentioned occasionally in the pages of early proceedings of the Cal. Acad. Sci."

Stivers was part of the first graduating class of what is now the medical school at UCSF. In 1871 he was on the board of the Gillis Gold Mining Co. According to his obituary, "He was Dr. Blach's assistant when the latter was first appointed City Physician and was also the first Police Surgeon of the city. During his realm be established the city receiving hospital." In 1880, Stivers was deputy health officer for the city of San Francisco. In 1880 he published an article about the "hard and ornamental woods of the Pacific Coast." At the time of the 1880 census he lived with his wife, their son, his mother (listed as a "lodger") and a servant in San Francisco. Stivers died suddenly at his San Francisco home in 1888, at age 51.
