= Forisome =

Forisomes are proteins occurring in the sieve tubes of Fabaceae. They are synthesised in companion cells and later moved to sieve elements where they are surrounded by other micro and macro molecules. Forisomes are 10–55 μm long and 1–5 μm wide. They expand and contract anisotropically in response to changes of electric field, pH, or concentration of Ca^{2+} ions. Unlike most other moving proteins, the change is not dependent on ATP. Forisomes function as valves in sieve tubes of the phloem system, by reversibly changing shape between low-volume ordered crystalloid spindles and high-volume disordered spherical conformations. The change from ordered to disordered conformation can increase the protein's volume by three to ninefold, cause loss of birefringence present in the crystalline phase, and induce a 120% radial expansion and 30% longitudinal shrinkage. In Vicia it was shown that forisomes are associated to the endoplasmic reticulum at sieve plates. There are evidences that the forisomes's behavior could depend on Ca^{2+} changes provoked by Ca^{2+}-permeable ion channels, located on the endoplasmic reticulum and plasma membrane of sieve elements. responsible for shape changes.

== Etymology ==
The name forisome, coined by Knoblauch, is derived from the Latin words foris meaning outside and gate and soma meaning body. Together, the names refer to its behavior as an opening body, going from a compact conformation, to an open, dispersed conformation in order to temporarily block the flow of assimilates in the phloem after taking damage from phloem feeding pests and other wounding.

== Functions in the phloem ==
The phloem is often at risk of attack from herbivores and phloem feeding pests that want the sugars it transports. Forisomes act as a defense mechanism in the phloem of leguminous plants and enact sieve element occlusion at damage sites by rapidly changing conformation to enlarge its size and stop the outflow of phloem sap and prevent infection from phytopathogens.

== Activation of forisomes ==
Forisome activation is initially caused by a stress to the phloem with some being mechanical disturbances such as feeding by insects or herbivory, or exposure to environmental factors like radiation or heat shock. Stressors are then sensed by mechanoreceptors and ligand-activated or voltage-gated channels, all signaling for an influx of calcium. Ca^{2+} influx into the sieve element triggers the disordered form of the Forisome. Forisomes do not need to be synthesized upon wounding because they are always present in the sieve element. Forisomes have also been shown to be ATP independent as they are able to undergo conformation change when exposed to Ca^{2+} in vitro. Interactions between the negative residues of forisomes and the positive Ca^{2+} are responsible for the activating the dispersed form. While not practical in biological circumstances forisomes are also able to enter the dispersed conformation when in contact with other cations like Ba^{2+} and Sr^{2+}.

The binding mechanism and site of calcium in forisomes is yet to be identified with theories suggesting that the binding site for Ca^{2+} is multiple proteins long, making it difficult to detect the exact calcium binding motifs. Upon phloem damage repair Ca^{2+} efflux initiates forisomes to reverse to a condensed conformation. Dissolution of forisomes occurs within 3-8 minutes, allowing phloem sap flow to resume. Artificially produced forisomes have been shown to self-assemble into spindle-shaped structures and longitudinally arranged fibrils similar to natural forisomes, even outside of plant cells. Forisomes' ability to self-assemble independent of their surroundings indicates that they are self-organizing proteins that do not require cellular machinery to form.

Oxygen inhibits the return to the compact conformation of forisomes. When wounding occurs within the phloem, an influx of oxygen keeps the forisomes locked in the dispersed conformation. This suggests that an intact sieve element is necessary for the change from dispersed to condensed conformation in forisomes.

== Structure ==
Forisomes are predominantly composed of alpha helical structures and contain negatively and positively charged amino acid residues. Their electrostatic attractive nature likely contributes to the expansive and contractive properties of forisomes. Forisomes function and general structure is well understood, but the precise molecular mechanisms such as how Ca^{2+} is sensed and controls conformations is incompletely understood. Forisomes are able to undergo over 5,000 cycles of expansion and contraction in response to electro-titration. Forisomes remain contracted at pH 4.9-9.0 and expand when at a pH below 4.9 and a pH above 9.0. At pH 12 forisomes lose stability and undergo permanent denaturation.

== Defense against phloem-feeding pests ==
Phloem feeding pests such as aphids, whiteflies, mealybugs, and more have large incentive to puncture the phloem and ingest the sugars present in phloem sap. Sieve element defenses and phloem feeding pests are at a coevolutionary arms race where plants evolve defense mechanisms and phloem feeders evolve penetration mechanisms. One of the defense mechanisms in the sieve elements of the phloem is forisomes. Forisomes' expansion upon phloem damage is able to block phloem feeders from ingesting the sugars in the phloem. Aphids have evolved saliva that contains Ca^{2+} chelating properties allowing them to reverse expanded forisomes by lowering the amount of Ca^{2+} present.

== Research and applications ==
Forisomes ability to be isolated from living tissues and to have its conformation changed with Ca^{2+} in vitro makes them have large research potential in nanotechnological settings. The swelling and contracting nature of forisomes depending only on the presence of Ca^{2+} and other triggers that are independent of ATP has enabled use in biotechnological and microfluidic areas. Prototype valve systems using forisomes in liquid flowing microchannels have demonstrated an ability to reversibly control the flow of liquid based on divalent cations and change in Ph. In microfluidic devices forisomes high hydraulic resistance makes it possible for technical devices to be sealed efficiently.

Forisomes have potential to be unique proteins machines that are different from other protein-based molecular machines that require ATP to supply unidirectional force. Biological motor functions such as actin–myosin and kinesin/dynein–microtubule systems require ATP to create unidirectional force. Different to those motor functions, forisomes create bidirectional force and do not use ATP. This creates new possibilities for microscale and nanoscale machines with concept designs such as microgrippers and synthetic muscle being proposed.
