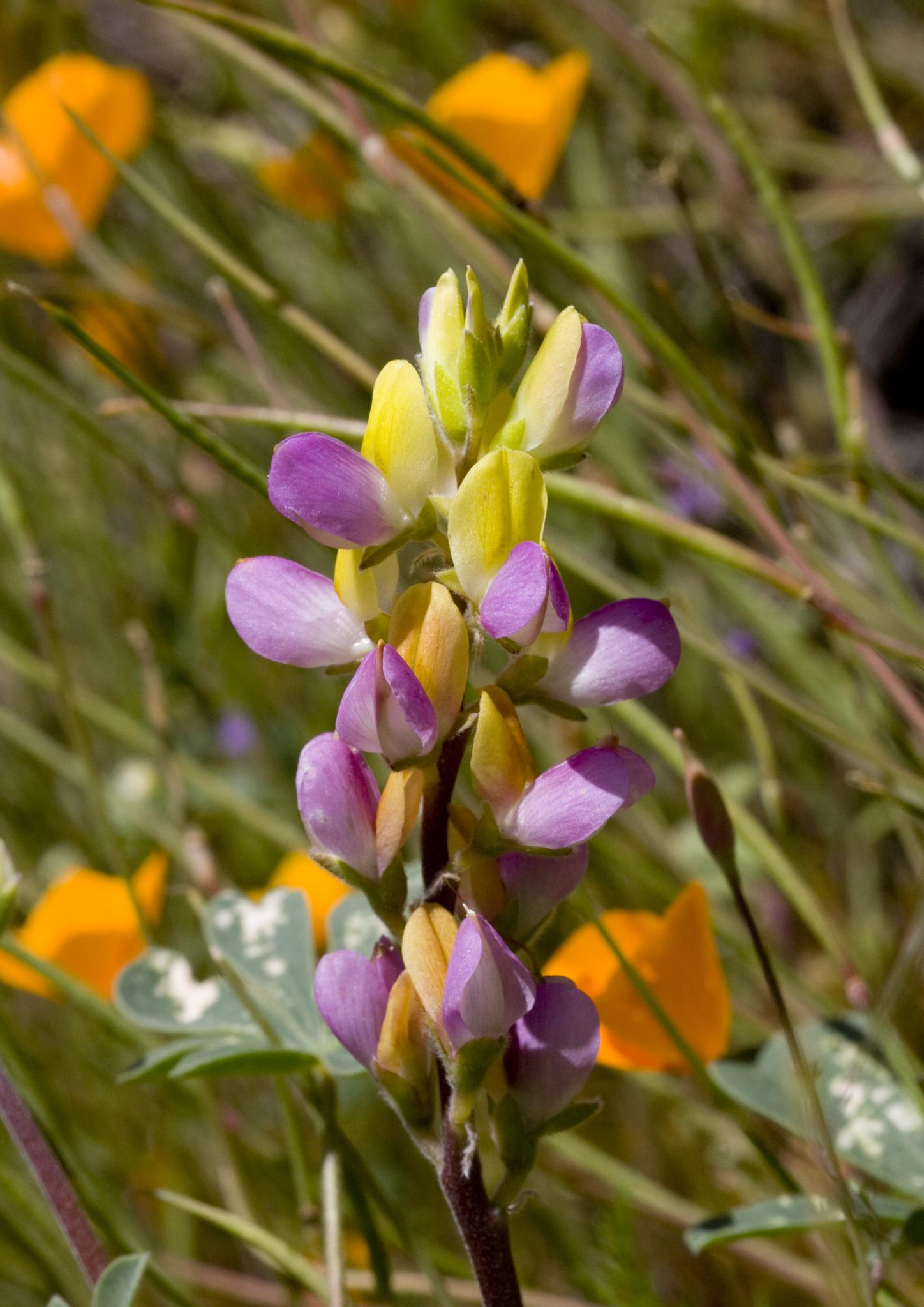

Scientific classification
- Kingdom: Plantae
- Clade: Tracheophytes
- Clade: Angiosperms
- Clade: Eudicots
- Clade: Rosids
- Order: Fabales
- Family: Fabaceae
- Subfamily: Faboideae
- Genus: Lupinus
- Species: L. stiversii

Binomial name
- Lupinus stiversii Kellogg

= Lupinus stiversii =

Species of legume

Lupinus stiversii is a species of lupine known by the common names harlequin annual lupine and harlequin lupine. The plant was named for Charles Austin Stivers, who first collected it in 1862 near Yosemite.

== Distribution ==
Lupinus stiversii is endemic to California, where it has a disjunct distribution in several separate mountain ranges. It is a plant of the Sierra Nevada and its foothills, and populations also occur in the Transverse Ranges above Los Angeles and the Santa Lucia Mountains of Monterey County.

It grows in open, dry habitat, such as chaparral and forest clearings and exposed slopes.

== Description ==
Lupinus stiversii is a hairy annual herb growing 10 to 50 centimeters tall with an erect, branching stem. Each palmate leaf is made up of usually 7 leaflets measuring 2 to 5 centimeters in length.

The inflorescence is a dense array of a few flowers, often just one or two layers. The unique flower is between 1 and 2 centimeters long and is pink with a yellow banner. The fruit is a legume pod around 2 centimeters long containing usually 5 seeds.
