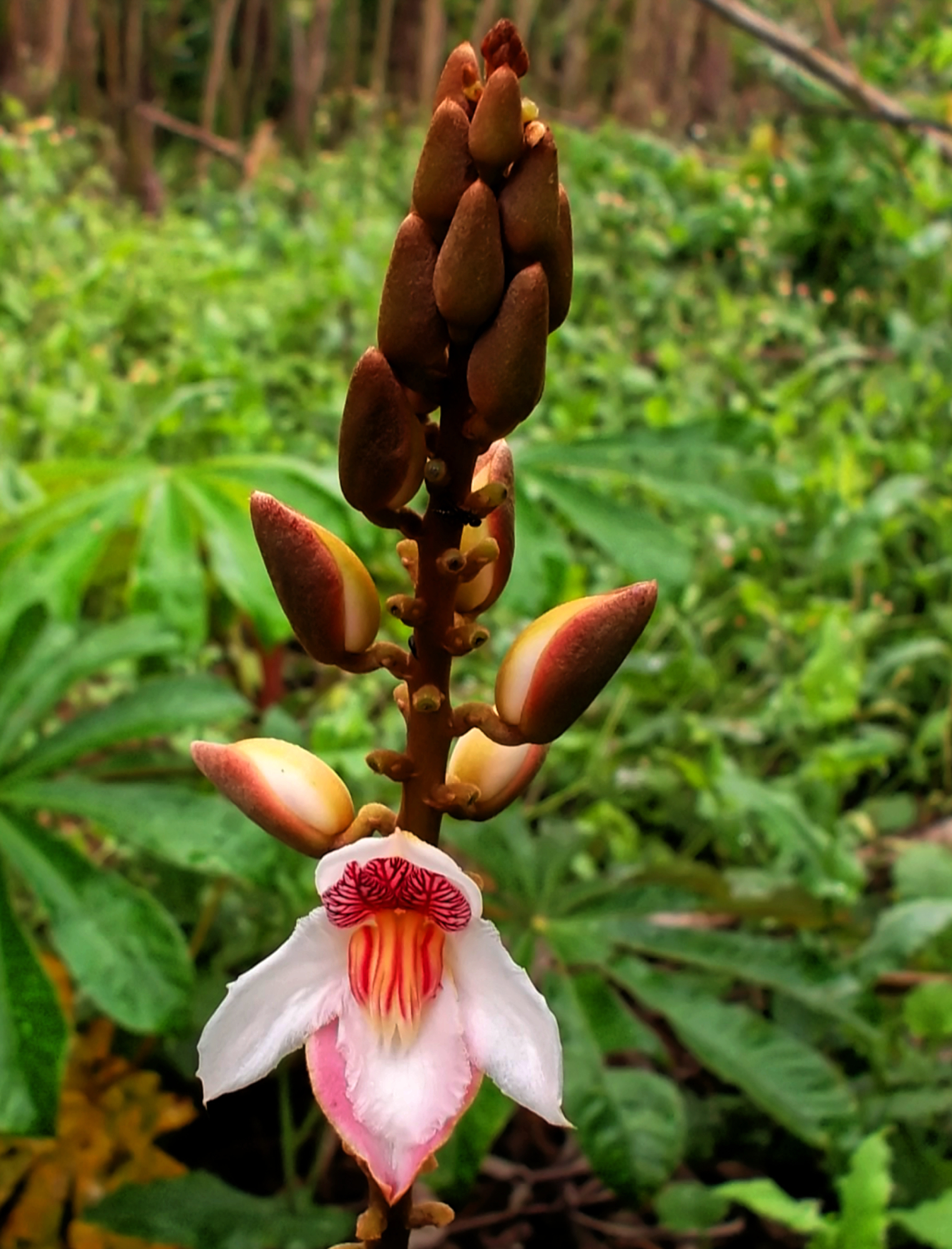
- Duparquetia orchidacea

Scientific classification
- Kingdom: Plantae
- Clade: Embryophytes
- Clade: Tracheophytes
- Clade: Spermatophytes
- Clade: Angiosperms
- Clade: Eudicots
- Clade: Rosids
- Order: Fabales
- Family: Fabaceae
- Subfamily: Duparquetioideae; Legume Phylogeny Working Group
- Genus: Duparquetia; Baill.

Synonyms
- Duparquetiinae H.S.Irwin & Barneby; Oligostemon Benth.

= Duparquetia =

Genus of legumes

Duparquetia is a genus of lianas which are native to tropical west Africa. It is the only genus in the subfamily Duparquetioideae. It is found in humid tropical forests in West and Central Africa. It is a basal member of the Fabaceae, as evidenced by the distinctive structure of its flowers and wood, and phylogenetic studies.

== Species ==
Duparquetia contains three species:

1. Duparquetia alba Jongkind
2. Duparquetia minima Jongkind
3. Duparquetia orchidacea Baill.
