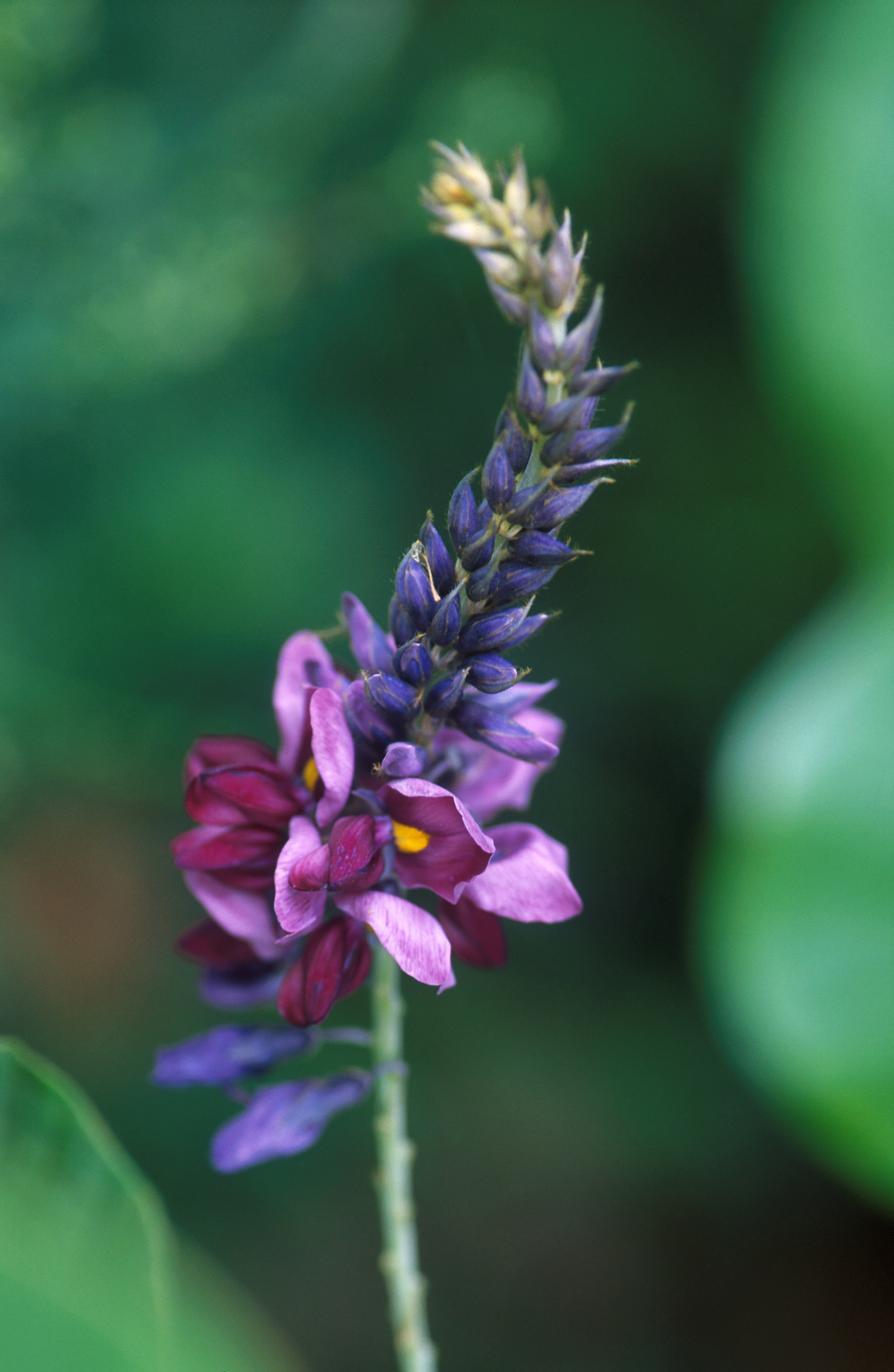
- Kudzu (Pueraria lobata)

Scientific classification
- Kingdom: Plantae
- Clade: Embryophytes
- Clade: Tracheophytes
- Clade: Angiosperms
- Clade: Eudicots
- Clade: Rosids
- Order: Fabales
- Family: Fabaceae; Lindl. (Leguminosae Jussieu, nom. cons.).

Type genus
- Faba (now included in Vicia) Mill.

Subfamilies
- Caesalpinioideae DC.; Cercidoideae LPWG; Detarioideae Burmeist.; Dialioideae LPWG; Duparquetioideae LPWG; Faboideae Rudd (syn. Papilionoideae DC.)

Diversity
- 730 genera and 19,400 species
- Fabaceae distribution map. Legumes are found in four major biomes: tropical forest, temperate, grass, and succulent.

Synonyms
- Caesalpiniaceae R.Br.; Cassiaceae Link; Ceratoniaceae Link; Detariaceae (DC.) Hess; Hedysareae (Hedysaraceae) Agardh; Lathyraceae Burnett; Lotaceae Burnett; Mimosaceae R.Br.; Papilionaceae Giseke; Phaseolaceae Ponce de León & Alvares; Robiniaceae Welw.; Swartziaceae (DC.) Bartl.

= Fabaceae =

Fabaceae Temporal range: Campanian – recent

Family of legume flowering plants

Fabaceae or Leguminosae, commonly known as the legume, pea, or bean family, is a large and agriculturally important family of flowering plants. It includes trees, shrubs, and perennial or annual herbaceous plants, which are easily recognized by their fruit (legume) and their compound, stipulate leaves. The family is widely distributed, and is the third-largest land plant family in number of species, behind only the Orchidaceae and Asteraceae, with about 765 genera and nearly 20,000 known species.

The five largest genera of the family are Astragalus (over 3,000 species), Acacia (over 1,000 species), Indigofera (around 700 species), Crotalaria (around 700 species), and Mimosa (around 400 species), which constitute about a quarter of all legume species. The c. 19,000 known legume species amount to about 7% of flowering plant species. Fabaceae is the most common family found in tropical rainforests and dry forests of the Americas and Africa.

Recent molecular and morphological evidence supports the conclusion that the Fabaceae is a single monophyletic family. This conclusion has been supported not only by the degree of interrelation shown by different groups within the family compared with that found among the Leguminosae and their closest relations, but also by all the recent phylogenetic studies based on DNA sequences. These studies confirm that the Fabaceae are a monophyletic group that is closely related to the families Polygalaceae, Surianaceae and Quillajaceae and that they belong to the order Fabales.

Along with the cereals, some fruits and tropical roots, a number of Leguminosae have been staple human foods for millennia, and their use is closely related to human evolution.

The family Fabaceae includes a number of plants that are common in agriculture, including Glycine max (soybean), Phaseolus (beans), Pisum sativum (pea), Cicer arietinum (chickpeas), Vicia faba (broad bean), Vigna unguiculata (cowpea), Medicago sativa (alfalfa), Arachis hypogaea (peanut), Ceratonia siliqua (carob), Tamarindus indica (tamarind), Trigonella foenum-graecum (fenugreek), and Glycyrrhiza glabra (liquorice). A number of species are also weedy pests in different parts of the world, including Cytisus scoparius (broom), Robinia pseudoacacia (black locust), Ulex europaeus (gorse), Pueraria montana (kudzu), and a number of Lupinus species.

== Etymology ==
The name 'Fabaceae' comes from the defunct genus Faba, now included in Vicia. The term "faba" comes from Latin, and means "bean". Leguminosae is an older name still considered valid, and refers to the fruit of these plants, which are called legumes.

== Description ==
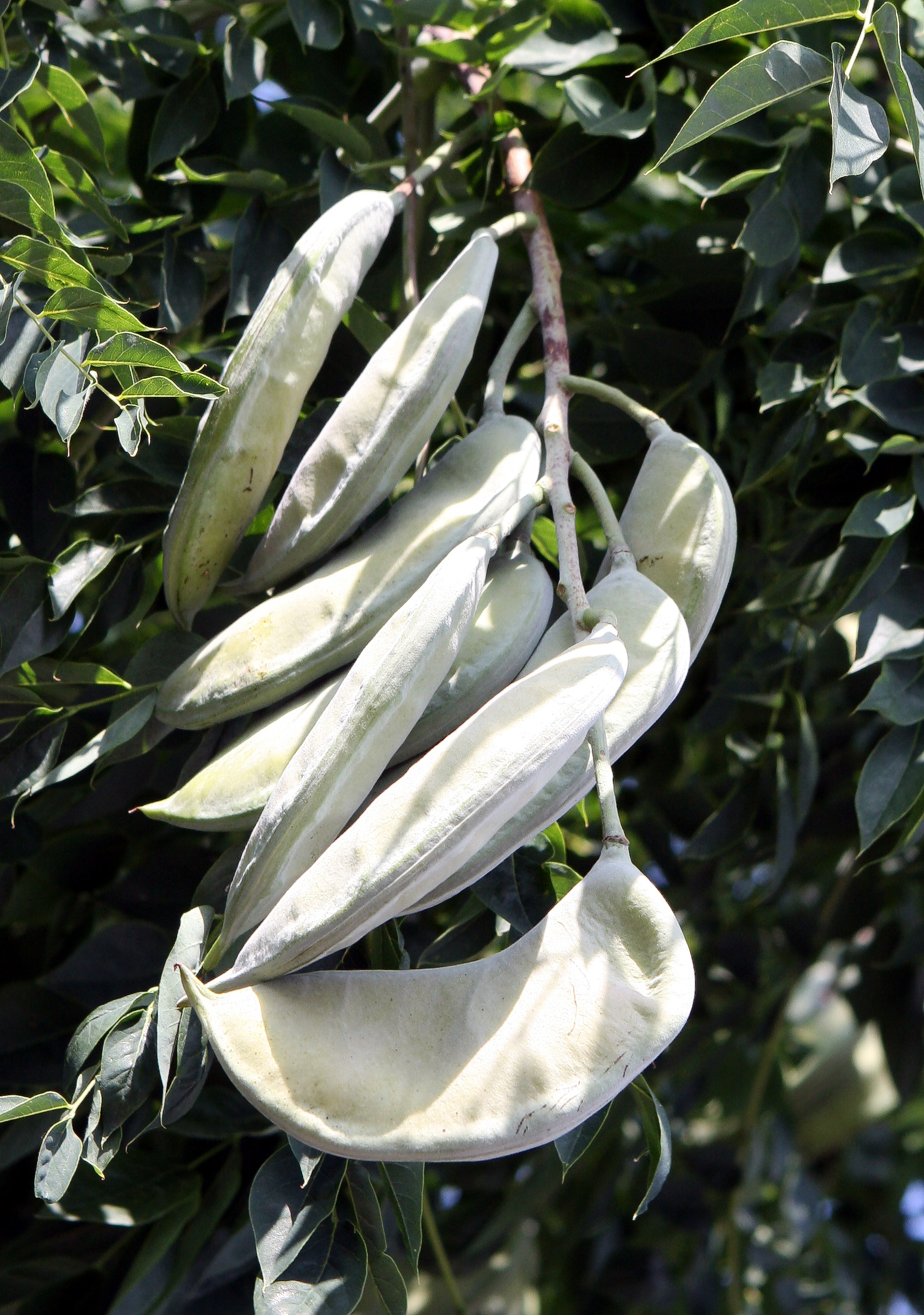
The fruit of Gymnocladus dioicus

Fabaceae range in habit from giant trees (like Koompassia excelsa) to small annual herbs, with the majority being herbaceous perennials. Plants have indeterminate inflorescences, which are sometimes reduced to a single flower. The flowers have a short hypanthium and a single carpel with a short gynophore, and after fertilization produce fruits that are legumes.

=== Growth habit ===
The Fabaceae have a wide variety of growth forms, including trees, shrubs, herbaceous plants, and even vines or lianas. The herbaceous plants can be annuals, biennials, or perennials, without basal or terminal leaf aggregations. Many Legumes have tendrils. They are upright plants, epiphytes, or vines. The latter support themselves by means of shoots that twist around a support or through cauline or foliar tendrils. Plants can be heliophytes, mesophytes, or xerophytes.

=== Leaves ===
The leaves are usually alternate and compound. Most often they are even- or odd-pinnately compound (e.g. Caragana and Robinia respectively), often trifoliate (e.g. Trifolium, Medicago) and rarely palmately compound (e.g. Lupinus), in the Mimosoideae and the Caesalpinioideae commonly bipinnate (e.g. Acacia, Mimosa). They always have stipules, which can be leaf-like (e.g. Pisum), thornlike (e.g. Robinia) or be rather inconspicuous. Leaf margins are entire or, occasionally, serrate. Both the leaves and the leaflets often have wrinkled pulvini to permit nastic movements. In some species, leaflets have evolved into tendrils (e.g. Vicia).

Many species have leaves with structures that attract ants which protect the plant from herbivore insects (a form of mutualism). Extrafloral nectaries are common among the Mimosoideae and the Caesalpinioideae, and are also found in some Faboideae (e.g. Vicia sativa). In some Acacia, the modified hollow stipules are inhabited by ants and are known as domatia.

=== Roots ===
Many Fabaceae host bacteria in their roots within structures called root nodules. These bacteria, known as rhizobia, have the ability to take nitrogen gas (N_{2}) out of the air and convert it to a form of nitrogen that is usable to the host plant (NO_{3}^{−} or NH_{3}). This process is called nitrogen fixation. The legume, acting as a host, and rhizobia, acting as a provider of usable nitrate, form a symbiotic relationship. Members of the Phaseoleae genus Apios form tubers, which can be edible.

=== Flowers ===
A flower of Wisteria sinensis, Faboideae. Two petals have been removed to show stamens and pistil

The flowers often have five generally fused sepals and five free petals. They are generally hermaphroditic and have a short hypanthium, usually cup-shaped. There are normally ten stamens and one elongated superior ovary, with a curved style. They are usually arranged in indeterminate inflorescences. Fabaceae are typically entomophilous plants (i.e. they are pollinated by insects), and the flowers are usually showy to attract pollinators.

In the Caesalpinioideae, the flowers are often zygomorphic, as in Cercis, or nearly symmetrical with five equal petals, as in Bauhinia. The upper petal is the innermost one, unlike in the Faboideae. Some species, like some in the genus Senna, have asymmetric flowers, with one of the lower petals larger than the opposing one, and the style bent to one side. The calyx, corolla, or stamens can be showy in this group.

In the Mimosoideae, the flowers are actinomorphic and arranged in globose inflorescences. The petals are small and the stamens, which can be more than just 10, have long, coloured filaments, which are the showiest part of the flower. All of the flowers in an inflorescence open at once.

In the Faboideae, the flowers are zygomorphic, and have a specialized structure. The upper petal, called the banner or standard, is large and envelops the rest of the petals in bud, often reflexing when the flower blooms. The two adjacent petals, the wings, surround the two bottom petals. The two bottom petals are fused together at the apex (remaining free at the base), forming a boat-like structure called the keel. The stamens are always ten in number, and their filaments can be fused in various configurations, often in a group of nine stamens plus one separate stamen. Various genes in the CYCLOIDEA (CYC)/DICHOTOMA (DICH) family are expressed in the upper (also called dorsal or adaxial) petal; in some species, such as Cadia, these genes are expressed throughout the flower, producing a radially symmetrical flower.

=== Fruit ===
The ovary most typically develops into a legume. A legume is a simple dry fruit that usually dehisces (opens along a seam) on two sides. A common name for this type of fruit is a "pod", although that can also be applied to a few other fruit types. A few species have evolved samarae, loments, follicles, indehiscent legumes, achenes, drupes, and berries from the basic legume fruit.

=== Physiology and biochemistry ===
The Fabaceae are rarely cyanogenic. Where they are, the cyanogenic compounds are derived from tyrosine, phenylalanine or leucine. They frequently contain alkaloids. Proanthocyanidins can be present either as cyanidin or delphinidine or both at the same time. Flavonoids such as kaempferol, quercitin and myricetin are often present. Ellagic acid has never been found in any of the genera or species analysed. Sugars are transported within the plants in the form of sucrose. C3 photosynthesis has been found in a wide variety of genera. The family has also evolved a unique chemistry. Many legumes contain toxic and indigestible substances, antinutrients, which may be removed through various processing methods. Pterocarpans are a class of molecules (derivatives of isoflavonoids) found only in the Fabaceae. Forisome proteins are found in the sieve tubes of Fabaceae; uniquely they are not dependent on ATP.

== Evolution, phylogeny and taxonomy ==
=== Evolution ===
The order Fabales contains around 7.3% of eudicot species and the greatest part of this diversity is contained in just one of the four families that the order contains: Fabaceae. This clade also includes the families Polygalaceae, Surianaceae and Quillajaceae and its origins date back 94 to 89 million years, although it started its diversification 79 to 74 million years ago. The Fabaceae diversified during the Paleogene to become a ubiquitous part of the modern earth's biota, along with many other families belonging to the flowering plants.

The Fabaceae have an abundant and diverse fossil record, especially for the Tertiary period. Fossils of flowers, fruit, leaves, wood and pollen from this period have been found in numerous locations. The earliest fossils that can be definitively assigned to the Fabaceae appeared in the early Palaeocene (approximately 65 million years ago). Representatives of the 3 sub-families traditionally recognised as being members of the Fabaceae – Cesalpinioideae, Papilionoideae and Mimosoideae – as well as members of the large clades within these sub-families – such as the genistoides – have been found in periods later, starting between 55 and 50 million years ago. In fact, a wide variety of taxa representing the main lineages in the Fabaceae have been found in the fossil record dating from the middle to the late Eocene, suggesting that the majority of the modern Fabaceae groups were already present and that a broad diversification occurred during this period. Therefore, the Fabaceae started their diversification approximately 60 million years ago and the most important clades separated 50 million years ago. The age of the main Cesalpinioideae clades have been estimated as between 56 and 34 million years and the basal group of the Mimosoideae as 44 ± 2.6 million years. The division between Mimosoideae and Faboideae is dated as occurring between 59 and 34 million years ago and the basal group of the Faboideae as 58.6 ± 0.2 million years ago. It has been possible to date the divergence of some of the groups within the Faboideae, even though diversification within each genus was relatively recent. For instance, Astragalus separated from the Oxytropis 16 to 12 million years ago. In addition, the separation of the aneuploid species of Neoastragalus started 4 million years ago. Inga, another genus of the Papilionoideae with approximately 350 species, seems to have diverged in the last 2 million years.

It has been suggested, based on fossil and phylogenetic evidence, that legumes originally evolved in arid and/or semi-arid regions along the Tethys seaway during the Palaeogene Period. However, others contend that Africa (or even the Americas) cannot yet be ruled out as the origin of the family.

The current hypothesis about the evolution of the genes needed for nodulation is that they were recruited from other pathways after a polyploidy event. Several different pathways have been implicated as donating duplicated genes to the pathways need for nodulation. The main donors to the pathway were the genes associated with the arbuscular mycorrhiza symbiosis genes, the pollen tube formation genes and the haemoglobin genes. One of the main genes shown to be shared between the arbuscular mycorrhiza pathway and the nodulation pathway is SYMRK and it is involved in the plant-bacterial recognition. The pollen tube growth is similar to the infection thread development in that infection threads grow in a polar manner that is similar to a pollen tubes polar growth towards the ovules. Both pathways include the same type of enzymes, pectin-degrading cell wall enzymes. The enzymes needed to reduce nitrogen, nitrogenases, require a substantial input of ATP but at the same time are sensitive to free oxygen. To meet the requirements of this paradoxical situation, the plants express a type of haemoglobin called leghemoglobin that is believed to be recruited after a duplication event. These three genetic pathways are believed to be part of a gene duplication event then recruited to work in nodulation.

=== Phylogeny and taxonomy ===
==== Phylogeny ====
The phylogeny of the legumes has been the object of many studies by research groups from around the world. These studies have used morphology, DNA data (the chloroplast intron trnL, the chloroplast genes rbcL and matK, or the ribosomal spacers ITS) and cladistic analysis in order to investigate the relationships between the family's different lineages. Fabaceae is consistently recovered as monophyletic. The studies further confirmed that the traditional subfamilies Mimosoideae and Papilionoideae were each monophyletic but both were nested within the paraphyletic subfamily Caesalpinioideae. All the different approaches yielded similar results regarding the relationships between the family's main clades. Following extensive discussion in the legume phylogenetics community, the Legume Phylogeny Working Group reclassified Fabaceae into six subfamilies, which necessitated the segregation of four new subfamilies from Caesalpinioideae and merging Caesapinioideae sensu stricto with the former subfamily Mimosoideae. The exact branching order of the different subfamilies is still unresolved.

- Fabales
  - Polygalaceae (outgroup)
  - Surianaceae (outgroup)
  - - Quillajaceae (outgroup)
    - Fabaceae
      - - Cercidoideae
        - Detarioideae
      - - Duparquetioideae
        - - Dialioideae
          - - Caesalpinioideae
            - Faboideae

==== Taxonomy ====
The Fabaceae are placed in the order Fabales according to most taxonomic systems, including the APG III system. The family now includes six subfamilies:

- Cercidoideae: 12 genera and ~335 species. Mainly tropical. Bauhinia, Cercis.
- Detarioideae: 84 genera and ~760 species. Mainly tropical. Amherstia, Detarium, Tamarindus.
- Duparquetioideae: 1 genus and 1 species. West and Central Africa. Duparquetia.
- Dialioideae: 17 genera and ~85 species. Widespread throughout the tropics. Dialium.
- Caesalpinioideae: 148 genera and ~4400 species. Pantropical. Caesalpinia, Senna, Mimosa, Acacia. Includes the former subfamily Mimosoideae (80 genera and ~3200 species; mostly tropical and warm temperate Asia and America).
- Faboideae (Papilionoideae): 503 genera and ~14,000 species. Cosmopolitan. Astragalus, Lupinus, Pisum.

== Ecology ==
=== Distribution and habitat ===
The Fabaceae have an essentially worldwide distribution, being found everywhere except Antarctica and the high Arctic. The trees are often found in tropical regions, while the herbaceous plants and shrubs are predominant outside the tropics.

=== Biological nitrogen fixation ===
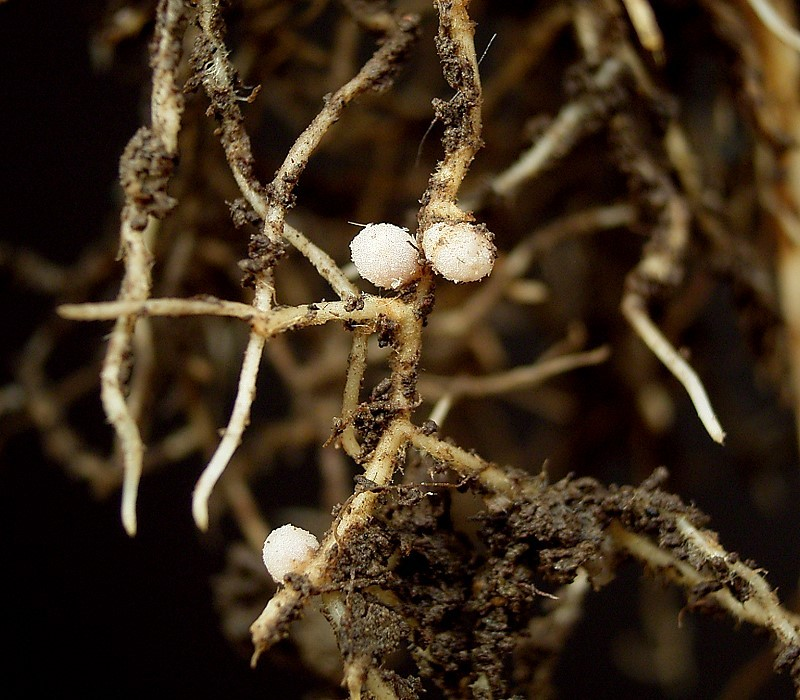
Roots of Vicia with white root nodules visible

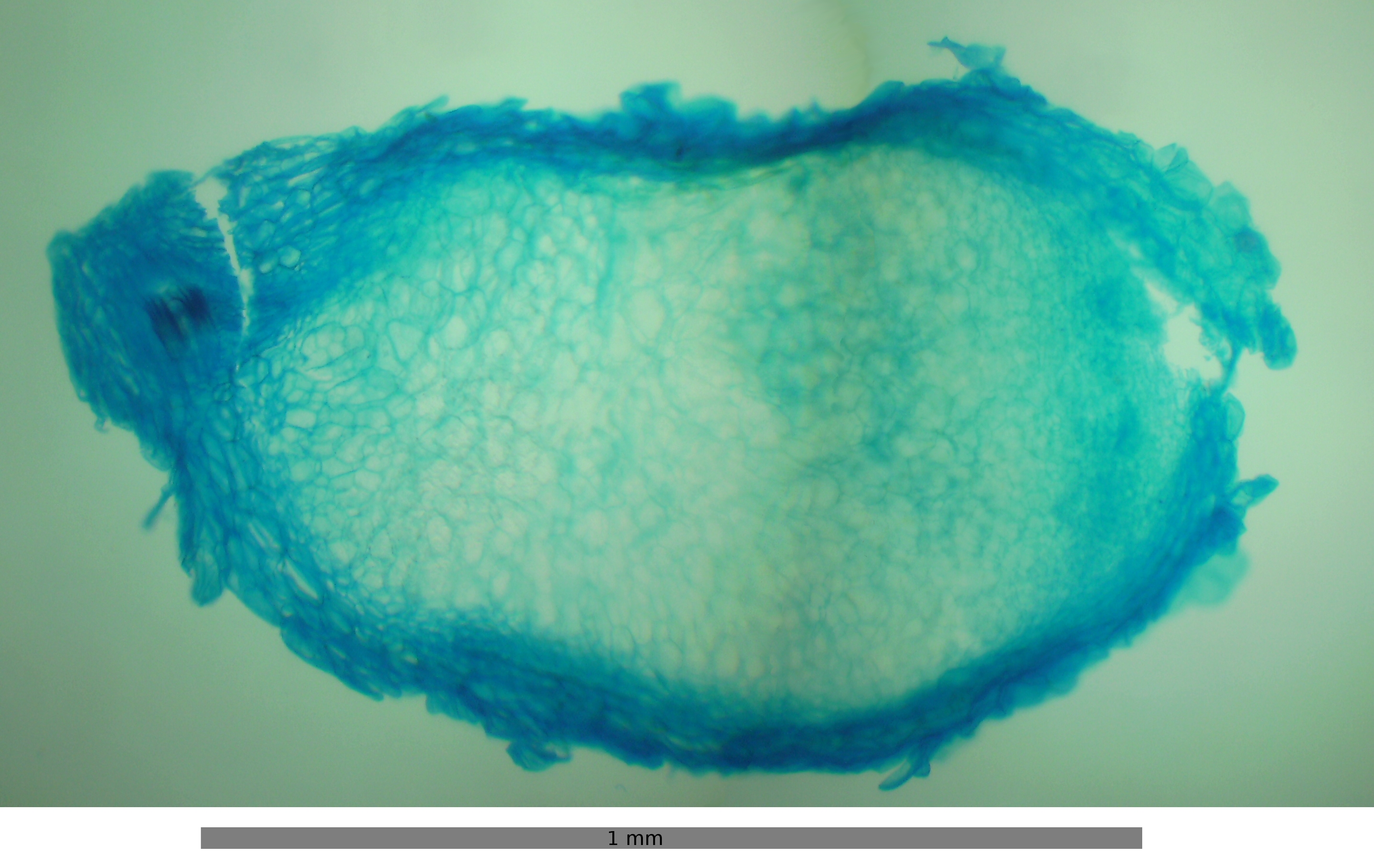
Cross-section through a root nodule of Vicia observed through a microscope

Biological nitrogen fixation (BNF, performed by the organisms called diazotrophs) is a very old process that probably originated in the Archean eon when the primitive atmosphere lacked oxygen. It is only carried out by Euryarchaeota and just 6 of the more than 50 phyla of bacteria. Some of these lineages co-evolved together with the flowering plants establishing the molecular basis of a mutually beneficial symbiotic relationship. BNF is carried out in nodules that are mainly located in the root cortex, although they are occasionally located in the stem as in Sesbania rostrata. The spermatophytes that co-evolved with actinorhizal diazotrophs (Frankia) or with rhizobia to establish their symbiotic relationship belong to 11 families contained within the Rosidae clade (as established by the gene molecular phylogeny of rbcL, a gene coding for part of the RuBisCO enzyme in the chloroplast). This grouping indicates that the predisposition for forming nodules probably only arose once in flowering plants and that it can be considered as an ancestral characteristic that has been conserved or lost in certain lineages. However, such a wide distribution of families and genera within this lineage indicates that nodulation had multiple origins. Of the 10 families within the Rosidae, 8 have nodules formed by actinomyces (Betulaceae, Casuarinaceae, Coriariaceae, Datiscaceae, Elaeagnaceae, Myricaceae, Rhamnaceae and Rosaceae), and the two remaining families, Ulmaceae and Fabaceae have nodules formed by rhizobia.

The rhizobia and their hosts must be able to recognize each other for nodule formation to commence. Rhizobia are specific to particular host species although a rhizobia species may often infect more than one host species. This means that one plant species may be infected by more than one species of bacteria. For example, nodules in Acacia senegal can contain seven species of rhizobia belonging to three different genera. The most distinctive characteristics that allow rhizobia to be distinguished apart are the rapidity of their growth and the type of root nodule that they form with their host. Root nodules can be classified as being either indeterminate, cylindrical and often branched, and determinate, spherical with prominent lenticels. Indeterminate nodules are characteristic of legumes from temperate climates, while determinate nodules are commonly found in species from tropical or subtropical climates.

Nodule formation is common throughout the Fabaceae. It is found in the majority of its members that only form an association with rhizobia, which in turn form an exclusive symbiosis with the Fabaceae (with the exception of Parasponia, the only genus of the 18 Ulmaceae genera that is capable of forming nodules). Nodule formation is present in all the Fabaceae sub-families, although it is less common in the Caesalpinioideae. All types of nodule formation are present in the subfamily Papilionoideae: indeterminate (with the meristem retained), determinate (without meristem) and the type included in Aeschynomene. The latter two are thought to be the most modern and specialised type of nodule as they are only present in some lines of the subfamily Papilionoideae. Even though nodule formation is common in the two monophyletic subfamilies Papilionoideae and Mimosoideae they also contain species that do not form nodules. The presence or absence of nodule-forming species within the three sub-families indicates that nodule formation has arisen several times during the evolution of the Fabaceae and that this ability has been lost in some lineages. For example, within the genus Senegalia, a member of the Mimosoideae, S. pentagona does not form nodules, while other species of the same subfamily readily form nodules, as is the case for Acacia senegal, which forms both rapidly and slow growing rhizobial nodules.

=== Chemical ecology ===
A large number of species within many genera of leguminous plants, e.g. Astragalus, Coronilla, Hippocrepis, Indigofera, Lotus, Securigera and Scorpiurus, produce chemicals that derive from the compound 3-nitropropanoic acid (3-NPA, beta-nitropropionic acid). The free acid 3-NPA is an irreversible inhibitor of mitochondrial respiration, and thus the compound inhibits the tricarboxylic acid cycle. This inhibition caused by 3-NPA is especially toxic to nerve cells and represents a very general toxic mechanism suggesting a profound ecological importance due to the big number of species producing this compound and its derivatives. A second and closely related class of secondary metabolites that occur in many species of leguminous plants is defined by isoxazolin-5-one derivatives. These compounds occur in particular together with 3-NPA and related derivatives at the same time in the same species, as found in Astragalus canadensis and Astragalus collinus. 3-NPA and isoxazlin-5-one derivatives also occur in many species of leaf beetles (see defense in insects).

== Economic and cultural importance ==
Legumes are economically and culturally important plants due to their extraordinary diversity and abundance, the wide variety of edible vegetables they represent and due to the variety of uses they can be put to: in horticulture and agriculture, as a food, for the compounds they contain that have medicinal uses, and for the oil and fats they contain that have a variety of uses.

=== Food and forage ===
The history of legumes is tied in closely with that of human civilization, appearing early in Asia, the Americas (the common bean, several varieties) and Europe (broad beans) by 6,000 BCE, where they became a staple, essential as a source of protein.

Their ability to fix atmospheric nitrogen reduces fertilizer costs for farmers and gardeners who grow legumes, and means that legumes can be used in a crop rotation to replenish soil that has been depleted of nitrogen. Legume seeds and foliage have a comparatively higher protein content than non-legume materials, due to the additional nitrogen that legumes receive through the process. Legumes are commonly used as natural fertilizers. Some legume species perform hydraulic lift, which makes them ideal for intercropping.

Farmed legumes can belong to numerous classes, including forage, grain, blooms, pharmaceutical/industrial, fallow/green manure and timber species, with most commercially farmed species filling two or more roles simultaneously.

There are of two broad types of forage legumes. Some, like alfalfa, clover, vetch, and Arachis, are sown in pasture and grazed by livestock. Other forage legumes such as Leucaena or Albizia are woody shrub or tree species that are either broken down by livestock or regularly cut by humans to provide fodder.

Grain legumes are cultivated for their seeds, and are also called pulses. The seeds are used for human and animal consumption or for the production of oils for industrial uses. Grain legumes include both herbaceous plants like beans, lentils, lupins, peas and peanuts, and trees such as carob, mesquite and tamarind.

Lathyrus tuberosus, once extensively cultivated in Europe, forms tubers used for human consumption.

Bloom legume species include species such as lupin, which are farmed commercially for their blooms, and thus are popular in gardens worldwide. Laburnum, Robinia, Gleditsia (honey locust), Acacia, Mimosa, and Delonix are ornamental trees and shrubs.

Industrial farmed legumes include Indigofera, cultivated for the production of indigo, Acacia, for gum arabic, and Derris, for the insecticide action of rotenone, a compound it produces.

Fallow or green manure legume species are cultivated to be tilled back into the soil to exploit the high nitrogen levels found in most legumes. Numerous legumes are farmed for this purpose, including Leucaena, Cyamopsis and Sesbania.

Various legume species are farmed for timber production worldwide, including numerous Acacia species, Dalbergia species, and Castanospermum australe.

Melliferous plants offer nectar to bees and other insects to encourage them to carry pollen from the flowers of one plant to others thereby ensuring pollination. Many Fabaceae species are important sources of pollen and nectar for bees, including for honey production in the beekeeping industry. Example Fabaceae such as alfalfa, and various clovers including white clover and sweet clover, are important sources of nectar and honey for the Western honey bee.

=== Industrial uses ===
==== Natural gums ====
Natural gums are vegetable exudates that are released as the result of damage to the plant such as that resulting from the attack of an insect or a natural or artificial cut. These exudates contain heterogeneous polysaccharides formed of different sugars and usually containing uronic acids. They form viscous colloidal solutions. There are different species that produce gums. The most important of these species belong to the Fabaceae. They are widely used in the pharmaceutical, cosmetic, food, and textile sectors. They also have interesting therapeutic properties; for example gum arabic is antitussive and anti-inflammatory. The most well known gums are tragacanth (Astragalus gummifer), gum arabic (Acacia senegal) and guar gum (Cyamopsis tetragonoloba).

=== Dyes ===
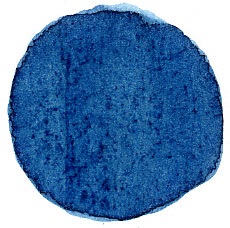
Indigo colorant

Several species of Fabaceae are used to produce dyes. The heartwood of logwood, Haematoxylon campechianum, is used to produce red and purple dyes. The histological stain called haematoxylin is produced from this species. The wood of the Brazilwood tree (Caesalpinia echinata) is also used to produce a red or purple dye. The Madras thorn (Pithecellobium dulce) has reddish fruit that are used to produce a yellow dye. Indigo dye is extracted from the indigo plant Indigofera tinctoria that is native to Asia. In Central and South America dyes are produced from two species in the same genus: indigo and Maya blue from Indigofera suffruticosa and Natal indigo from Indigofera arrecta. Yellow dyes are extracted from Butea monosperma, commonly called flame of the forest and from dyer's greenweed, (Genista tinctoria).

=== Ornamentals ===
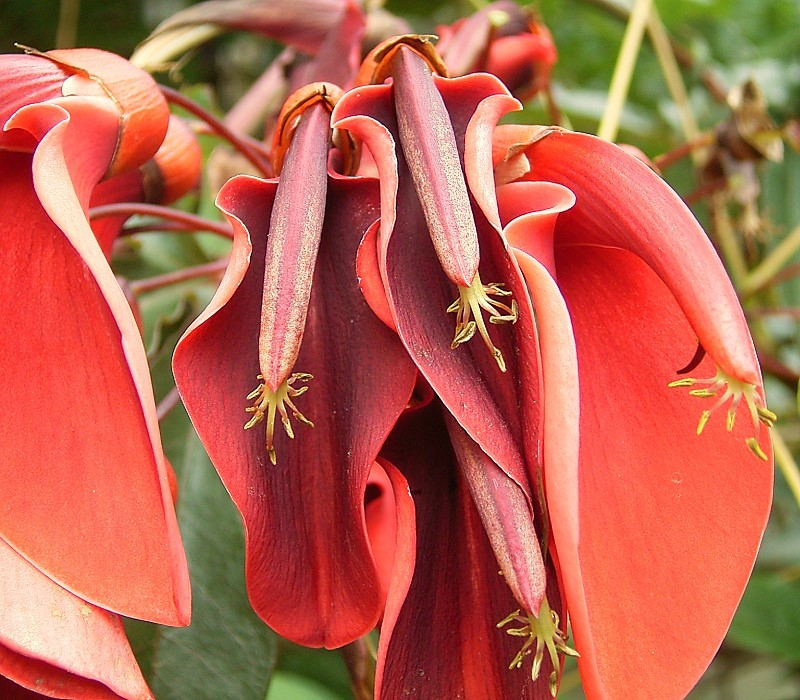
The cockspur coral tree Erythrina crista-galli is one of many Fabaceae used as ornamental plants. In addition, it is the national flower of Argentina and Uruguay.

Legumes have been used as ornamental plants throughout the world for many centuries. Their vast diversity of heights, shapes, foliage and flower colour means that this family is commonly used in the design and planting of everything from small gardens to large parks. The following is a list of the main ornamental legume species, listed by subfamily.

- Subfamily Caesalpinioideae: Bauhinia forficata, Caesalpinia gilliesii, Caesalpinia spinosa, Ceratonia siliqua, Cercis siliquastrum, Gleditsia triacanthos, Gymnocladus dioica, Parkinsonia aculeata, Senna multiglandulosa.
- Subfamily Mimosoideae: Acacia caven, Acacia cultriformis, Acacia dealbata, Acacia karroo, Acacia longifolia, Acacia melanoxylon, Acacia paradoxa, Acacia retinodes, Acacia saligna, Acacia verticillata, Acacia visco, Albizzia julibrissin, Calliandra tweediei, Paraserianthes lophantha, Prosopis chilensis.
- Subfamily Faboideae: Clianthus puniceus, Cytisus scoparius, Erythrina crista-galli, Erythrina falcata, Laburnum anagyroides, Lotus berthelotii, Lupinus arboreus, Lupinus polyphyllus, Otholobium glandulosum, Retama monosperma, Robinia hispida, Robinia neomexicana, Robinia pseudoacacia, Sophora japonica, Sophora macnabiana, Sophora macrocarpa, Spartium junceum, Teline monspessulana, Tipuana tipu, Wisteria sinensis.

== Emblematic Fabaceae ==
- The cockspur coral tree (Erythrina crista-galli), is the national flower of Argentina and Uruguay.
- The elephant ear tree (Enterolobium cyclocarpum) is the national tree of Costa Rica, by Executive Order of 31 August 1959.
- The brazilwood tree (Caesalpinia echinata) has been the national tree of Brazil since 1978.
- The golden wattle Acacia pycnantha is Australia's national flower.
- The Hong Kong orchid tree Bauhinia blakeana is the national flower of Hong Kong.
- The Bluebonnet, a regional name for Lupins such as Lupinus texensis, is the state flower of Texas

== Image gallery ==
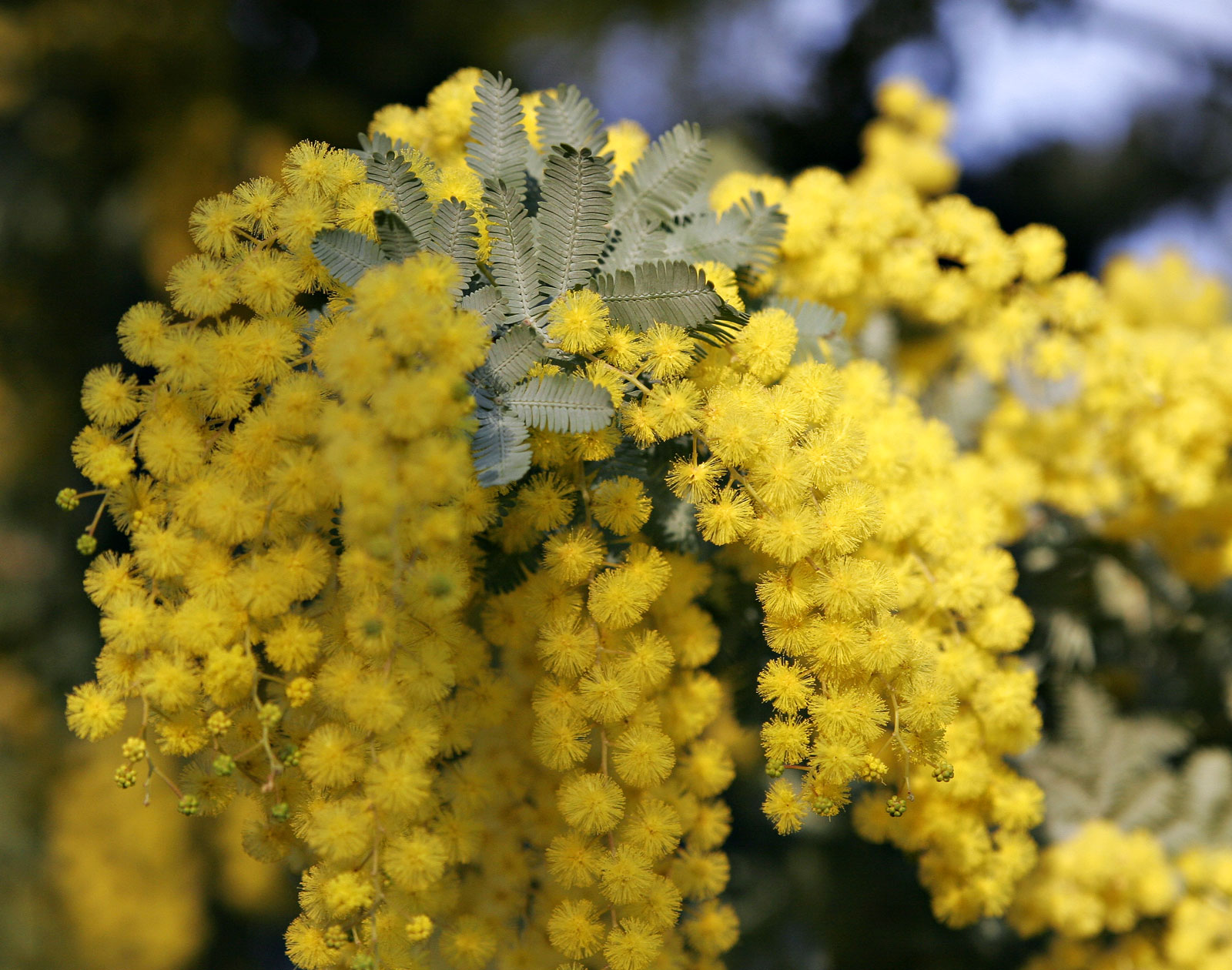
Acacia baileyana (wattle)

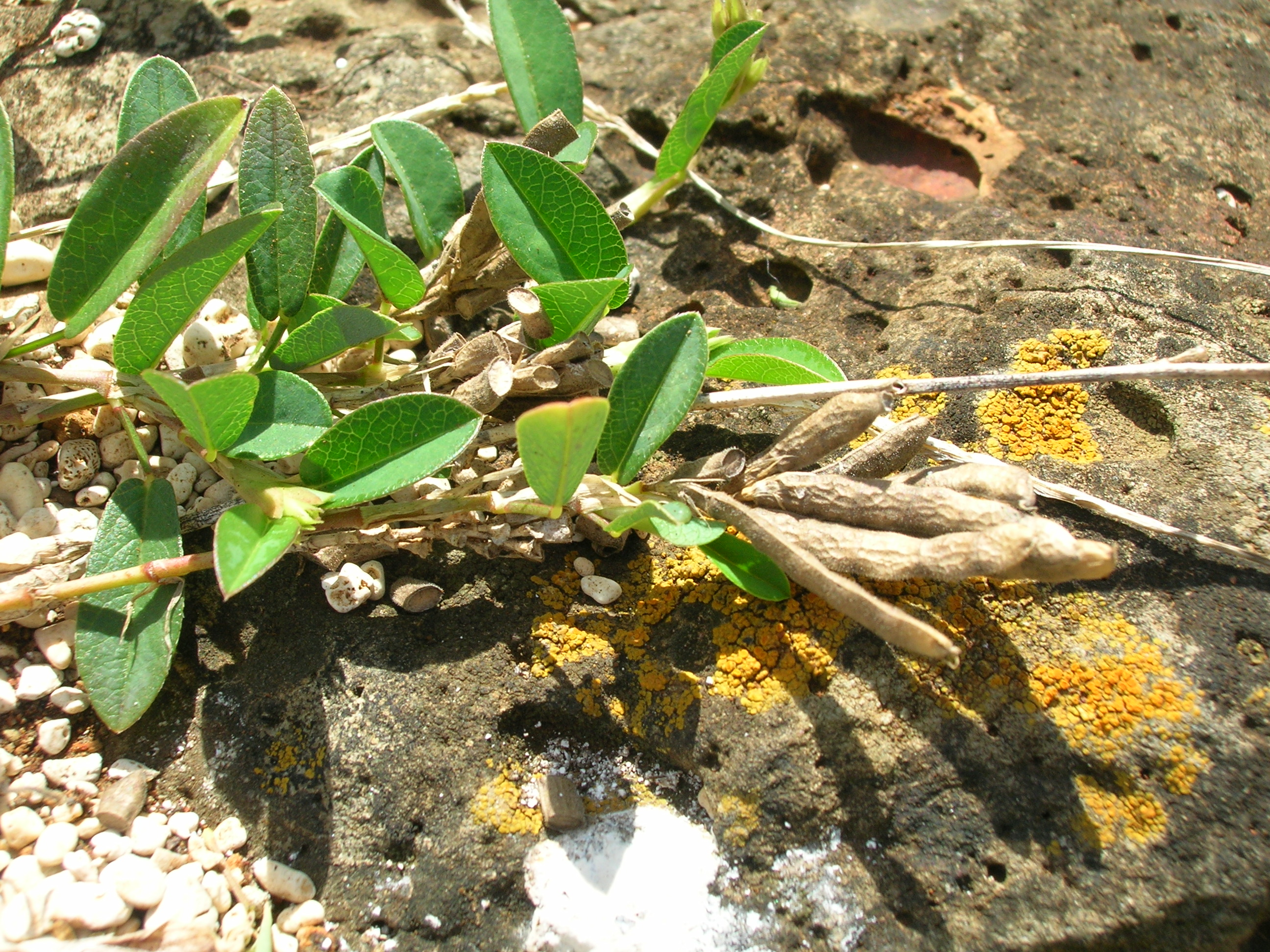
Loments of Alysicarpus vaginalis

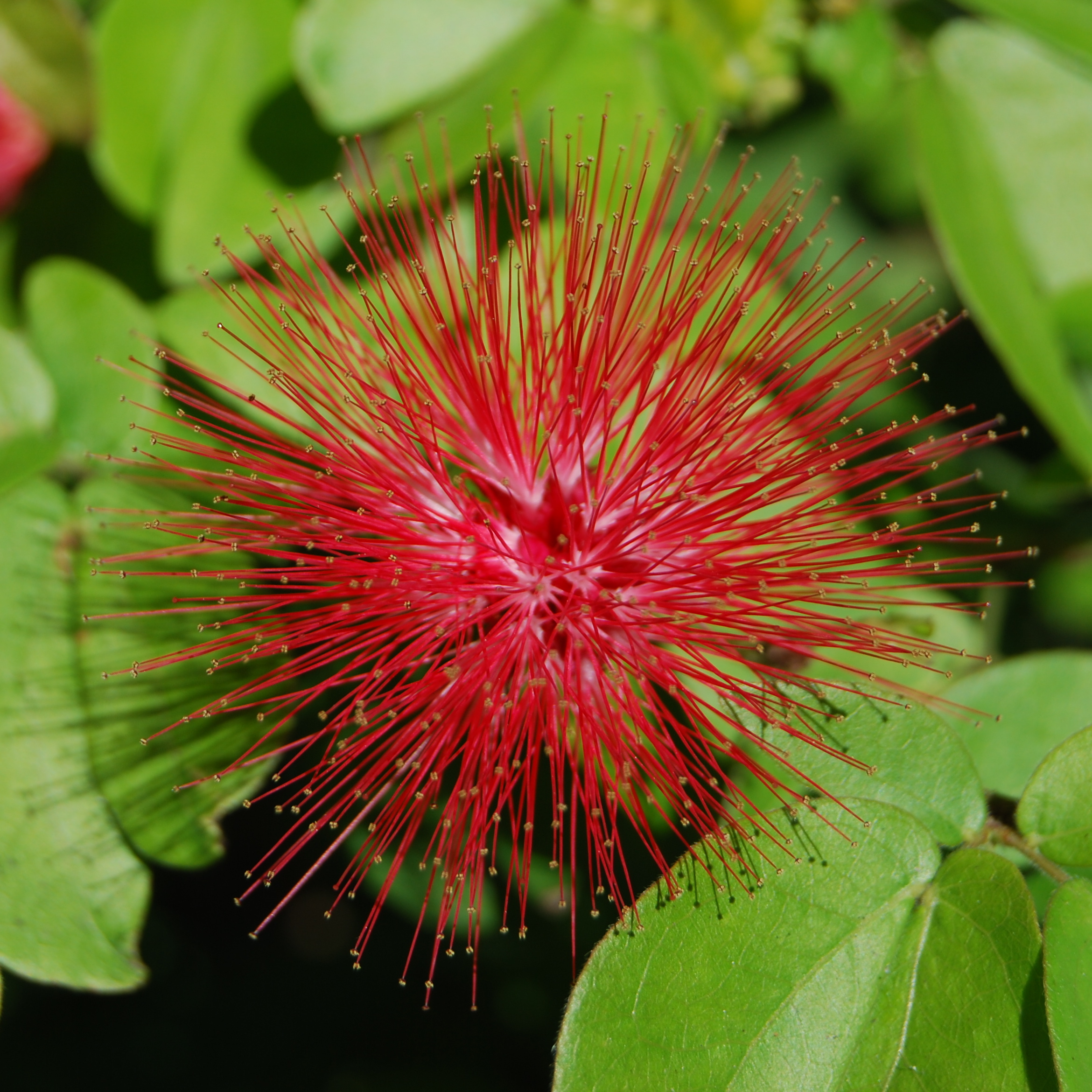
Calliandra emarginata

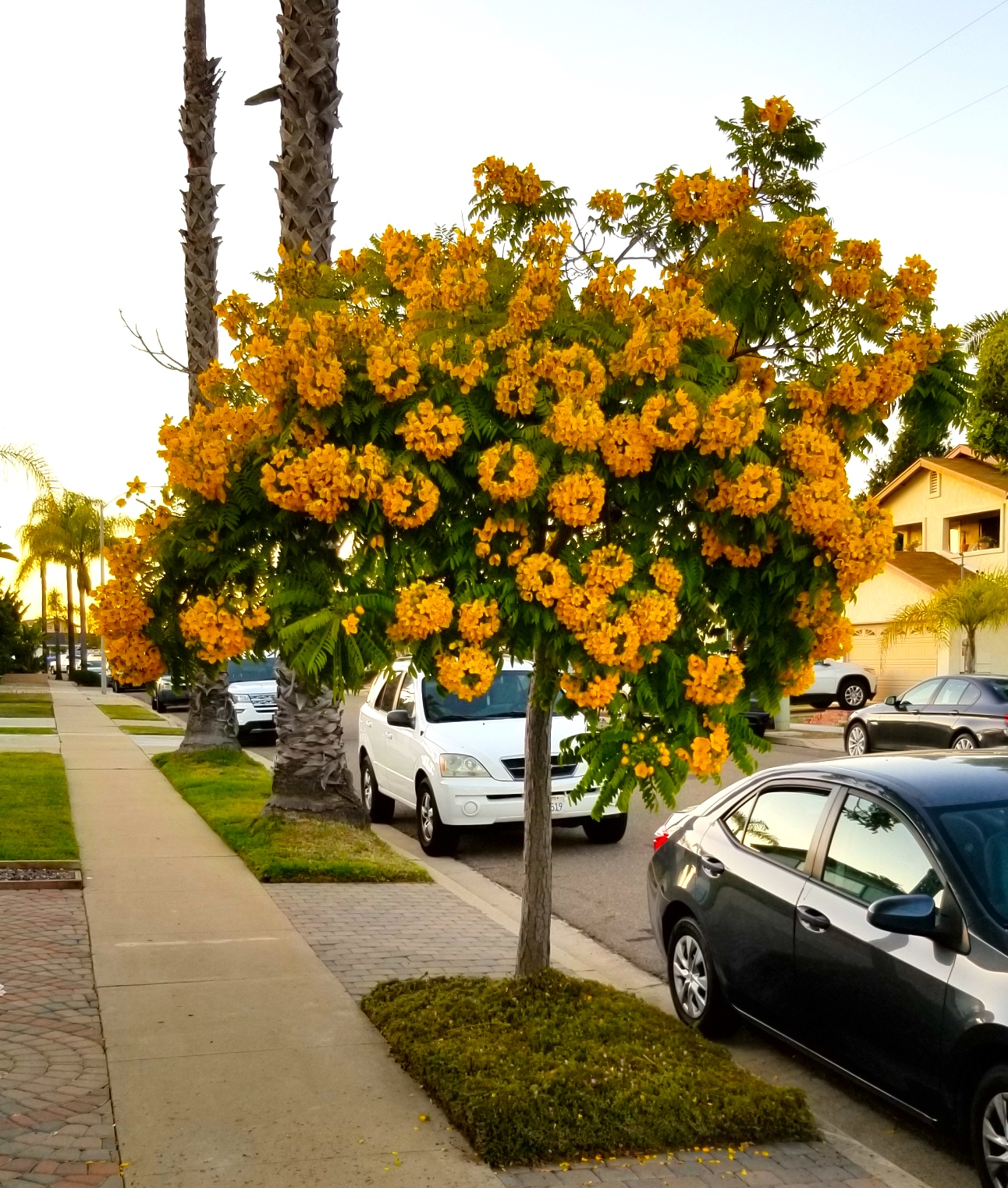
Cassia leptophylla tree

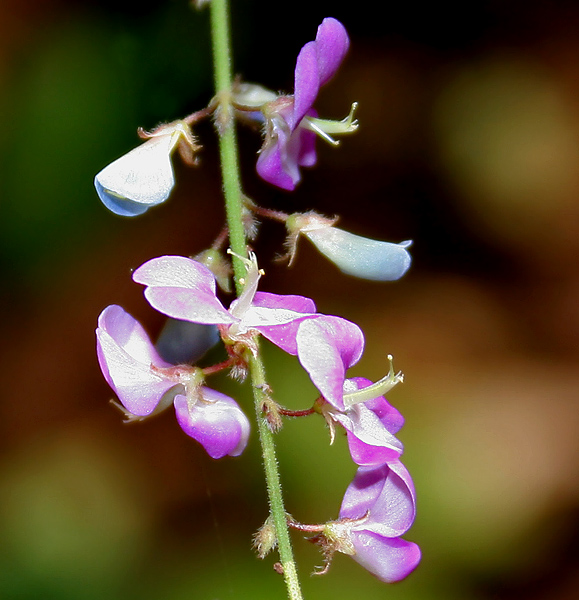
Pleurolobus gangeticus

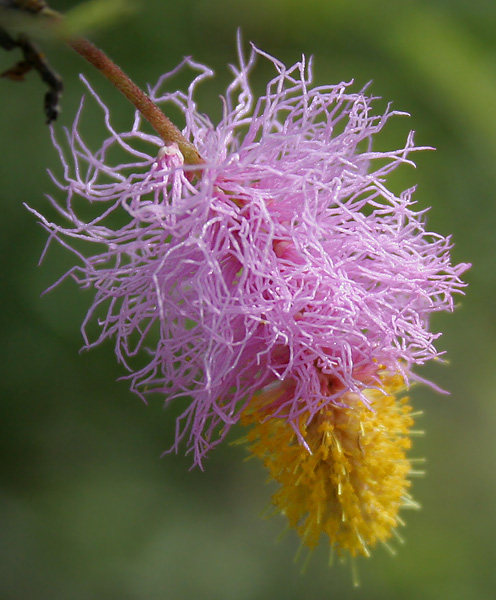
Dichrostachys cinerea sickle bush

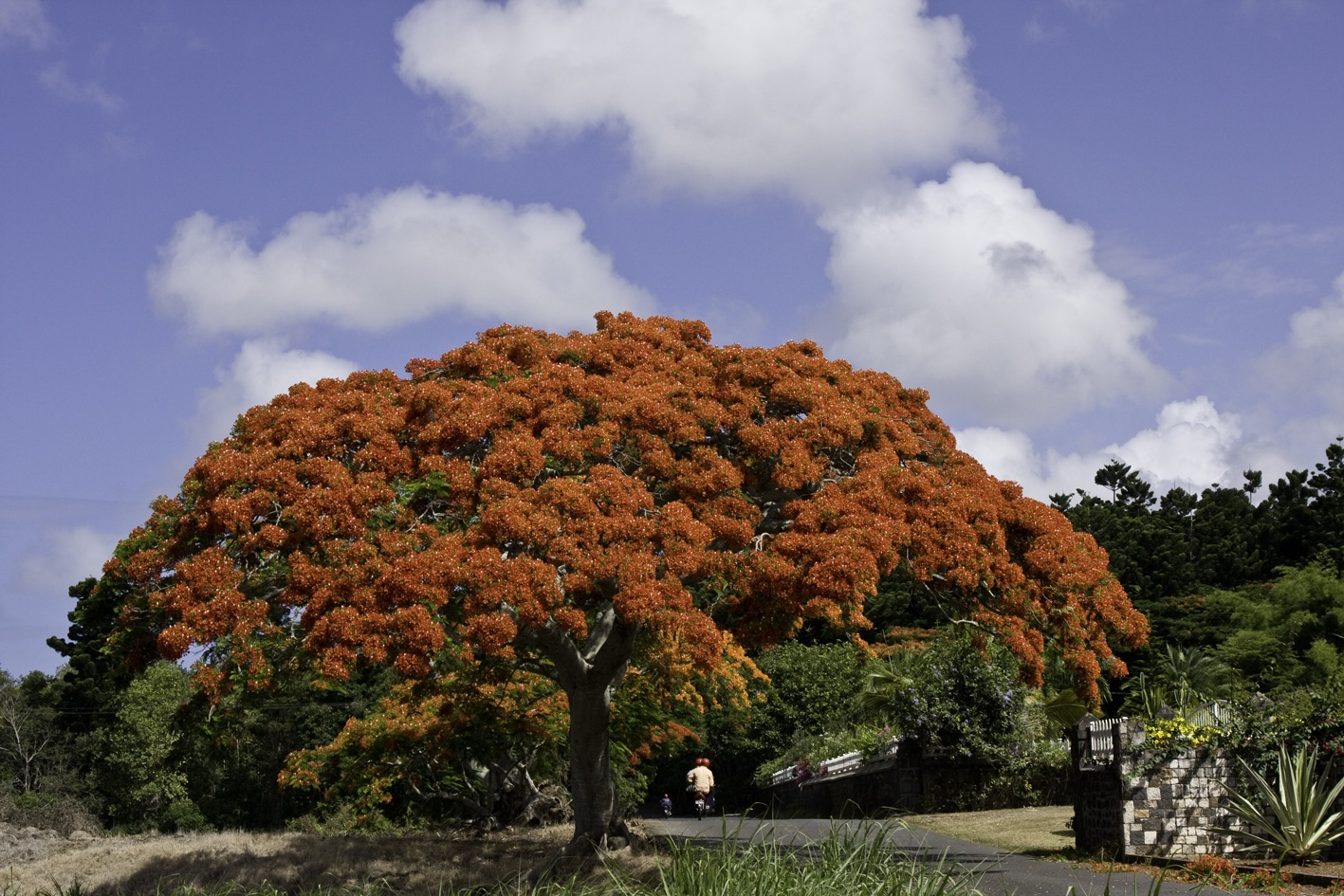
Delonix regia tree

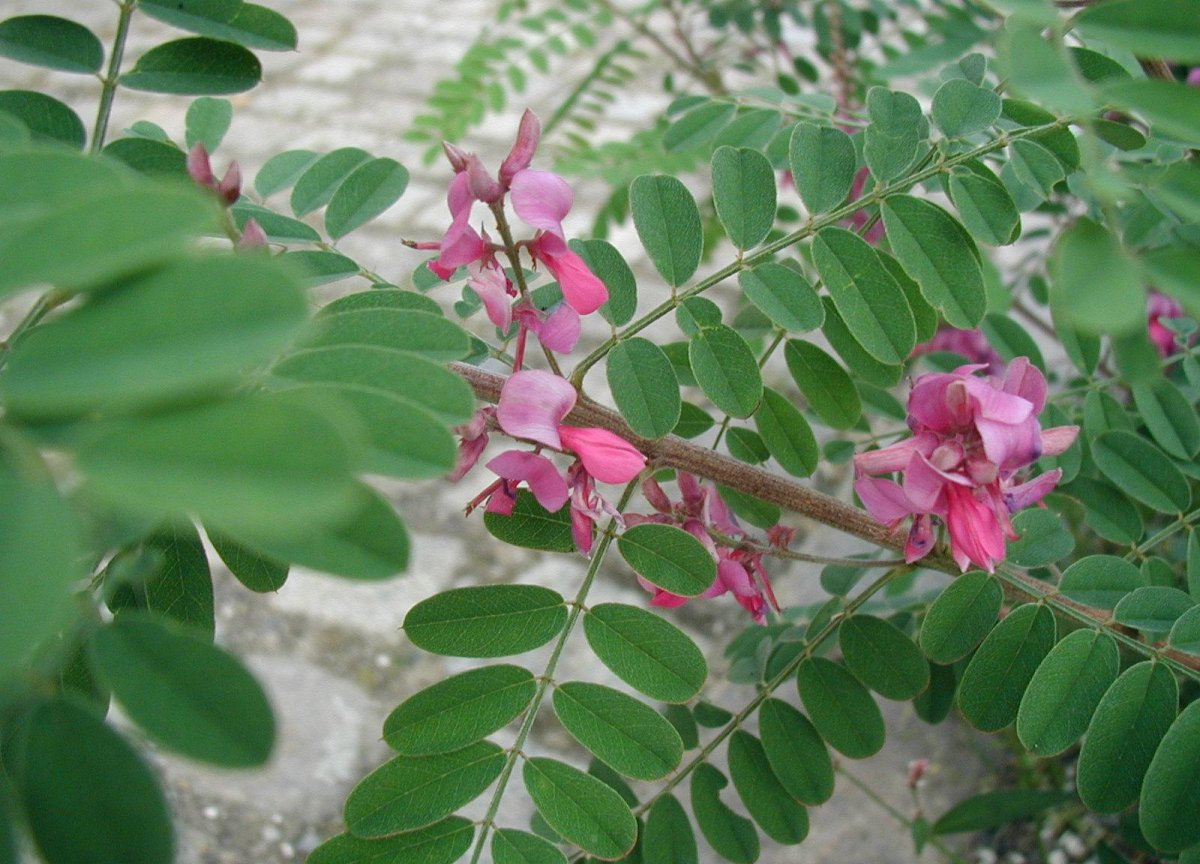
Indigofera gerardiana

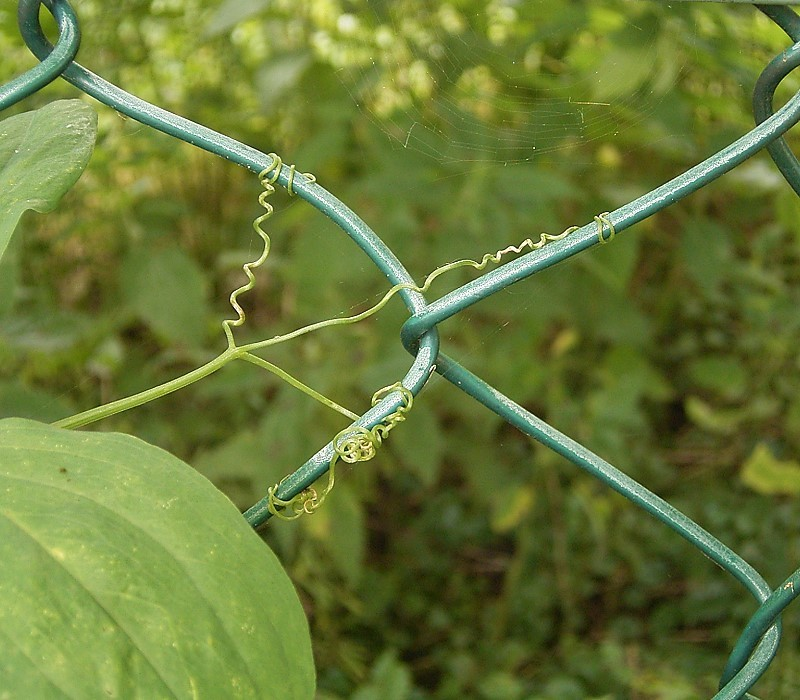
Tendrils of Lathyrus odoratus (sweet pea)

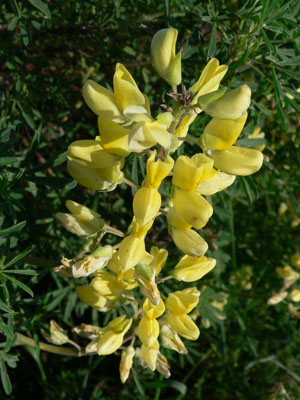
Inflorescence of Lupinus arboreus (yellow bush lupin)

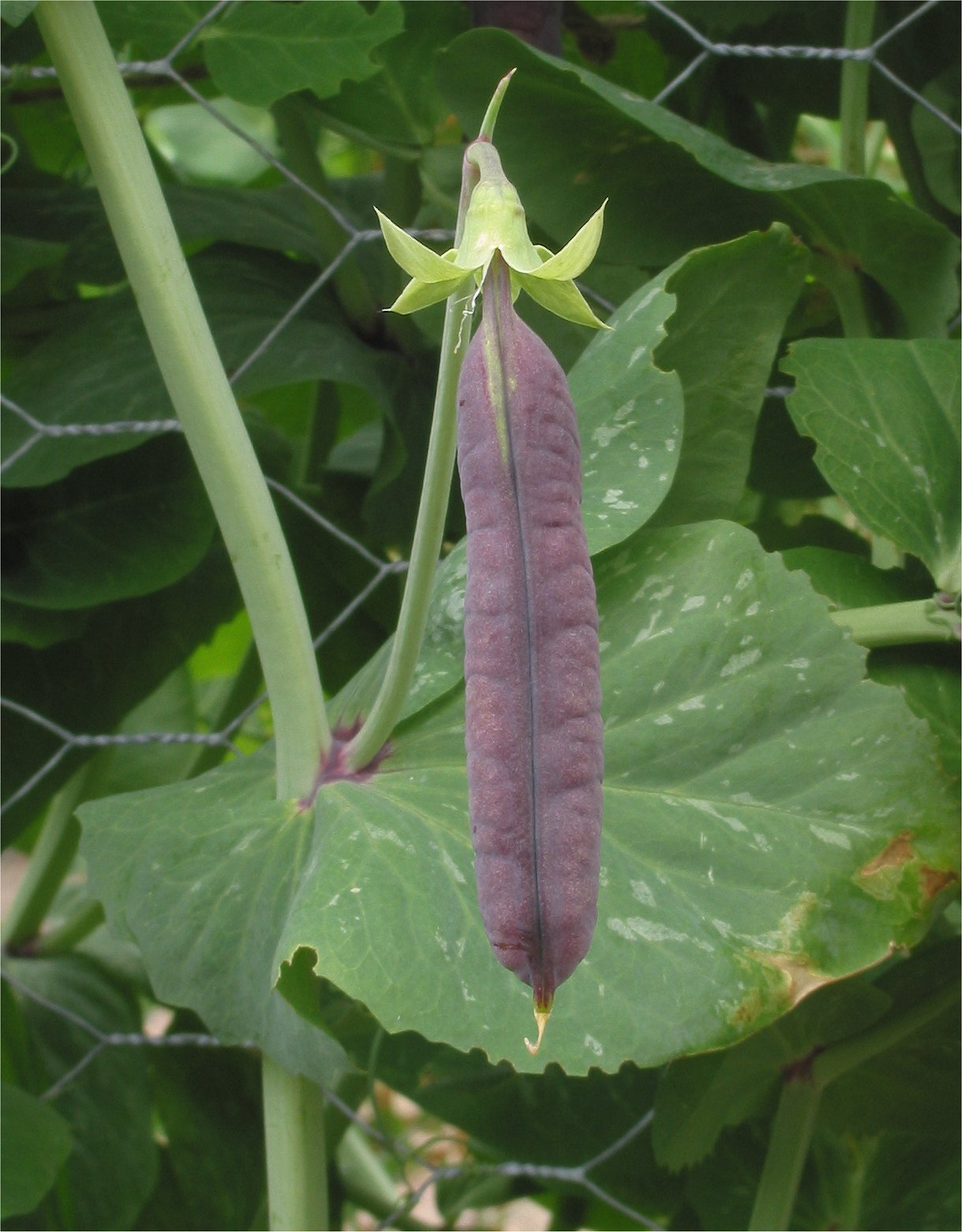
Pisum sativum (peas); note the leaf-like stipules

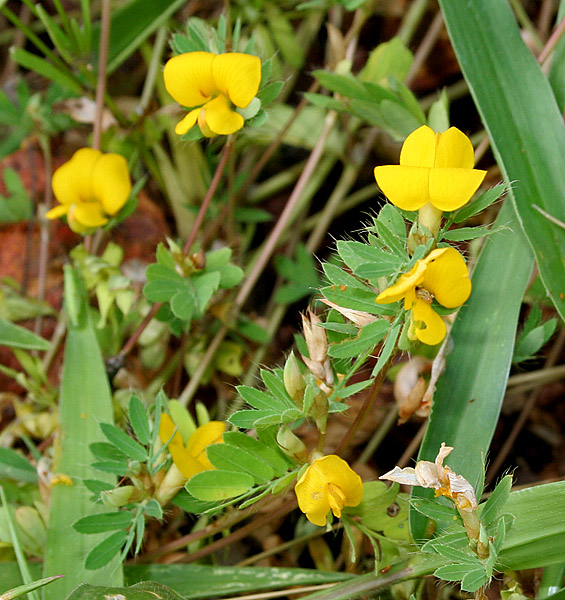
Smithia conferta

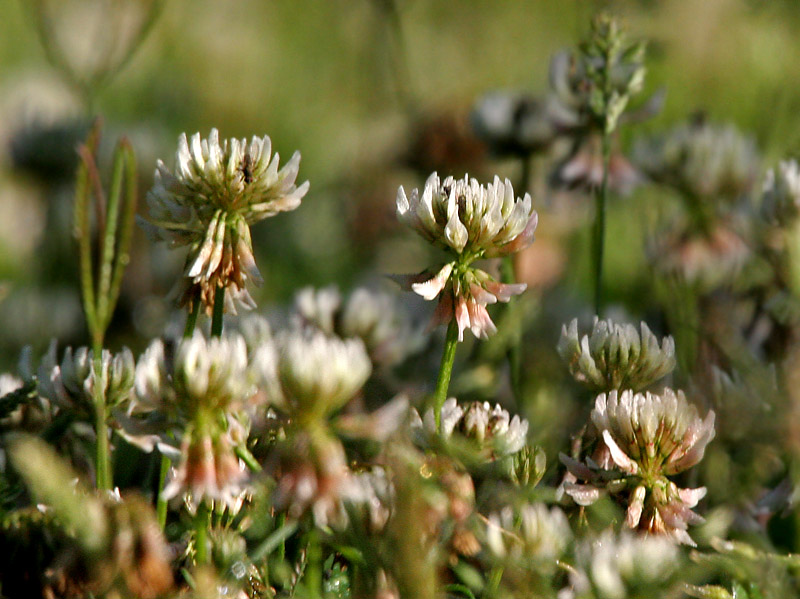
Trifolium repens in Kullu District of Himachal Pradesh, India

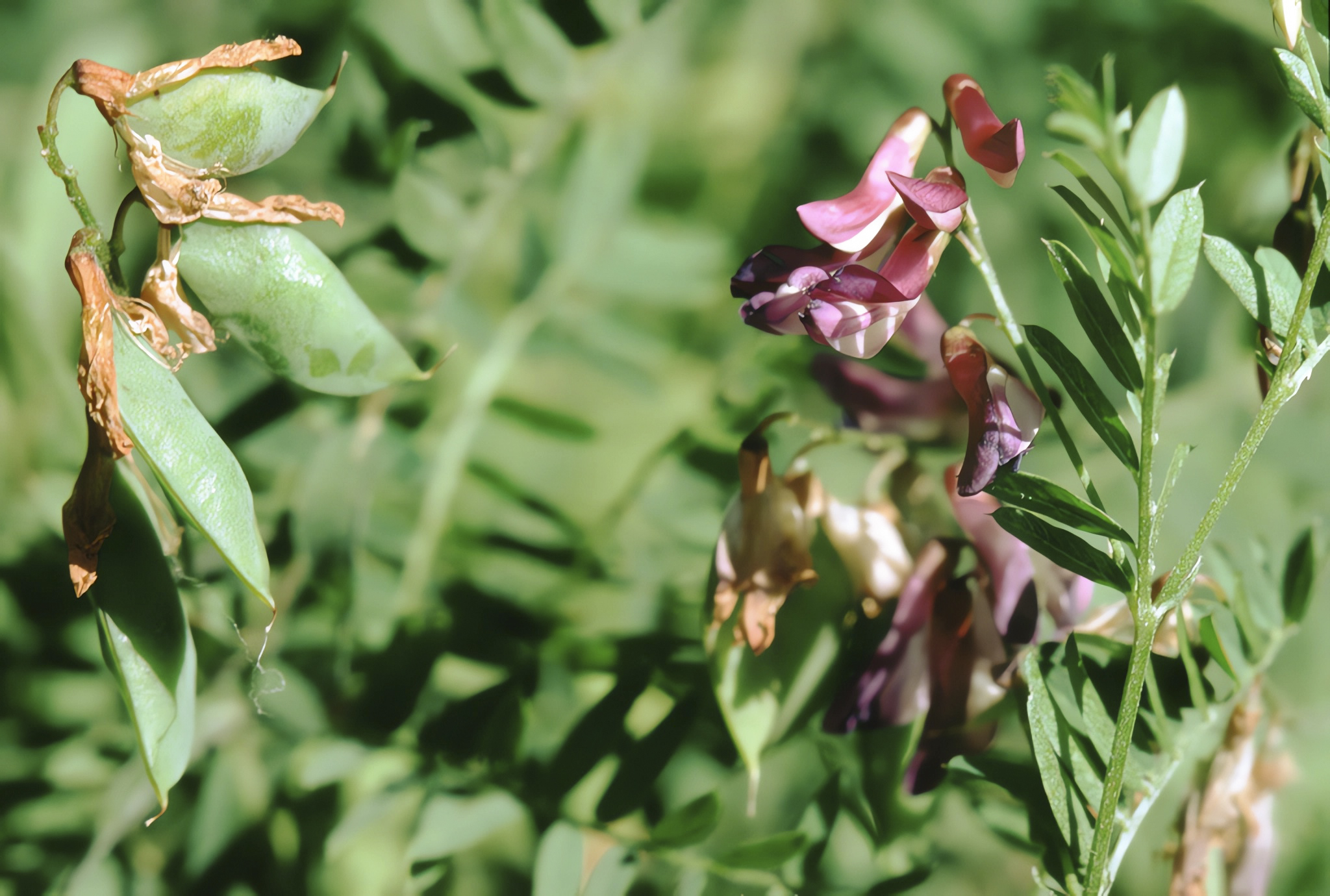
Kashubian vetch – Kashubia

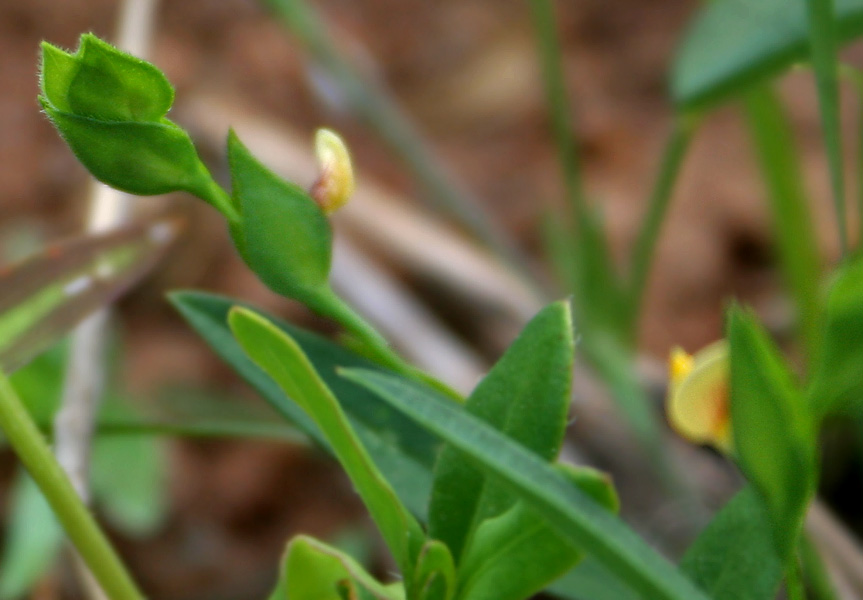
Zornia gibbosa

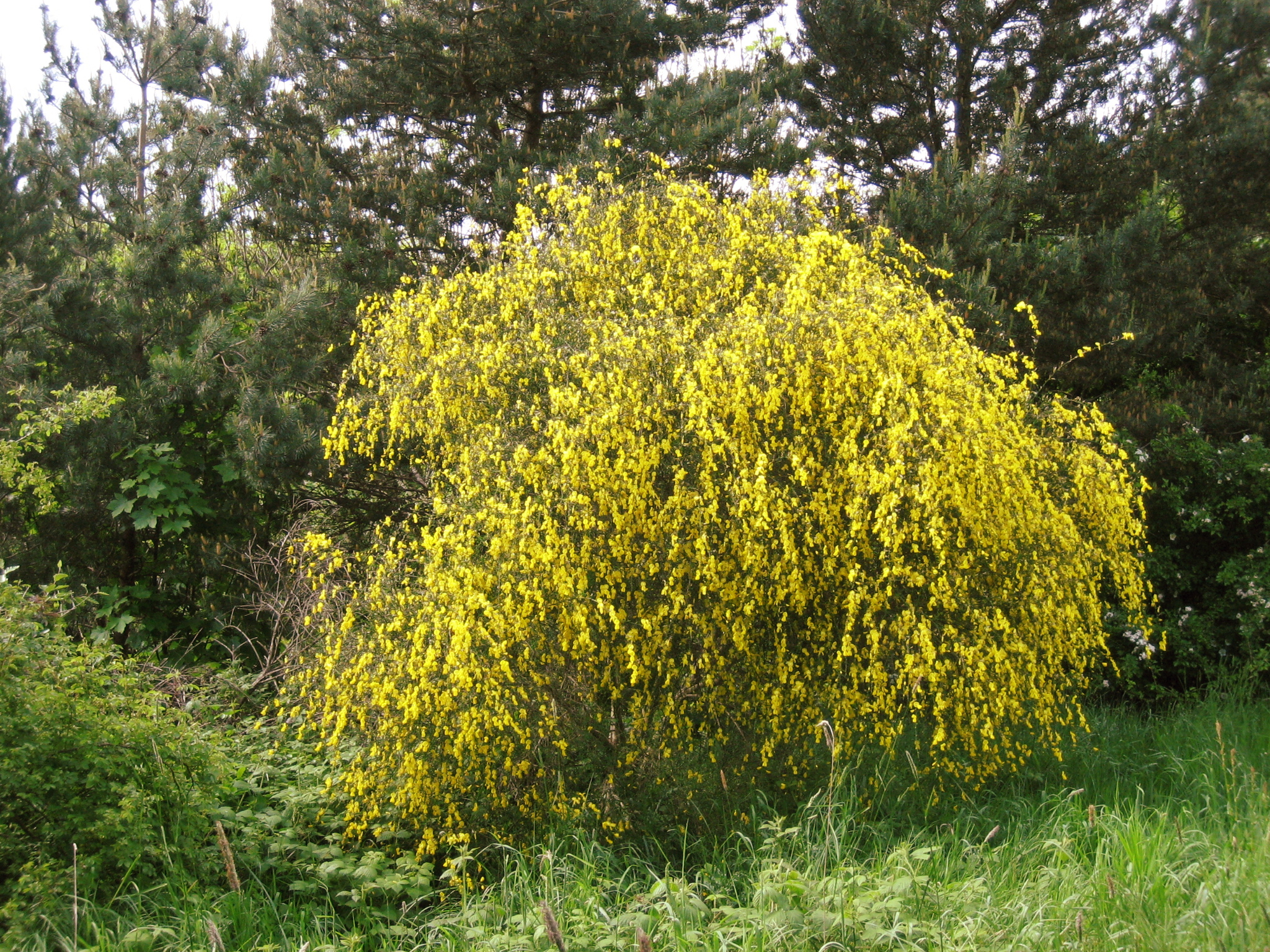
Cytisus scoparius (Scotch broom)

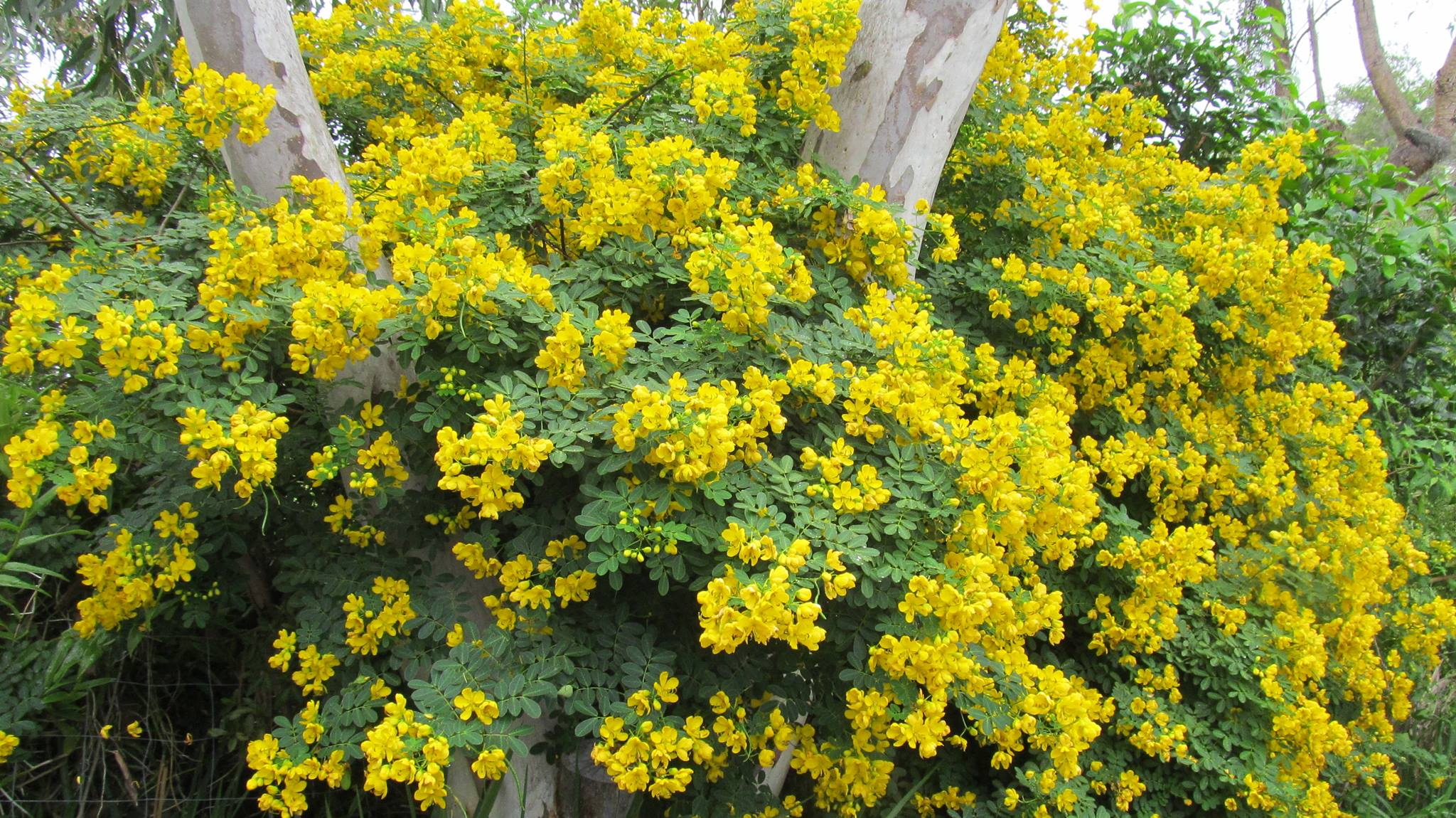
Senna pendula (Easter cassia)

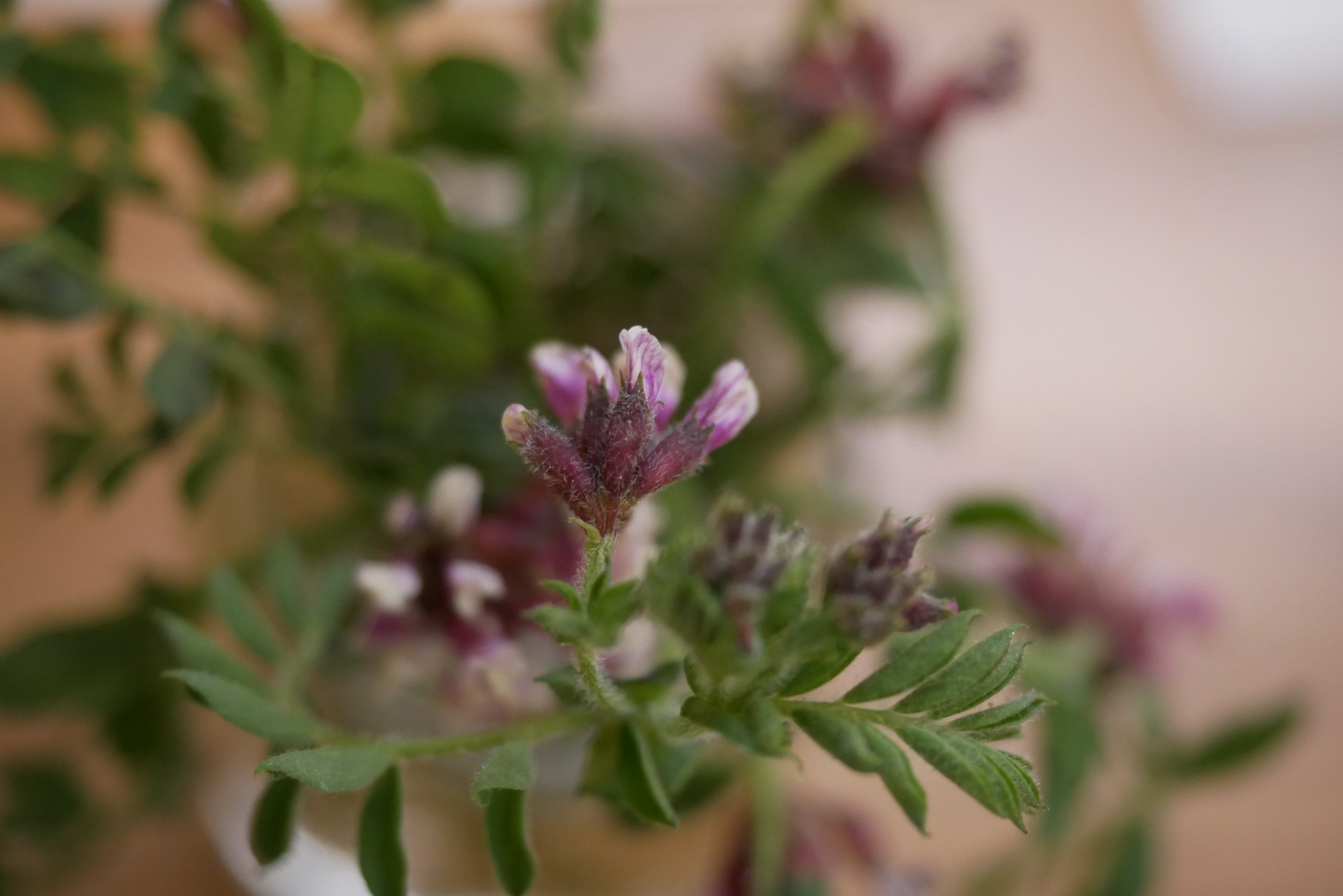
Hosackia stipularis (stipulate lotus)

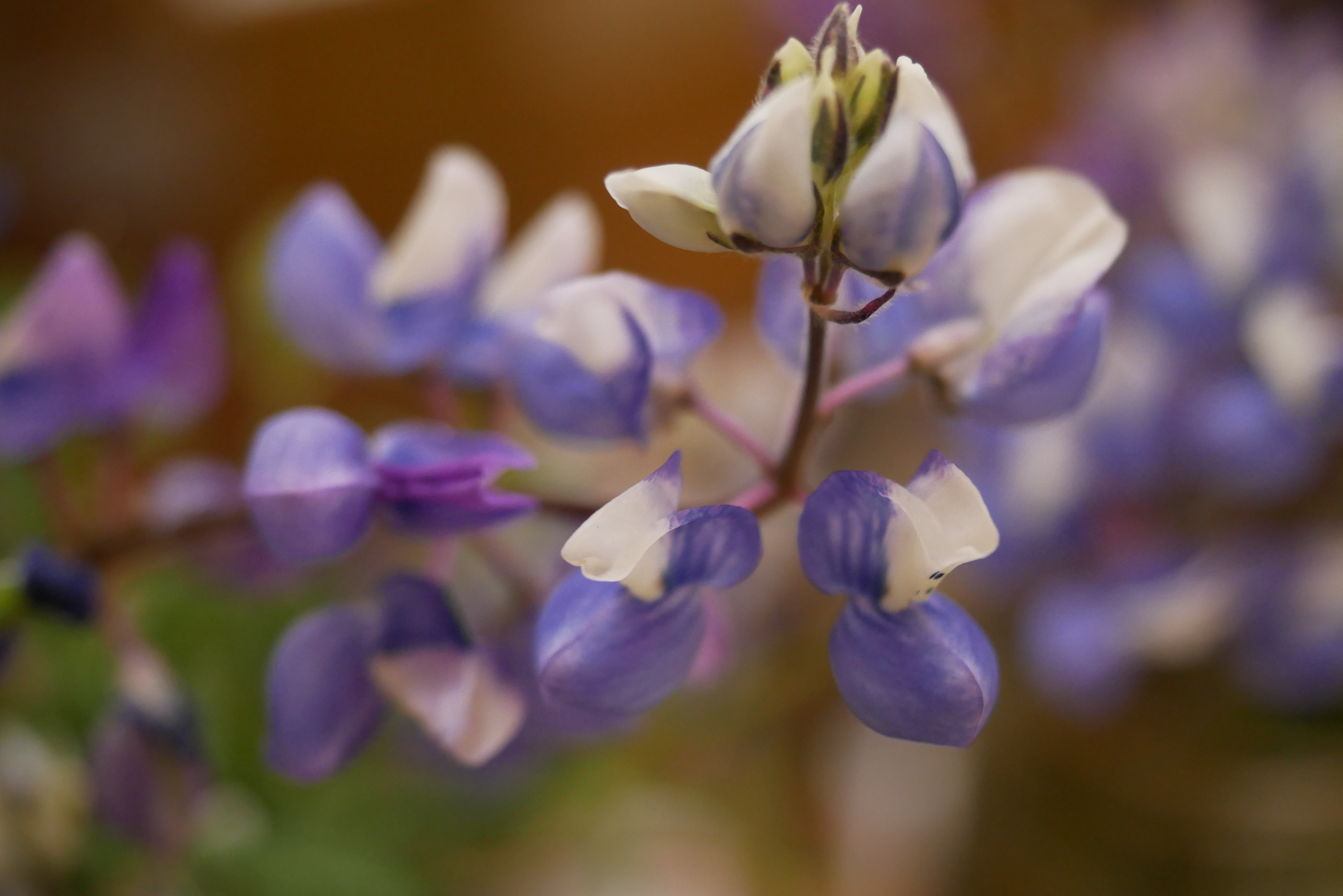
Lupinus nanus (sky lupine)

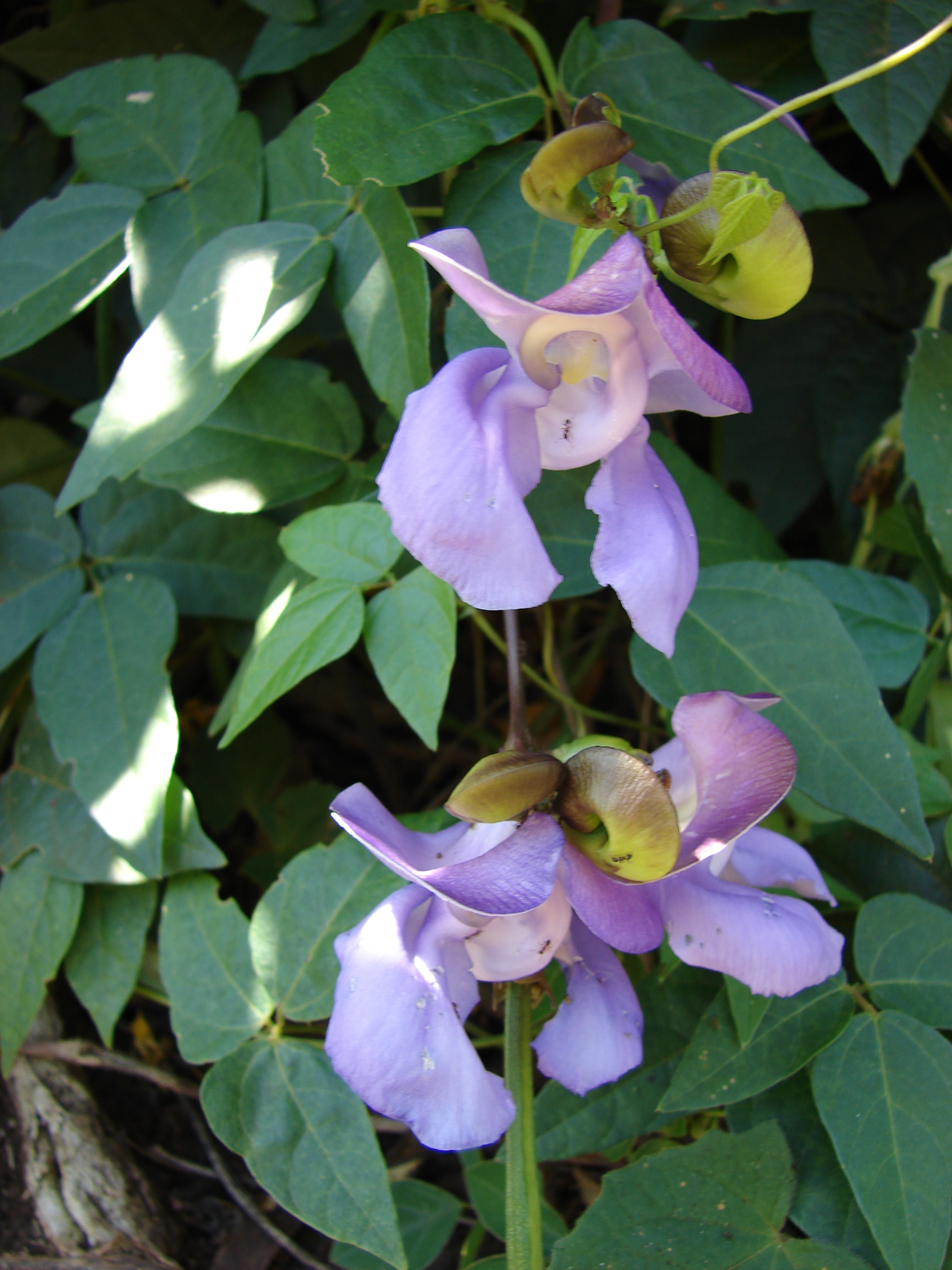
Vigna caracalla (snail vine) flowers

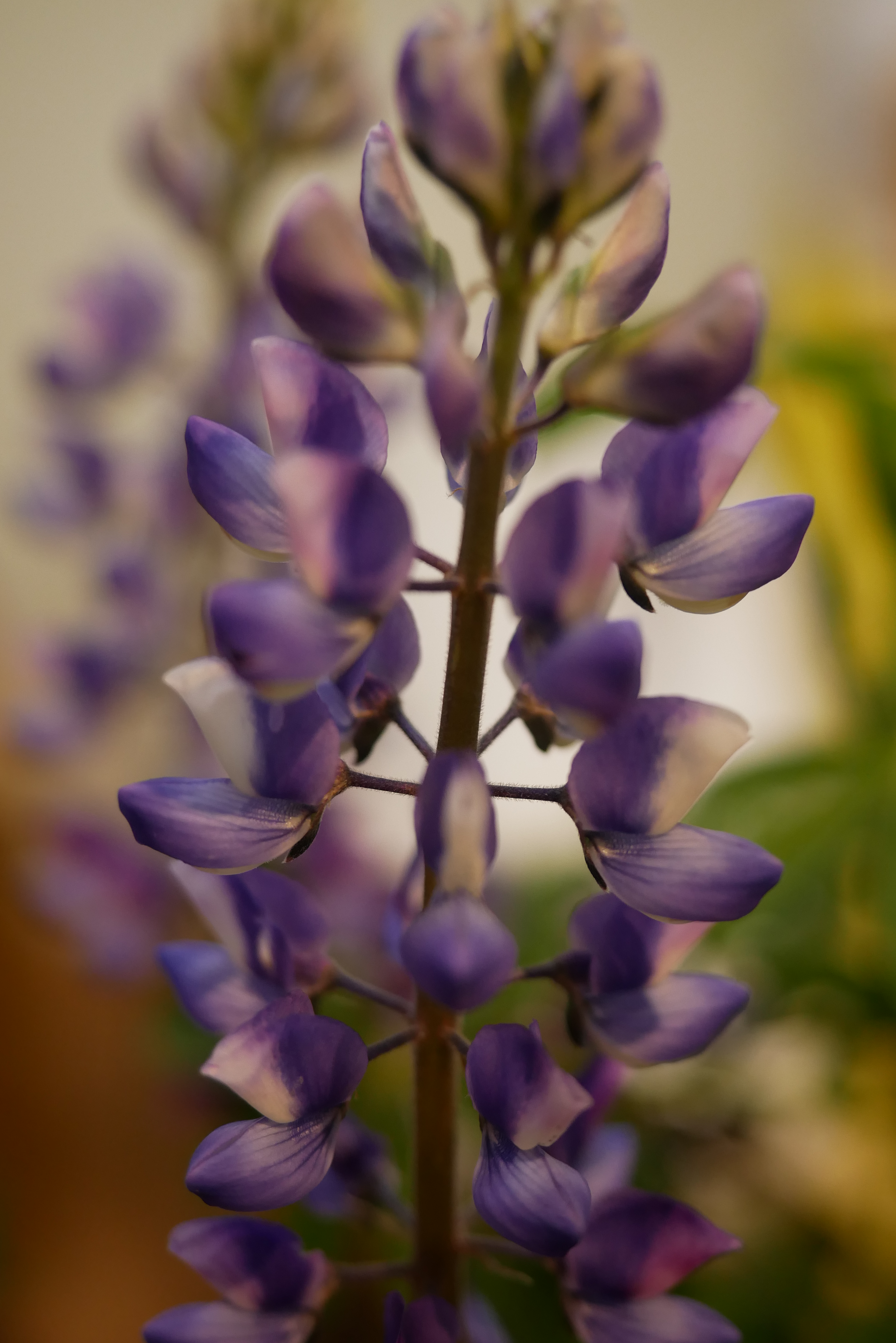
Lupinus succulentus (arroyo lupine succulent)

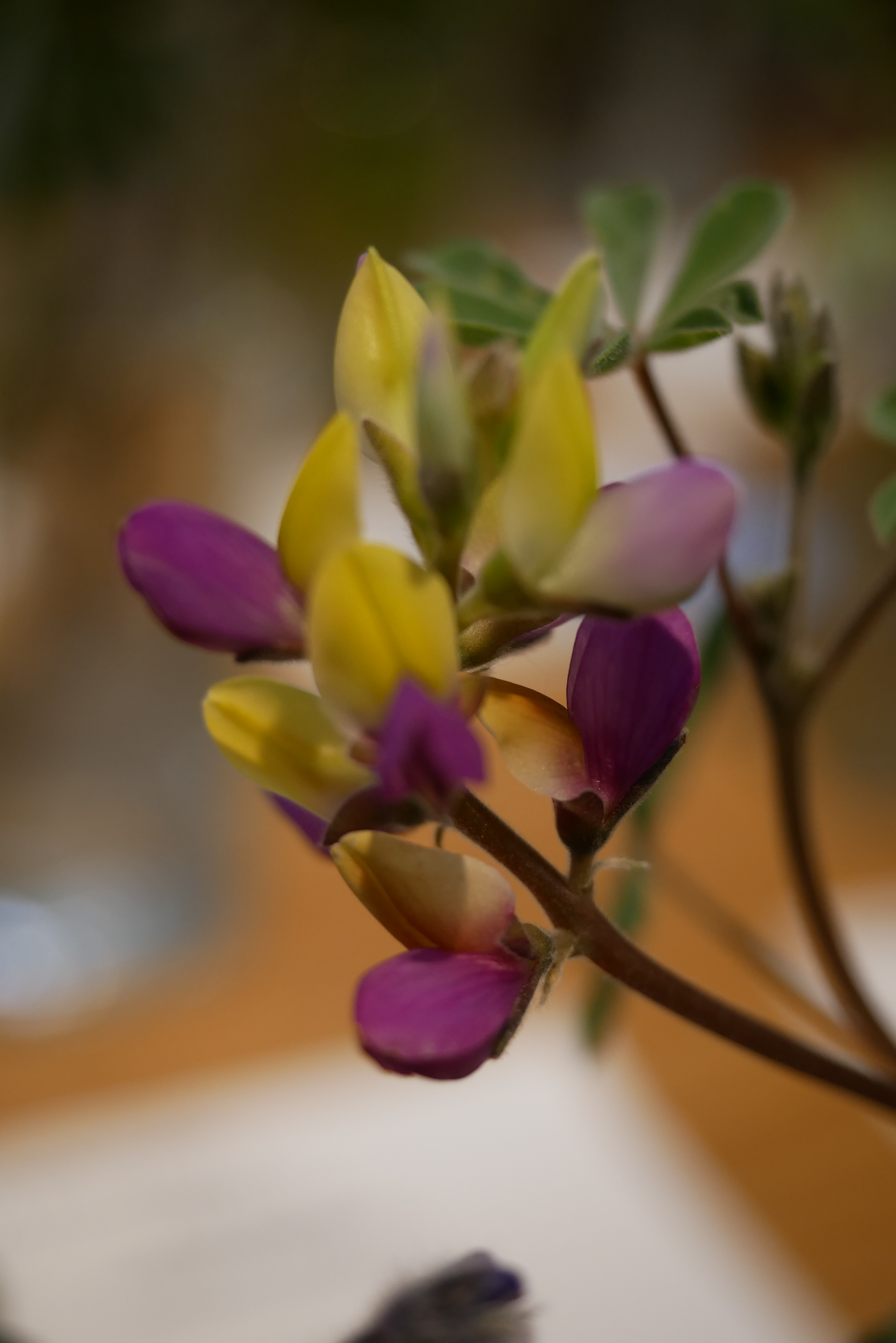
Lupinus stiversii (harlequin lupine)

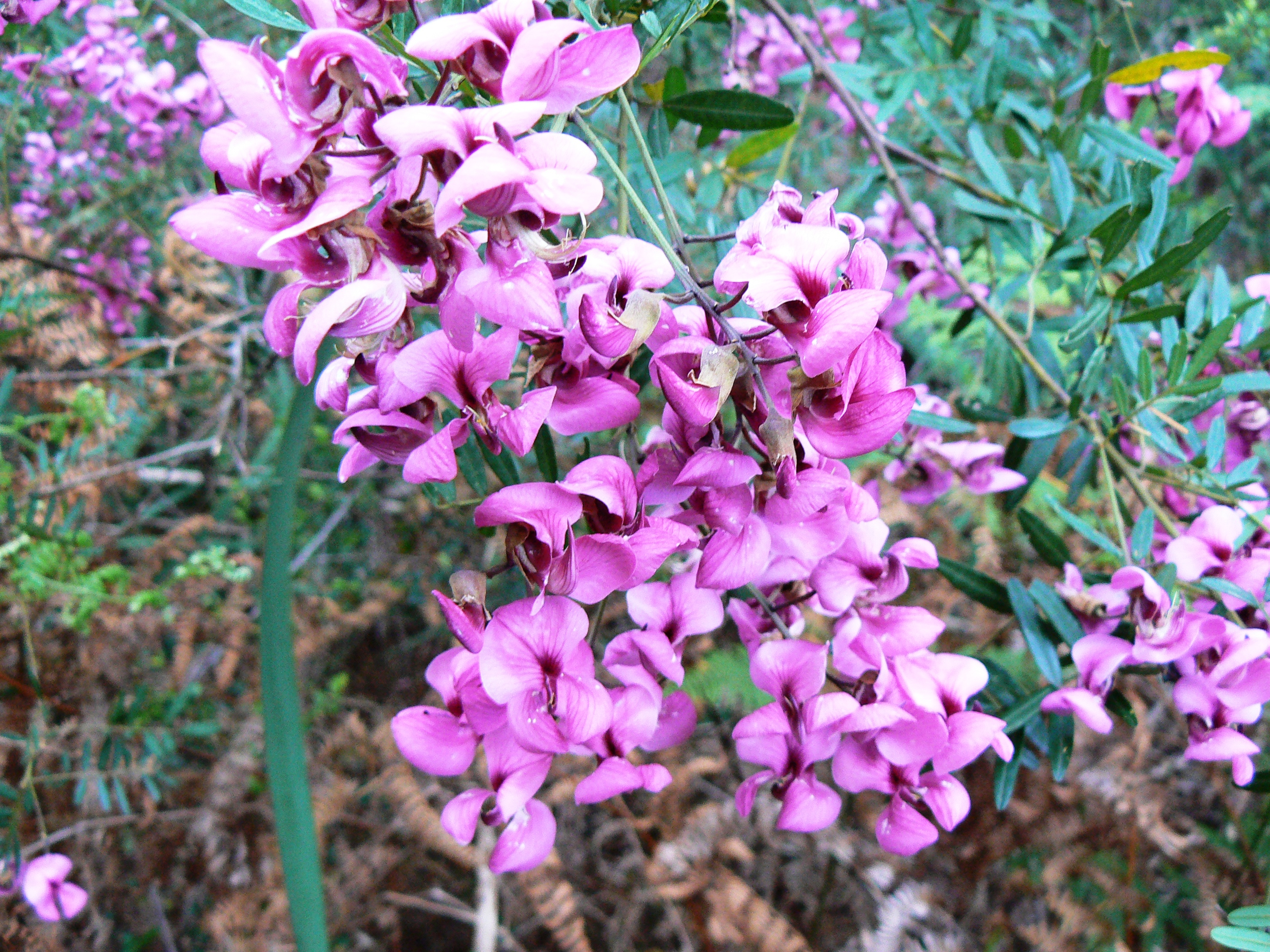
Virgilia oroboides (Cape lilac) mauve flowers

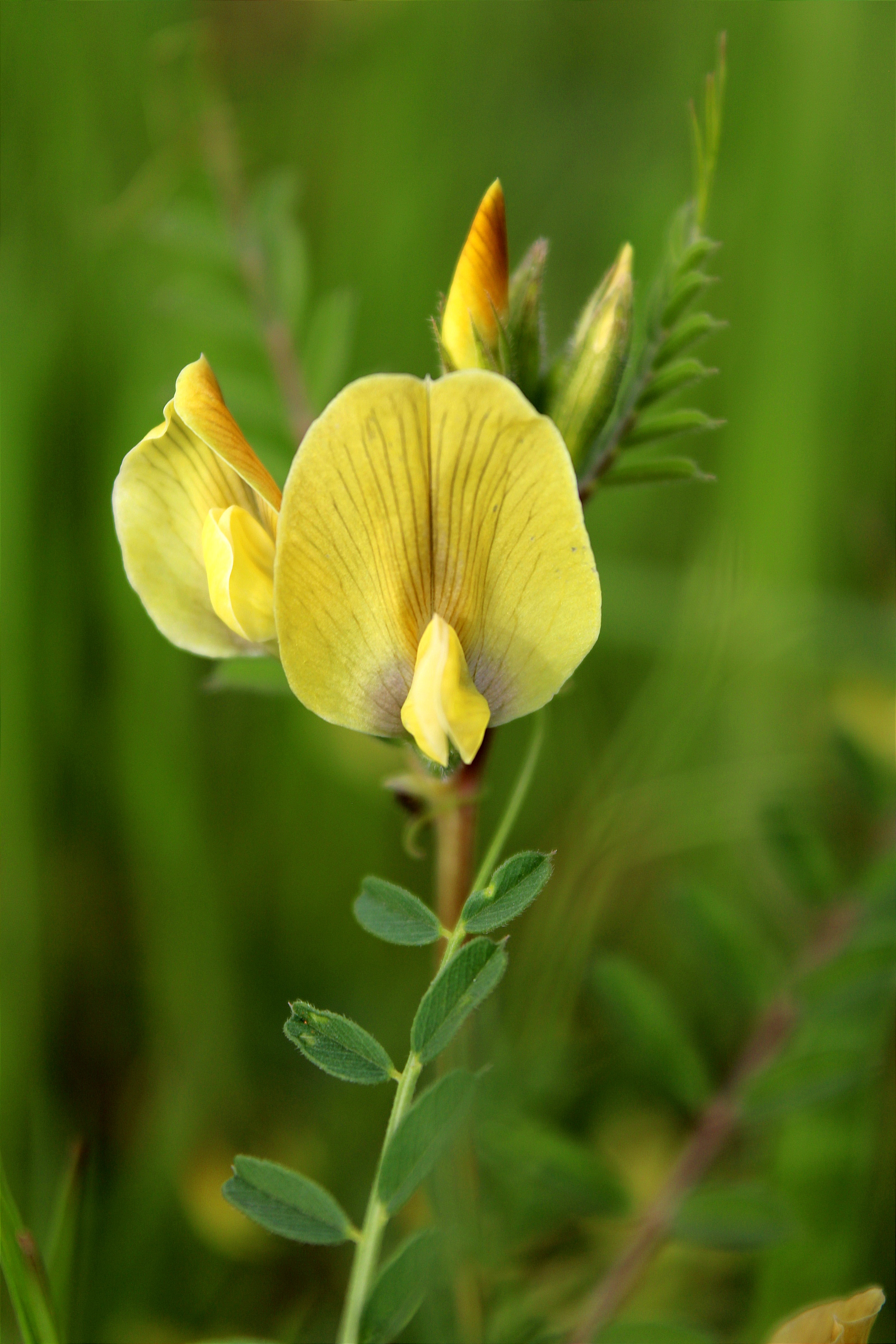
Vicia grandiflora
