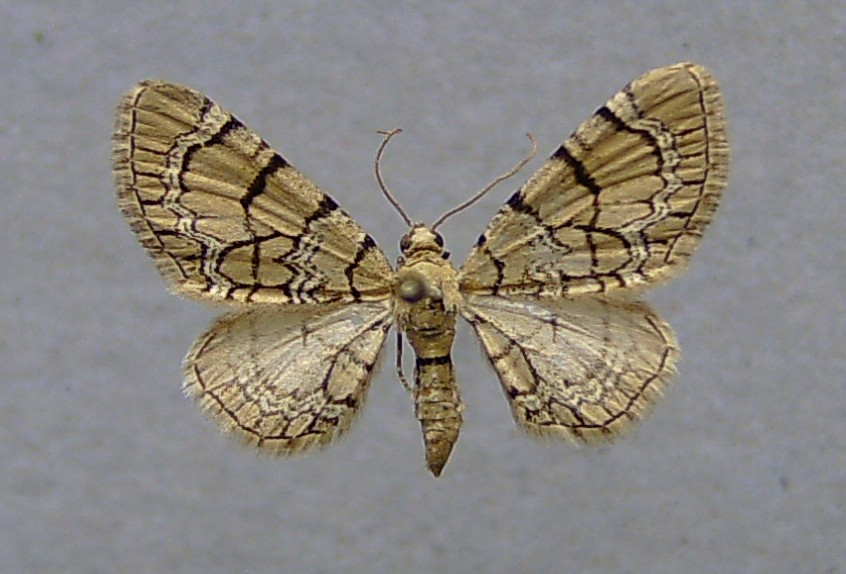

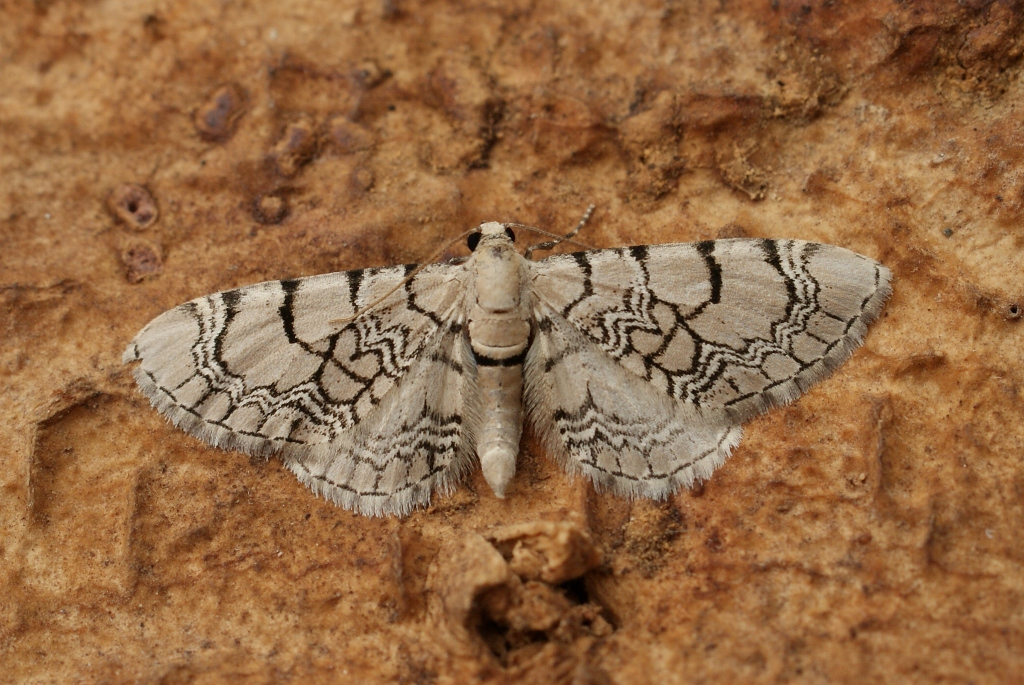

Scientific classification
- Kingdom: Animalia
- Phylum: Arthropoda
- Clade: Pancrustacea
- Class: Insecta
- Order: Lepidoptera
- Family: Geometridae
- Genus: Eupithecia
- Species: E. venosata

Binomial name
- Eupithecia venosata (Fabricius, 1787)

Synonyms
- List: Phalaena venosata Fabricius, 1787; Eupithecia comparanda Vojnits, 1981; Phalaena decussata Donovan, 1799; Phalaena insignata Hubner, 1789; Eupithecia grisea Dietze, 1913; Eupithecia nubilata Bohatsch, 1893; Eupithecia orcadensis Prout, 1901

= Eupithecia venosata =

Species of moth

Eupithecia venosata, the netted pug, is a moth of the family Geometridae, first described by the Danish zoologist Johan Christian Fabricius in 1787. It is found across the Palearctic realm from Portugal and Morocco in the west to the Lake Baikal in Siberia and Afghanistan and Pakistan in the east.

== Description ==
The length of the forewings is 10–14 mm. The ground colour of the forewings and hindwings is brown to creamy white The forewings are large and round. Several light, black-edged, lines and the partly black coloured veins form a characteristic lattice. The hindwings have a similar, but greatly weakened pattern. Very strongly resembles Eupithecia schiefereri and is distinguishable from this clearly only by means of a genital examination.

== Forma ==
fumosae Gregson (= nubilata Bohatsch, grisea Dietze) is a dark smoke-coloured race from the Shetland Islands. – In ab. bandanae Gregson the white bands remain conspicuous on the smoky ground. Among fumosae. – ochracae Gregson (= orcadensis Prout) also has the ground-colour darkened, but ochreous or clay-yellowish, not smoky; markings normal or sometimes weakened as in fumosae Orkney Islands. See subspecies.

The larva is pale pinkish grey, darker on the back, with scattered, upstanding brushes. The pupa is shiny brown-yellow with a dark brown cremaster, which has at the base five beaded elevations and a stretched tip with several bristles.

== Biology ==
The moth flies from April to June depending on the location.

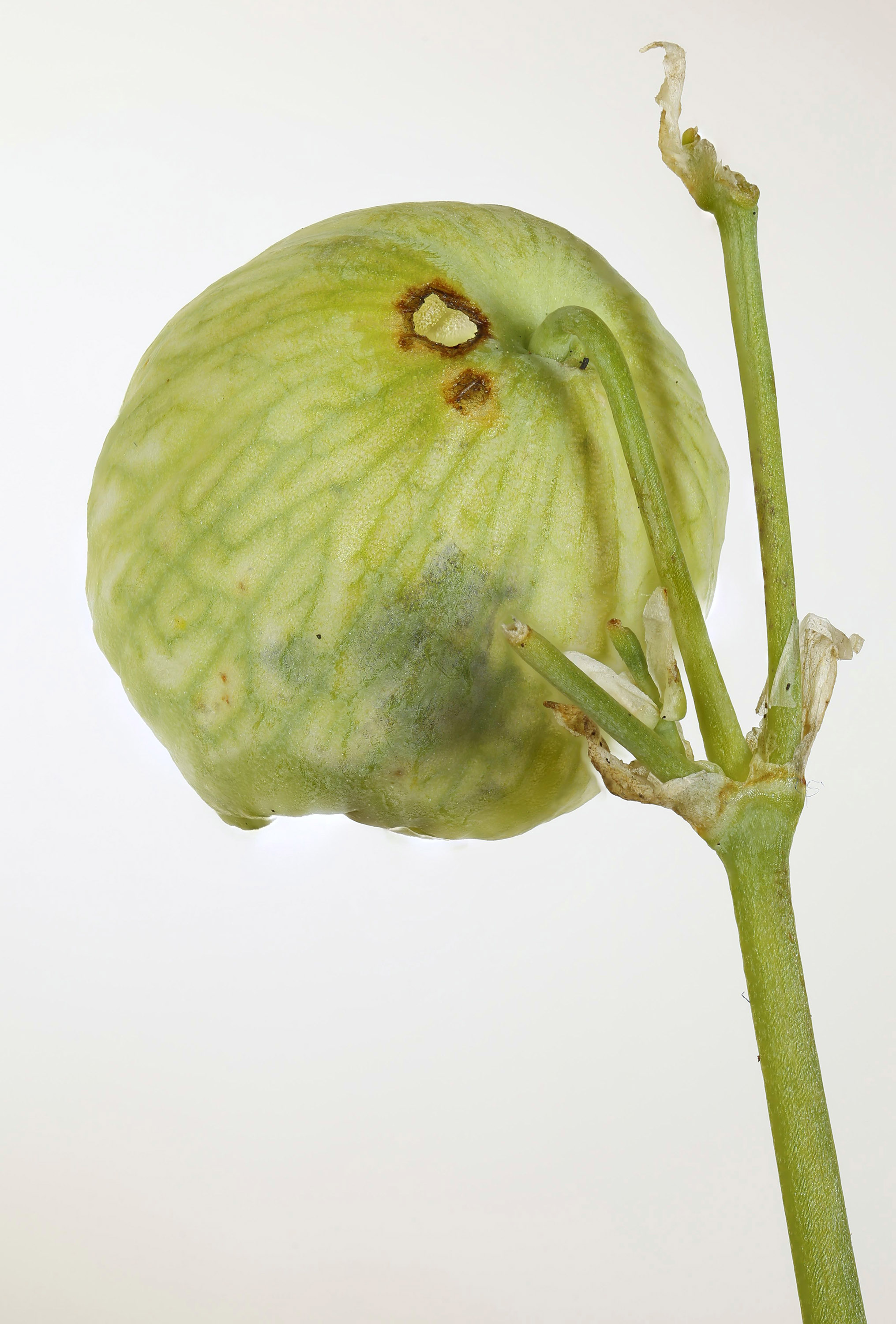
vacated calyx, Bagillt, North Wales, July 2016

The larvae feed spun up on campion (Silene species), preferably bladder campion (Silene vulgaris), red campion (Silene dioica) and sea campion (Silene maritima).The pupa hibernates sometimes for two winters

== Subspecies ==
- Eupithecia venosata venosata
- Eupithecia venosata fumosae Gregson, 1887
- Eupithecia venosata hebridensis Curtis, 1944
- Eupithecia venosata ochracae Gregson, 1886
- Eupithecia venosata plumbea Huggins, 1962
