= Pogochaetia solitaria =

Scientific classification
- Domain: Eukaryota
- Kingdom: Animalia
- Phylum: Arthropoda
- Class: Insecta
- Order: Lepidoptera
- Family: Gelechiidae
- Genus: Pogochaetia
- Species: P. solitaria

Binomial name
- Pogochaetia solitaria Staudinger, 1880

Synonyms
- Pogochaetia solitaria cabreretsi Povolný, 1981; Gelechia ocymoidella Walsingham, 1900

Species of moth

Pogochaetia solitaria is a moth in the family Gelechiidae. It was described by Otto Staudinger in 1880. It is found in Spain, France, Italy, Switzerland, Austria, Greece, Turkey and northern Iran.

The wingspan is 15–17 mm. The forewings are blackish with reddish-grey scales and three to four large black dots. The hindwings are light grey.

The larvae feed on Saponaria ocymoides.

== Subspecies ==
- Pogochaetia solitaria solitaria (Greece, Turkey, northern Iran: Elburs mountains)
- Pogochaetia solitaria ocymoidella (Walsingham, 1900) (Spain, southern France, Alps)
