= Pogochaetia dmitrii =

Scientific classification
- Domain: Eukaryota
- Kingdom: Animalia
- Phylum: Arthropoda
- Class: Insecta
- Order: Lepidoptera
- Family: Gelechiidae
- Genus: Pogochaetia
- Species: P. dmitrii

Binomial name
- Pogochaetia dmitrii Bidzilya, 2005

Species of moth

Pogochaetia dmitrii is a moth in the family Gelechiidae. It was described by Oleksiy V. Bidzilya in 2005. It is found in the Altai Mountains in Central Asia.
