= Saponaria jagelii =

Conservation status
- Critically Endangered (IUCN 3.1)

Scientific classification
- Kingdom: Plantae
- Clade: Tracheophytes
- Clade: Angiosperms
- Clade: Eudicots
- Order: Caryophyllales
- Family: Caryophyllaceae
- Genus: Saponaria
- Species: S. jagelii

Binomial name
- Saponaria jagelii Phitos & Greuter

Species of flowering plant

Saponaria jagelii is a species of flowering plant in the family Caryophyllaceae. It is endemic to the island of Elafonisos in Greece. Its natural habitat is dune vegetation. It is threatened by habitat loss.
