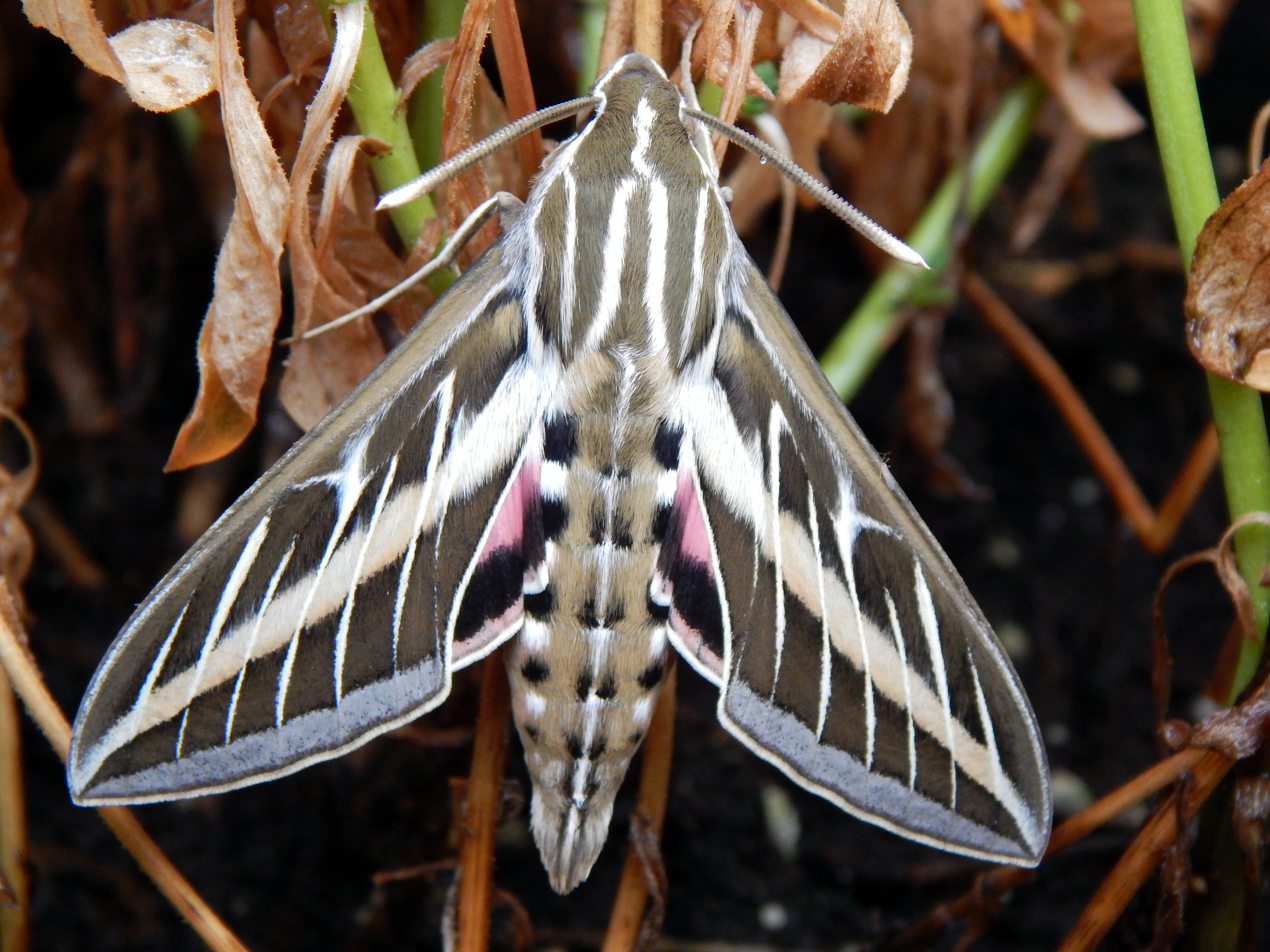
- Adult
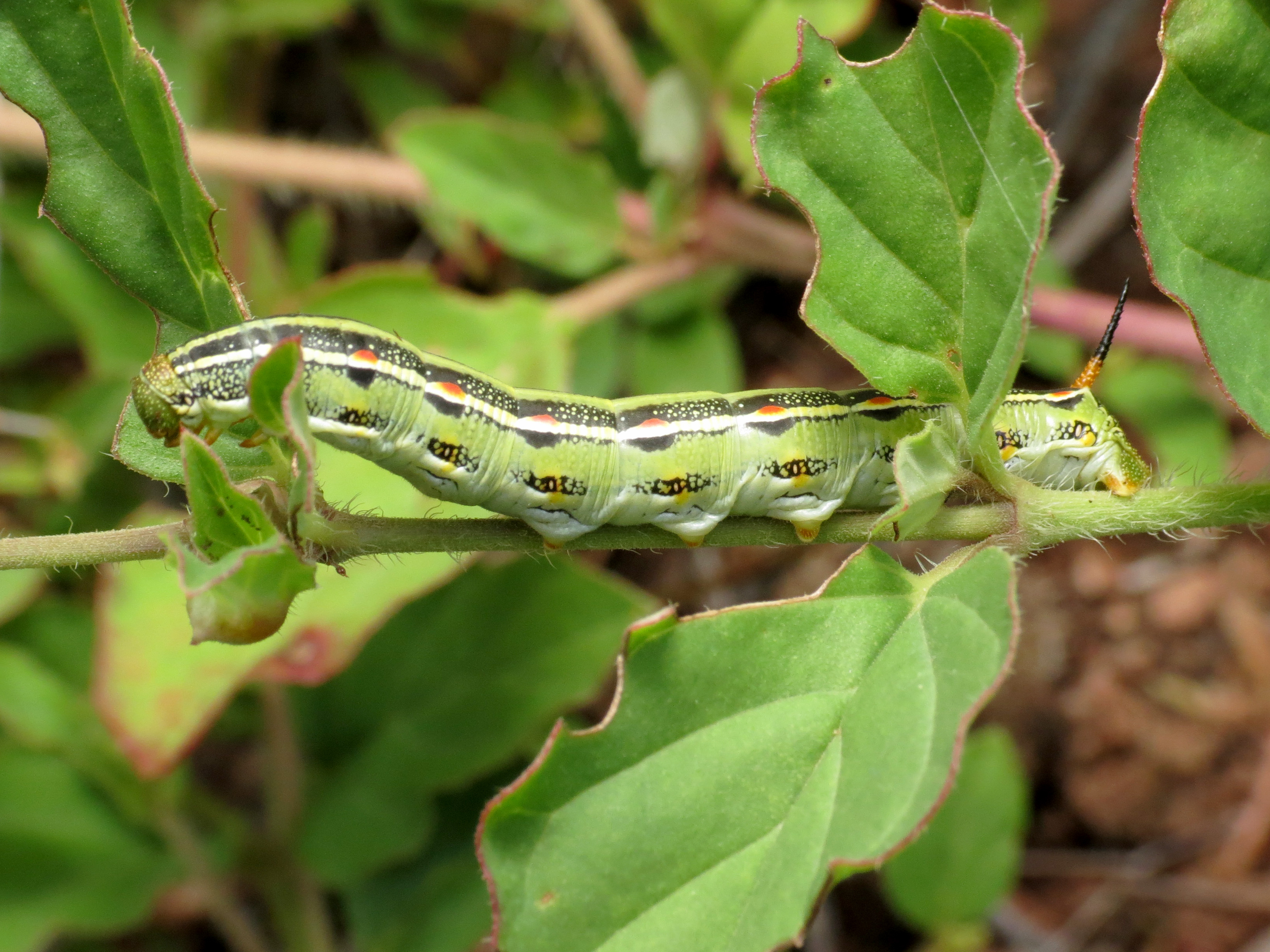
- The caterpillar varies widely in coloration, from black with stripes to green with red spots.

Conservation status
- Secure (NatureServe)

Scientific classification
- Kingdom: Animalia
- Phylum: Arthropoda
- Clade: Pancrustacea
- Class: Insecta
- Order: Lepidoptera
- Family: Sphingidae
- Genus: Hyles
- Species: H. lineata

Binomial name
- Hyles lineata (Fabricius, 1775)

Synonyms
- List: Sphinx lineata Fabricius, 1775; Celerio lineata; Deilephila lineata; Sphinx daucus Cramer, [1777]; Sphinx lineata americana Laporte, 1830; Celerio lineata florilega Kernbach, 1962; Celerio lineata lineatoides Gehlen, 1934

= Hyles lineata =

White-lined sphinx

Species of moth

Hyles lineata, also known as the white-lined sphinx moth, is a moth of the family Sphingidae. They are sometimes known as a "hummingbird moth" because of their bird-like size (2–3 inch wingspan) and flight patterns.

As caterpillars, they have a wide range of color phenotypes but show consistent adult coloration. With a wide geographic range throughout Central and North America, H. lineata is known to feed on many different host plants as caterpillars and pollinate a variety of flowers as adults.

Larvae are powerful eaters and are known to form massive groupings capable of damaging crops and gardens. As adults, they use both visual and olfactory perception to locate plants from which they collect nectar.

== Distribution ==
Hyles lineata is one of the most abundant hawk moths in North America and has a very wide geographic range. This range extends from Central America to southern Canada through Mexico and most of the United States. Some regions of South Asia like Sindh, Pakistan are reported to have habitats for these moths. They can also be found occasionally in the West Indies. Rarely, specimens have also been reported in Eurasia and Africa.

The abundance of Hyles lineata populations in specific locations varies significantly from year to year, and has been thought to influence selection on flower phenotypes, although studies throughout the years show mixed results.

== Description ==
=== Adult ===
The forewing is dark brown with a tan stripe which extends from the base to the apex. There are also white lines that cover the veins. The black hindwing has a broad pink median band. It has a wingspan of 2 to 3 inches. This moth is large and has a stout furry body. The dorsal hind region is crossed by six distinct white stripes and similar striping patterns on the wings. The hindwings are black with a thick, red-pink stripe in the middle.

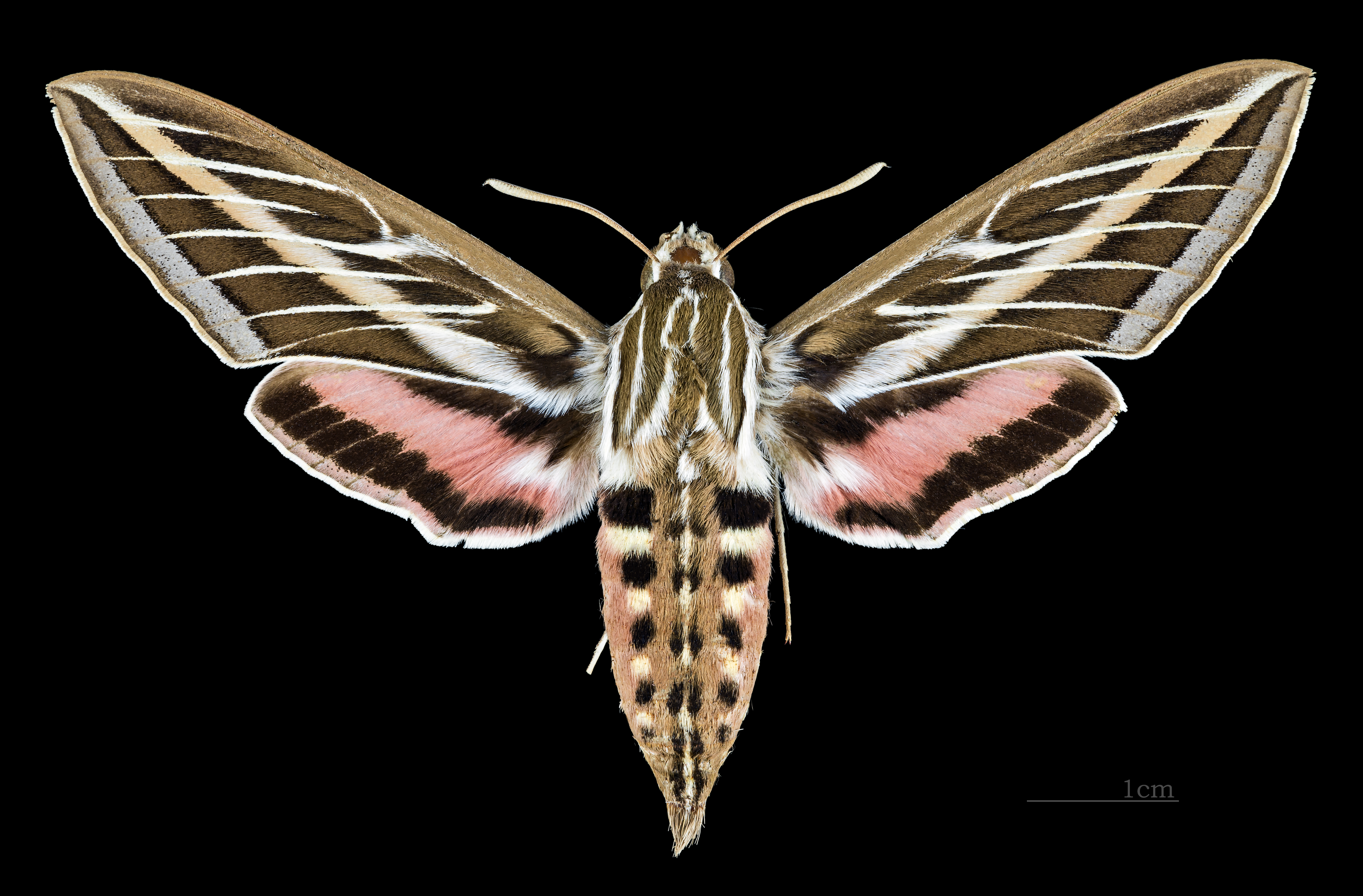
Female dorsal

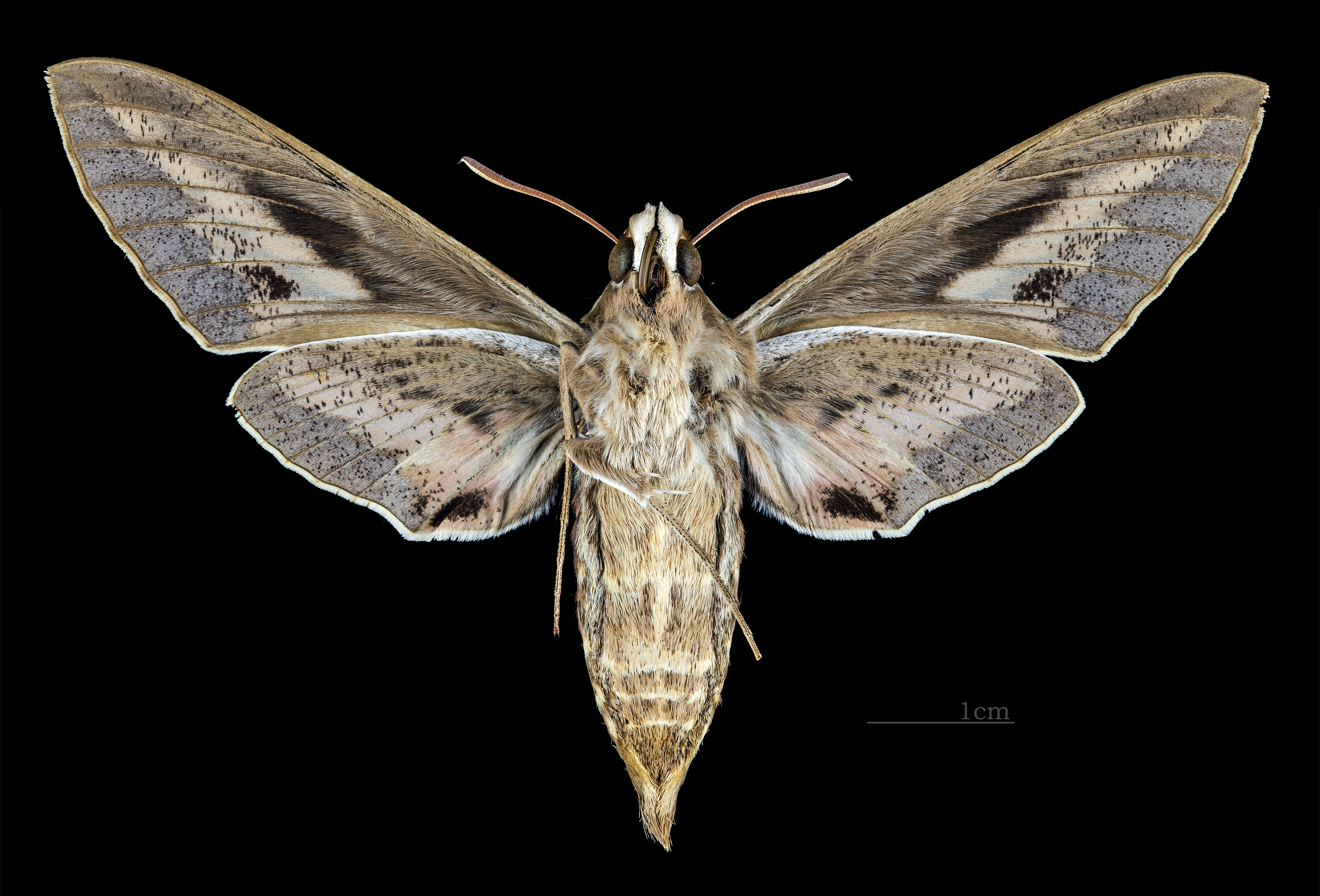
Female ventral

=== Larva ===
Larvae show wide variation in color. The larvae are black with orange spots arranged in lines down the whole body. Their head's prothoracic shield, and the anal plate, are one color, either green or orange with small black dots. A tail-like spine protruding from the back of the body is a typical for sphingid moth caterpillars, known as “hornworms”. This horn, which may sometimes be yellow and have a black tip, is not a stinger, and the caterpillars are not harmful to humans. The larvae can also sometimes be lime green and black.

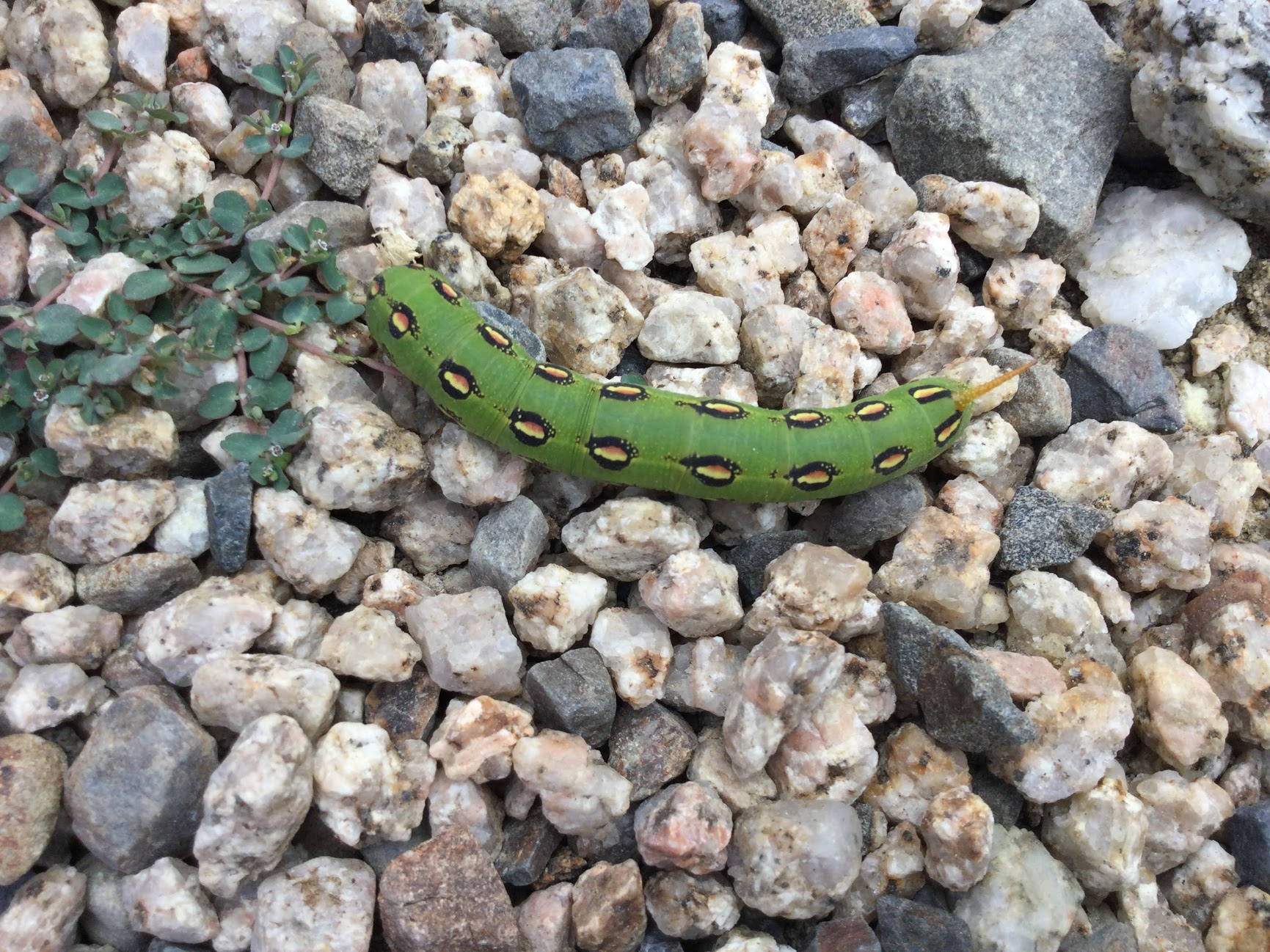
Dark green larva

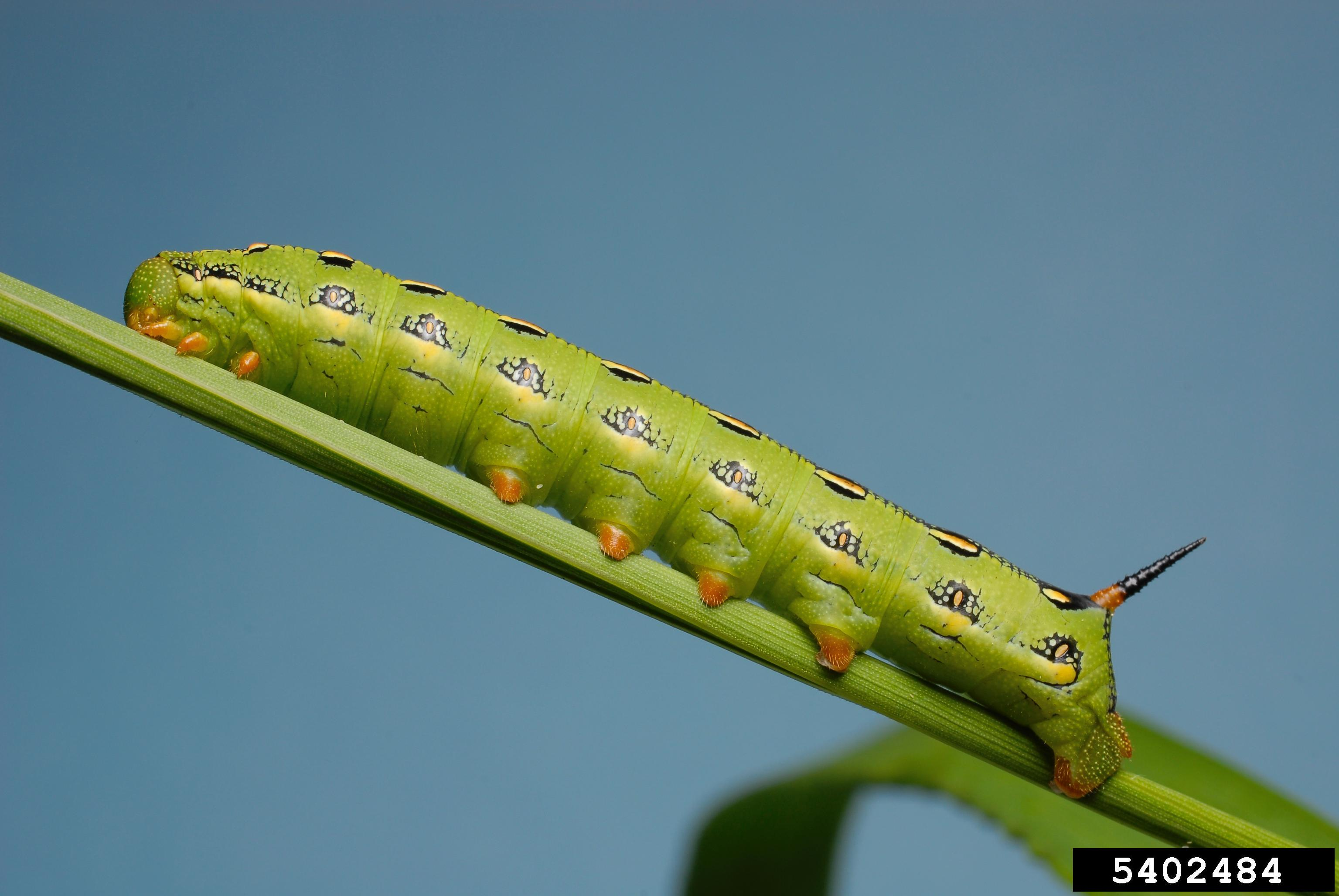
Light green larva in Colorado

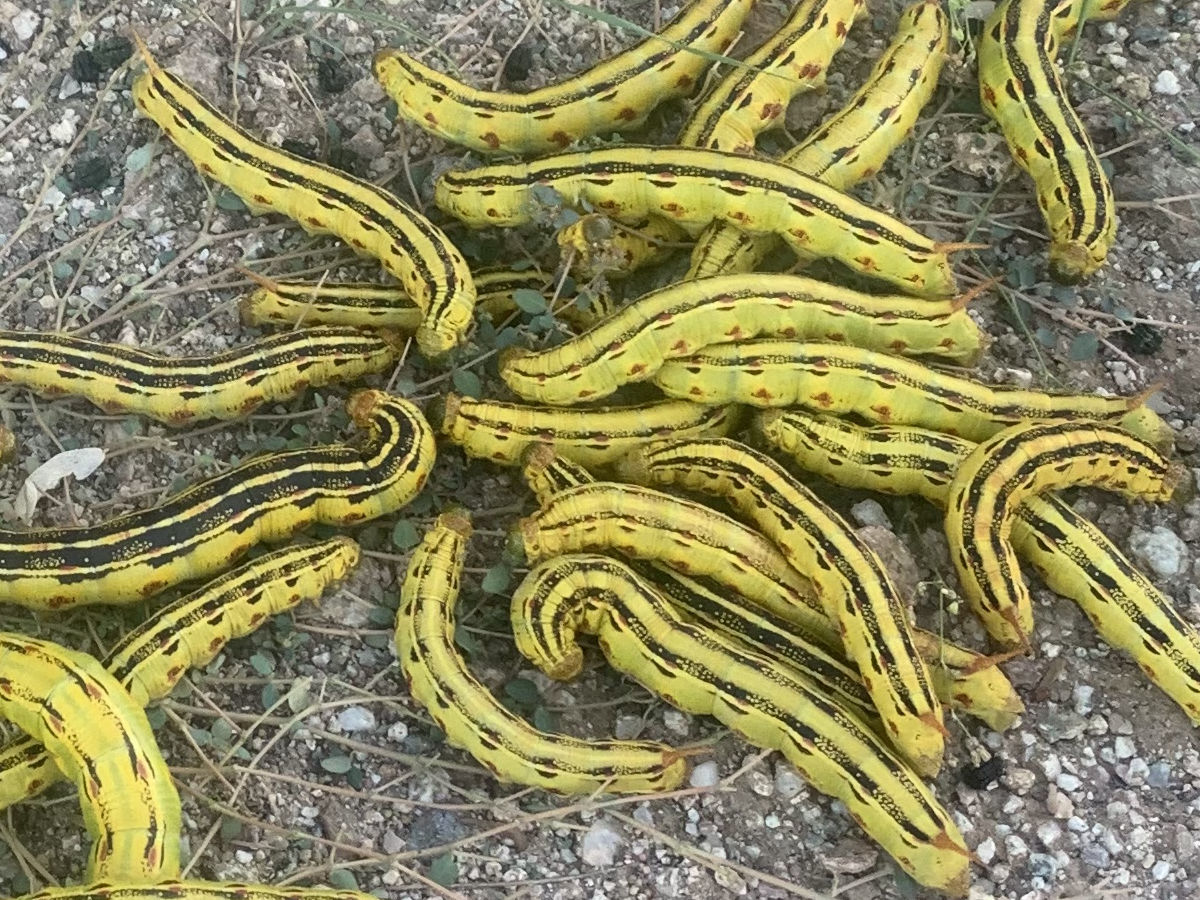
Yellow larvae in Arizona

== Habitat ==
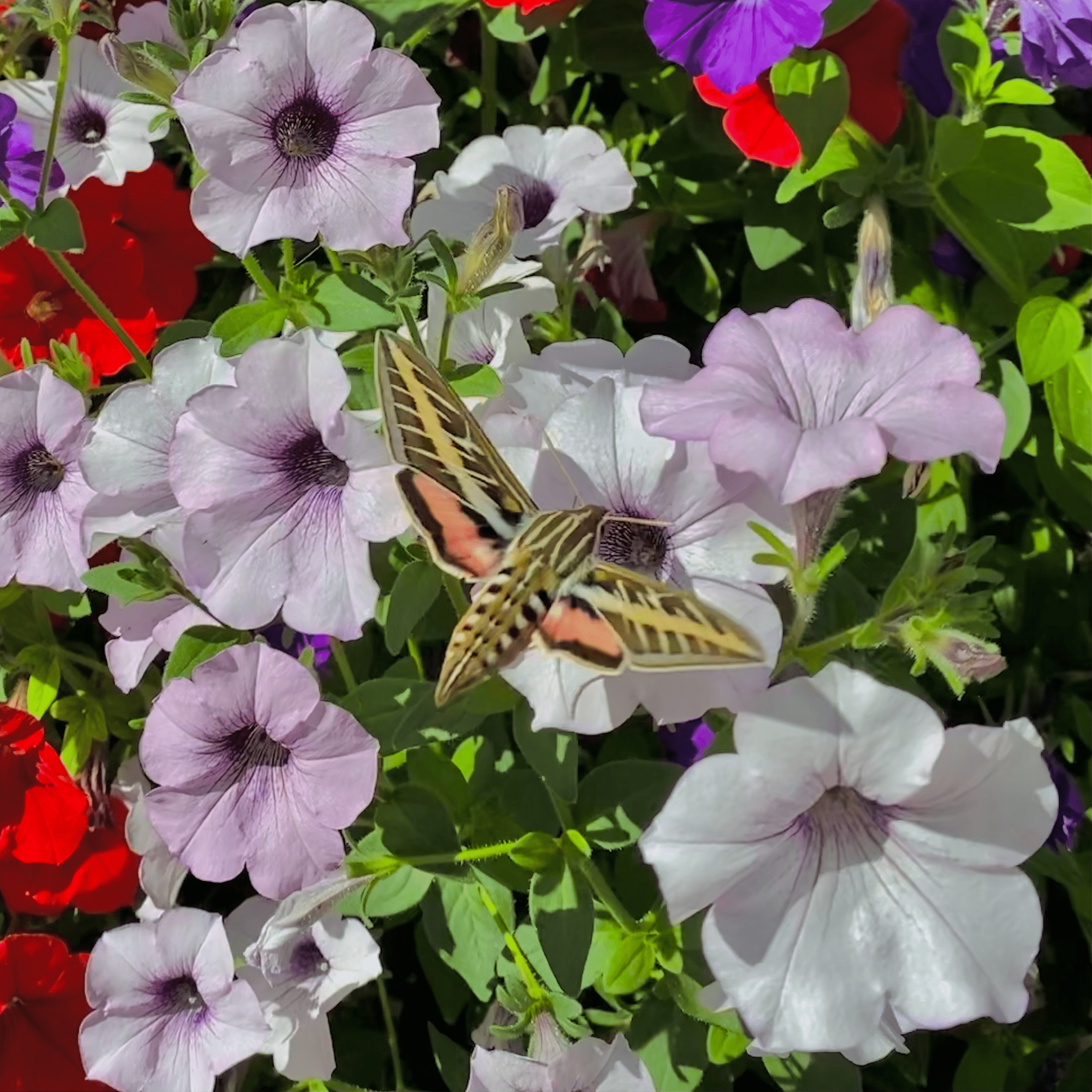
Hovering over petunias, in Vail Village, Colorado

With such a wide geographic range, H. lineata are known to live in a variety of habitats, including deserts, gardens and suburbs. They have also been seen in abundance in the mountains of Colorado, but their presence varies from year to year in many places.

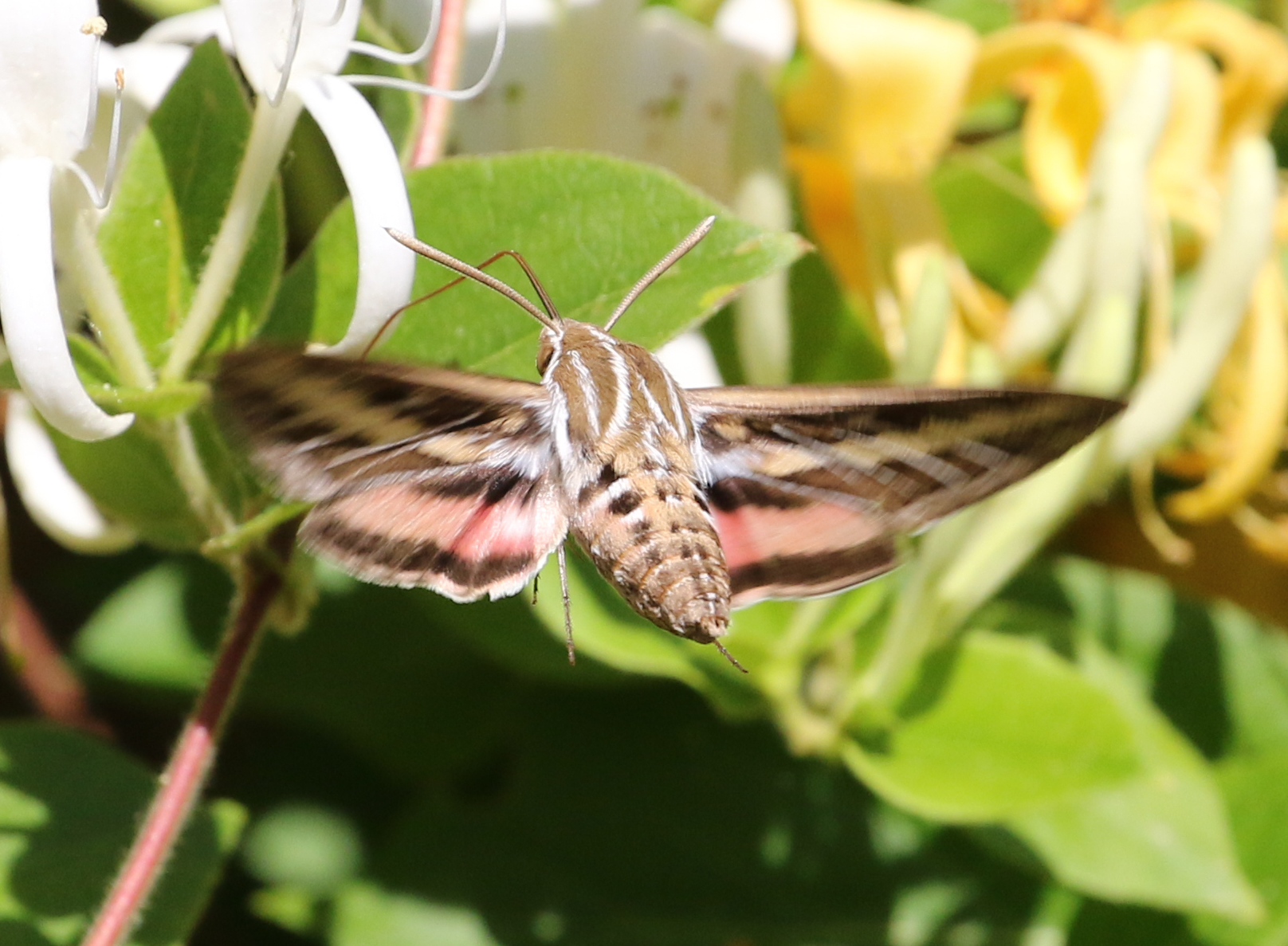
Hovering over honeysuckle, in Fort Collins, Colorado

== Food resources ==
=== Caterpillars ===
- Willow weed (Epilobium)
- Four o'clock (Mirabilis)
- Apple (Malus)
- Evening primrose (Oenothera)
- Elm (Ulmus)
- Grape (Vitis)
- Tomato (Solanum)
- Purslane (Portulaca)
- Fuchsia
- Clarkia

=== Adults ===
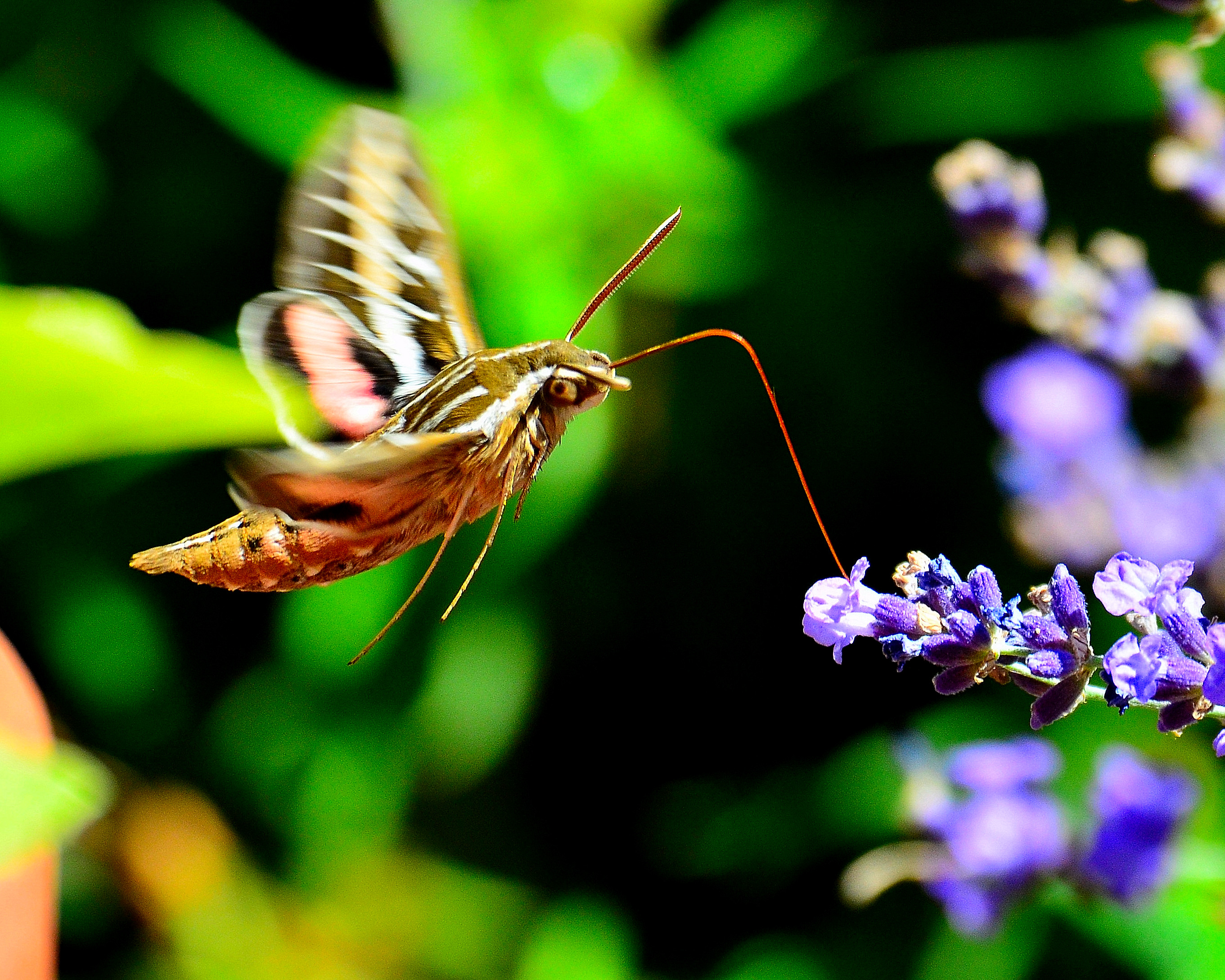
Feeding on lavender

- Columbines
- Larkspurs
- Four o'clock (Mirabilis)
- Petunia
- Honeysuckle
- Moonvine
- Bouncing bet
- Lilac
- Clovers
- Thistles
- Jimson weed
- Trumpet Vine
- Zinnia

The adults will feed on different flowers depending on time of day. If at night, they will choose flowers that are white or pale colored, which are easier to identify in contrast to the dark foliage surrounding the flower. If during daylight, they will choose flowers that are more brightly colored.

== Behavior ==
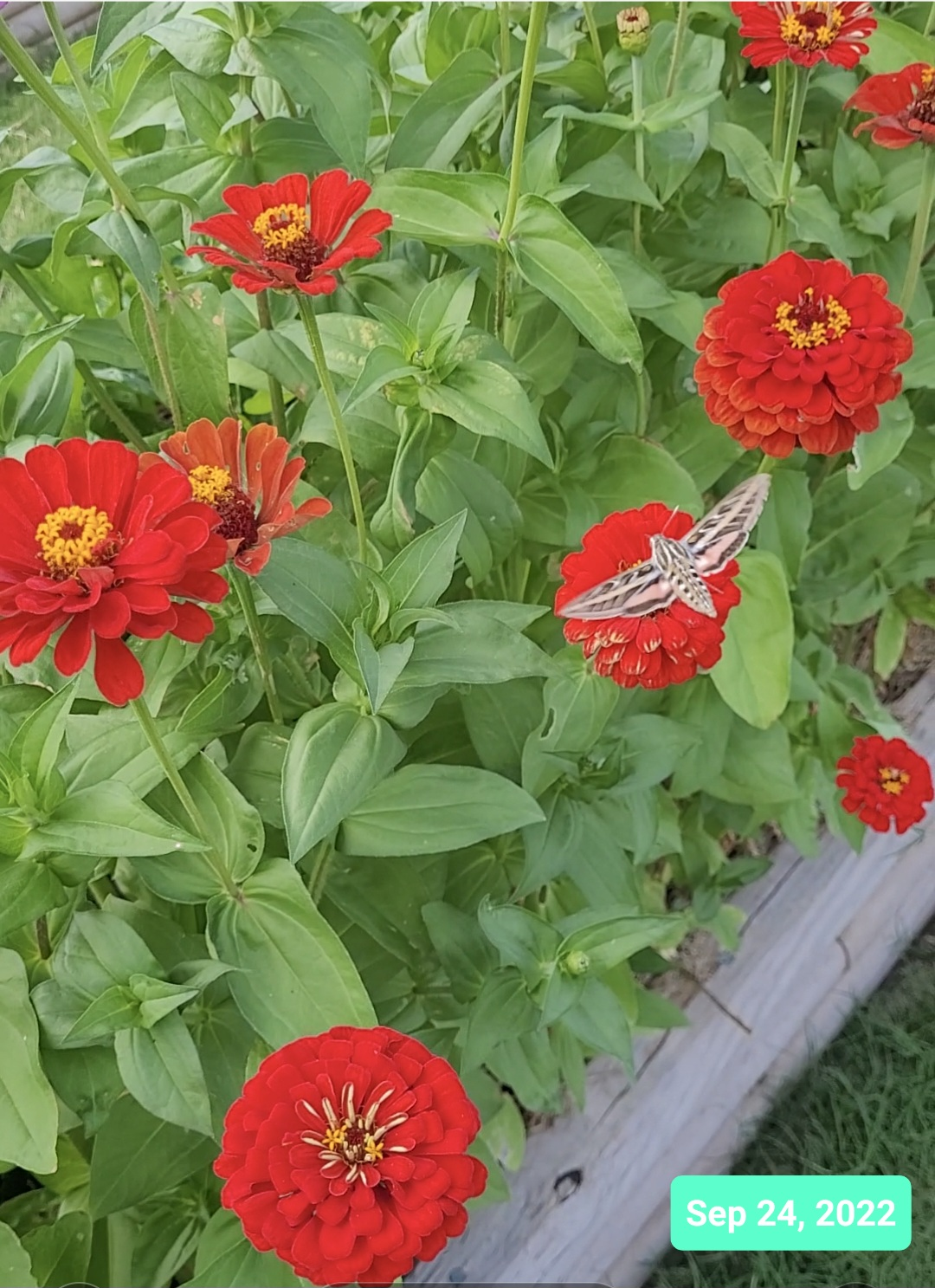
Feeding from Zinnia, at Tulsa County, Oklahoma, USA

The foraging patterns of H. lineata varies according to altitude, temperature and other factors, all of which are highly variable over its vast geographic distribution.

Hyles lineata prefer flying at night but also sometimes fly during the day. They are most commonly seen at dusk and dawn.

=== Pollination ===
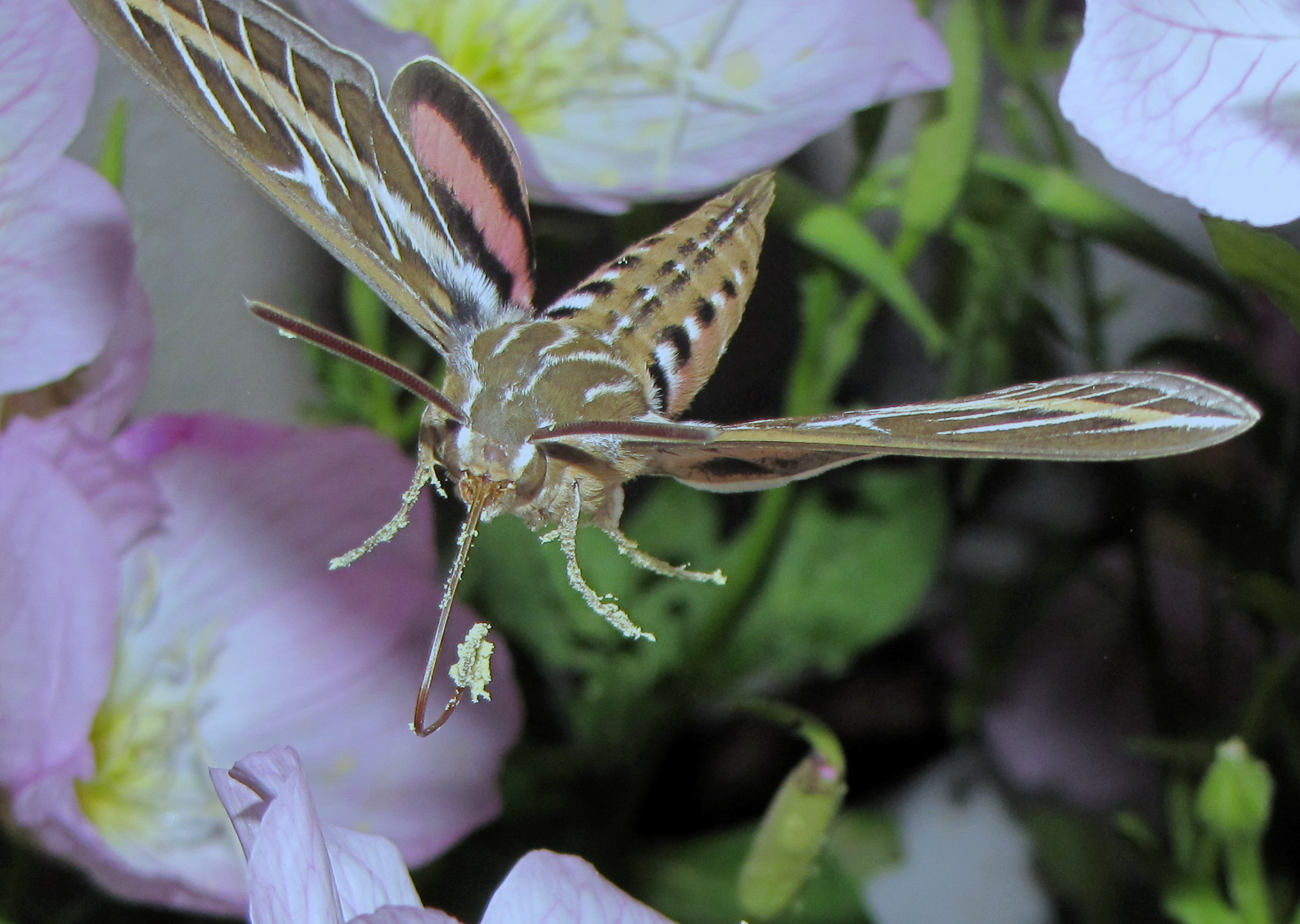
Covered in pollen after feeding from evening primroses

H. lineata are common pollinators and are known to collect nectar from flowers. As caterpillars they feed on a huge diversity of host plants and as adults they prefer nectar over flowers. A study from the 1970s focused on H. lineata nectar feeding patterns in Emerald Lake, Colorado, specifically on Aquilegia coerulea flowers. Of the H. lineata individuals that had visited A. coerulea flowers, two groups of moths were identified, one with patches of pollen near their eyes and ones with no detectable pollen on their bodies. Between the two groups, tongue length was significantly different, with longer-tongued individuals having no pollen and shorter-tongued individuals having pollen. These results suggest that within H. lineata, some individuals are effective pollinators while some are not pollinating at all, with shorter-tongued individuals carrying out the most effective pollination.

Other studies have investigated its role as pollinators in flower morphology. Individuals visiting Aquilegia chrysantha flowers in Pima County, AZ, had proboscis lengths very similar to the length of the nectar spur of the flower, suggesting coevolution.

Hawk moths, including H. lineata, are considered long-tongued nectar foragers, although nearly 20% of all hawk moth species have very short tongues compared to H. lineata. A 1997 study found correlations between tongue length and latitude distribution: mean tongue length declines from around 40 mm to as short as 15 mm as northern latitude increase from 0 to 50 degrees. The author speculates that tongues have lengthened in hawk moths of extratropical regions where it is more difficult and energetically costly to find larval food plants that are often inconspicuous, thus they need to take up more nectar at once to fuel their longer flights. Conversely, in more northern regions, short tongues are sufficient because finding larval food plants is an easier task and they do not need to take up as much nectar to fuel their flights.

One 2009 study showed that whiter flowers are associated with an annual presence of hawk moths, including H. lineata. Their data also showed that the annual presence of H. lineata populations selects for whiter flowers. Other hawk moth species with similar range overlap, specifically Sphinx vashti, show a correlation of annual presence with longer spurs on flowers. Thus hawk moths in general have been demonstrated to impact selection on flower morphology.

== Life history ==
=== Oviposition ===
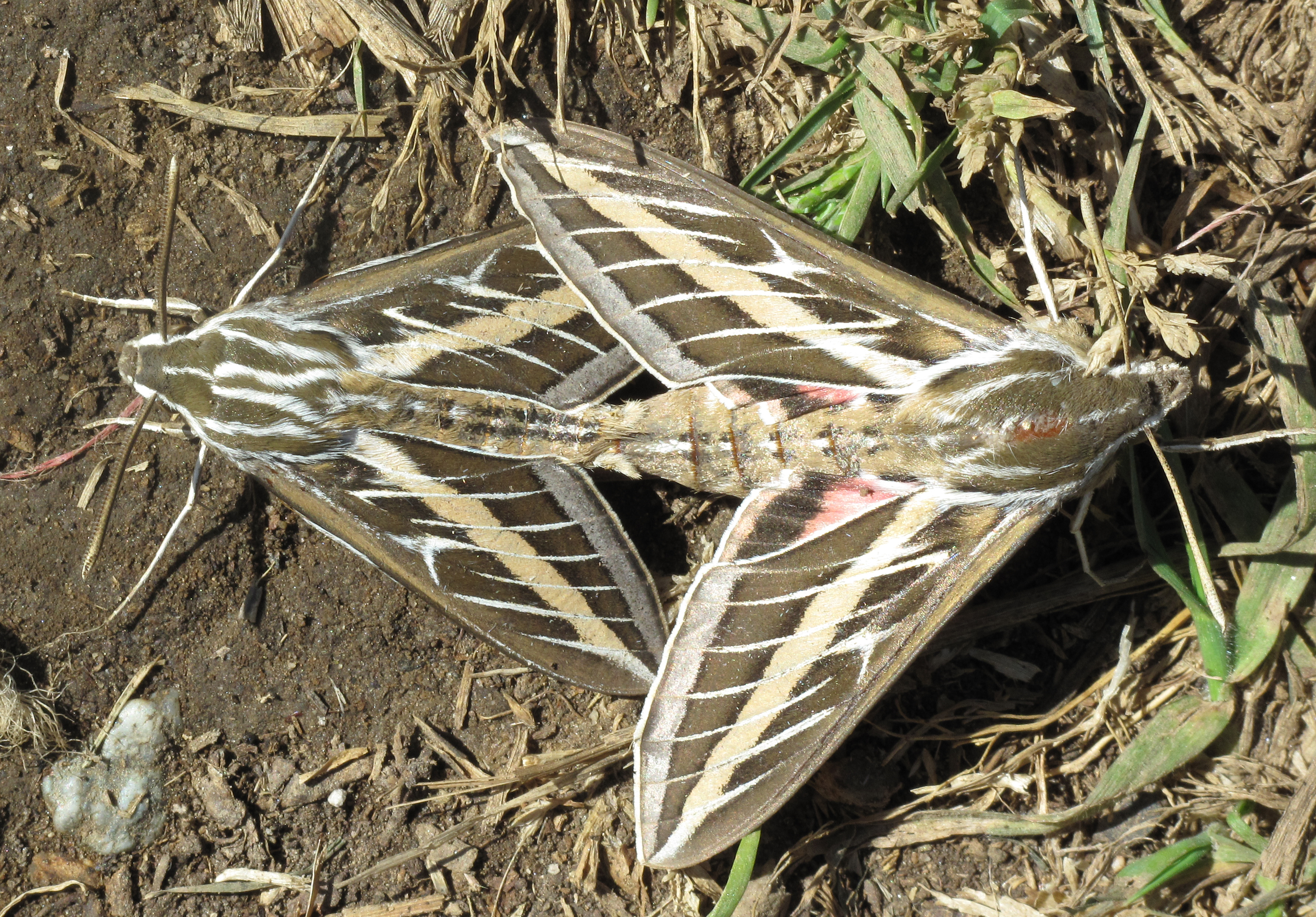
Mating

In the spring, adult females lay eggs on various types of plants, on which the resulting larvae feed. Each individual female can produce hundreds of eggs over her life.

=== Seasonality ===
Larvae overwinter and can emerge between February and November, at which point they begin to feed on a variety of host plants. Caterpillars are known to be ardent eaters. When preparing to transition into the pupal stage, caterpillars dig shallow burrows in the ground where they then stay for 2 to 3 weeks, at which point they emerge as adults. As they get closer to pupating, they will wiggle up closer to the surface which makes it easier to emerge.

Adults typically do not survive cold northern winters, but larvae overwinter and moths begin to appear in mid-May. Depending on abundance, a second flight may occur in late August or early September. Larvae are known to gather and form giant hordes in search of host plants, and they can eat entire plants, cover entire roadways and form huge slick masses as they go.

Typically there are two generations per year, but warmer climates see more generations.

== Physiology ==
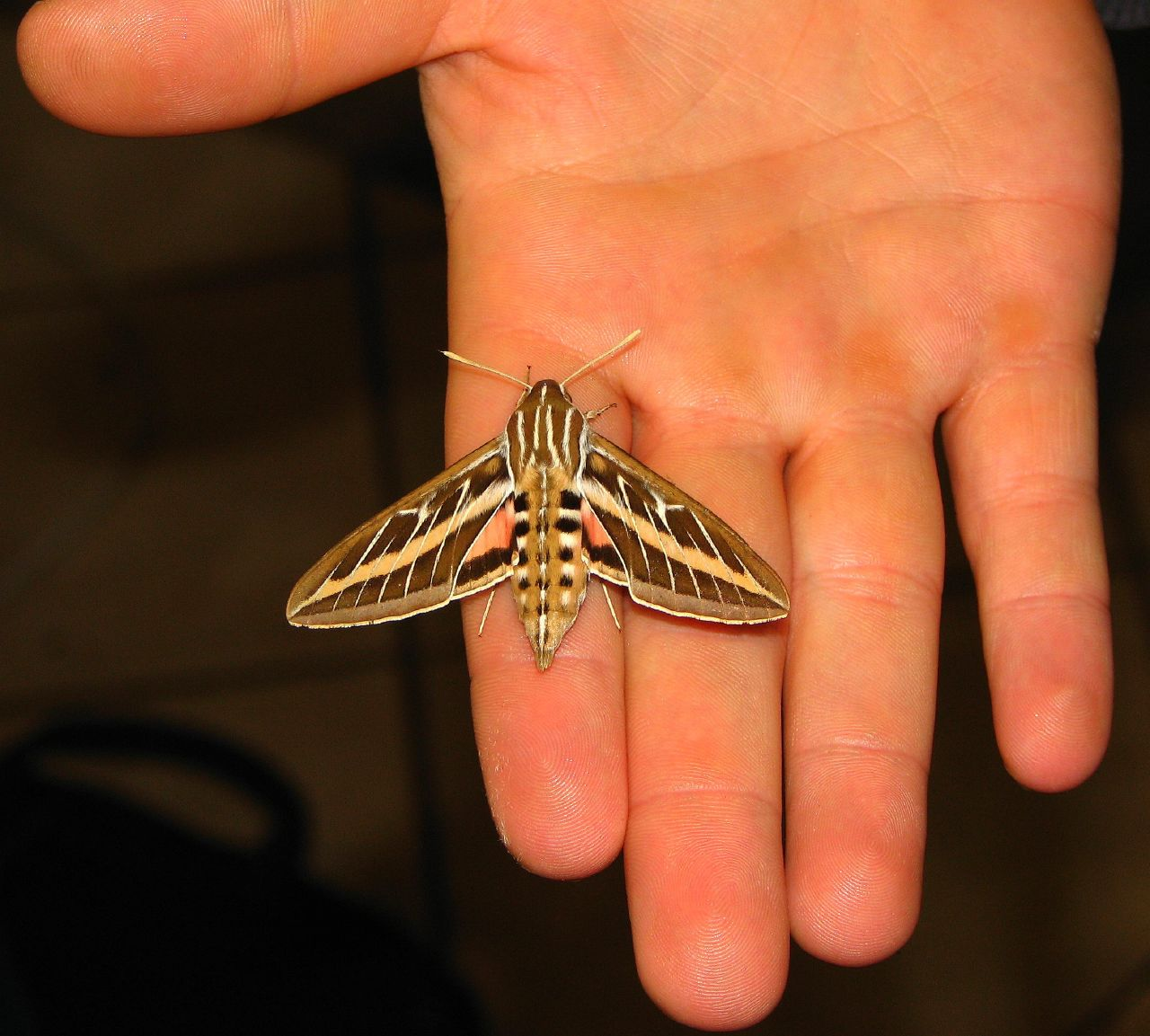
Showing size

=== Flight ===
H. lineata, when feeding, tend to hover in front of flowers and control their hovering by visual cues from the flowers.

=== Vision ===
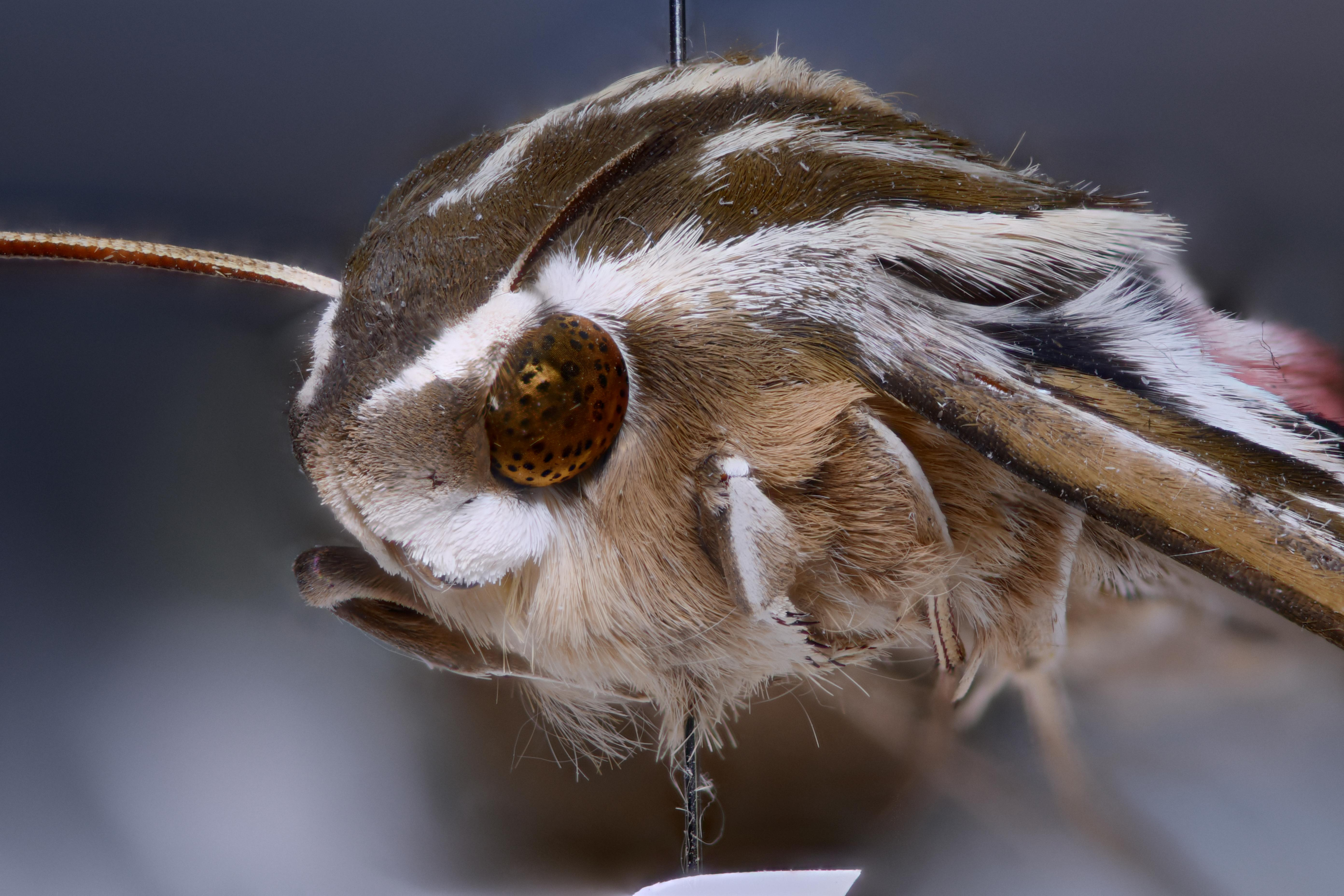
Close-up of eye & head

Though hawk moths can be both diurnal or nocturnal (or both), they all have three spectral receptors that are sensitive to blue light, green light and ultraviolet. Though it was originally assumed that hawk moths relied primarily on olfactory cues to locate flowers, due to their prevalence at particularly odorous plants, studies have shown that hawk moths actually have great vision and are very sensitive to light.

=== Olfaction ===
Though vision is a key component of H. lineata physiology, they do also have strong olfactory capabilities. They have been shown to be very sensitive to odors coming from flowers, and they have a strong ability to learn flower odors quickly.

== Interactions with humans ==
=== Food source ===
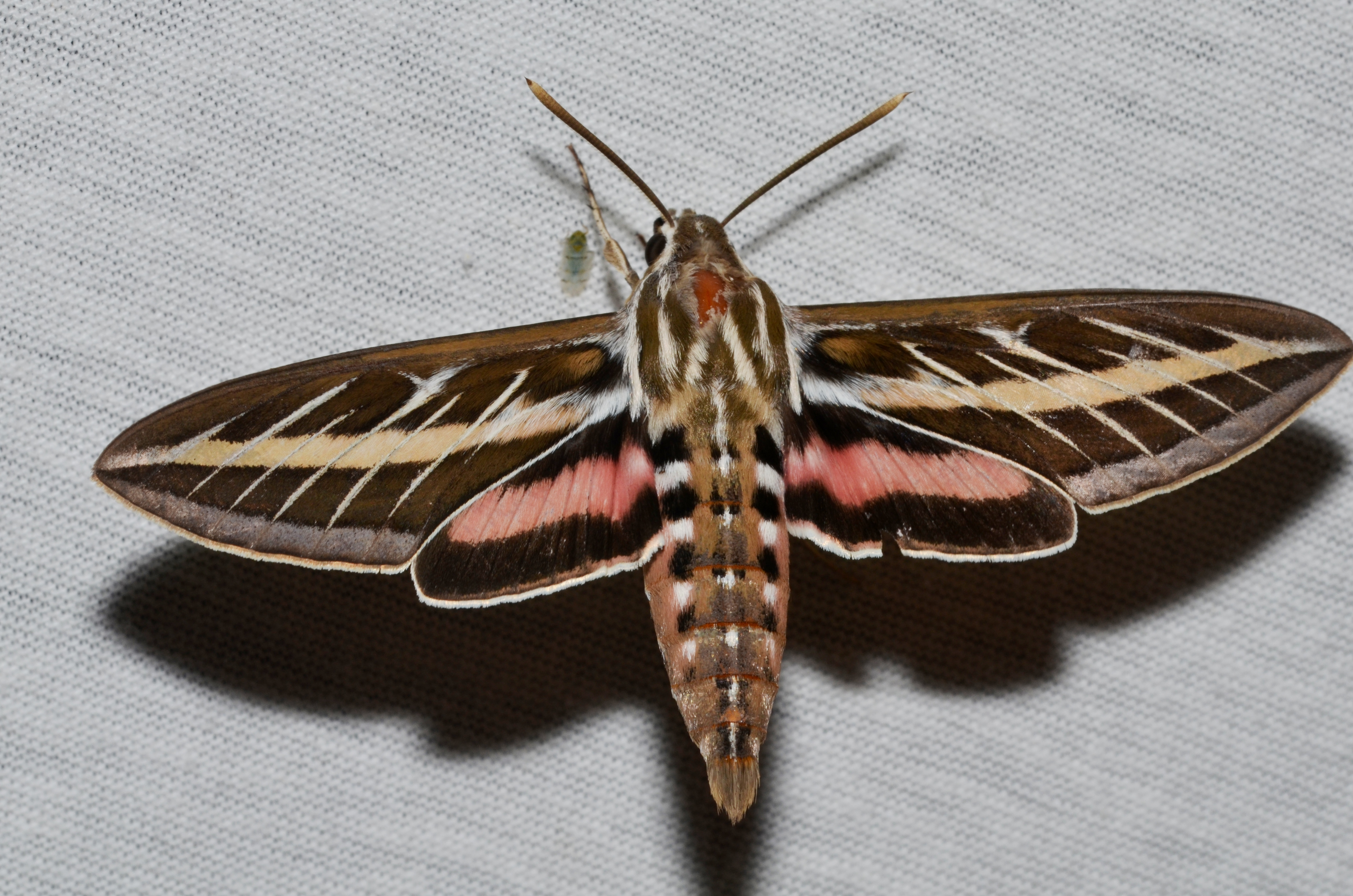
With wings spread out, in Missouri

The caterpillars have been (and in some places still are) gathered and eaten by Native Americans (e.g.,). After collection, they would be skewered and roasted for a feast, and any leftovers were stored whole or ground up after being dried. The nutritional value of the larvae has been analyzed, and found to be significant; they contain almost as much fat as hamburger meat, but have almost one-third less saturated fat, and more energy (in calories), protein, carbohydrate, riboflavin, and niacin than hamburger meat.

=== Pest of crop plants ===
Caterpillars often form massive groups in search for food. Outbreaks have been reported in Utah that have damaged grapes, tomatoes and garden crops.
