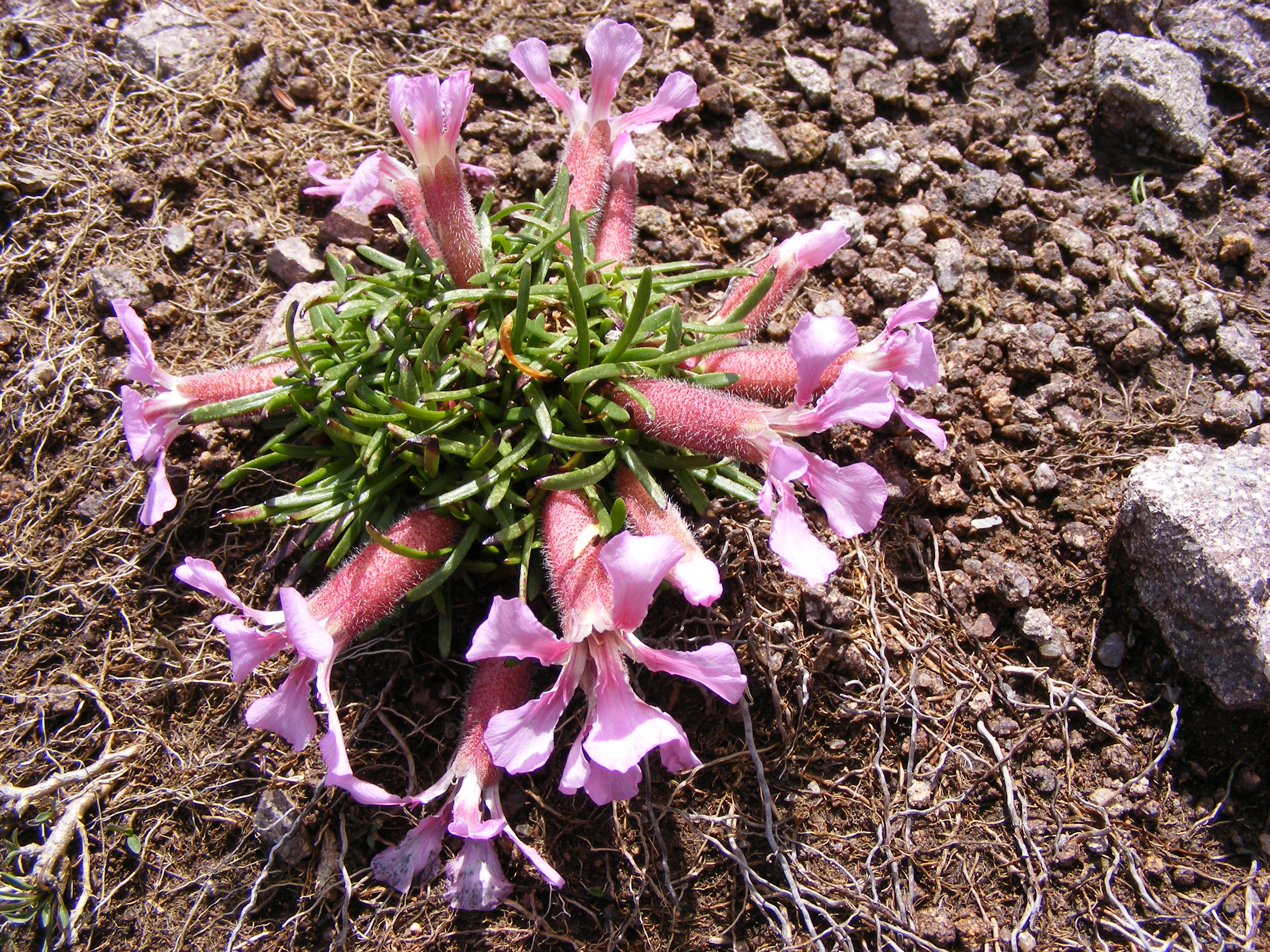

Scientific classification
- Kingdom: Plantae
- Clade: Tracheophytes
- Clade: Angiosperms
- Clade: Eudicots
- Order: Caryophyllales
- Family: Caryophyllaceae
- Genus: Saponaria
- Species: S. pumila

Binomial name
- Saponaria pumila (Janch., 1907)

Synonyms
- Behen pumilio (L.) Link; Cucubalus pumilio L.; Lychnis pumilio (L.) Scop.; Saponaria nana Fritsch; Saponaria pumilio (L.) A.Braun; Saponaria pumilio (L.) Fenzl; Saponaria pumilio (L.) Fenzl ex Janch., 1907; Silene pumila (L.) St.-Lag.; Silene pumilio (L.) Wulfen

= Saponaria pumila =

Species of flowering plant

Saponaria pumila is a species of perennial plants in the family Caryophyllaceae, commonly known as dwarf soapwort. It is native to the eastern Alps of Austria and Italy and the southern parts of the Eastern Carpathians in Romania.
