= Pogochaetia =

Scientific classification
- Kingdom: Animalia
- Phylum: Arthropoda
- Clade: Pancrustacea
- Class: Insecta
- Order: Lepidoptera
- Family: Gelechiidae
- Tribe: Gnorimoschemini
- Genus: Pogochaetia; Staudinger, 1880

Synonyms
- Chaetopogon Rye, 1881; Pogonochaetia Rye, 1881

Genus of moths

Pogochaetia is a genus of moths in the family Gelechiidae.

== Species ==
- Pogochaetia solitaria Staudinger, 1880
- Pogochaetia dmitrii Bidzilya, 2005
