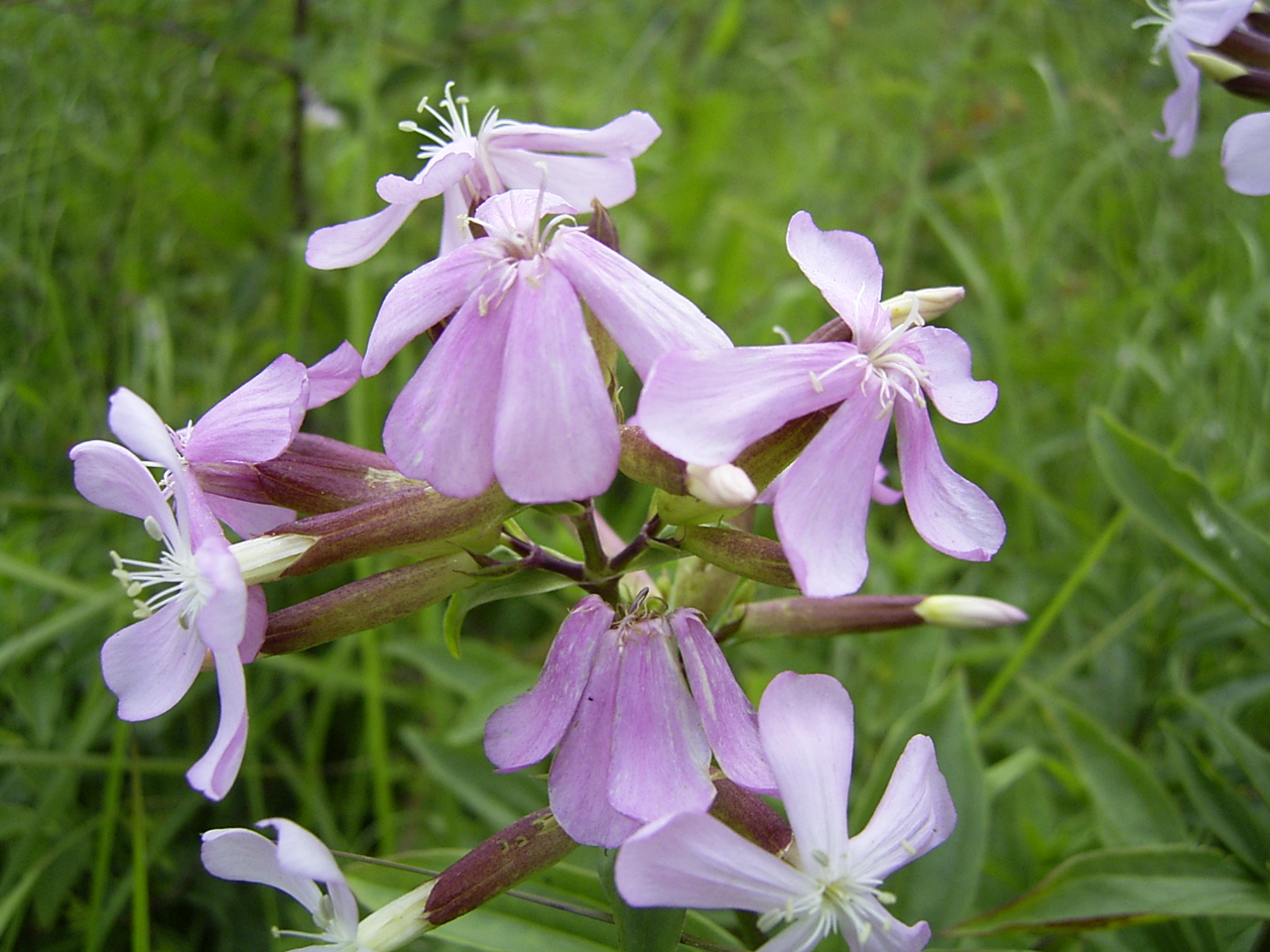

Scientific classification
- Kingdom: Plantae
- Clade: Tracheophytes
- Clade: Angiosperms
- Clade: Eudicots
- Order: Caryophyllales
- Family: Caryophyllaceae
- Genus: Saponaria
- Species: S. officinalis

Binomial name
- Saponaria officinalis L.

Synonyms
- Bootia saponaria Neck.; Bootia vulgaris Neck; Lychnis officinalis (L.) Scop.; Silene saponaria Fr. ex Willk. & Lange

= Saponaria officinalis =

Species of plant

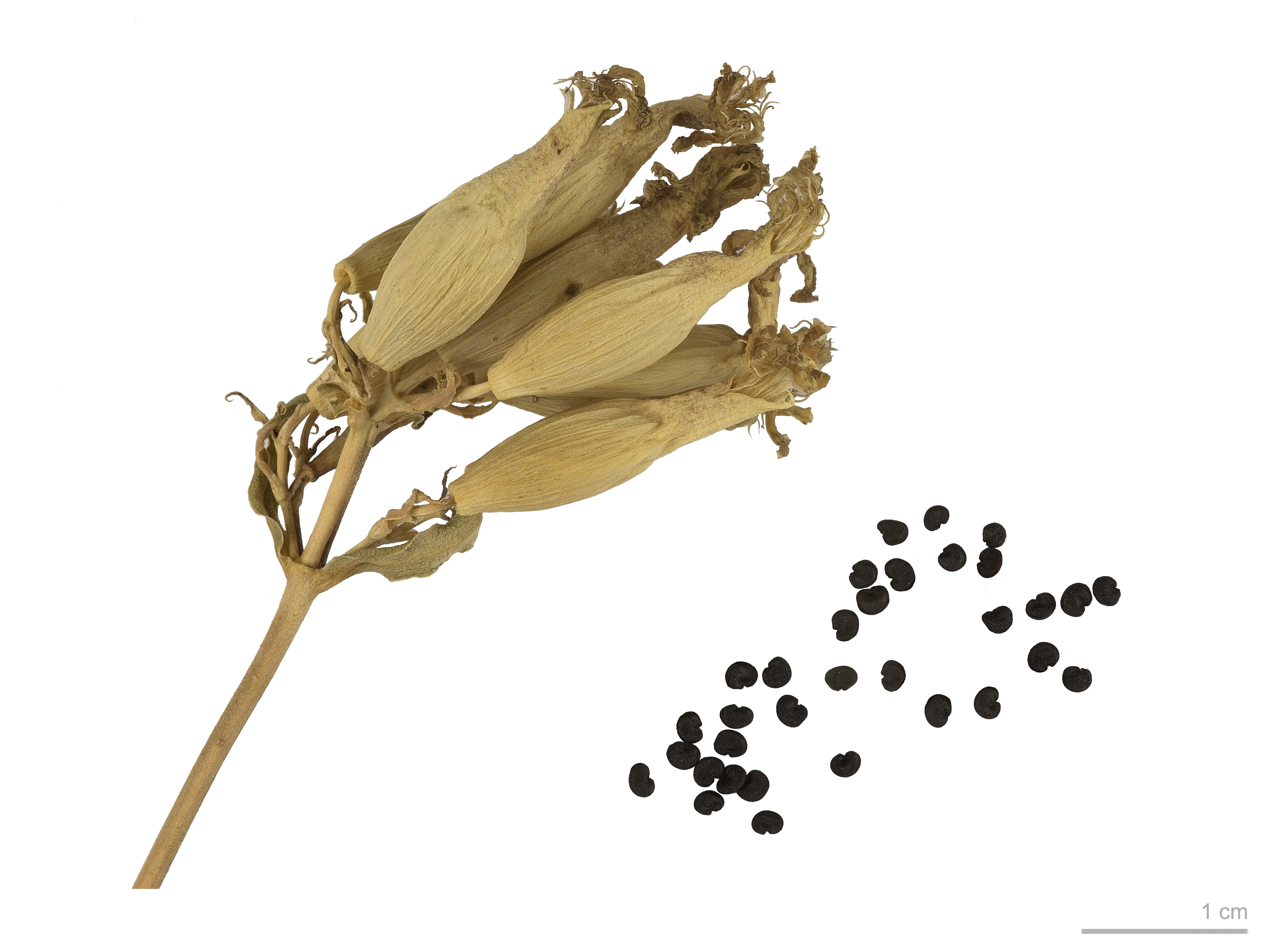
Pods and seeds

Saponaria officinalis is a common perennial plant from the family Caryophyllaceae. This plant has many common names, including common soapwort, bouncing-bet, crow soap, and soapweed. There are about 20 species of soapworts altogether.

The scientific name Saponaria is derived from the Latin sapo (stem sapon-) meaning "soap", which, like its common name, refers to its utility in cleaning. From this same Latin root is derived the name of the toxic substances saponins found in many plants, including a specific saporin saponarin contained in the roots at levels up to 20 percent when the plant is flowering (Indian soapnuts contain only 15 percent). The flowers colouring likely reflects the chemical environment of saponarin. Saponins produce a lather when in contact with water. The epithet officinalis indicates its medicinal functions. It is a common host plant for some moth species, including the white-lined sphinx.

Saponaria officinalis' native range extends throughout Europe, and in Asia to western Siberia. It grows in cool places at low or moderate elevations under hedgerows and along the shoulders of roadways. It can be found as a horticultural escapee and noxious invasive in much of North America.

== Description ==
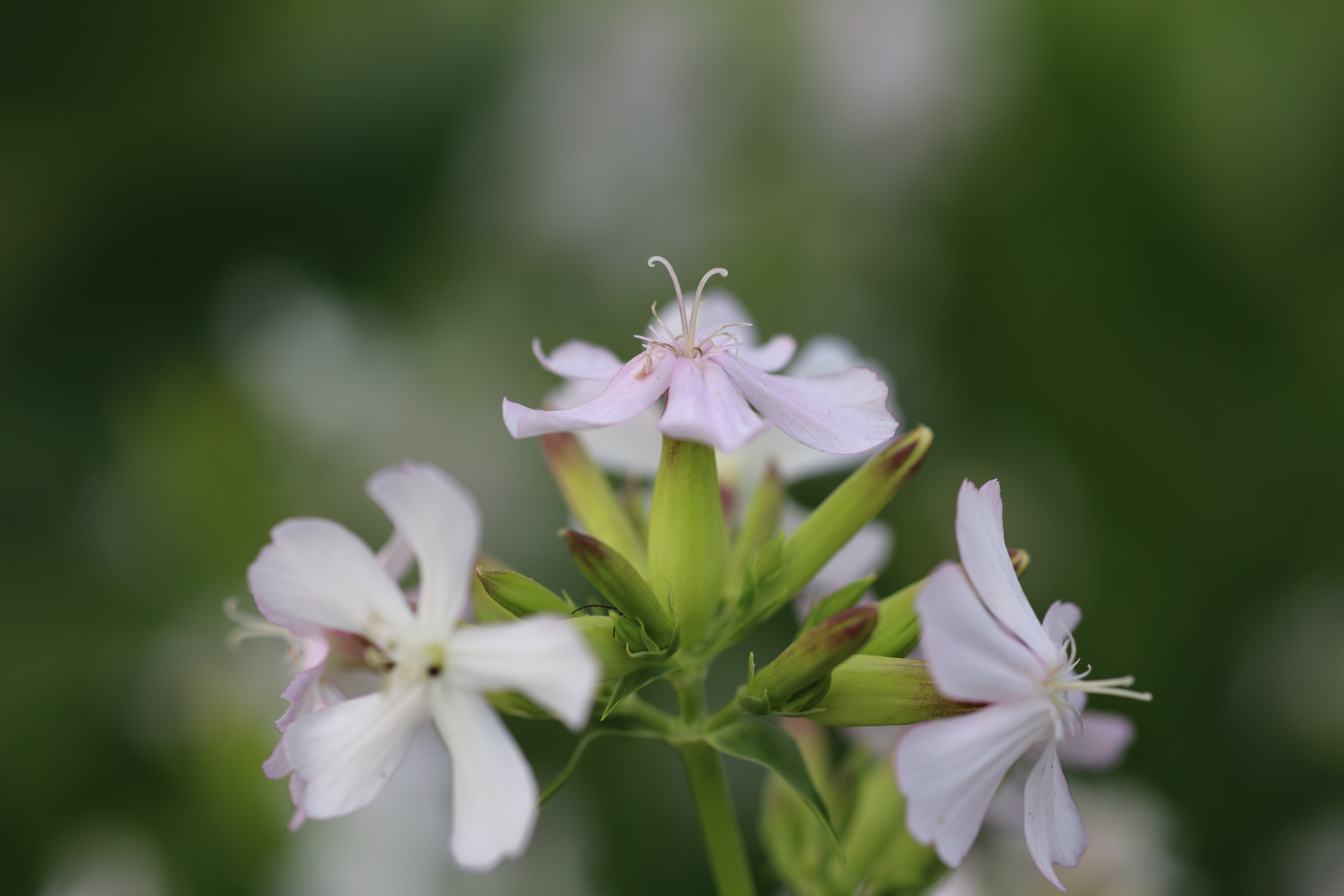
Flowers, Sainte-Geneviève-de-Batiscan, Quebec, Canada

The plant possesses leafy, unbranched stems (often tinged with red). It grows in patches, attaining a height of 70 cm (28 in). The broad, lanceolate, sessile leaves are opposite and between 4 and 12 cm long. Its sweetly scented flowers are radially symmetrical and pink, or sometimes white. Each of the five flat petals have two small scales in the throat of the corolla. They are about 2.5 cm (1 in) wide. They are arranged in dense, terminal clusters on the main stem and its branches. The long tubular calyx has five pointed red teeth.

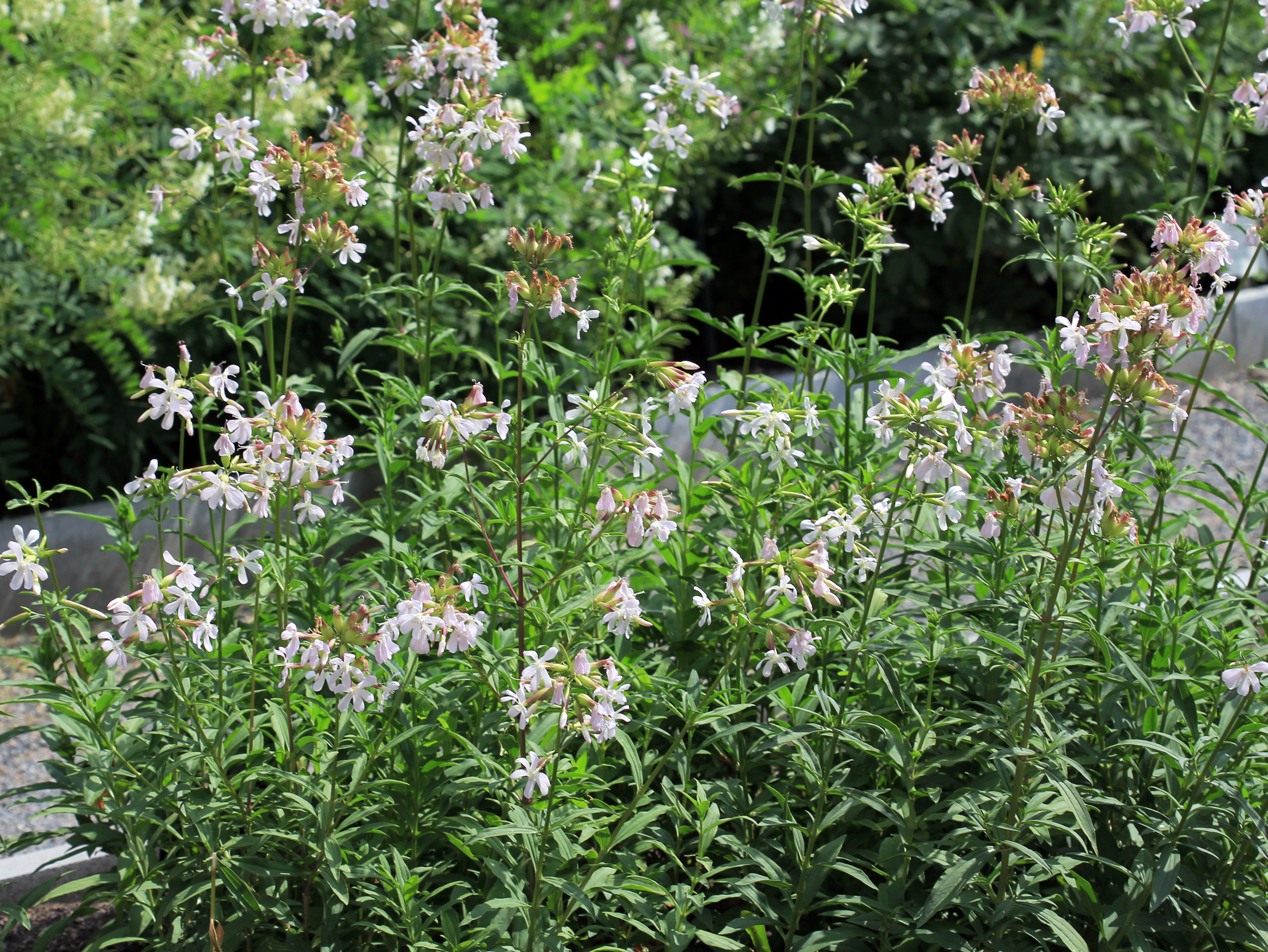
A blooming clump at the Prague Botanical Garden

The individual flowers open in the evening, and stay open for about three days. They produce a stronger scent at night and supplement nectar production during the night. The flowers are protandrous: on the second night of blooming, the pollen is released, and the stigma develops to its final position by the third night. Much of the seed production comes from self-pollination. The flowers are visited by various insects including Noctuidae, Sphingidae, bumblebees, and hoverflies.

In the Northern Hemisphere Saponaria officinalis blooms from May to September, and in the Southern Hemisphere October to March.

== External use ==
As its common name implies, it can be used as a very gentle soap, usually in dilute solution. It has historically been used to clean delicate or unique textiles, especially woollen fabrics; it has been hypothesized that the plant was used to treat the Shroud of Turin.

A lathery liquid that has the ability to dissolve fats or grease can be procured by boiling the leaves or roots in water. Leaves are chopped, boiled, and strained; the liquid can then be used as soap.

It has been widley used in Italy for skin conitions. In the Romanian village of Șieu-Odorhei, natives call the plant săpunele. It is traditionally used by the villagers as a soap replacement for dry skin.

== Internal use ==
Saponins have long been known to cause throat irritation and have a bitter taste, and the maximum amount in food is regulated in many jurisdictions. Some have medicinal uses and are well known plant toxins so an overdose could cause nausea, diarrhea, and vomiting. Different types of saponins are synthesized by the species. The saponin saponarin has low acute rat toxicity and no evidence of genotoxicity, so not all saponins are necessarily toxic when ingested.

Despite its toxic potential, Saponaria officinalis finds culinary use as an emulsifier in the commercial preparation of tahini and in brewing to create beer with a good head. In the Middle East, the root is often used as an additive in the process of making halva. The plant is used to stabilize the oils in the mixture and to create the distinctive texture of halva.

In traditional herbal medicine the roots of the species have been used as a diuretic. It was also used for coughs, bronchitis, stomach disorders, bone deformations, rheumatism, pimples, skin diseases, bile disorders, liver problems and respiratory system diseases.

Extracts from Saponaria officinalis have antioxidant properties and methanol extracts have antimicrobial actions against a wide range of bacteria including many human pathogens. A root extract is active against species of the pest plant mite Tetranychus urticae. Ethanol extract inhibit the gastric enzyme hydrogen potassium ATPase that produces stomach acid.

== Chemistry ==
Saponaria officinalis contains several saponins, which are ribosome-inactivating proteins. Amongst the saponins isolated with this property are isoform 6 of saponarin (SO6, saponin S6) from the seeds, and saporin-L1 (SAP) from the leaves. Saponariosides A,B, C, D, F, G, H, I, J, K, L, and M , vaccaroside D, dianchinenoside B, hydroxygypsogenic acid derivative compounds 1 and 2 and gypsogenic acid derivative compound 3 have been isolated from the whole plant or roots. The many compounds responsible for the floral scent (predominantly methyl benzoate), and that compose essential oil extracts from the plant have also been characterised.

Saponin S6 is able to kill cancer cells via apoptosis and saporin SO1861 found in the plant increases the cytotoxicity of other compounds.
