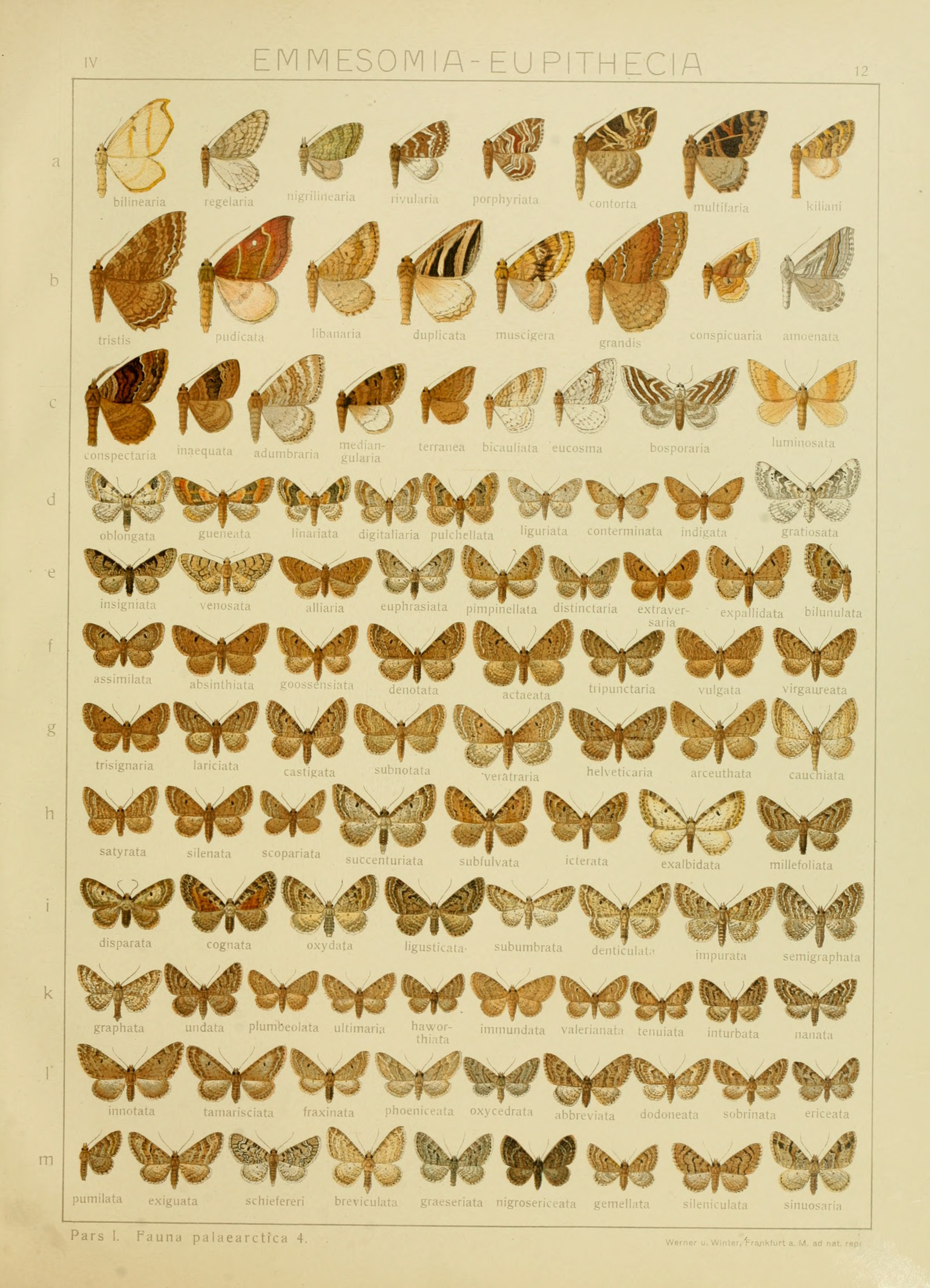
- in Seitz m

Scientific classification
- Domain: Eukaryota
- Kingdom: Animalia
- Phylum: Arthropoda
- Class: Insecta
- Order: Lepidoptera
- Family: Geometridae
- Genus: Eupithecia
- Species: E. schiefereri

Binomial name
- Eupithecia schiefereri Bohatsch, 1893

= Eupithecia schiefereri =

Species of moth

Eupithecia schiefereri is a moth in the family Geometridae. It is found from North Africa through central Spain, southern France, the central and southern Alps, Italy and the southern Balkan Peninsula to eastern Turkey and northern Iran.

The wingspan is 18–24 mm. Adults are on wing from April to June.

The larvae feed on Saponaria and Silene species. Larvae can be found from May to September. The species overwinters in the pupal stage.
