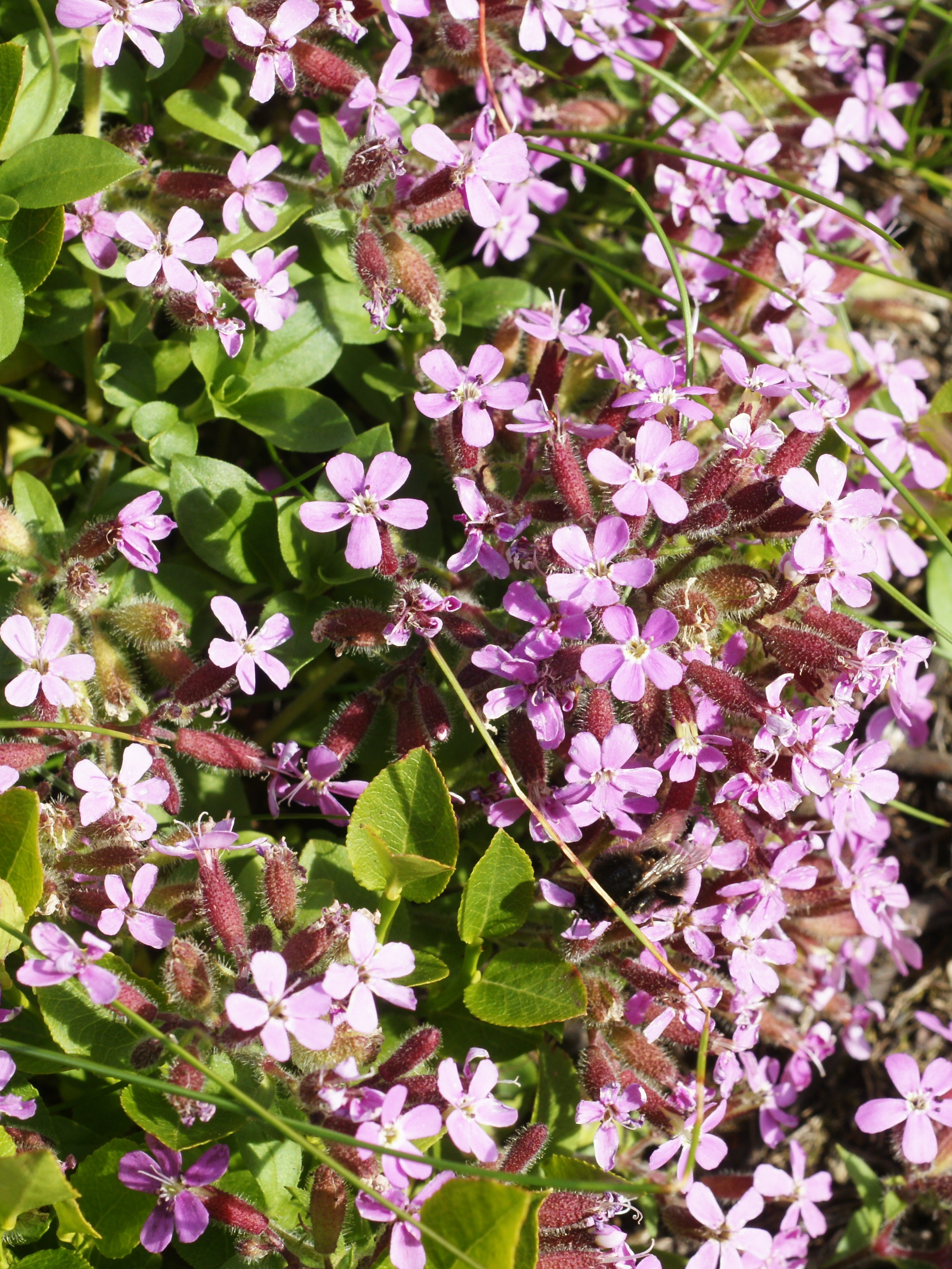

Scientific classification
- Kingdom: Plantae
- Clade: Tracheophytes
- Clade: Angiosperms
- Clade: Eudicots
- Order: Caryophyllales
- Family: Caryophyllaceae
- Genus: Saponaria
- Species: S. ocymoides

Binomial name
- Saponaria ocymoides L.

Subspecies
- Saponaria ocymoides subsp. alsinoides (Viv.) Arcang.; Saponaria ocymoides subsp. ocymoides

Synonyms
- Saponaria ocymifolia Salisb.

= Saponaria ocymoides =

Species of flowering plant

Saponaria ocymoides, the rock soapwort or tumbling Ted, is a species of semi-evergreen perennial flowering plant belonging to the family Caryophyllaceae, native to south western and southern central Europe.

== Etymology ==
The Latin specific epithet ocymoides means “resembling basil” (Ocimum). However the resemblance is superficial, as the two plants are not closely related. In fact Saponaria ocymoides belongs to the same family as pinks and carnations.

== Description ==
Reaching a height of 10–40 centimetres (3.9–15.7 in), the stem is prostrate to ascending, woody, reddish, quite hairy and very branched. The leaves are ovate to lanceolate, sessile and hairy, 1–3 cm long. The five-petalled flowers are arranged in groups at the ends of branches. They have red or pink (rarely white) petals and blue anthers. The sepals are fused in a tube about an 8 to 10 millimeters long. The flowering period extends from May to August in the Northern Hemisphere. The fruit is an ovoid capsule, up to 9 mm long.

== Distribution ==
This species ranges from the mountains of Spain to Corsica, Sardinia and Slovenia, from the Apennines to the Alps. It grows in rocky and stony places, dry slopes and forests (especially pine forests). It prefers calcareous (alkaline) soils, at an elevation of up to 1,500 metres (4,900 ft), rarely up to 2,400 metres (7,900 ft).

== Subspecies ==
Two subspecies are accepted.

- Saponaria ocymoides subsp. alsinoides (Viv.) Arcang. (synonym Saponaria alsinoides Viv.) – Sardinia
- Saponaria ocymoides subsp. ocymoides (synonyms Bootia ocymoides Neck. ex Rchb., Lychnis ocymoides Jess., Saponaria repens Lam., Saponaria viscosa Dulac, Silene alsinoides Viv., and Silene ocymoides E.H.L.Krause) – Austria, Corsica, France, Germany, Italy, Sardinia, Spain, Switzerland, and former Yugoslavia

== Cultivation ==
Saponaria ocymoides is cultivated as an ornamental plant for rock gardens and dry stone walls, in well-drained alkaline or neutral soil in full sun. Like most alpine plants it dislikes winter wetness around its roots. It has gained the Royal Horticultural Society's Award of Garden Merit.

== Gallery ==
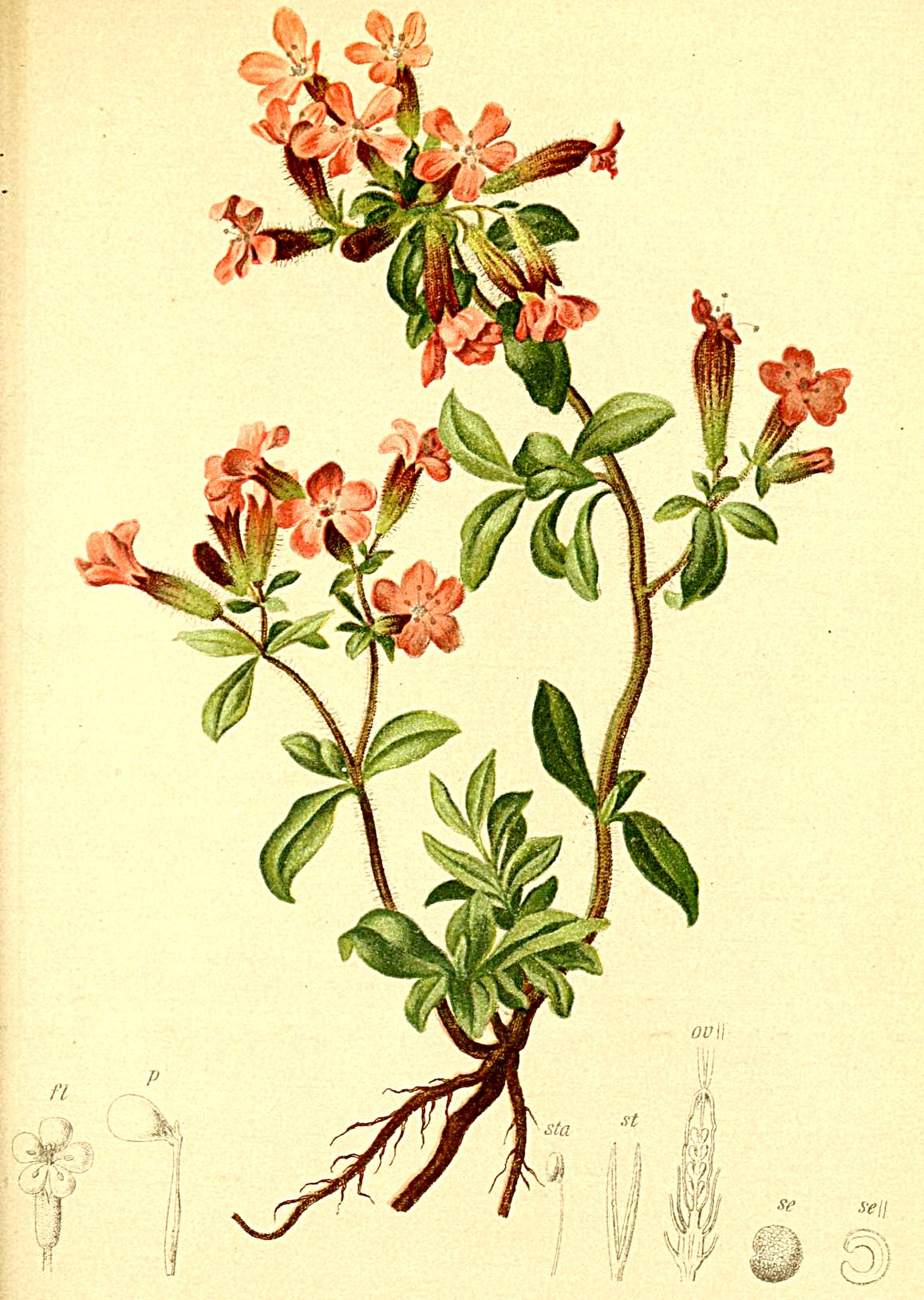
Illustration from Atlas der Alpenflora

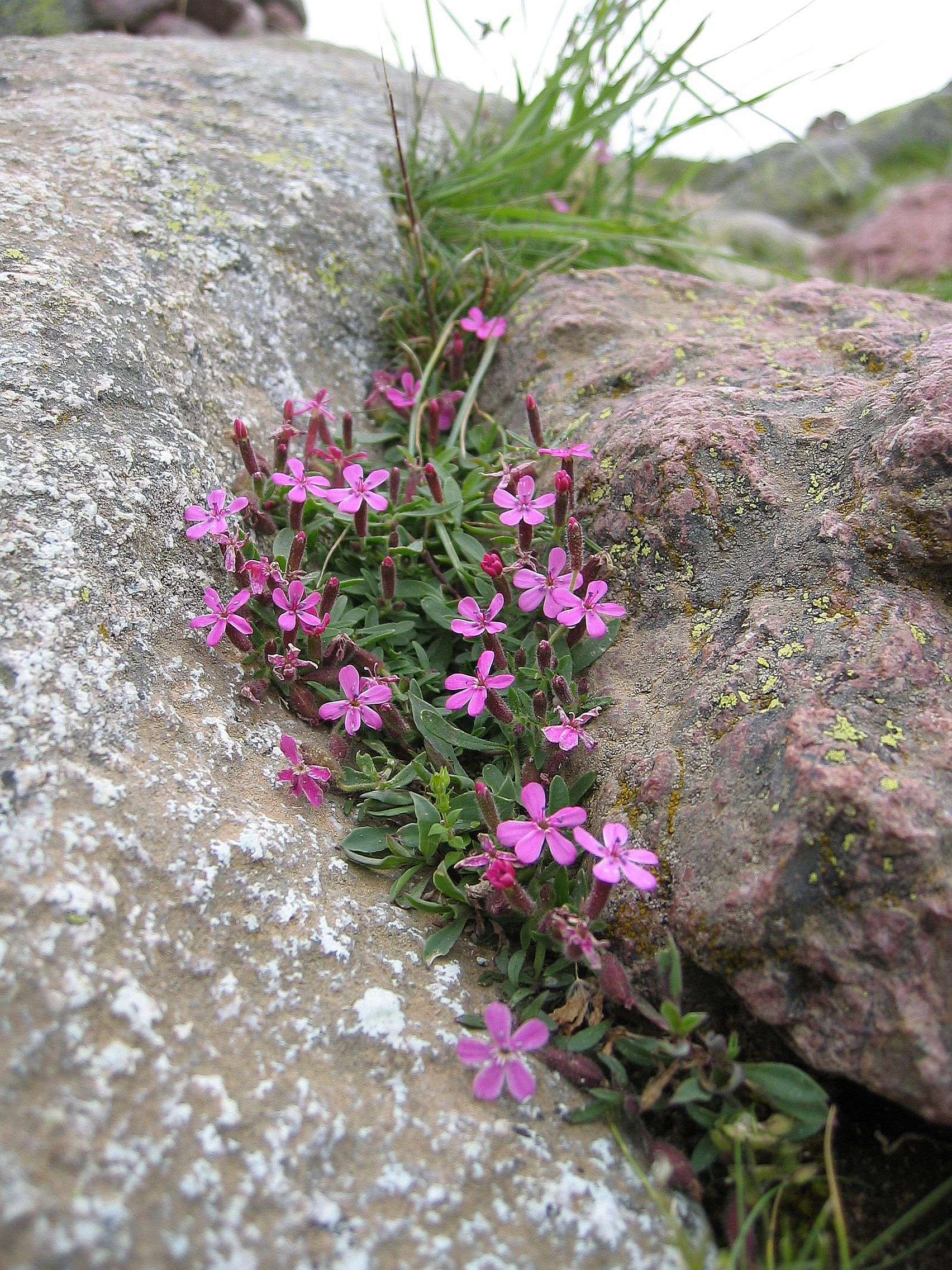
Plant in Corsica

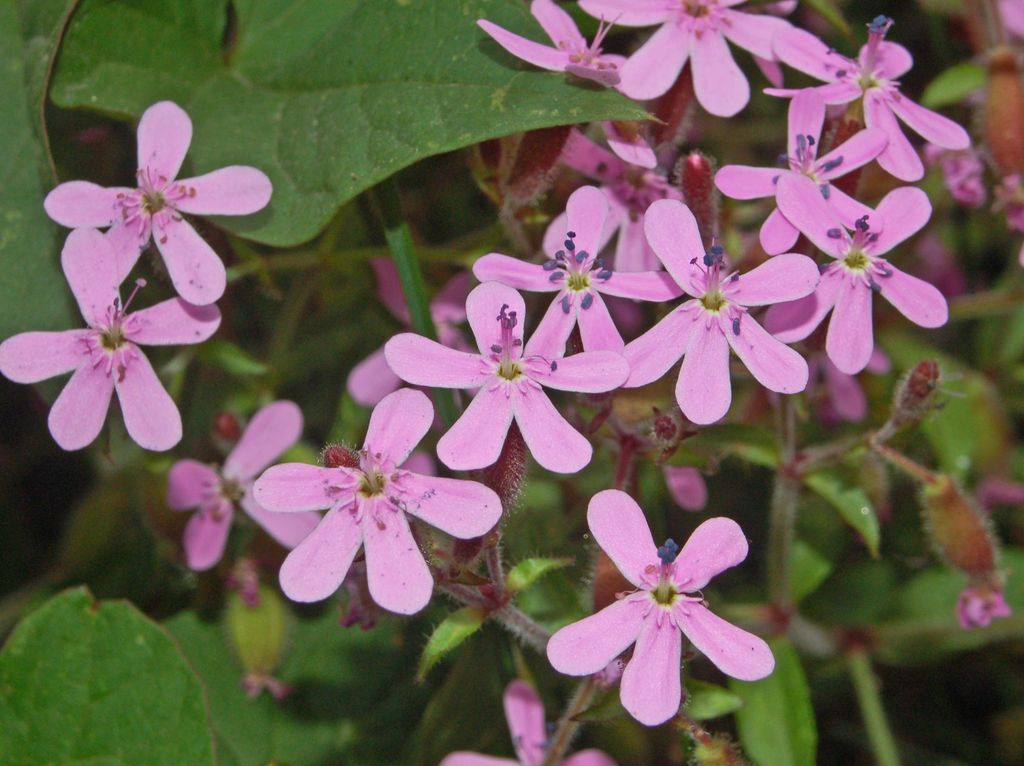

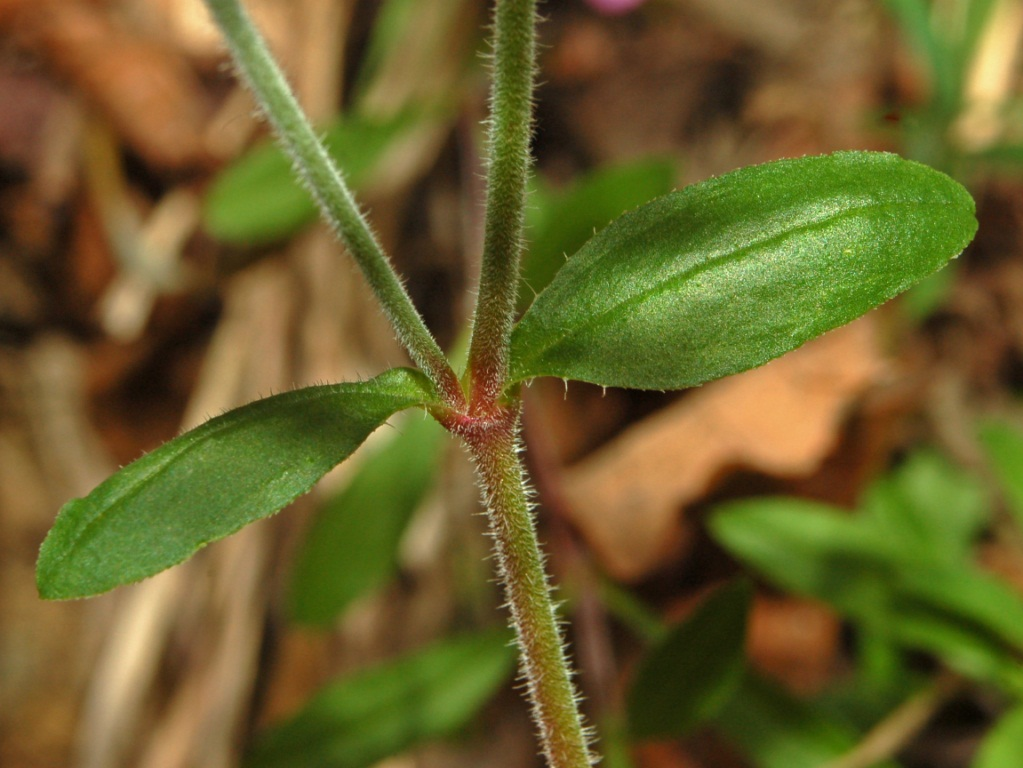
