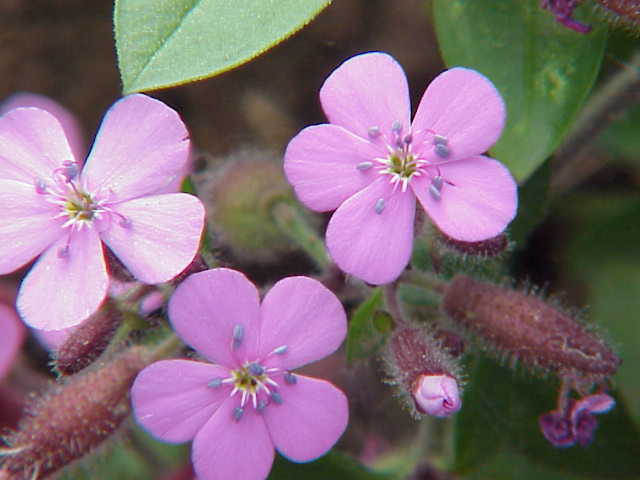
- Saponaria ocymoides

Scientific classification
- Kingdom: Plantae
- Clade: Tracheophytes
- Clade: Angiosperms
- Clade: Eudicots
- Order: Caryophyllales
- Family: Caryophyllaceae
- Genus: Saponaria; L. (1753)

Synonyms
- Bootia Neck. (1768), nom. illeg.; Pleioneura Rech.f. (1951); Proteinia (Ser.) Rchb. (1841); Smegmathamnium Fenzl ex Rchb. (1844); Spanizium Griseb. (1843)

= Saponaria =

Genus of flowering plants

Saponaria (commonly known as soapworts) is a genus of flowering plants in the family Caryophyllaceae. It is usually characterized by pink or white flowers.

== Description ==
The plants are herbaceous perennials and annuals, some with woody bases. The flowers are abundant, five-petalled and usually in shades of pink or white.

== Taxonomy ==
The genus is closely related to the genus Silene, being distinguished from these by having only two (not three or five) styles in the flower.

It is also related to Gypsophila, but its calyx is cylindrical rather than bell-shaped.

=== Species ===
The most familiar species might be common soapwort (S. officinalis), which is native to Eurasia but is known in much of the world as an introduced species, often a weed, and sometimes a cultivated ornamental plant.

There are thirty to forty species in the genus overall.

Plants of the World Online accepts 39 species:

- Saponaria aenesia Heldr.
- Saponaria bargyliana Gomb.
- Saponaria bellidifolia Sm.
- Saponaria biovulata (Stapf) Barkoudah
- Saponaria bodeana Boiss.
- Saponaria caespitosa DC.
- Saponaria calabrica Guss.
- Saponaria cerastoides Fisch. ex C.A.Mey.
- Saponaria cypria Boiss.
- Saponaria dalmasi H.Boissieu
- Saponaria emineana Gemici & Kit Tan
- Saponaria glutinosa M.Bieb.
- Saponaria griffithiana Boiss.
- Saponaria gypsacea Vved.
- Saponaria halophila Hedge & Hub.-Mor.
- Saponaria iranica Dashti, Assadi & Sharifnia
- Saponaria jagelii Phitos & Greuter
- Saponaria karapinarensis Vural & Adıgüzel
- Saponaria kotschyi Boiss.
- Saponaria lutea L.
- Saponaria mesogitana Boiss.
- Saponaria ocymoides L.
- Saponaria officinalis L.
- Saponaria orientalis L.
- Saponaria pachyphylla Rech.f.
- Saponaria pamphylica Boiss. & Heldr.
- Saponaria picta Boiss.
- Saponaria pinetorum Hedge
- Saponaria prostrata Willd.
- Saponaria pumila Janch.
- Saponaria pumilio Boiss.
- Saponaria sewerzowii Regel & Schmalh.
- Saponaria sicula Raf.
- Saponaria stenopetala Rech.f.
- Saponaria subrosularis Rech.f.
- Saponaria suffruticosa Nábělek
- Saponaria syriaca Boiss.
- Saponaria tadzhikistanica (Botsch.) V.A.Shultz
- Saponaria tridentata Boiss.

=== Etymology ===
The genus name Saponaria derives from the Latin sapo ("soap") and -aria ("pertaining to"), with at least one species, S. officinalis, being used to make soap.

== Ecology ==
Saponaria species are eaten by the larvae of some butterflies and moths, including the Lychnis and Coleophora saponariella, which is exclusive to the genus.

== Uses ==
The plants contain saponins and a liquid soap can be produced by soaking the leaves in water. This soap is still used to clean delicate antique tapestries.
