= Tuberculosis in relation to HIV =

TB related deaths hiv

The co-epidemic of tuberculosis (TB) and human immunodeficiency virus (HIV) is one of the major global health challenges in the present time. The World Health Organization (WHO) reported that TB is the leading cause of death in those with HIV. In 2019, TB was responsible for 30% of the 690,000 HIV/AIDS related deaths worldwide and 15% of the 1.4 million global TB deaths were in people with HIV or AIDS. The two diseases act in combination as HIV drives a decline in immunity, while tuberculosis progresses due to defective immune status. Having HIV makes one more likely to be infected with tuberculosis, especially if one's CD4 T-cells are low. CD4 T-cells below 200 (usually due to untreated HIV) increases one's risk of tuberculosis infection by 25 times. This condition becomes more severe in case of multi-drug (MDRTB) and extensively drug resistant TB (XDRTB), which are difficult to treat and contribute to increased mortality (see Multi-drug-resistant tuberculosis). Tuberculosis can occur at any stage of HIV infection. The risk and severity of tuberculosis increases soon after infection with HIV. Although tuberculosis can be a relatively early manifestation of HIV infection, the risk of tuberculosis progresses as the CD4 cell count decreases along with the progression of HIV infection. The risk of TB generally remains high in HIV-infected patients, remaining above the background risk of the general population even with effective immune reconstitution and high CD4 cell counts with antiretroviral therapy.

Globally, with the initiation of highly active antiretroviral therapy (HAART) from 2000-2021 in those with HIV on a much larger scale, including in resource limited settings, the incidence of tuberculosis declined by 60% and tuberculosis deaths decreased by 72%. HAART reduces the risk of tuberculosis infection in those with HIV by 67-84%.

== Tuberculosis and HIV infection ==
Classically, tuberculosis affects the upper lobes with cavitary lesions. But in those with HIV, presentation may be atypical. In those with HIV and immunosuppression, lower lobe, non-cavitary nodular consolidations may be seen, with hilar or mediastinal lymph node swelling. In advanced HIV/AIDS, the chest x-ray may be normal.

Those with HIV and TB are more likely to have disseminated TB (where TB spreads to the bloodstream or to other organs outside the lungs). The most common sites of extrapulmonary TB in those with HIV are the lymph nodes, liver, spleen, and central nervous system (TB meningitis). TB meningitis in those with HIV has a mortality rate of 40%. TB may present as sepsis in those with HIV, with some studies having shown that 50% of inpatients with HIV have mycobacteremia (tuberculosis in the bloodstream). In those infected with latent TB and HIV, there is a 5–10% chance that latent TB infection will progress into active tuberculosis disease. If proper treatment is not given in case of active disease, then death rate is about 50%.

== Pathogenesis of co-infection of HIV and tuberculosis ==
TB disease appears when the immune response is unable to stop the growth of mycobacteria. Normally CD4+ helper T-cells secrete the cytokine IFN-γ which recruits macrophages and stimulates them to destroy tuberculosis bacteria and surround them, forming a granuloma to prevent spread of infection. Granulomas wall off the TB bacteria and may arrest disease in a latent phase. In patients with HIV, especially those with low CD4+ helper T cell counts, granulomas are disorganized, poorly formed, or sometimes not forming at all, leading to TB dissemination throughout the lungs and body. Those with HIV also have reduced macrophage differentiation into Langhans cells or epithelioid cells which help to form the granulomas. Granulomas are also characterized by increased neutrophil infiltration, necrosis and increased TB bacteria. During HIV infection, IFN-γ production is decreased dramatically which leads to an increased risk of developing reactivation or reinfection by M. tuberculosis in these HIV/TB patients.

Those with TB and HIV also have reduced CCRD+ CD4+ T-cells at mucosal sites and reduced numbers of TB specific CD4+ T-cells leading to increased susceptibility to severe TB infection. Thus, those with HIV and TB are at increased risk of TB in the bloodstream (mycobacterial bacteremia).

TB also influences HIV evolution. Proinflammatory cytokine production by tuberculous granulomas (in particular TNFα) has been associated with increased HIV viremia, which might accelerate the course of disease.

== Prevention ==
When HIV-negative children take isoniazid after they have been exposed to tuberculosis, their risk to contract tuberculosis is reduced. A Cochrane review investigated whether giving isoniazid to HIV-positive children can help to prevent this vulnerable group from getting tuberculosis. They included three trials conducted in South Africa and Botswana and found that isoniazid given to all children diagnosed with HIV may reduce the risk of active tuberculosis and death in children who are not on antiretroviral treatment. For children taking antiretroviral medication, no clear benefit was detected.

Isoniazid, rifapentine or both may be given to those with HIV as preventative therapy and have been shown to prevent infection with TB (both in those being treated for HIV and those that were untreated). Preventative therapy may be given for 3-6 months at a time or indefinitely, however the utility of indefinite TB preventative therapy is not well established. Isoniazid given for 36 months was shown to reduce the risk of TB by 38% as compared to 6 months of therapy in those with HIV. However, other another study showed limited benefit in preventing TB by starting another 3 month preventative regiment of rifapentine-isoniazid 12 months after the first course in those receiving therapy for HIV. Rifapentine or rifampin was associated with less liver toxicity, less risk of death and increase adherence compared to isoniazid therapy.

The BCG vaccine may prevent some forms of severe TB in children with HIV (such as TB meningitis, a form of chronic meningitis), but in adults with HIV, the vaccine is not recommended.

The experimental M72/AS01E tuberculosis vaccine has shown to reduce the incidence of TB in adults by 50% and its immunogenicity has been demonstrated in those with HIV.

== Diagnosis ==
TB is difficult to diagnose in those with HIV as the signs and symptoms may be atypical. The classic cavitary lung lesions are not usually present and the mycobacterial load in the sputum is low making diagnosis difficult. The GeneXpert MTB/RIF is a PCR based test can simultaneously detect TB as well as resistance to rifampine with a 2 hour waiting time. The test can be performed on urine or blood. In contrast, a sputum culture and microscopic exam is much less sensitive and cultures may take weeks to result. The sensitivity of GeneXpert MTB/RIF was 63% in those with smear negative, culture positive sputum and 90% in those with HIV and culture-positive sputum. Specificity was 96%. The XPert MTB/RIF for the diagnosis of TB is recommended by the World Health Organization.

The Lateral flow urine lipoarabinomannan assay (LF-LAM) assay detects lipoaribomannan glycolipids normally in TB cell walls and can be used to diagnose TB. It has a sensitivity of 52% among inpatients and 29% in the outpatient setting. However, the sensitivity in diagnosing TB increases in those with HIV and low CD4+ cell counts. The test is recommended by the WHO in places where TB and HIV are endemic, and when used as part of the diagnostic process has been shown in multiple studies to reduce mortality rates. The LAM can be combined with XPert MTB/RIF to increase diagnostic yield, however if both tests are negative and clinical suspicion of TB in those with HIV remains high, empiric treatment may need to be started.

== Treatment ==
It is currently recommended that HIV-infected individuals with TB receive combined treatment for both diseases, irrespective of CD4+ cell count. Six months of a rifampin based regiment is the standard of care for those with HIV who develop TB. Those with rifampin resistant TB may be treated with bedaquiline, pretomanid, linezolid and moxifloxacin. The initiation of ART increases the risk of immune reconstitution inflammatory syndrome (IRIS) in those with HIV. TB associated IRIS presents as an inflammatory reaction within 3 months of starting ART for HIV as the immune system is reactivated, and is associated with new or worsening signs of TB. Steroids are indicated in the treatment of IRIS. It may present as recurrent pulmonary TB, inflammatory lymph node swelling and has a death rate of 2%, with an incidence of 18% in those with HIV who start ART. IRIS associated with inflammation of the central nervous system has the highest mortality. It is recommended that therapy for HIV be started within 2 weeks of starting therapy for TB and 4-8 weeks after starting therapy TB meningitis. The advantages of early ART include reduction in early mortality, reduction in relapses, preventing drug resistance to tuberculosis and reduction in occurrence of HIV-associated infections other than TB.

A systematic review investigated the optimal timing of starting antiretroviral therapy in adults with newly diagnosed pulmonary tuberculosis. The review suggested that early provision of antiretroviral therapy in HIV-infected adults with newly diagnosed tuberculosis improved survival in patients who had a low CD4 count (less than 0.050 x 109 cells/L). However, such therapy doubled the risk for IRIS. Regarding patients with higher CD4 counts (more than 0.050 x 109 cells/L), the evidence is not sufficient to make a conclusion about benefits or risks of early antiretroviral therapy.

== Research at molecular level ==
A study conducted on 452 patients revealed that the genotype responsible for higher IL-10 expression makes HIV infected people more susceptible to tuberculosis infection. Another study on HIV-TB co-infected patients also concluded that higher level of IL-10 and IL-22 makes TB patient more susceptible to Immune reconstitution inflammatory syndrome (IRIS). It is also seen that HIV co-infection with tuberculosis also reduces concentration of immunopathogenic matrix metalloproteinase (MMPs) leading to reduced inflammatory immunopathology.
