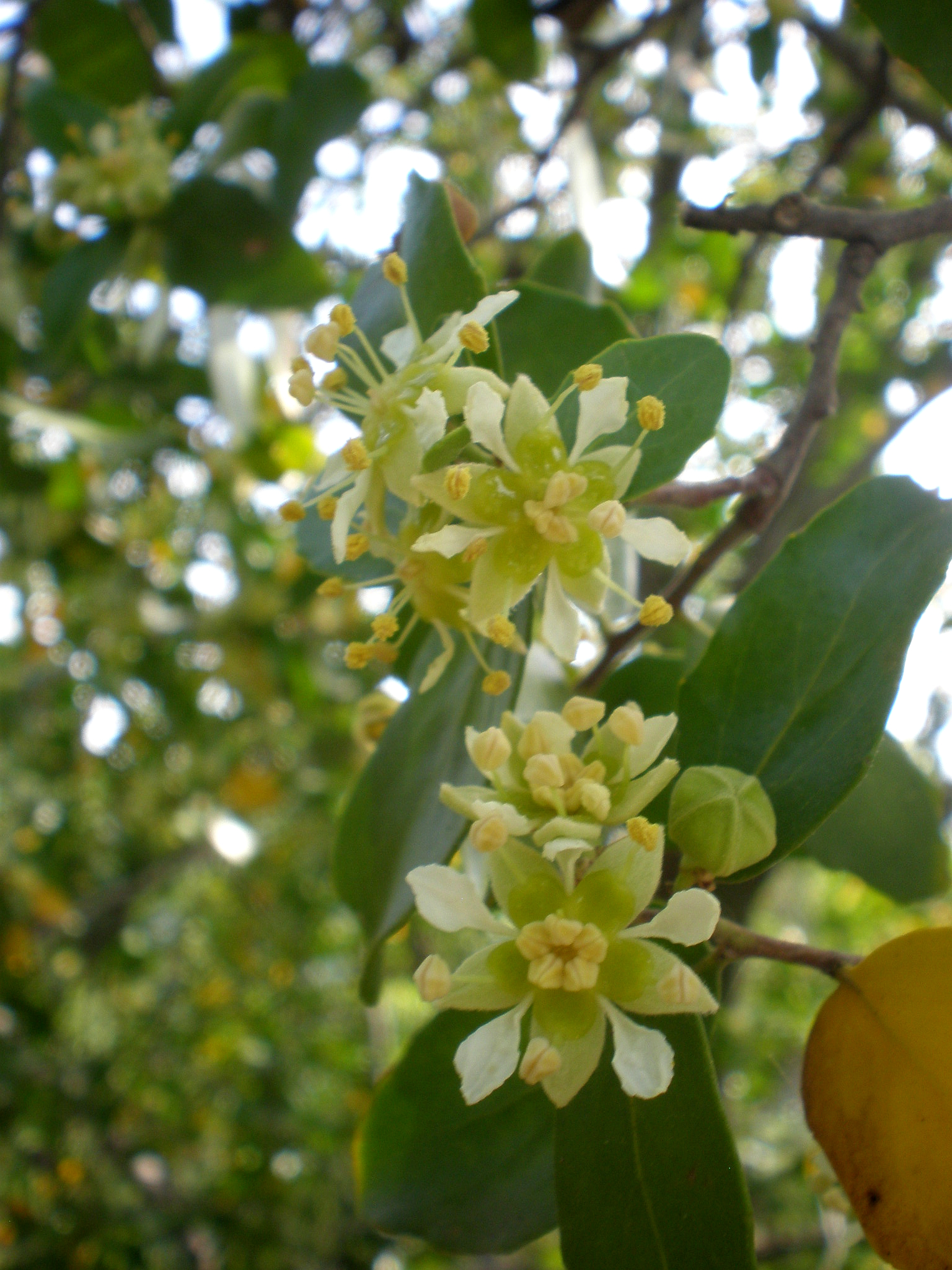
- Quillaja saponaria at Jardí Botànic de Barcelona

Scientific classification
- Kingdom: Plantae
- Clade: Tracheophytes
- Clade: Angiosperms
- Clade: Eudicots
- Clade: Rosids
- Order: Fabales
- Family: Quillajaceae; D.Don

Genera
- †Dakotanthus Manchester, Dilcher, Judd, Corder & Basinger; Quillaja Molina

Synonyms
- †Dakotanthaceae

= Quillajaceae =

Family of flowering plants

Quillajaceae, the soapbark family, is a family of flowering plants. It contains a single extant genus Quillaja, containing only two species, and one fossil species, Dakotanthus cordiformis.

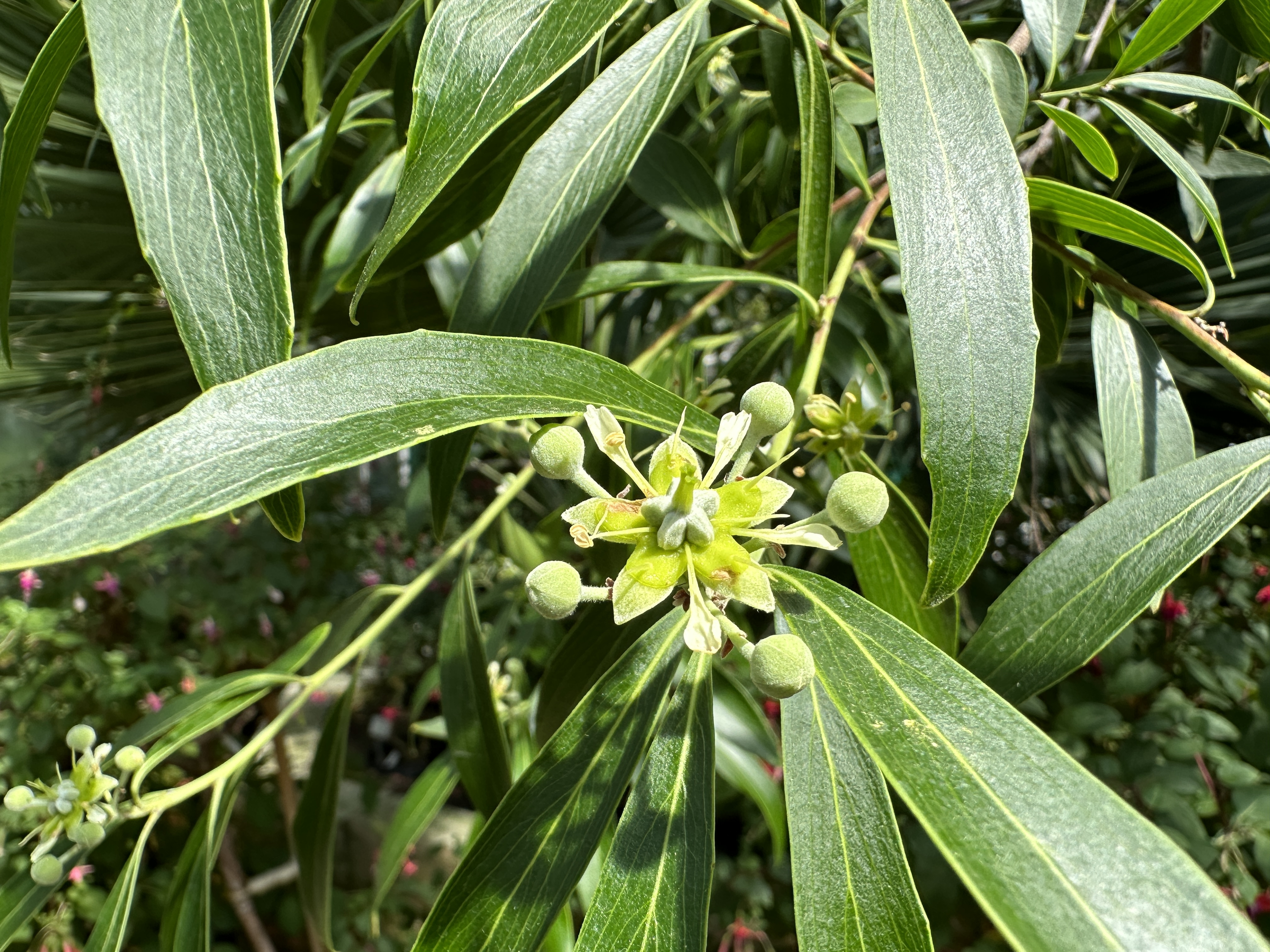
Quillaja brasiliensis in Botanischen Garten München

== Description ==
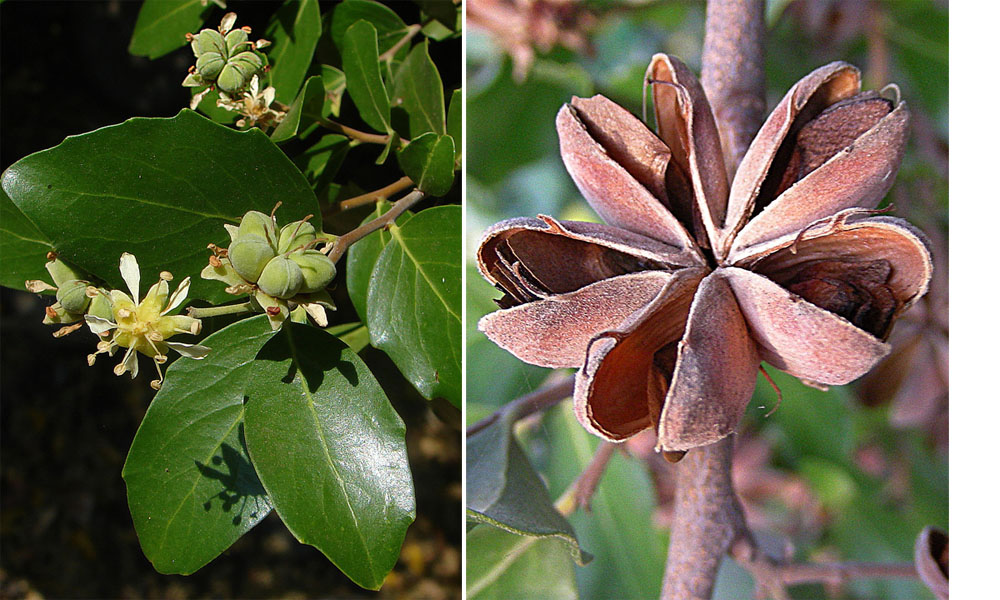
Capsules of the Quillaja saponaria. Fresh and closed on the left, open and dehiscent on the right.

Quillajaceae are saponin-producing trees with bisexual flowers. Their leaves tend to be simple and alternating. Inflorescences are in cymes. Flowers are varied among the species, but tend to have parts of five. Each whorl is distinct and unfused, notably having 5 apocarpous carpels. The fruits are loculicidal capsules, forming a star shape and dehiscing to release the seeds.

== Etymology ==
Both the family name Quillajaceae and the genus Quillaja are derived from the Mapuche word "quillean" which means "to wash." This is likely because of its saponin production, which is harvested to make soaps.

== Range ==
Species in the genus Quillaja are found in Southern America, with Q. saponaria found in central Chile and Q. brasiliensis found in southern Brazil as well as bordering countries. Fossils from the extinct species Dakotanthus cordiformis have been found in Kansas and Nebraska.

== Uses ==
Plants in the Quillajaceae family produce saponins, which are extracted from the bark or leaves. Saponin are used in many things, such as soap, cosmetics, and emulsions of vaccines.

== Phylogeny ==
Quillaja, the only genus in this family, was originally in the Rosaceae family, but recent molecular data instead placed it in its own family, Quillajaceae, under the order Fabales instead.
