= Fructose-asparagine =

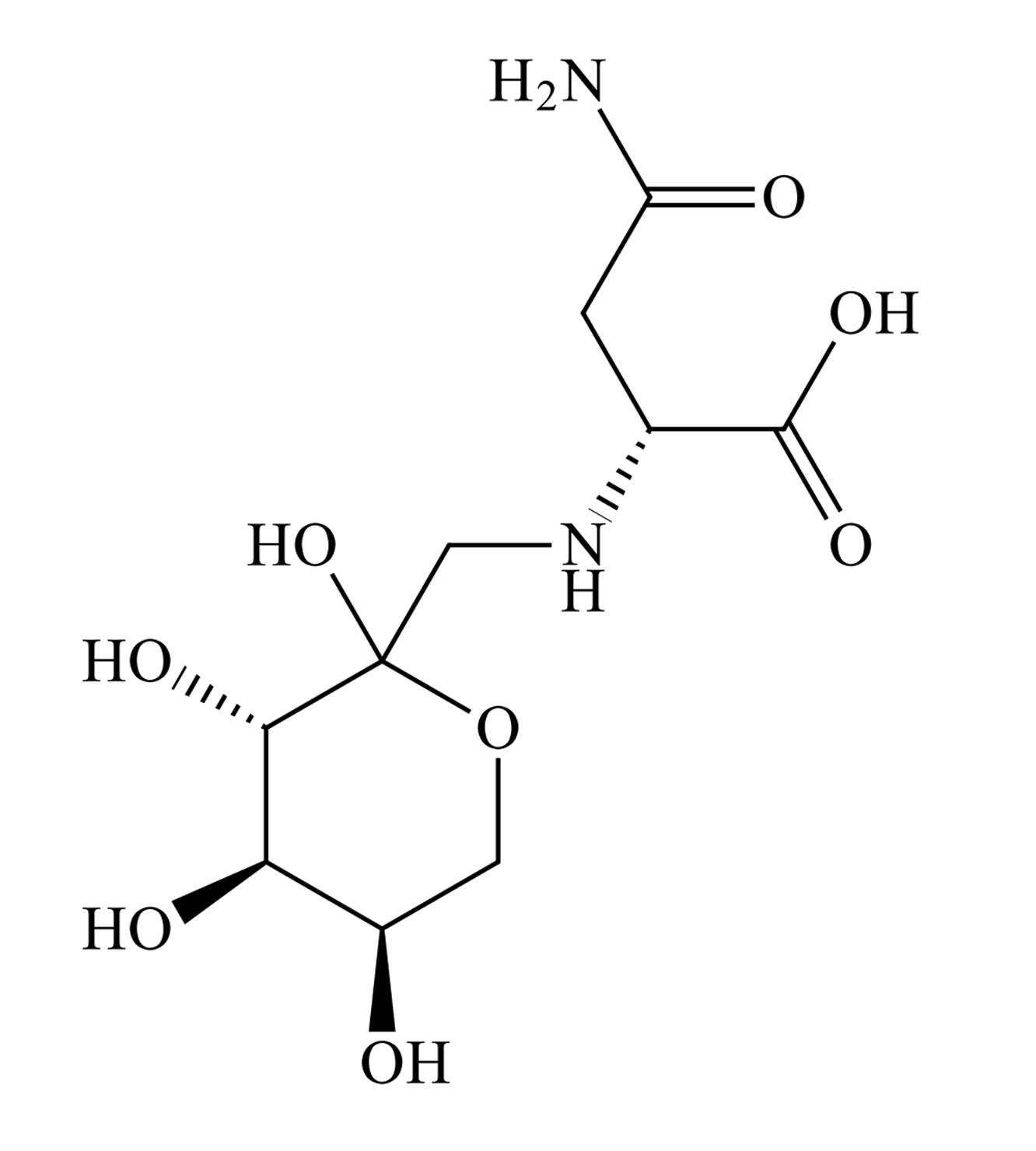

Names
- IUPAC name (2R)-4-amino-4-oxo-2-[ [(3S,4R,5R)-2,3,4,5-tetrahydroxyoxan-2-yl]methylamino]butanoic acid

Identifiers
CAS Number	34393-27-6
3D model (JSmol)	Interactive image
PubChem CID	71316980
CompTox Dashboard (EPA)	DTXSID70747834
- InChI: InChI=1S/C10H18N2O8/c11-6(14)1-4(9(17)18)12-3-10(19)8(16)7(15)5(13)2-20-10/h4-5,7-8,12-13,15-16,19H,1-3H2,(H2,11,14)(H,17,18)/t4-,5-,7-,8+,10?/m1/s1 Key: AOBQWGHMIKNEHI-CWOUCCJVSA-N
- SMILES: C1C(C(C(C(O1)(CNC(CC(=O)N)C(=O)O)O)O)O)O

Properties
Chemical formula	C_{10}H_{18}N_{2}O_{8}
Molar mass	294.25852
Appearance	off white crystals
Melting point	118 °C (244 °F; 391 K)
- Except where otherwise noted, data are given for materials in their standard state (at 25 °C [77 °F], 100 kPa). Infobox references

Fructose-asparagine (F-Asn) is a glycosylamine compound that is most notably used by Salmonella during Salmonella-mediated inflammation of the intestine. In addition to Salmonella, several other species of bacteria may utilize fructose-asparagine as a nutrient. The name of the genetic locus that encodes the uptake capability in Salmonella is fra. This fra locus has five genes: fraR (a regulator), fraB a fructose-asparagine deglycase, fraD a sugar kinase, fraA a fructose-asparagine transporter, and fraE a L-asparaginase. Notably, mutations in fraB cause the buildup of the toxic intermediate 6-phosphofuctose-aspartate (6-P-F-Asp). The buildup of 6-P-F-Asp has a bacteriostatic effect on fraB mutant cells, making FraB a potential drug target.

== Properties ==
Fructose-asparagine is a aminodeoxysugar. It takes the form of a pale yellow solid. It decomposes above 120 °C.

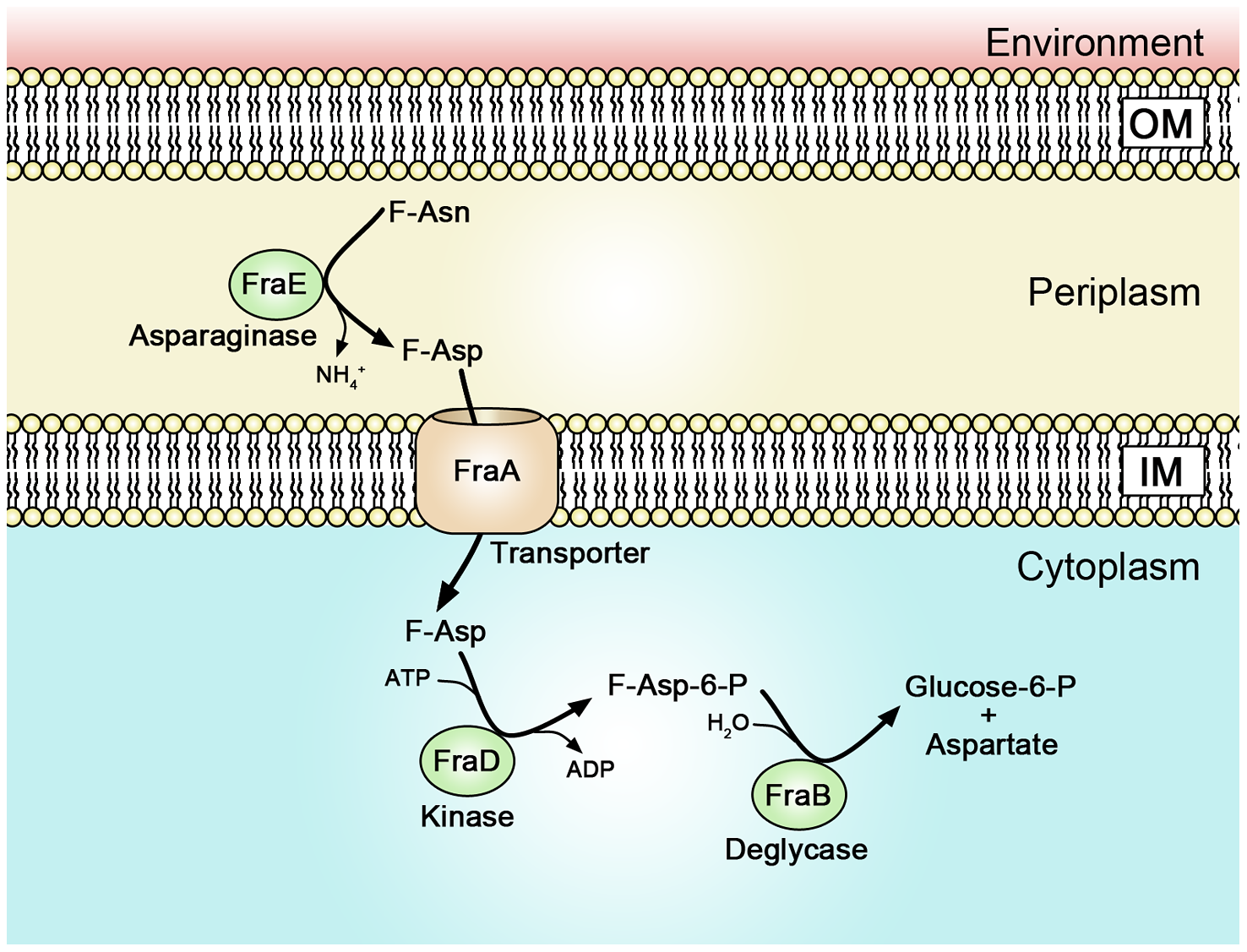
Proposed Fra protein system in Salmonella

== Production ==
Fructose-asparagine is formed when cooking food by way of the Maillard reaction. Fructose-asparagine can be prepared by refluxing D-glucose with sodium bisulfite in methanol, and then adding L-asparagine, and then acetic acid or malonic acid. An ion exchange resin then can separate the product from other contaminants.

Fructose-asparagine is found naturally in some foods, with dried asparagus containing 1.4% and carrot containing 0.1%.

== F-Asn Utilization Pathway and fra Gene Locus ==
=== fraR ===
A regulator gene that lies upstream of the fraBDAE operon. It is predicted to encode a transcription regulator that belongs to the GntR family.

=== fraE ===
fraE encodes the periplasmic fructose-asparaginase FraE that removes ammonia from F-Asn to form fructose-aspartate (F-Asp). Mutations in fraE do not prevent F-Asn utilization due to redundancy conferred by the ansB gene that codes for the asparaginase AnsB. It is hypothesized fraE may have resulted from a past duplication of ansB, which then underwent selection for specificity for F-Asn. FraE is specific for F-Asn and cannot function as a general periplasmic asparaginase like ansB.

=== fraA ===
fraA encodes a transporter of the Dcu family, which moves F-Asp, but not F-Asn, into the cytoplasm.

=== fraD ===
fraD encodes the sugar kinase FraD that phosphorylates F-Asp into 6-phosphofuctose-aspartate (6-P-F-Asp). It is unusual in that it can phosphorylate both the L and D stereoisomers of F-Asp.

=== fraB ===
fraB functions as a deglycase that cleaves 6-P-F-Asp into glucose-6-phosphate (G-6-P) and aspartate. Mutants lacking fraD or fraA are unable to grow in media containing only F-Asn, but are able to grow in media containing F-Asn along with glucose as an alternative carbon source. However, fraB mutants are unable to grow on glucose in the presence of F-Asn. This is due to the accumulation of 6-P-F-Asp inside the cell. This intermediate product has been shown to be bacteriostatic to Salmonella. This property makes FraB a potential target for drug treatments selective to Salmonella.

== Usage By Salmonella ==
Many gastrointestinal Salmonella serovars encode the fra locus, presumably to utilize fructose-asparagine within the inflamed gut environment. When Salmonella infects a host, it uses two Type 3 secretion systems, encoded within the genes SPI1 and SPI2, to initiate inflammation. This disrupts normal microbiota, and creates alternative electron acceptors such as nitrate and tetrathionate, and even allows oxygen to accumulate near epithelial surfaces. Microbiota that would normally consume F-Asn are eliminated by inflammation, allowing Salmonella access to this nutrient. The fra operon confers a fitness advantage to Salmonella in an inflamed intestinal tract. However, this is not due to fructose-asparagine being an essential nutrient, but rather because fructose-asparagine is toxic to a fraB mutant of Salmonella, Notable serovars of Salmonella enterica that do not utilize fructose-asparagine and are missing the fra operon include Typhi and Paratyphi A. This is likely due to their extraintestinal niche within the host.

== Usage By Other Bacteria ==
F-Asn is abundant in the intestinal tract of germ-free mice but is difficult to detect in conventional mice. This suggests that there are members of the microbiota that can consume F-Asn. It was recently discovered that several Clostridium, Citrobacter, and Klebsiella species can utilize F-Asn. Notably, Clostridioides difficile cannot utilize F-Asn. Salmonella can eliminate competition from these species by causing inflammation within the host intestinal tract. This kills other members of the microbiota that consume F-Asn and leaves Salmonella the sole user of the nutrient. Bioinformatic approaches suggest that Salmonella may have acquired the fra genes by horizontal transfer from the Clostridia.
