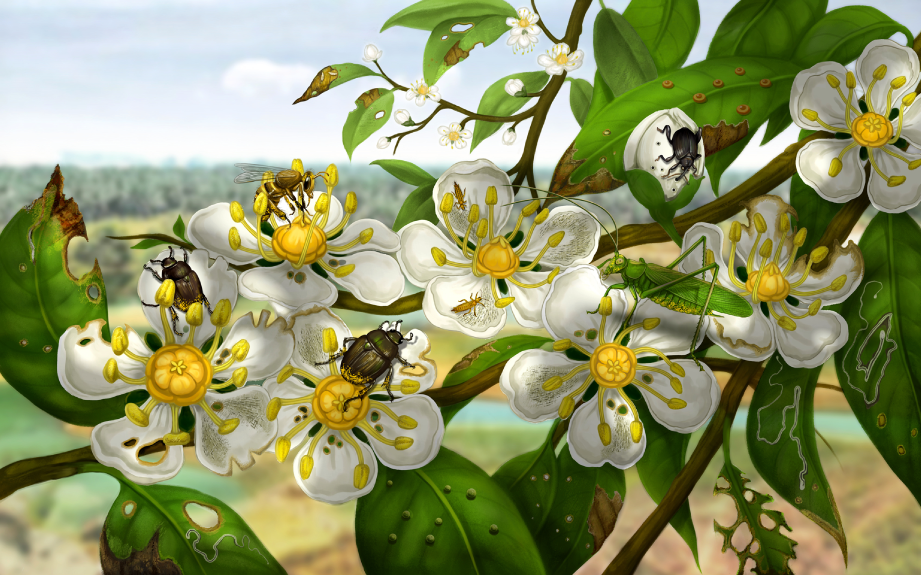

Scientific classification
- Kingdom: Plantae
- Clade: Embryophytes
- Clade: Tracheophytes
- Clade: Spermatophytes
- Clade: Angiosperms
- Clade: Eudicots
- Clade: Rosids
- Order: Fabales
- Family: Quillajaceae
- Genus: †Dakotanthus; Manchester, Dilcher, Judd & Basinger
- Species: †D. cordiformis

Binomial name
- †Dakotanthus cordiformis (Lesq.) Manchester, Dilcher, Judd & Basinger

Synonyms
- Carpites cordiformis Lesq.

= Dakotanthus =

Dakotanthus Temporal range: Albian–Cenomanian

Extinct species of flowering plant

Dakotanthus cordiformis is an extinct species of flowering plant from the Cretaceous Western Interior Seaway of North America.

== History ==
Five-chambered fruit from the Cretaceous Dakota Sandstone were monographed as early as 1874 by Leo Lesquereux for the United States Geological Survey. In 1892, Lesquereux published one such fossil as Carpites cordiformis. James Basinger and David Dilcher (1984) re-examined flower fossils from the Dakota Formation in Nebraska and published them as the "Rose Creek flower", one of the earliest recorded bisexual flowers, after the Rose Creek Pit of the Dakota Formation. In 2018, "Rose Creek flower specimens" were again re-examined and renamed Dakotanthus cordiformis with a noted similarity to the extant family Quillajaceae.
