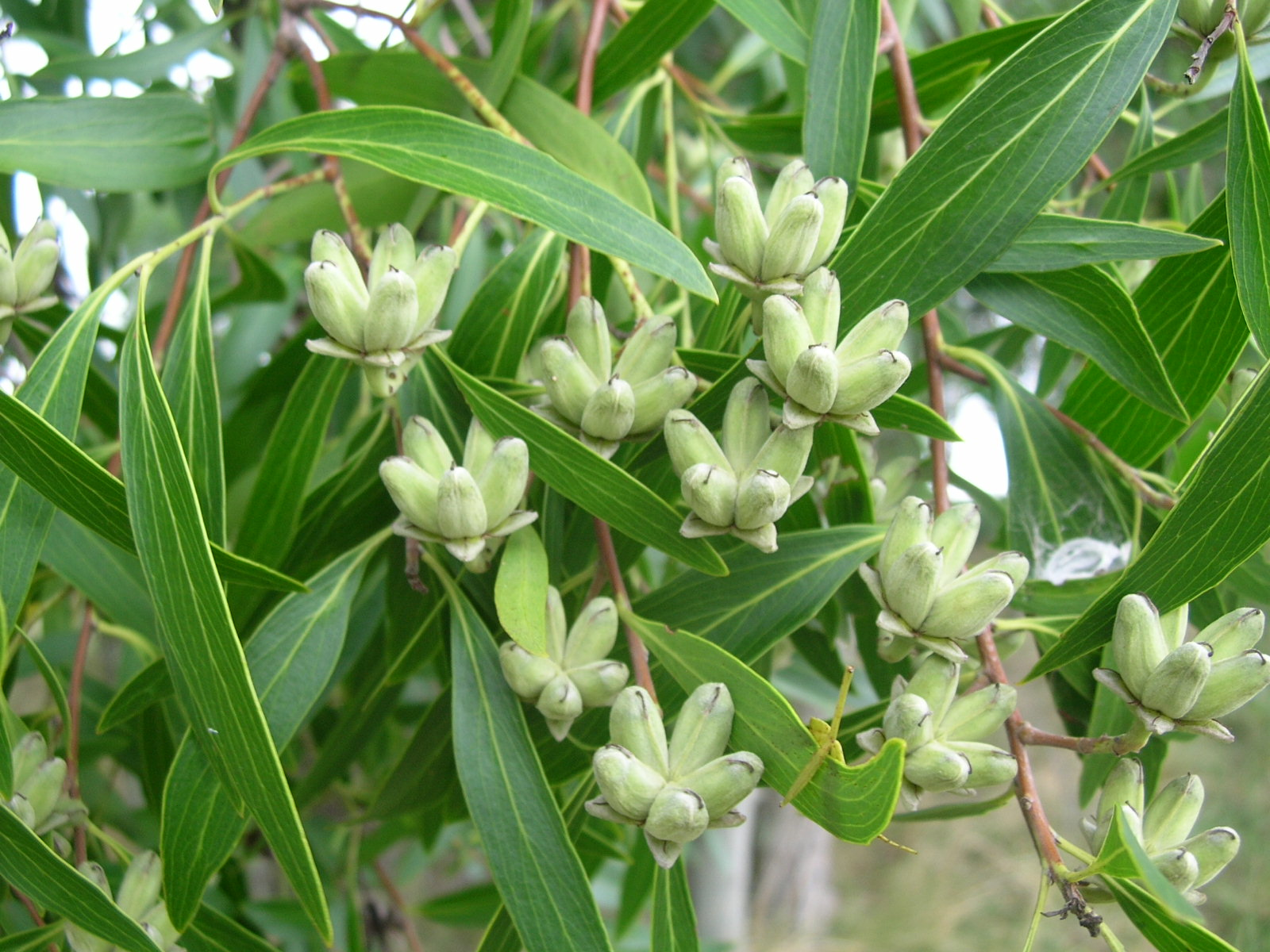

Scientific classification
- Kingdom: Plantae
- Clade: Tracheophytes
- Clade: Angiosperms
- Clade: Eudicots
- Clade: Rosids
- Order: Fabales
- Family: Quillajaceae
- Genus: Quillaja
- Species: Q. brasiliensis

Binomial name
- Quillaja brasiliensis (A. St.-Hil. & Tul.) Mart. 1843

= Quillaja brasiliensis =

Species of flowering plant

Quillaja brasiliensis is a plant of the genus Quillaja native to Brazil.
