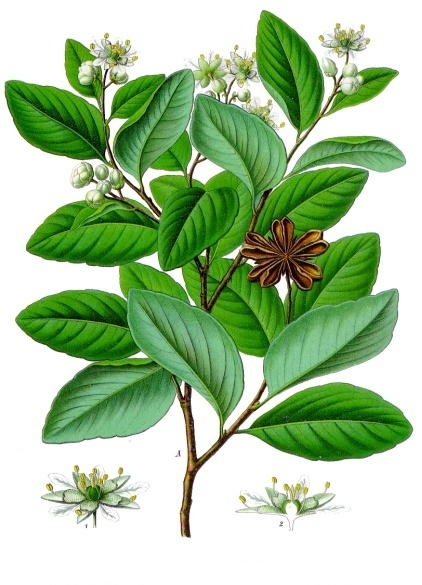
- Quillaja saponaria

Scientific classification
- Kingdom: Plantae
- Clade: Tracheophytes
- Clade: Angiosperms
- Clade: Eudicots
- Clade: Rosids
- Order: Fabales
- Family: Quillajaceae
- Genus: Quillaja; Molina

Species
- See text
- Distribution of the Quillajaceae

Synonyms
- Fontenellea A.St.-Hil. & Tul.

= Quillaja =

Genus of flowering plants

Quillaja is a genus of flowering plants, the only extant genus in the family Quillajaceae with two or three known species. It was once thought to be in the rose family, Rosaceae, but recent research shows it belongs in its own family. The inner bark of the soap bark tree (Q. saponaria) contains saponin, which is a natural soap. Members of this genus are trees that grow to about 25 metres (82 ft).

== Species ==
The species were revised by Federico Luebert in 2014:

Image	Name	Distribution
	Quillaja brasiliensis (A.St.-Hil. & Tul.) Mart.	Brazil
	Quillaja saponaria Molina	central Chile in the forests of La Campana National Park and Cerro La Campana
