= QS-21 =

Plant extract

Basic structure of QS-21, consisting of a quillaic acid triterpene (black) substituted with a branched trisaccharide (blue) and a linear tetrasaccharide (green), which is in turn connected to an acyl chain (red) via a hydrolytically labile ester. QS-21 is a 65:35 mixture of the Apiose- and the Xylose-substituted variants of above molecule.

QS-21 is a chromatographic purified fraction out of a plant extract used as a vaccine adjuvant. It is derived from the soap bark tree (Quillaja saponaria), which is native of Chile. The crude drug (Quillajae cortex, Quillaia) is extracted and purified form imported bark coming from Chile.

The extract contains water-soluble triterpene glycosides, which are members of a family of plant-based compounds called saponins. It has been tested as an adjuvant in various vaccines in attempts to improve their efficacy. It enhance both humoral and cell-mediated immunity.

== Use ==
QS-21 has been clinically evaluated as a vaccine adjuvant. As of 2002, it had been tested in more than 3000 patients in 60 clinical trials.

Direct, unencapsulated QS-21 is considered toxic. It also causes immediate pain at injection site and, in vitro, causes hemolysis. All of these can be prevented by packaging QS-21 into lipid-based particles, which also have the added advantage of targeting its delivery to phagocytes. It is part of:

- AS-01 (also known as AS01_{E}), GSK's adjuvant used in the Shingrix vaccine, the RTS,S vaccine, and the M72/AS01E vaccine. AS-01 consists of QS-21 and 3-O-desacyl-4'-monophosphoryl lipid A (MPL) sealed inside cholestrol-based liposomes.
- Army Liposome Formulation Q (ALFQ), MPL and QS-21 sealed inside cholesterol-based liposomes produced by the US Army. Designed to be unencumbered by AS-01 patents, it was created in 2019 by enhancing the existing, MPL-based Army Liposome Formulation (ALF) with QS-21.
- Matrix-M, Novavax's adjuvant used in the Novavax COVID-19 vaccine. Matrix-M contains a mixture of soapbark saponins sealed in nanoparticles made of cholesterol and phospholipid; one of these saponins is QS-21.
- Immune-stimulating complex (ISCOM) of 1984 and ISCOMATRIX (CSL Limited, 2012), two forerunners to Matrix-M

== Sources ==
=== Tree bark ===
Isolation of QS-21 coming from undiscriminated Quillja debarking destroys the soap bark tree, prompting governments to regulate industrial extraction. The United States has invoked the 1950 Defense Production Act to preserve vaccine raw materials for its own companies. The protection and management of native forests in Chile (including quillay) is mainly governed by Law No. 20.283 on Native Forest Recovery and Forestry Promotion, whose application and oversight correspond to the state forestry agency (historically CONAF, now SERNAFOR (National Forestry Service)).

A semi-synthesis strategy from 2013 relies on purifying the prosapogenin (triterpene and branched trisaccharide) part of the molecule and adding the rest of QS-21 synthetically, doubling the yield over simple isolation (amount produced from a given amount of tree bark). This semi-synthetic approach has also facilitated experimentation with alternative acyl chain compositions.

In 2017, FDA approved the Shingrix vaccine which makes use of the extracted form of QS-21 made by Agenus under the trade name Stimulon. Agenus remains the sole US manufacturer of FDA-approved QS-21 as of 2021.

=== Sustainable biomass pruning ===
Saponins, including QS-21, are present throughout the biomass of Quillaja saponaria Mol., though typically at lower concentrations in the branches, trunk, and leaves compared to the bark. However, these non-bark components represent a significantly larger biomass volume and thus contribute a higher total yield of saponins. The practice of pruning Quillaja trees to harvest this biomass for saponin extraction has been used sustainably by the food industry since 2000. In 2022, the company Q-Vant communicated having achieved the fractioning of QS-21 from any part of the Quillaja plant, including branches and trunks obtained through renewable pruning methods. Recently the company Desert King, which is the supplier for all approved human vaccines containing QS-21, published that an appropriate management of wild Quillaja forests can sustain kilogram-scale QS-21 purification, while clonal plantation forestry will be the future most practical and scalable strategy. Alternative approaches, including plant cell culture, engineered microorganisms, and chemical synthesis, remain scientifically promising but currently face technical and economic limitations for large-scale pharmaceutical production.

=== Plant tissue culture ===
Several companies have succeeded in isolating the compound from plant tissue cultures of the soapbark plant.

The aforementioned Agenus created a spin-off company called SaponiQx to manage its QS-21 business. SaponiQx submitted the Master File for its cultured plant cell (cpc) version of QS-21 to the US FDA in 2023. An animal study using this cpc-QS-21 was published in 2024.

=== Transgenic tobacco ===
In 2024, a team at the John Innes Centre in Norwich, UK identified the complete 20-step biosynthetic pathway of QS-21 and cloned it into tobacco.

=== Transgenic yeast ===
In 2024, an international team of collaborators succeed in engineering yeast to perform the complete biosynthesis of QS-21. One of the scientists pointed out that the yeast process is around 1000 times faster than trees because only mature trees produce QS-21. "Even at the levels we're producing it, it's cheaper than producing it from the plant."

=== Total synthesis ===
QS-21 has been made by total chemical synthesis, but required an inefficient 76-step process that is not commercially viable. This is not unlike the total chemical synthesis of many other complex biomolecules, which served mainly to confirm their structure rather than to produce an economically-viable source.
