= M72/AS01E =

Experimental tuberculosis vaccine

M72/AS01_{E}
Vaccine description
- Target: Mycobacterium tuberculosis
- Vaccine type: Subunit

Legal status
- Legal status: investigational (in phase III)

M72/AS01_{E} is an experimental tuberculosis vaccine. If approved, it would be the first vaccine for tuberculosis in more than a century after the BCG vaccine.

The vaccine consists of two main ingredients. The antigen part is M72, a recombinant fusion protein derived from the sequences of two M. tuberculosis antigens (Mtb32A O07175 and Mtb39A L7N675). The adjuvant part is AS01_{E}, a combination of QS-21, cholesterol, and monophosphoryl lipid A (MPL).

It was initially developed by GSK plc and funded by non-profits and governments due to the limited commercial potential of tuberculosis vaccines, which are mainly needed in poor countries. The vaccine candidate completed a Phase II clinical trial in 2018, but its development was stalled thereafter due to negotiations between GSK, which was uninterested in the late stage development of the vaccine candidate, and non-commercial backers. After almost two years, the company concluded an agreement with the Bill & Melinda Gates Medical Research Institute. The Phase III trial is funded by the Wellcome Trust (up to US$150 million) and the Gates Foundation (the remaining around US$400 million). It is currently ongoing since 2024 and planned to be completed by 2029. One issue in developing the vaccine is the need for QS-21 bark extract from the tree Quillaja saponaria that is used in combination with monophosphoryl lipid A as an immunologic adjuvant. This adjuvant is used by several other GSK vaccines—especially the shingles vaccine that is more profitable—and GSK owns most of the world's supply.
