= Glycosynthase =

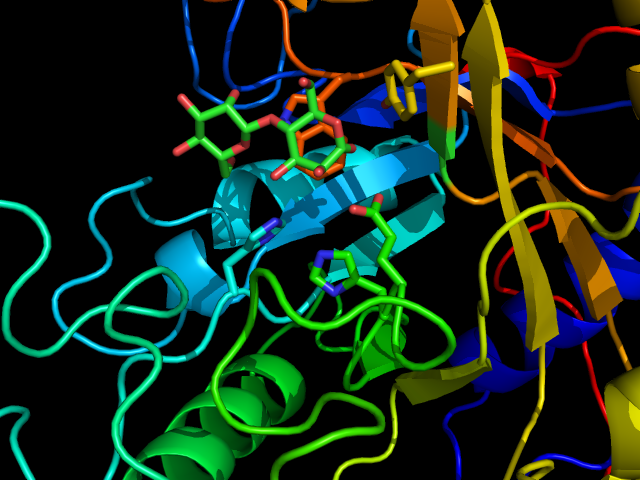
Mutant endomannase with bound mannodiose, 1ODZ, a glycosynthase

The term glycosynthase refers to a class of proteins that have been engineered to catalyze the formation of a glycosidic bond. Glycosynthase are derived from glycosidase enzymes, which catalyze the hydrolysis of glycosidic bonds. They were traditionally formed from retaining glycosidase by mutating the active site nucleophilic amino acid (usually an aspartate or glutamate) to a small non-nucleophilic amino acid (usually alanine or glycine). More modern approaches use directed evolution to screen for amino acid substitutions that enhance glycosynthase activity.

== The first glycosynthase ==
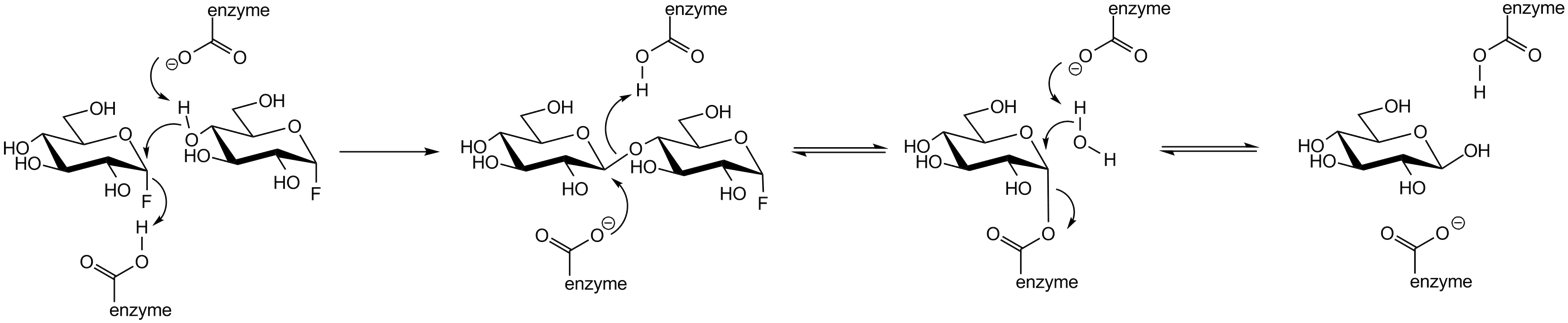
Two discoveries led to the development of glycosynthase enzymes. The first was that a change of the active site nucleophile of a glycosidase from a carboxylate to another amino acid resulted in a properly folded protein that had no hydrolase activity. The second discovery was that some glycosidase enzymes were able to catalyze the hydrolysis of glycosyl fluorides that had the incorrect anomeric configuration. The enzymes underwent a transglycosidation reaction to form a disaccharide, which was then a substrate for hydrolase activity.

The first reported glycosynthase was a mutant of the Agrobacterium sp. β-glucosidase / galactosidase in which the nucleophile glutamate 358 was mutated to an alanine by site directed mutagenesis. When incubated with α-glycosyl fluorides and an acceptor sugar it was found to catalyze the transglycosidation reaction without any hydrolysis. This glycosynthase was used to synthesize a series of di- and trisaccharide products with yields between 64% and 92%.

== Reaction mechanism ==
The mechanism of a glycosynthase is similar to the hydrolysis reaction of retaining glycosidases except no covalent-enzyme intermediate is formed. Mutation of the active site nucleophile to a non-nucleophilic amino acid prevents the formation of a covalent intermediate. An activated glycosyl donor with a good anomeric-leaving group (often a fluorine) is required. The leaving group is displaced by an alcohol of the acceptor sugar aided by the active site general base amino acid of the enzyme.

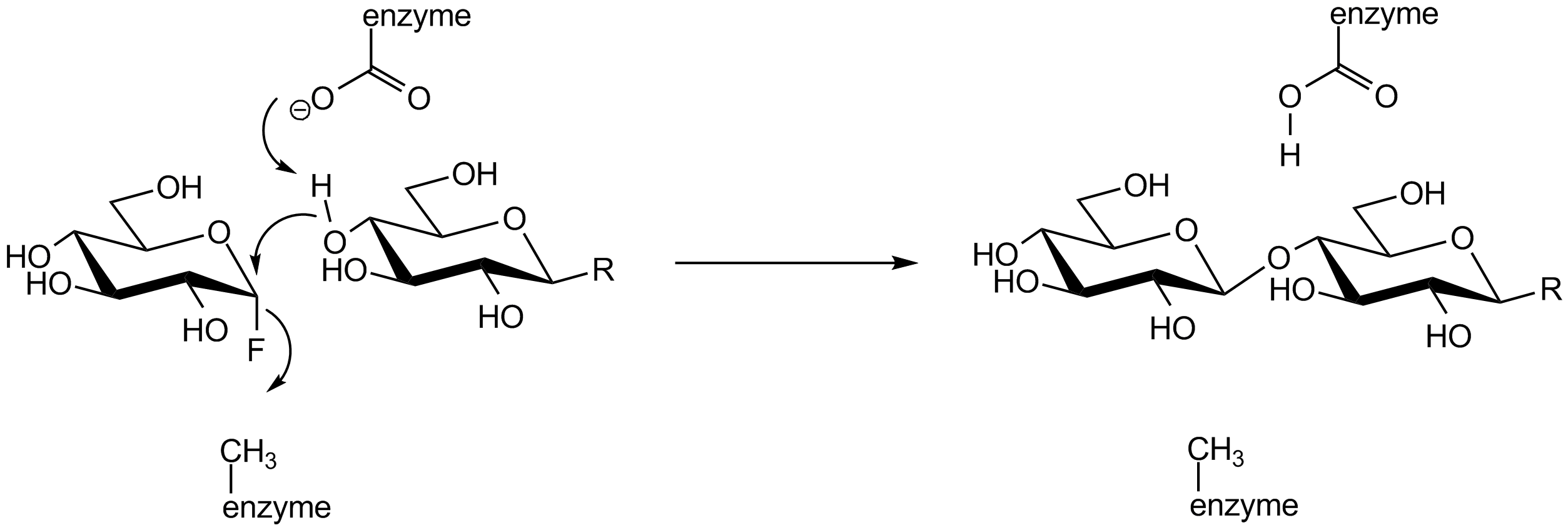

== Modern extensions ==
The first glycosynthase was a retaining exoglycosidase that catalyzed the formation of β 1-4 linked glycosides of glucose and galactose. Glycosynthase enzymes have since been expanded to include mutants of endoglycosidase, as well as mutants of inverting glycosidase. Substrates of glycosynthase include glucose, galactose, mannose, xylose, and glucuronic acid. Modern methods to prepare glycosynthase use directed evolution to introduce modifications, which improve the enzymes function. This process was made available due to the development of high throughput screens for glycosynthase activity.

== Limitations ==
Glycosynthase have been useful for the preparation of oligosaccharides; however, their use suffers from certain limitations. First, glycosynthase can only be used to synthesize glycosidic linkages for which there is a known glycosidase. That glycosidase must also be first converted into a glycosynthase, which is not always possible. Second, the product of the glycosynthase reaction is often a better substrate for the glycosynthase then the starting material, resulting in the formation of multiple products of varying lengths. Finally, glycosynthase are specific for the donor sugar but often have loose specificity for the acceptor sugar. This can result in different regioselectivity depending on the acceptor resulting in products with different glycosidic linkages. One example is the Agrobacterium sp. β-glucosynthase, which forms a β-1,4-glycoside with glucose as the acceptor, but forms a β-1,3-glycoside with xylose as the acceptor.

== See also ==
- Glucosidase
- Glycoside hydrolase family 1
