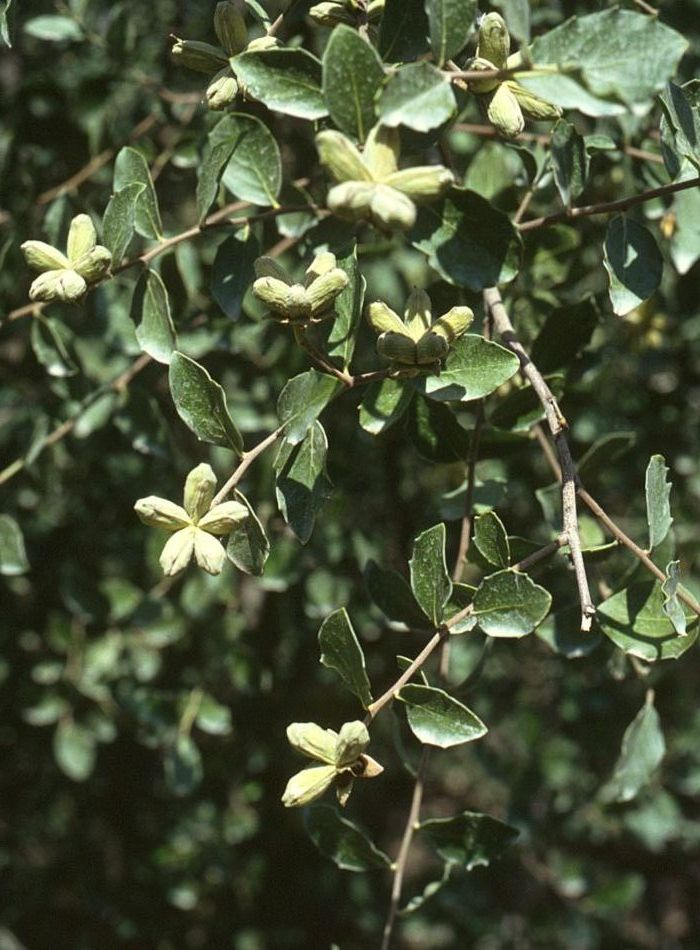

Conservation status
- Least Concern (IUCN 3.1)

Scientific classification
- Kingdom: Plantae
- Clade: Embryophytes
- Clade: Tracheophytes
- Clade: Angiosperms
- Clade: Eudicots
- Clade: Rosids
- Order: Fabales
- Family: Quillajaceae
- Genus: Quillaja
- Species: Q. saponaria

Binomial name
- Quillaja saponaria Molina

= Quillaja saponaria =

Soap bark tree

Species of plant

Quillaja saponaria, the soap bark tree or soapbark, is an evergreen tree in the family Quillajaceae, native to warm temperate central Chile. In Chile it occurs from 32 to 40° South Latitude approximately and at up to 2000 m (6500 ft) above sea level. It can grow to 15–20 m (50–65 ft) in height. The tree has thick, dark bark; smooth, leathery, shiny, oval evergreen leaves 3–5 cm long; white star-shaped flowers 15 mm in diameter borne in dense corymbs; and a dry fruit with five follicles each containing 10–20 seeds. The tree has several practical and commercial uses.

== Habitat ==
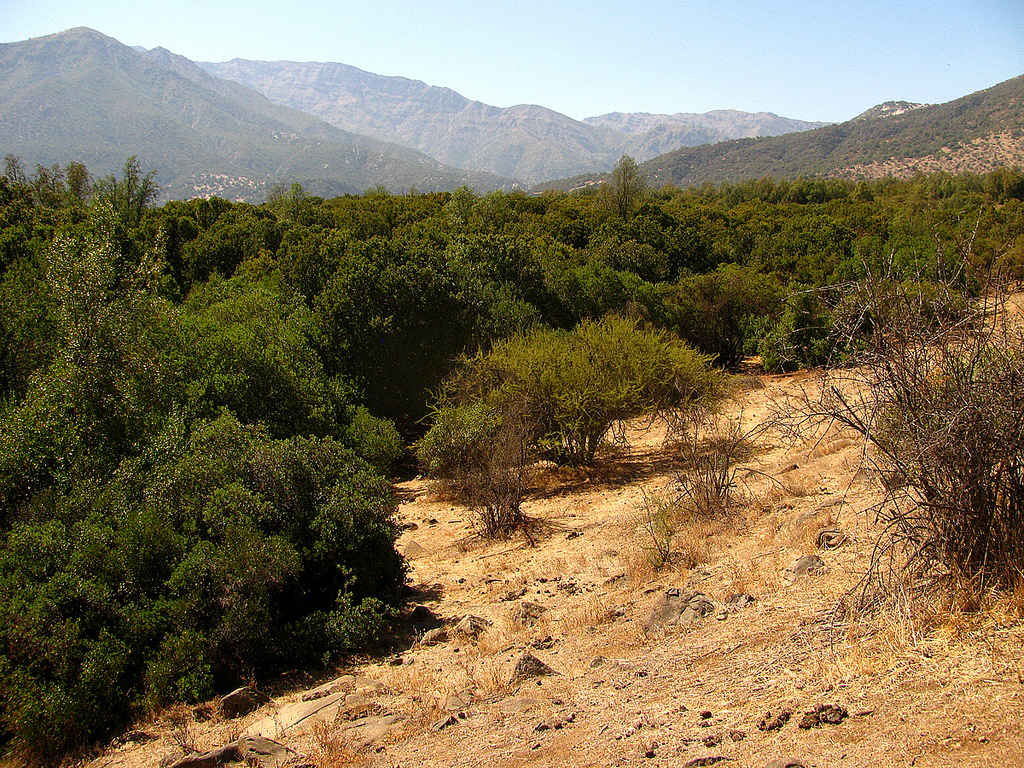
Sclerophyll forests in the Santiago Metropolitan Region in Chile

This tree occurs at elevations up to 2000 metres. The species is drought resistant, and tolerates about −12 °C (10 °F) in its natural habitat. Examples of specific occurrences are in central Chile in the forests of La Campana National Park and Cerro La Campana, in which locales it is associated with the Chilean wine palm, Jubaea chilensis. It is often used for reforestation on arid soils.

The plant has been introduced as an ornamental in California, and has been acclimatized in Spain but is rarely cultivated there.

== Taxonomy ==
Quillaja saponaria was originally described in 1782 by Juan Ignacio Molina.

== Etymology ==
Quillaja is derived from the indigenous Mapuche name küllay, which means soap, and the Chilean vernacular name for this species, culay.

Saponaria means 'soap-like'.

== Uses ==
The wood is used in cabinetry, and scents derived from the tree are used in perfumes and cosmetics. The inner bark of Quillaja saponaria can be reduced to powder and employed as a substitute for soap, since it forms a lather with water, owing to the presence of a glycoside saponin, sometimes distinguished as quillaia saponin. The same, or a closely similar substance, is found in soapwort (Saponaria officinalis), in senega root (Polygala senega) and in sarsaparilla; it appears to be chemically related to digitonin, which occurs in digitalis.

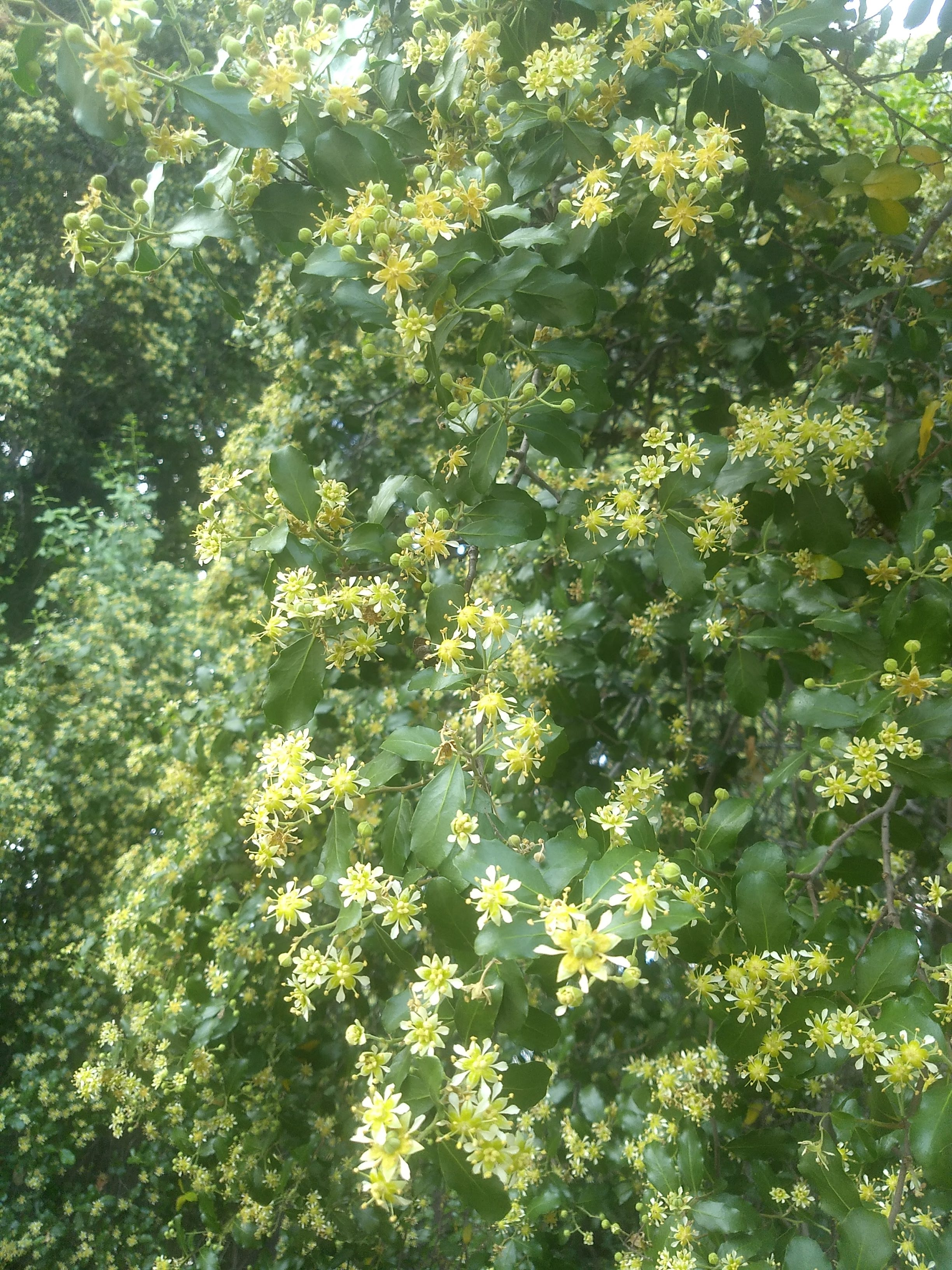
Quillaja saponaria in bloom, University of California, Berkeley, US, July 2019 (by Amber Kerr)

=== Uses of the saponins ===
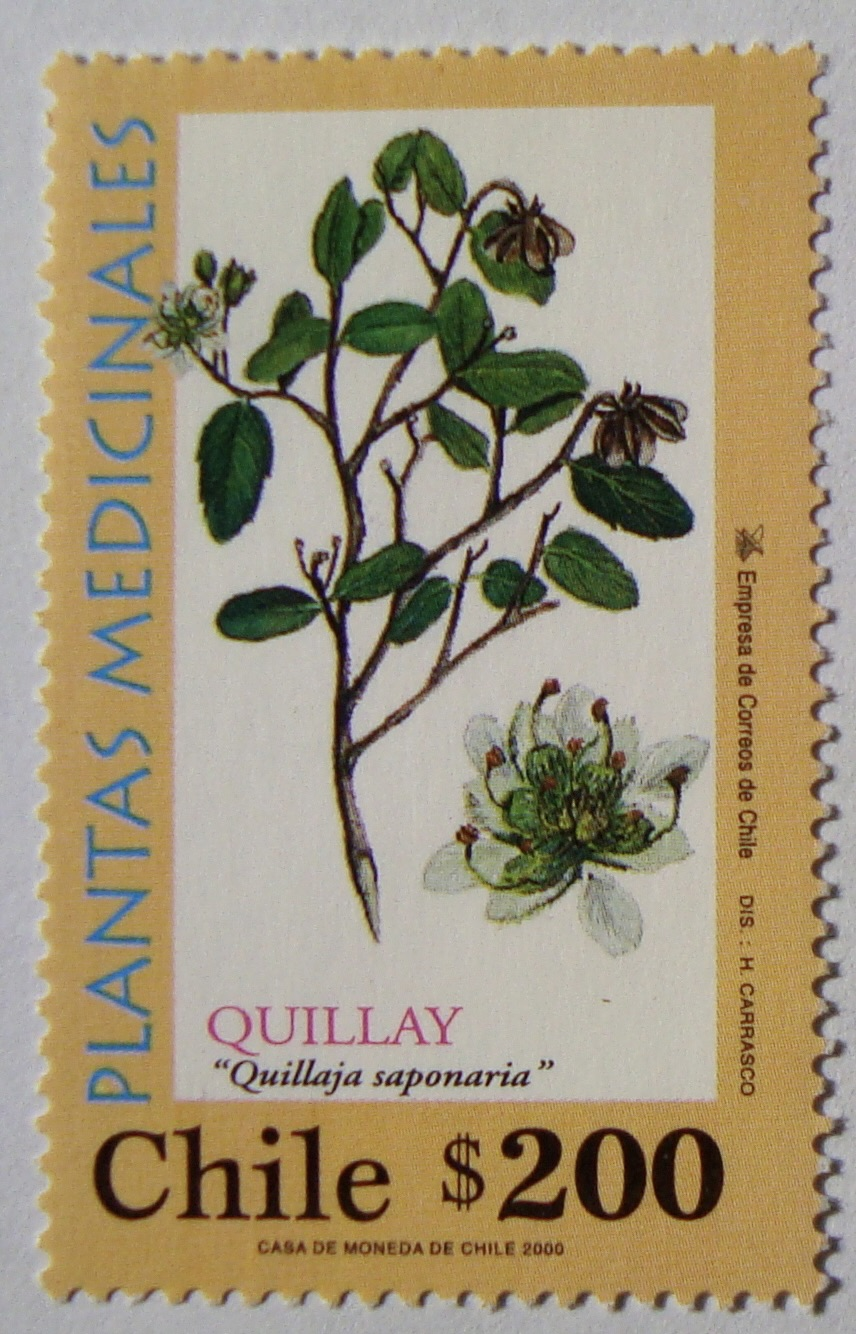
Q. saponaria in a Chilean medicinal plant postage stamp series

Soap bark tree has a long history of medicinal use with the Andean people who used it as a treatment for various chest problems. The saponin content of the bark helps to stimulate the production of a more watery mucus in the airways, thus facilitating the removal of phlegm through coughing. The bark is the source of quillaia, the extract of which is used as a food additive and as an ingredient in pharmaceuticals, pesticides, personal care products, fire-fighting foam, and applied as an agricultural spray adjuvant. It is used as an additive in photographic films and as a foaming agent for drinks.

The saponins in Quillaja Extract are also used as the active ingredient in commercial pesticides to inhibit the growth of pathogenic fungi and nematodes in ornamental plants, food crops and turfgrass.

The saponins of this tree are also considered to have adjuvant properties for vaccine solutions, and have been used for this purpose since 2017. QS21 adjuvant is a saponin (triterpenoid glycoside) obtainable from Quillaja saponaria extract. The Novavax vaccine for COVID-19 uses this adjuvant, the zoster vaccine Shingrix also contains QS21 as well as the RSV vaccine Arexvy.

=== Toxicity ===
First described by Edwin John Quekett, Q. saponaria wood and bark is known to contain raphides, which George Gulliver found were concentrated along the liber and mesophloeum.

== Sources ==
- C. Donoso. 2005. Árboles nativos de Chile. Guía de reconocimiento. Edición 4. Marisa Cuneo Ediciones, Valdivia, Chile. 136p.
- Encyclopedia of the Chilean Flora. 2009. Quillaja saponaria
- Gulliver, George (1864). "Observations on Raphides and other Crystals". The Annals and Magazine of Natural History, Including Zoology, Botany, and Geology. Third Series. 14: 250–252.
- Adriana Hoffmann. 1998. Flora Silvestre de Chile, Zona Central. Edición 4. Fundación Claudio Gay, Santiago. 254p.
- C. Michael Hogan. 2008. Chilean Wine Palm: Jubaea chilensis, GlobalTwitcher.com, ed. Nicklas Stromberg
- J. Taylor. 1990. The Milder Garden. Dent
- Chevallier, Andrew, 1996. The Encyclopedia of Medicinal Plants, Dorling Kindersley, 336p.
- Singh, Manmohan, 2007. Vaccine Adjuvants and Delivery Systems, John Wiley & Sons, Hoboken, New Jersey, 457 pp.
