= Saponin =

Class of plant-derived organic compounds with soap-like properties

Saponins (Latin sapon, 'soap' + -in, 'one of') are bitter-tasting, usually toxic plant-derived secondary metabolites. They are organic chemicals that become foamy when agitated in water and have high molecular weight. They are present in a wide range of plant species throughout the bark, leaves, stems, roots and flowers but particularly in soapwort (genus Saponaria), a flowering plant, the soapbark tree (Quillaja saponaria), common corn-cockle (Agrostemma githago L.), baby's breath (Gypsophila spp.) and soybeans (Glycine max L.). They are used in soaps, medicines (e.g., drug adjuvants), fire extinguishers, dietary supplements, steroid synthesis, and in carbonated beverages (for example, being responsible for maintaining the head on root beer). Saponins are both water and fat soluble, which gives them their useful soap properties. Some examples of these chemicals are glycyrrhizin (licorice flavoring) and quillaia (alt. quillaja), a bark extract used in beverages.

== Classification based on chemical structure ==
Structurally, saponins are glycosides with at least one glycosidic linkage between a sugar chain (glycone) and another non-sugar organic molecule (aglycone). The resulting saponin can be classified by the particular moieties in each case.

=== Classification by aglycone ===
The aglycone moiety of the saponin encompasses the lipophilic portion of the compound and is sometimes referred to as the sapogenin. It is typically divided into the steroidal and triterpenoid groups.

==== Steroid glycosides ====
Steroid glycosides are saponins with 27-C atoms. They are modified triterpenoids where their aglycone is a steroid, these compounds typically consist of a steroid aglycone attached to one or more sugar molecules, which can have various biological activities. These compounds are known for their significant cytotoxic, neurotrophic and antibacterial properties. These may also be used for partial synthesis of sex hormones or steroids.

Steroid glycosides have been further divided into spirostanol and furostanol saponins. The spirostane skeleton consists of a five-ring structure, with an additional sixth ring containing C22-26; meanwhile, the furostane skeleton consists of a five-ring structure, wherein C22-26 is an open chain and C26 possesses a hydroxyl group which is often engaged in a glycosidic linkage. However, this additional subcategorisation has been criticised as emphasising secondary biotransformations instead of reflecting the main biosynthetic pathways.

==== Triterpenoid glycosides ====
Triterpenoid glycosides are natural glycosides present in various plants, herbs and sea cucumbers and possess 30-C atoms. These compounds consist of a triterpenoid aglycone attached to one or more sugar molecules. Triterpenoid glycosides exhibit a wide range of biological activities and pharmacological properties, making them valuable in traditional medicine and modern drug discovery.

The triterpenoid aglycone is frequently subdivided into oleanane, ursolic acid, and dammarane.

=== Classification by glycone ===
Saponins can also be categorised by the number of sugar units they contain. These are monodesmosides (one sugar unit, usually at C3), didesmosides (two sugar units, the second at C26 or C28), and tridesmosides (three sugar units, at C3, C26, and C28). These sugars are most often combinations of D-glucose (Glc), D-galactose (Gal), L-arabinose (Ara), L-rhamnose (Rha), D-xylose (Xyl), D-fructose (Fuc), and glucuronic acid (GlcA).

=== Classification of similar molecules ===
Other compounds which exhibit saponin-like functions, structures, or biosyntheses have also been considered within the saponin classification.

==== Glycosteroidalkaloids ====
These compounds share a very similar skeleton to steroidal saponins, but contain instead or in addition a nitrogen atom. Although glycosteroidalkaloids and saponins share the same biosynthetic ancestors and contain a steroid-type skeleton glycosidically linked to monosaccharide moieties, this difference is enough to classify them as a different group.

== Uses ==
The saponins are a subclass of terpenoids, the largest class of plant extracts. The amphipathic nature of saponins gives them activity as surfactants with potential ability to interact with cell membrane components, such as cholesterol and phospholipids, possibly making saponins useful for development of cosmetics and drugs. Saponins have also been used as adjuvants in development of vaccines, such as QS-21, Matrix-M, and Quil A, an extract from the bark of Quillaja saponaria. This makes them of interest for possible use in subunit vaccines and vaccines directed against intracellular pathogens. In their use as adjuvants for manufacturing vaccines, toxicity associated with sterol complexation remains a concern.

Quillaja is toxic when consumed in large amounts, involving possible liver damage, gastric pain, diarrhea, or other adverse effects. The NOAEL of saponins is around 300 mg/kg in rodents, so a dose of 3 mg/kg should be safe with a safety factor (see Therapeutic index) of 100.

Saponins are used for their effects on ammonia emissions in animal feeding. In the United States, researchers are exploring the use of saponins derived from plants to control invasive worm species, including the jumping worm.

Saponin's ability to lyse cell membrane components makes it useful in science when working with intracellular organisms. It is the most widely utilized reagent in isolating parasites in Plasmodium research. Clinical laboratories also regularly utilize saponin to isolate many organisms in blood cultures.

== Decoction ==
The principal historical use of these plants was boiling down to make soap. Saponaria officinalis is most suited for this procedure, but other related species also work. The greatest concentration of saponin occurs during flowering, with the most saponin found in the woody stems and roots, but the leaves also contain some.

== Biological sources ==
Saponins have historically been plant-derived, but they have also been isolated from marine animals such as sea cucumber. They derive their name from the soapwort plant (genus Saponaria, family Caryophyllaceae), the root of which was used historically as a soap. In other representatives of this family, e.g. Agerostemma githago, Gypsophila spp., and Dianthus sp., saponins are also present in large quantities. Saponins are also found in the botanical family Sapindaceae, including its defining genus Sapindus (soapberry or soapnut) and the horse chestnut, and in the closely related families Aceraceae (maples) and Hippocastanaceae. It is also found heavily in Gynostemma pentaphyllum (Cucurbitaceae) in a form called gypenosides, and ginseng or red ginseng (Panax, Araliaceae) in a form called ginsenosides. Saponins are also found in the unripe fruit of Manilkara zapota (also known as sapodillas), resulting in highly astringent properties. Nerium oleander (Apocynaceae), also known as White Oleander, is a source of the potent cardiac toxin oleandrin. Within these families, this class of chemical compounds is found in various parts of the plant: leaves, stems, roots, bulbs, blossom and fruit. Commercial formulations of plant-derived saponins, e.g., from the soap bark tree, Quillaja saponaria, and those from other sources are available via controlled manufacturing processes, which make them of use as chemical and biomedical reagents. Soyasaponins are a group of structurally complex oleanane-type triterpenoid saponins that include soyasapogenol (aglycone) and oligosaccharide moieties biosynthesized on soybean tissues. Soyasaponins were previously associated to plant-microbe interactions from root exudates and abiotic stresses, as nutritional deficiency.

== Role in plant ecology and impact on animal foraging ==
In plants, saponins may serve as anti-feedants, and to protect the plant against microbes and fungi. Some plant saponins (e.g., from oat and spinach) may enhance nutrient absorption and aid in animal digestion. However, saponins are often bitter to taste, and so can reduce plant palatability (e.g., in livestock feeds), or even imbue them with life-threatening animal toxicity. Some saponins are toxic to cold-blooded organisms and insects at particular concentrations. Further research is needed to define the roles of these natural products in their host organisms, which have been described as "poorly understood" to date.

== Ethnobotany ==
Most saponins, which readily dissolve in water, are poisonous to fish. Therefore, in ethnobotany, they are known for their use by indigenous people in obtaining aquatic food sources. Since prehistoric times, cultures throughout the world have used fish-killing plants, typically containing saponins, for fishing.

Although prohibited by law, fish-poison plants are still widely used by indigenous tribes in Guyana.

On the Indian subcontinent, the Gondi people use poison-plant extracts in fishing.

In the 16th century, a saponins-rich plant, Agrostemma githago, was used to treat ulcers, fistulas, and hemorrhages.

Many of California's Native American tribes traditionally used soaproot (genus Chlorogalum), and/or the root of various yucca species, which contain saponin, as a fish poison. They would pulverize the roots, mix with water to generate a foam, then put the suds into a stream. This would kill or incapacitate the fish, which could be gathered easily from the surface of the water. Among the tribes using this technique were the Lassik, the Luiseño, and the Mattole.

== Chemical structure ==
Chemical structure of solanine, a highly toxic alkaloid saponin found in the nightshade family. The lipophilic steroidal structure is the series of connected six- and five-atom rings at the right of the structure, while the hydrophilic chain of sugar units is to the left and below. Note the nitrogen atom in the steroid skeleton at right, indicating this compound is a glycoalkaloid.

The vast heterogeneity of structures underlying this class of compounds makes generalizations difficult; they're a subclass of terpenoids, oxygenated derivatives of terpene hydrocarbons. Terpenes in turn are formally made up of five-carbon isoprene units (The alternate steroid base is a terpene missing a few carbon atoms). Derivatives are formed by substituting other groups for some of the hydrogen atoms of the base structure. In the case of most saponins, one of these substituents is a sugar, so the compound is a glycoside of the base molecule.

More specifically, the lipophilic base structure of a saponin can be a triterpene, a steroid (such as spirostanol or furostanol) or a steroidal alkaloid (in which nitrogen atoms replace one or more carbon atoms). Alternatively, the base structure may be an acyclic carbon chain rather than the ring structure typical of steroids. One or two (rarely three) hydrophilic monosaccharide (simple sugar) units bind to the base structure via their hydroxyl (OH) groups. In some cases other substituents are present, such as carbon chains bearing hydroxyl or carboxyl groups. Such chain structures may be 1–11 carbon atoms long, but are usually 2–5 carbons long; the carbon chains themselves may be branched or unbranched.

The most commonly encountered sugars are monosaccharides like glucose and galactose, though a wide variety of sugars occurs naturally. Other kinds of molecules such as organic acids may also attach to the base, by forming esters via their carboxyl (COOH) groups. Of particular note among these are sugar acids such as glucuronic acid and galacturonic acid, which are oxidized forms of glucose and galactose.

== See also ==
- Cardenolide
- Cardiac glycoside
- Phytochemical
