= Glycosylamine =

Glycosyl group attached to an amino group

Cyclic hemiaminal ether bond derived from an aldehyde

Glycosylamines are a class of biochemical compounds consisting of a glycosyl group attached to an amino group, -NR_{2}. They are also known as N-glycosides, as they are a type of glycoside. Glycosyl groups can be derived from carbohydrates. The glycosyl group and amino group are connected with a β-N-glycosidic bond, forming a cyclic hemiaminal ether bond (α-aminoether).

Examples include nucleosides such as adenosine.

== Roles of Glycosylamines ==
Glycosylamine has many roles in biochemistry, such as synthesis in pharmaceutical compounds and forming enzymes, but one of the most important is to play as intermediates in biosignaling.

Carbohydrates function in important biological events, such as glycolysis, signal transduction, and other biochemical pathways. Glycosylamine is a sugar-related derivative where the anomeric oxygen of Glycoside has been replaced by nitrogen. They are specifically known for being small N-glycosyl mimics of glycosides, which aid in blocking enzymes that act on glycosides. Some of the N-glycosyl compounds undergo mutarotation, where they reorder themselves to an tautomeric open-chain imine. Then, they react with many carbon nucleophiles to yield 1,2-syn or 1,2-antiaminoalditols as products. 1,2-syn or 1,2-anti aminoalditols are stereoisomeric derivatives of alditols and they are made by adding carbon nucleophiles to chemical compounds that have nitrogen/carbon double bonds, which are also known as Imines.

Iminosugars function as a crucial class of carbohydrate mimics, but they are unstable. However, iminosugar-C-glycosides are very stable and they can inhibit many glycosidases, and one of its most significant methodological application is the addition of C-Nu to N-glycosylamines. When creating imino-C-glycosyl compounds, the N-tert-butanesulfinyl glycosylamines are a more flexible artificial intermediate and have contributed to the stability of the molecule.

Another one of glycosylamine's roles in biochemistry is to act as an intermediate in the Maillard reaction. That reaction is what happens when amino acids and reducing sugars interact as food gets heated at higher temperatures. Initially, the carbonyl of a reducing sugar and amino group of an amino acid react together as a condensation reaction, leaving N-glycosylamine as a product and that gets dehydrated to create a Schiff base.

A Schiff base can rearrange into an Amadori rearrangement compound, which is a more stable compound. The molecules that are a part of this arrangement can exist as glycosylamines or open-chain Schiff bases, and they get converted to 1-deoxy-2-keto-sugar derivatives primarily through N-glycosylamino acids.

The nucleoside adenosine
