= Quillaia =

Natural bark extract used in food and medicine

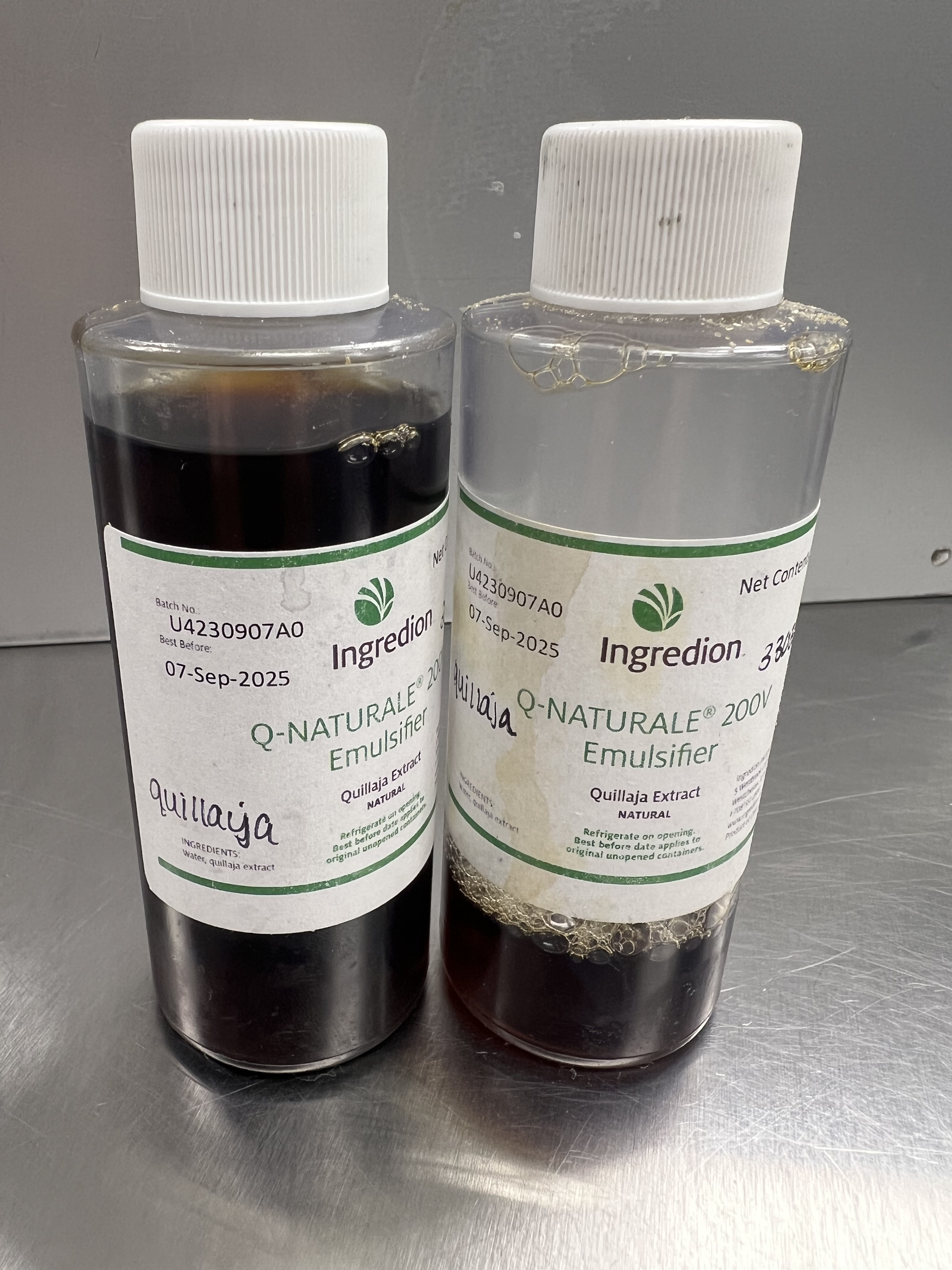

Quillaia is the milled inner bark or small stems and branches of the soapbark (Quillaja saponaria). Other names include Murillo bark extract, Panama bark extract, Quillaia extract, Quillay bark extract, Soapbark extract, and Quillajae cortex. Quillaia contains high concentrations of saponins that can be increased further by processing. Highly purified saponins from quillaia bark are used as adjuvants to enhance the effectiveness of vaccines. Other compounds in the crude extract include tannins and other polyphenols, and calcium oxalate.

Quillaia is used in the manufacture of food additives. The extract also is used as a humectant in baked goods, frozen dairy products, and puddings and as a foaming agent in soft drinks. It is used in agriculture for some "natural" spray adjuvant formulations.

== Use in medicine ==
The saponins from Quillaja saponaria are used in several approved veterinary vaccines (e.g., foot-and-mouth disease vaccines). Initially a crude preparation was used, but more recently purified products have been developed. Two of these (Quil A and Matrix-M) have been shown to be more effective and cause less local irritation.

Quil A is still a mixture of more than 25 different saponin molecules. One of them, the saponin QS21, has been investigated for as an adjuvant for human vaccines.

Novavax uses a highly purified quillaja extract as an adjuvant in its veterinary and human vaccines. The adjuvant, Matrix-M, is made at facilities in Sweden and Denmark.
