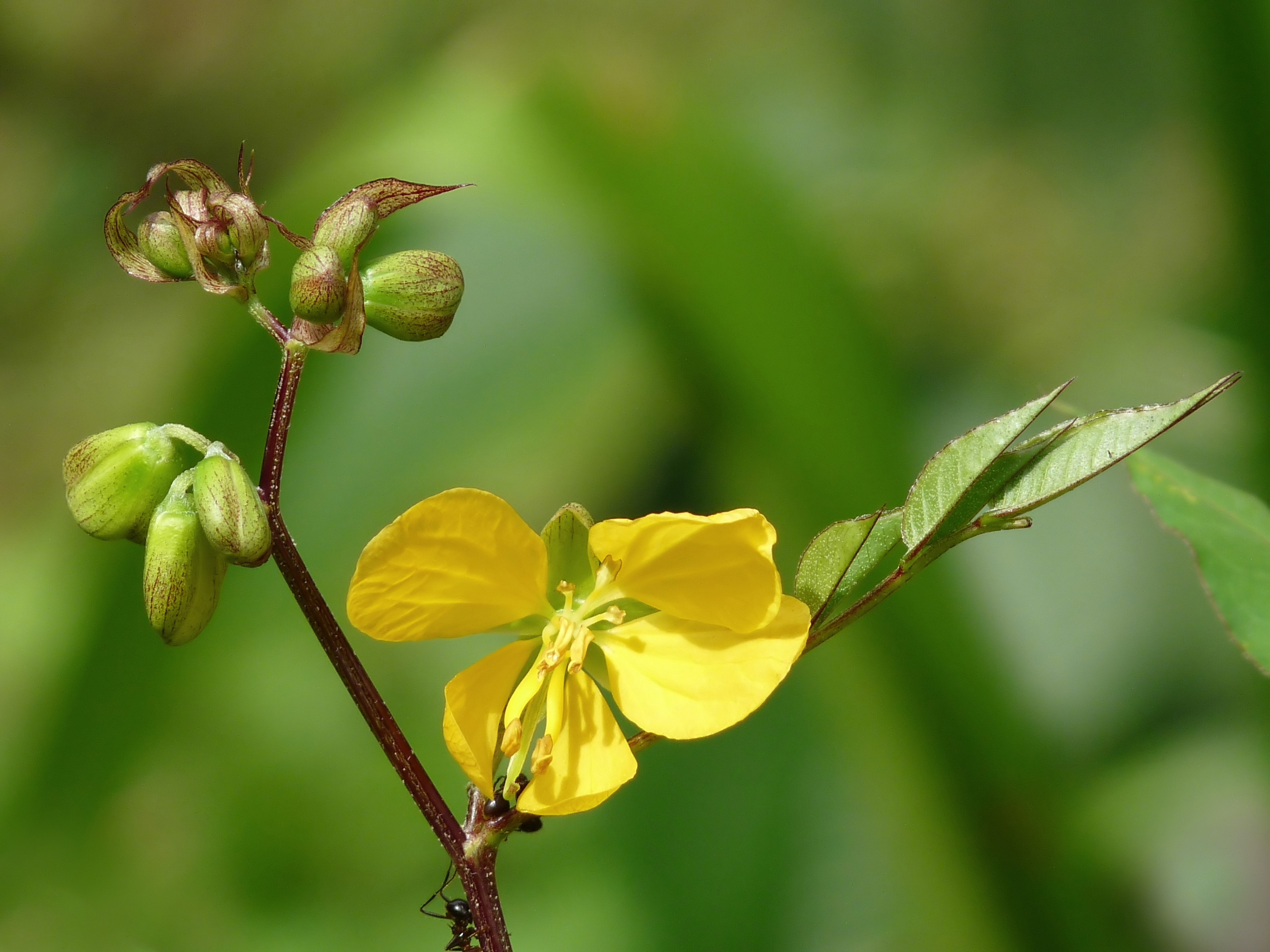

Scientific classification
- Kingdom: Plantae
- Clade: Embryophytes
- Clade: Tracheophytes
- Clade: Spermatophytes
- Clade: Angiosperms
- Clade: Eudicots
- Clade: Rosids
- Clade: Fabids
- Order: Fabales; Bromhead

Families
- Fabaceae (legumes); Quillajaceae; Polygalaceae (milkwort family); Surianaceae

Synonyms
- Caesalpiniales Martius; Cassiales Link; Mimosales Link; Polygalales Berchtold & J. Presl; Quillajales Doweld; Surianales Doweld

= Fabales =

Fabales Temporal range: Albian-Recent

Order of flowering plants in the dicots

Fabales is an order of flowering plants included in the rosid group of the eudicots in the Angiosperm Phylogeny Group II classification system. In the APG II circumscription, this order includes the families Fabaceae or legumes (including the subfamilies Caesalpinioideae, Mimosoideae, and Faboideae), Quillajaceae, Polygalaceae or milkworts (including the families Diclidantheraceae, Moutabeaceae, and Xanthophyllaceae), and Surianaceae. Under the Cronquist system and some other plant classification systems, the order Fabales contains only the family Fabaceae. In the classification system of Dahlgren the Fabales were in the superorder Fabiflorae (also called Fabanae) with three families corresponding to the subfamilies of Fabaceae in APG II. The other families treated in the Fabales by the APG II classification were placed in separate orders by Cronquist, the Polygalaceae within its own order, the Polygalales, and the Quillajaceae and Surianaceae within the Rosales.

The Fabaceae, as the third-largest plant family in the world, contain most of the diversity of the Fabales, the other families making up a comparatively small portion of the order's diversity. Research in the order is largely focused on the Fabaceae, due in part to its great biological diversity, and to its importance as food plants. The Polygalaceae are fairly well researched among plant families, in part due to the large diversity of the genus Polygala, and other members of the family being food plants for various Lepidoptera (butterfly and moth) species. While taxonomists using molecular phylogenetic techniques find strong support for the order, questions remain about the morphological relationships of the Quillajaceae and Surianaceae to the rest of the order, due in part to limited research on these families.

According to molecular clock calculations, the lineage that led to Fabales split from other plants about 101 million years ago.

== Distribution ==
The Fabales are a cosmopolitan order of plants, except only the subfamily Papilionoideae (Faboideae) of the Fabaceae are well dispersed throughout the northern part of the North Temperate Zone.

== Phylogeny ==
The phylogeny of the Fabales is shown below.

- - Rosales (outgroup)
  - Fabales
    - Polygalaceae
    - Surianaceae
    - - Quillajaceae
      - Fabaceae

== Gallery ==
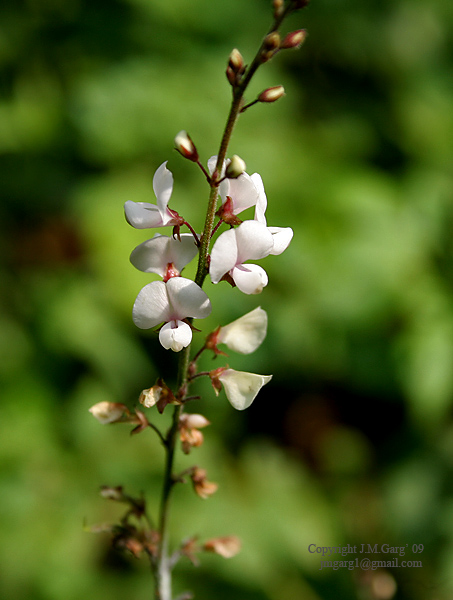
Pleurolobus gangeticus

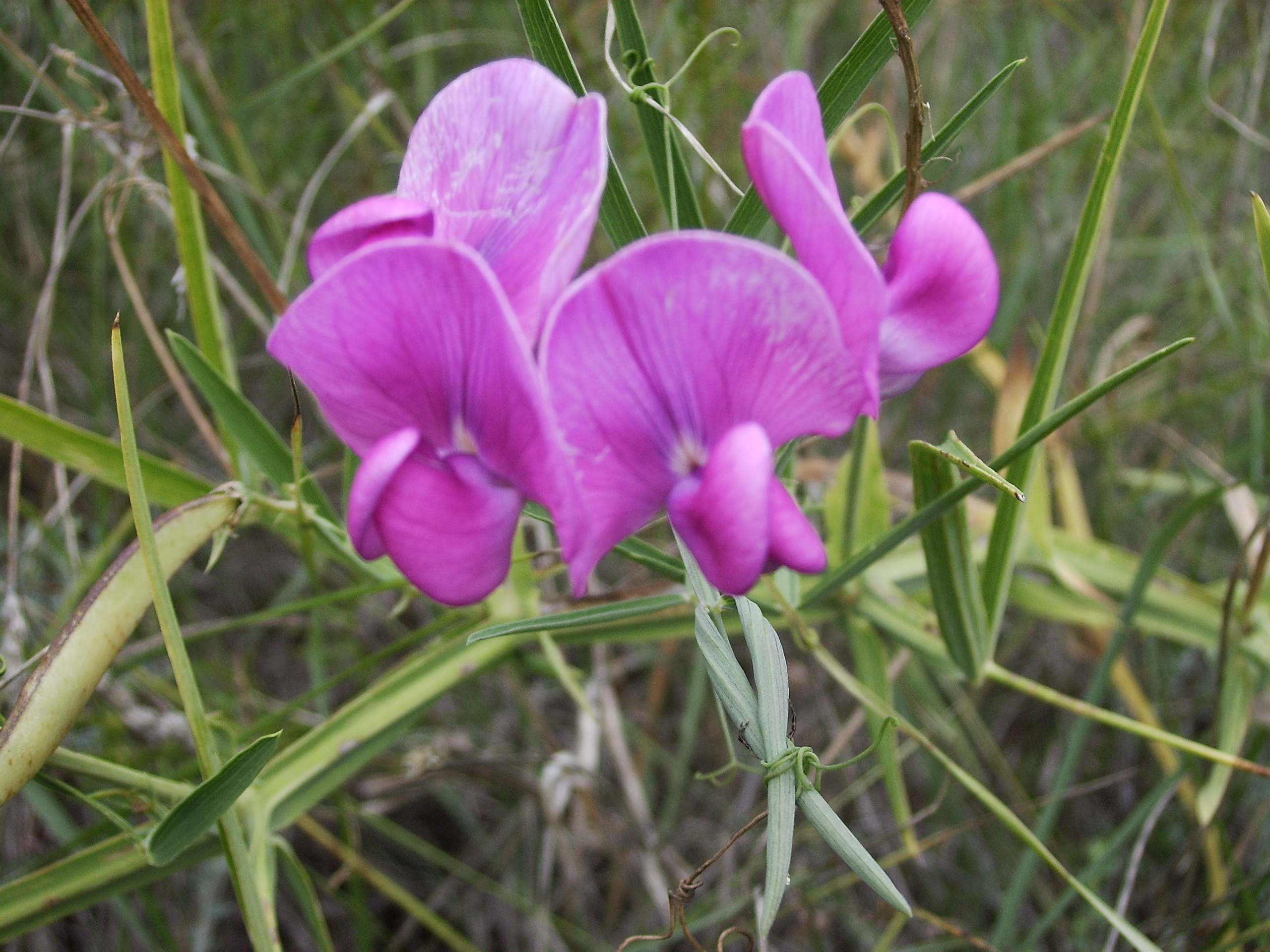
Tuberous pea (Lathyrus tuberosus) of the Fabaceae

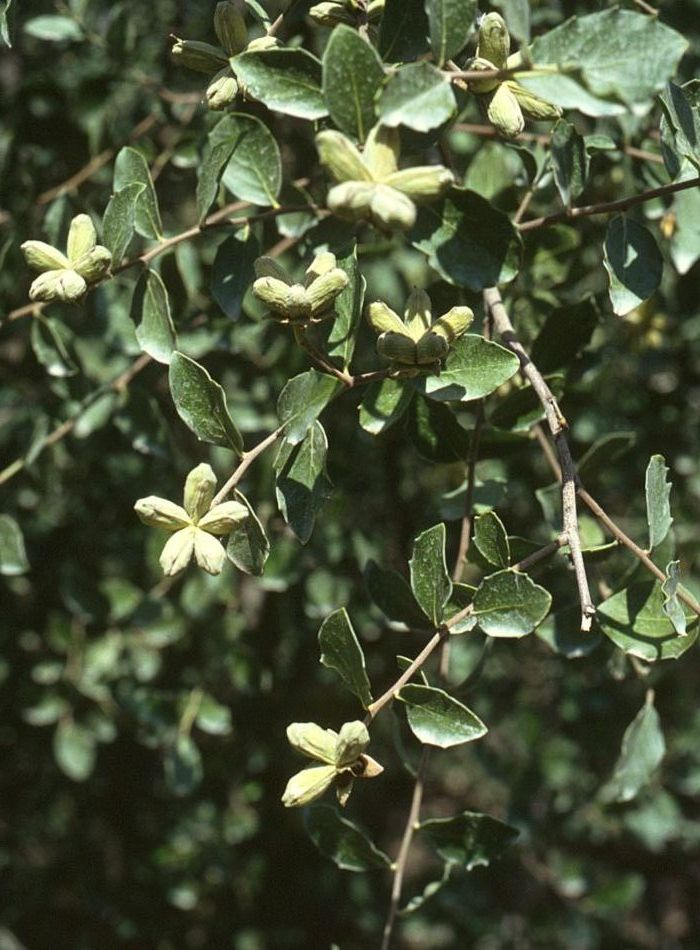
Soap bark tree (Quillaja saponaria) of the Quillajaceae

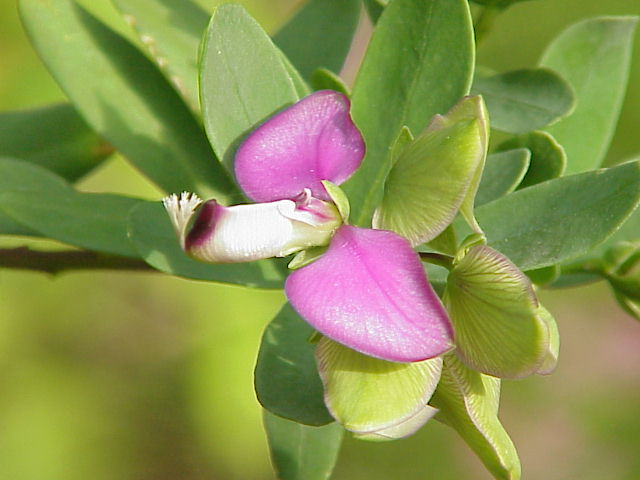
Milkwort (Polygala myrtifolia) of the Polygalaceae

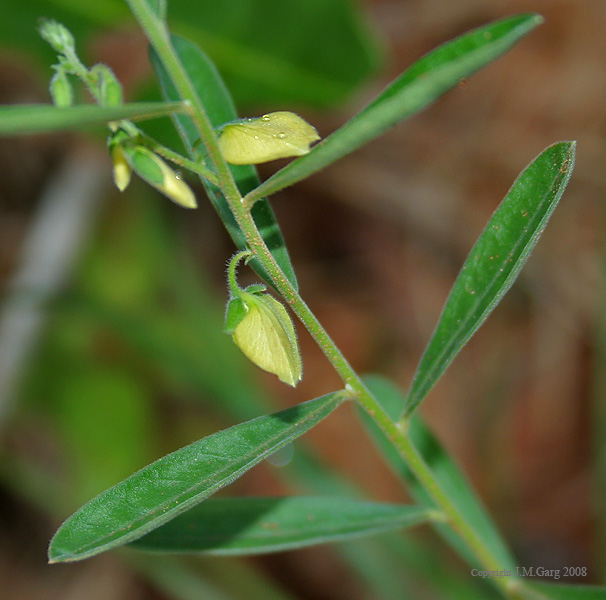
Milkwort (Polygala elongata) of the Polygalaceae

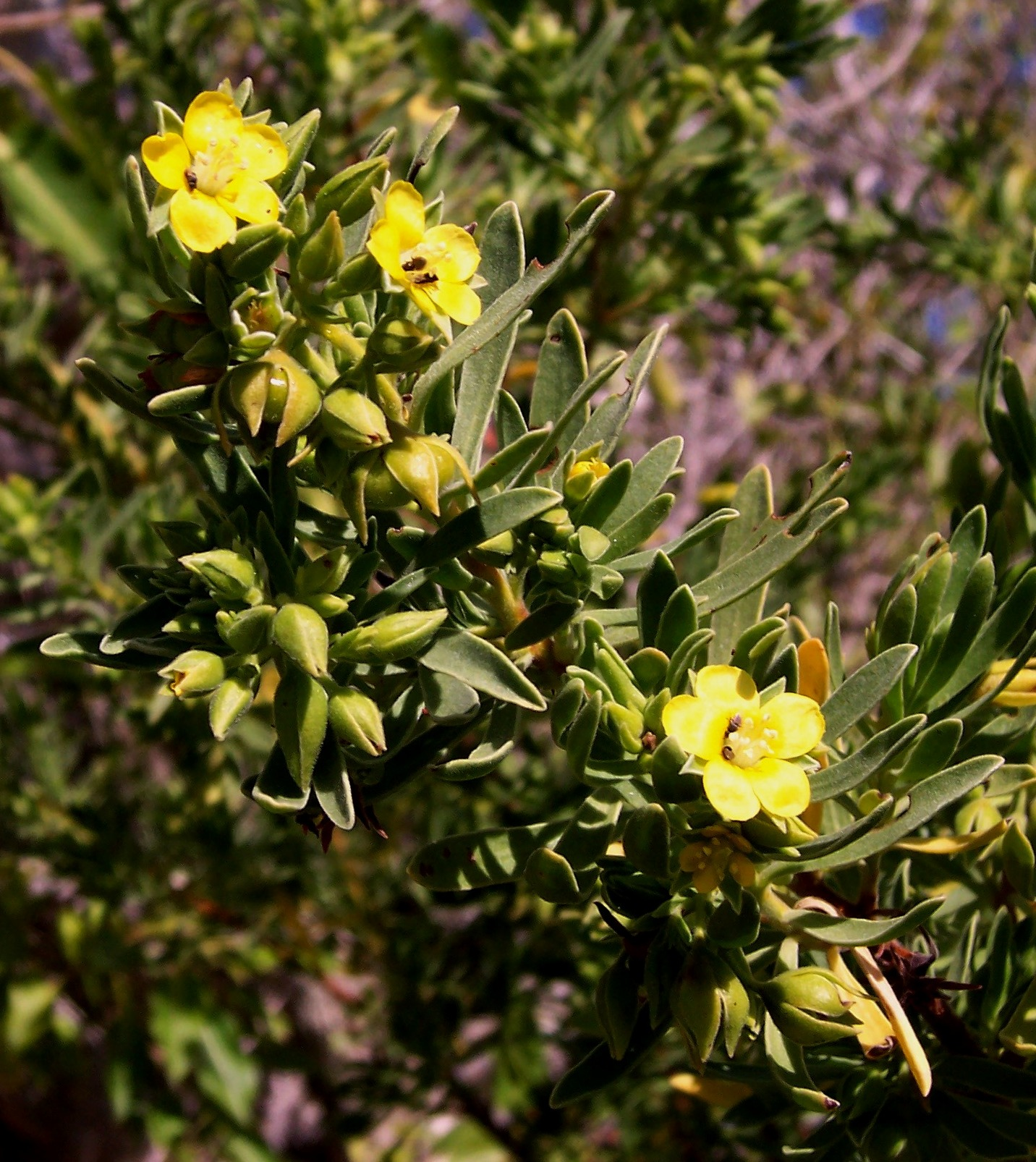
Bay cedar (Suriana maritima) of the Surianaceae
