= List of St Paul's College, University of Sydney alumni =

This is a list of notable Old Paulines, alumni of St Paul's College, University of Sydney.

== Rhodes scholars ==
- 1907 Garnet Portus
- 1908 Richard Waddy
- 1911 Hugh Ward
- 1915 Walter Crawford
- 1920 Vernon Treatt
- 1925 Allan Callaghan
- 1931 David Garnsey
- 1935 Keith Bradfield
- 1939 Walter Hughes
- 1940 Basil Travers
- 1946 William Woodward
- 1948 Louis Davies
- 1951 Adrian Henchman
- 1953 James McLeod
- 1956 John Bailey
- 1960 Malcolm Swinburn
- 1961 David Garnsey
- 1964 J. Dyson Heydon
- 1975 Peter King
- 1990 Andrew Bell
- 1992 Scott Nixon
- 1995 Peter Barnett
- 2001 Andrew Charlton
- 2003 Benjamin Juratowitch
- 2007 Eric Knight
- 2009 Nikolas Kirby
- 2010 David Llewellyn
- 2011 Nathaniel Ware
- 2013 Patrick Bateman

== Arts and humanities ==
- Michael Blakemore, actor, writer and theatre director
- Russell Braddon, writer and broadcaster
- Terence Clarke AM, composer and theatre director
- Peter Cousens, actor and singer
- Thomas Dunbabin, classicist and archaeologist
- Laurie Fitzhardinge, historian and librarian
- Tim Freedman, lead singer of The Whitlams
- John Gaden AM, actor
- Peter Garnsey, classicist and academic
- H. M. Green, literary historian
- James Halliday, wine writer and critic
- Tony Jones, journalist and television presenter
- Gavin Long, journalist and military historian
- David Marr, biographer and writer
- Jock Marshall, writer
- Jonathan Mills, composer and festival director
- David Musgrave, poet
- T. Inglis Moore, writer, anthologist and academic
- Peter Moyes, educator
- Morgan O'Neill, film director, actor, and singer
- Dowell O'Reilly, poet, short story writer and politician
- Hamish Rosser, musician
- Michael Rubbo, documentary filmmaker
- Garnet Portus, academic
- Martin Sharp, artist, cartoonist, songwriter and film-maker
- Sebastian Smee, art critic
- Adam Spencer, comedian, media personality and former radio presenter
- Chris Taylor, comedian

== Business ==
- Aslam Azhar, television executive
- Warwick Oswald Fairfax, businessman and member of the Fairfax family of media proprietors

== Politics and law ==
- John Anderson (b. 1956), former Australian Deputy Prime Minister
- Julian Beale (1934–2021), billionaire and former Member for Deakin
- Andrew Bell, President of the New South Wales Court of Appeal
- John Booth, former Member for Wakehurst
- Sir Nigel Bowen (1911–94), former Federal Court judge, Australian Foreign Minister
- Donald Alastair Cameron, Minister for Health and Member for Oxley
- Andrew Charlton, economist and Member for Parramatta
- Terence Cole AO RFD QC, former Judge of the Supreme Court of New South Wales
- Percy Colquhoun, parliamentarian, lawyer and sportsman
- Nicholas Cowdery AO QC, former Director of Public Prosecutions for NSW
- Ernest Docker, judge and cricketer
- Clive Evatt QC, NSW Member of Parliament
- Andrew Gee, Member for Calare
- Jack Grahame, lawyer
- Roland Green, Member for Richmond
- Dyson Heydon AC, QC (b 1943), High Court judge
- Peter King, former Member for Wentworth
- Mark Leeming, Judge of the Court of Appeal of the Supreme Court of New South Wales
- Sandy Macdonald, Former Senator for NSW
- Kim Mackay, British politician
- Alan Mansfield KCMG KCVO, 18th Governor of Queensland and barrister
- Sir William McMahon CH (1908–88), former Australian Prime Minister
- Leslie Melville, economist, academic and public servant
- John Peden KCMG KC, President of the NSW Legislative Council
- Peter Phelps, Member of the New South Wales Legislative Council
- Albert PiddingtonKC (1862–1945), former High Court judge and Royal Commissioner
- Robert Pring, judge of the Supreme Court of New South Wales
- Andrew Refshauge (b. 1949), former New South Wales Deputy Premier
- Thomas Roseby (1867–1929), former Chief Judge of Mauritius
- James Rowland, Governor of New South Wales and senior Royal Australian Air Force officer
- John Rowland, diplomat and poet
- Ben Saul, international barrister
- Edward St John, Member for Warringah and barrister
- Sir Kenneth Street (1890–1972), former NSW Chief Justice
- Sir Philip Street (1863–1938), former NSW Chief Justice
- George Thorn, Member of the Queensland Legislative Assembly and Premier of Queensland
- Robert Tickner (b. 1951), former Australian Minister for Aboriginal and Torres Strait Islander Affairs
- Sir Vernon Treatt KBE, MM, QC (1897–1984), Minister for Justice (1938–1941), Leader of the Opposition (1946–1952), and Member for Woollahra
- Bret Walker AO, SC (b. 1954), Australian barrister
- Gough Whitlam AC (1916–2014), former Australian Prime Minister
- Sir Dudley Williams (1889–1962), former High Court judge
- William Windeyer (b. 1936), NSW Supreme Court judge
- David Yates, Judge of the Federal Court of Australia

== Religion ==
- Fortescue Ash, 4th Bishop of Rockhampton
- Ernest Burgmann (1885–1967), church leader
- George Cranswick, 2nd Bishop of Gippsland
- David Garnsey, Bishop of Gippsland
- Max Thomas, bishop
- Henry Alexander Woodd, Anglican minister

== Science and medicine ==
- Peter Orlebar Bishop, neurophysiologist
- Sir Denis Browne (1892–1967), surgeon
- Ian Constable, ophthalmologist
- Lorimer Dods LVO, paediatrician
- Sir Lorimer Dods KB LVO (1900–1981), paediatrician
- William Sutherland Dun, palaeontologist
- A. P. Elkin CMG (1891–1979), anthropologist
- Charles Huxtable, doctor
- Bruce Kapferer, anthropologist
- Arthur Rex Knight, psychologist
- Colin Laverty, medical practitioner and founder of Laverty Pathology
- Patrick McGorry AO (b.1952), psychiatrist, academic, 2010 Australian of the Year
- Edward Pierson Ramsay, zoologist
- Douglas Reye, pathologist

== Sports ==
- Al Baxter (b. 1977), rugby union player with Australian national team
- Mark Bethwaite AM, Olympic sailor
- Ed Cowan, Australian Test cricketer
- Walter Crawford, first-class cricketer, Governor of Northern Sudan
- Tim Davidson, rugby union player
- Frank Futter, rugby union player
- Cameron Girdlestone, 2016 Olympic silver medallist for rowing
- Daniel Halangahu, rugby union coach
- Michael Hawker, Australian National Rugby Union player and captain
- Mitch Inman, rugby union player
- Jack Massie, cricketer
- Jim Phipps, Australian rules footballer
- Brian Power, Olympic judoka
- Lachlan Renshaw (b. 1987), Olympic and Commonwealth Games track athlete
- Claude Tozer, cricketer and medical doctor
- Basil Travers, rugby player and educator
- Mick Waddy, cricketer and clergyman
- Robert Waley, Olympic coxswain
