= Mpox vaccine =

Vaccine for mpox

Vaccine description
- Target: Mpox
- Vaccine type: MVA-BN: attenuated, non-replicating LC16m8: attenuated, minimally replicating ACAM2000: live, replication-competent OrthopoxVac: genetically attenuated

Clinical data
- Trade names: ACAM2000, others
- AHFS/Drugs.com: Multum Consumer Information
- MedlinePlus: a622052
- License data: US DailyMed: Mpox
- Routes of administration: MVA-BN: subcutaneous, intradermal LC16m8, ACAM2000: percutaneous
- ATC code: J07BX01 (WHO)

Legal status
- Legal status: CA: ℞-only; US: ℞-only (Jynneos, ACAM2000); EU: Rx-only; Rx-only

Identifiers
- UNII: 4SV59689SK; TU8J357395
- KEGG: D05295; D06510

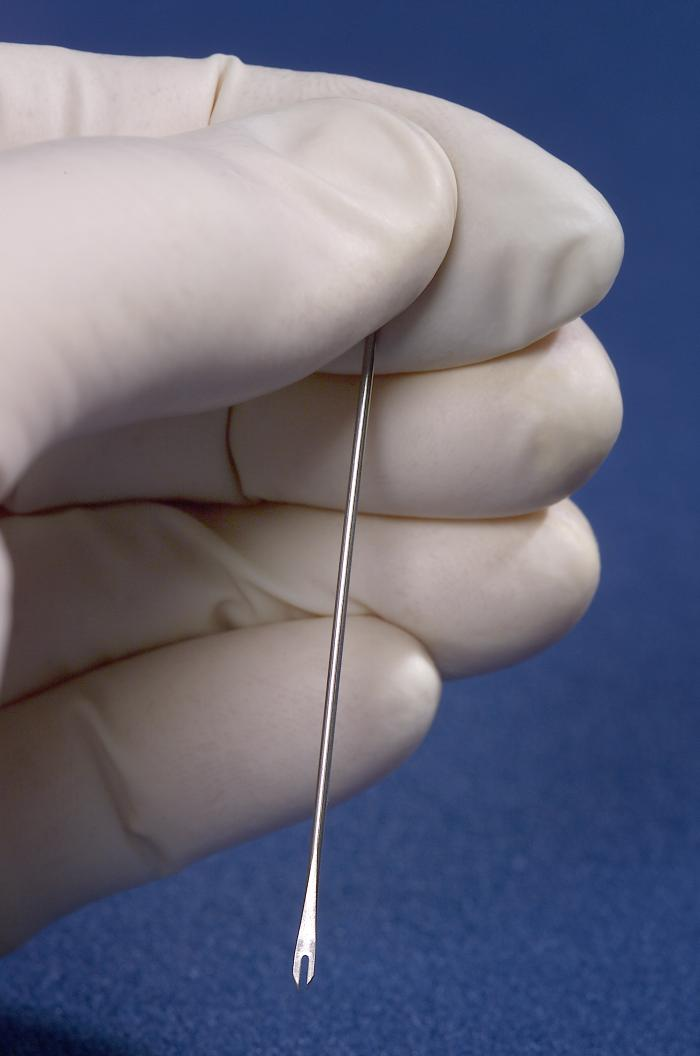
The smallpox vaccine needle is used to administer the ACAM2000 mpox vaccine

An mpox vaccine, also known as a monkeypox vaccine, is designed to induce immunity against orthopoxviruses to prevent mpox, an infectious disease caused by monkeypox virus (MPXV). Vaccines used against mpox are based on vaccinia virus, a related orthopoxvirus historically used for vaccination against smallpox. The close antigenic relationship among orthopoxviruses allows immunity induced by vaccinia virus to provide cross-protection against monkeypox virus.

Several vaccines originally developed for smallpox have been licensed or recommended for prevention of mpox. The World Health Organization (WHO) recommends MVA-BN, a non-replicating vaccine, and LC16m8, a minimally replicating vaccine, for those at risk during outbreaks. The replication-competent ACAM2000 vaccine may also be used following an individual risk–benefit assessment if preferred vaccines are unavailable. OrthopoxVac, a fourth-generation vaccine, has been registered in Russia for prevention of smallpox and related orthopoxvirus infections. Mpox vaccine is included on the World Health Organization's List of Essential Medicines.

== History ==
Mpox was first identified as a distinct illness in 1958 among laboratory monkeys in Copenhagen, Denmark. The first documented human cases occurred in 1970, involving six unvaccinated children during the smallpox eradication efforts, with the first being a 9-month-old boy in the Democratic Republic of the Congo. Because monkeypox virus and variola virus, the cause of smallpox, are closely related orthopoxviruses, immunity produced by smallpox vaccination was found to provide protection against mpox. An analysis of cases recorded in Zaire between 1980 and 1984 found that people with evidence of previous smallpox vaccination had approximately 85% protection against mpox. Human cases became increasingly common following the end of routine smallpox vaccination, with the decline in vaccine-derived orthopoxvirus immunity identified as a likely contributing factor.

The 2003 Midwest mpox outbreak, the first recognized human mpox outbreak outside Africa, led to the first substantial use of smallpox vaccination for mpox prevention in the United States. The Centers for Disease Control and Prevention (CDC) recommended vaccination for people investigating the outbreak or caring for infected people or animals, as well as people who had close or intimate contact with confirmed cases. Post-exposure vaccination could be given up to 14 days after exposure. Because smallpox vaccine had not been licensed in the United States specifically for prevention of mpox, use of the vaccine in response to the outbreak was made available under an investigational new drug protocol sponsored by the CDC.

In September 2019, the US Food and Drug Administration (FDA) approved MVA-BN, marketed in the United States as Jynneos, for prevention of both smallpox and mpox in adults considered at high risk of infection. This was the first vaccine approved in the United States specifically for prevention of mpox.

MVA-BN was used on a large scale during the 2022–2023 mpox outbreak. Initial vaccine shortages in the United States led to prioritization of people with known exposures, followed by expansion to people at increased risk of exposure. In August 2022, the FDA authorized administration of smaller doses of Jynneos by intradermal injection in adults as a dose-sparing measure. Approximately 1.2 million doses were administered in the United States between May 2022 and May 2023.

A resurgence of mpox in Africa in 2024 accelerated international regulatory action and vaccine distribution. The FDA expanded the indication for ACAM2000 to include prevention of mpox in August 2024. The WHO prequalified MVA-BN on 13 September 2024, making it the first mpox vaccine to receive WHO prequalification, and granted LC16m8 an Emergency Use Listing on 19 November 2024, facilitating broader international procurement during the outbreak.

== Vaccines ==
Vaccines used against mpox differ principally in the extent to which their vaccinia virus strains can replicate in humans. As of August 2024, there were four vaccines in use to prevent mpox, all originally developed against smallpox. Vaccinia is less virulent than either monkeypox virus or variola virus, and the high level of protein identity among orthopoxviruses contributes to the cross-protection produced by vaccinia-based vaccines.

Vaccine	Manufacturer and market name	Type	Typical schedule	Status and characteristics
MVA-BN	Manufactured by Bavarian Nordic, marketed as Jynneos, Imvanex, Imvamune	Third-generation, live attenuated, non-replicating modified vaccinia Ankara	Two doses, normally 28 days apart	WHO-recommended and WHO-prequalified; licensed for use against mpox in Europe, the United States and Canada
LC16m8	Manufactured by KM Biologics, marketed as LC16-KMB	Third-generation, live attenuated, minimally replicating vaccinia	One dose by multiple-puncture technique	WHO-recommended; WHO Emergency Use Listed; licensed for mpox in Japan
ACAM2000	Manufactured by Emergent BioSolutions, marketed as ACAM2000	Second-generation, live replication-competent vaccinia	One dose by multiple punctures with a bifurcated needle	Licensed for mpox in the United States; WHO recommends its use when preferred vaccines are unavailable following an individual risk–benefit assessment
OrthopoxVac	Manufactured by the State Research Center of Virology and Biotechnology (VECTOR) in Russia, and marketed as OrthopoxVac	Fourth-generation, genetically attenuated vaccinia	A single-dose regimen has been studied	Registered in Russia for smallpox and related orthopoxvirus infections

MVA-BN contains a vaccinia strain that cannot productively replicate in human cells. It therefore does not produce the characteristic vaccination-site lesion or "take" associated with replication-competent smallpox vaccines and has a more favorable safety profile for people in whom replicating vaccines may be contraindicated. MVA-BN is preferred over ACAM2000 in the United States for people considered at high risk of exposure to mpox or who may recently have been exposed, in part because of its more favorable safety profile. LC16m8 can replicate to a limited extent and produces a localized vaccination take. It is administered with a bifurcated needle using a multiple-puncture technique. Japan extended the indication for LC16m8 to mpox in August 2022.

ACAM2000 contains replication-competent vaccinia virus. The virus replicates at the vaccination site and can be transferred from the resulting lesion to other parts of the body or to close contacts until the site has healed. OrthopoxVac was developed by the State Research Center of Virology and Biotechnology VECTOR from a vaccinia strain genetically modified through deletion of genes associated with viral virulence and immune evasion.

In the United States, the Centers for Disease Control and Prevention recommends vaccination for people with known or suspected exposure to mpox and recommends the two-dose Jynneos series for adults with specified sexual risk factors and for certain people at occupational risk of exposure to orthopoxviruses. Routine vaccination is not recommended for the general public or for healthcare personnel solely because they care for people with mpox. In the European Union, Imvanex is authorized for the prevention of mpox; people not previously vaccinated against smallpox, mpox or disease caused by vaccinia virus receive two doses at least 28 days apart.
