= Huxtable =

Huxtable is a surname. Notable people with the surname include:

== People ==
- Henry Huxtable, a Bishop of Mauritius
- Ada Louise Huxtable, nee Landman (1921–2013) American architecture critic
- Charles Huxtable (1891–1980) Australian doctor
- Charles Huxtable (British Army officer) (1931–2018), senior British Army officer
- Dave Huxtable, American football coach
- Dick Huxtable Welsh international rugby player
- Eric Huxtable, Australian footballer
- Judy Huxtable, British actress
- Juliana Huxtable, American artist
- Rebecca Huxtable, British radio personality
- Richard Huxtable, British medical ethicist
- Rosemary Huxtable, Australian civil servant
- Russ Huxtable, American politician from Delaware

== Fictional characters ==
- The Huxtable family of The Cosby Show; see List of The Cosby Show characters#Main characters
- Millicent Huxtable, a character in One Tree Hill; see List of One Tree Hill characters#Main characters
