= Jim Phipps =

Jim Phipps may refer to:

- Jim Phipps (footballer) (1884–1977), Australian rules footballer for Essendon
- Jim Phipps (rugby union) (1931–2021), Australian rugby union international

== See also ==
- James Phipps
