= Myopericarditis =

- Specialty: Cardiology

Myopericarditis is a combination of both myocarditis and pericarditis appearing in a single individual, namely inflammation of both the pericardium and the heart muscle. It can involve the presence of fluid in the heart.

== Risk factors ==
The appearance of myopericarditis is associated with infections such as acute tonsillitis, pneumonia, and gastroenteritis.

Smallpox vaccination has been a known risk factor for myocarditis and pericarditis since the 1950s. In 1983, an incidence of myocarditis of 1 per 10 000 was reported among Finnish military personnel. Among US military service members vaccinated between December 2002 and March 2003 with Dryvax smallpox vaccine 18 cases of probable myopericarditis were reported, which was an incidence of 7.8 per 100 000 over 30 days.

A meta-review from 2022 shows that the overall risk for myopericarditis after receiving a COVID-19 vaccine is low. In addition, the incidence of myopericarditis is significantly higher with a smallpox vaccination in comparison with a COVID-19 vaccination.

The ACAM2000 smallpox vaccine has been known to cause myopericarditis in some people.

== Etymology ==
When ventricular function is normal, the term myopericarditis is used. Cases with impaired function are labeled perimyocarditis, though the two terms are often used interchangeably. Both will be reflected on an ECG.

In a different naming scheme, inflammation that is predominantly pericarditis with some myocardial involvement is called myopericarditis, while predominant myocarditis with some pericardial involvement is called perimyocarditis.
