= Ben Rubin =

Ben Rubin or Benjamin Rubin may refer to:

- Ben Rubin (legislator) (1886–1942), Wisconsin Socialist and Progressive state legislator from Milwaukee
- Ben Rubin (Magic: The Gathering player), American Magic: The Gathering player
- Ben Rubin (entrepreneur), co-founder of Meerkat
- Benjamin Rubin (1917–2010), microbiologist and inventor of the bifurcated vaccination needle for smallpox
- Ben Rubin (artist) (born 1964), media artist and designer based in New York City
