= 2003 United States smallpox vaccination campaign =

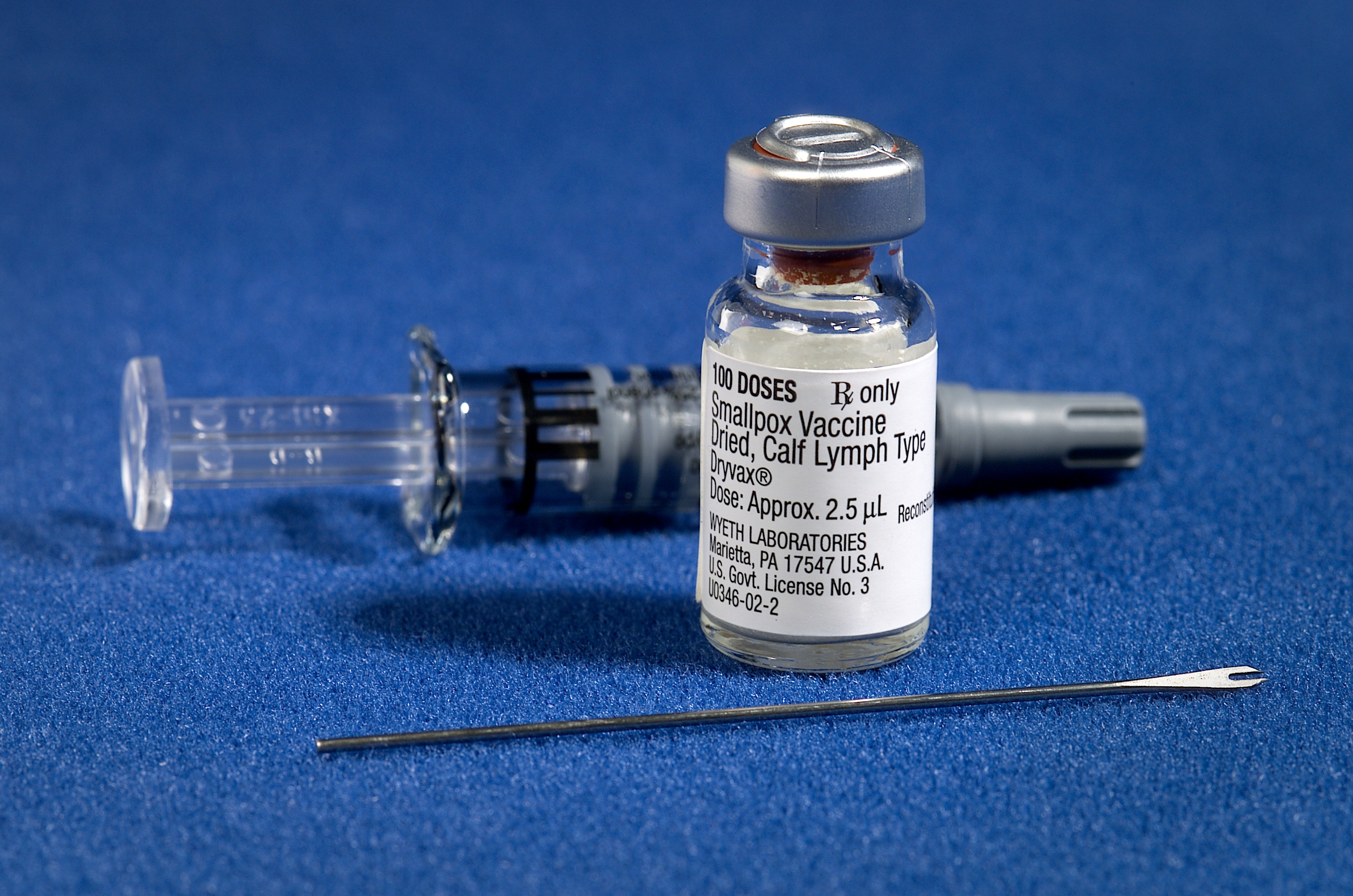
Smallpox vaccine

The 2003 United States smallpox vaccination campaign was a vaccination program announced by the White House on 13 December 2002 as preparedness for bioterrorism using smallpox virus. The campaign aimed to provide the smallpox vaccine to those who would respond to an attack, establishing Smallpox Response Teams and using DryVax (containing the NYCBOH strain) to mandatorily vaccinate half a million American military personnel, followed by half a million health care worker volunteers by January 2004. The first vaccine was administered to then-President George W. Bush.

The campaign ended early in June 2003, with only 38,257 civilian health care workers vaccinated, after several hospitals refused to participate due to the risk of the live virus infecting vulnerable patients and skepticism about the risks of an attack, and after over 50 heart complications were reported by the CDC. That August, the US Institute of Medicine (IOM) criticized the programme for its costs and not considering other bioterrorism control measures such as surveillance. The adverse cardiac events, including two deaths, were however unlikely to have been caused by the vaccine. A 2005 IOM report noted that some of the problems of the campaign stemmed from administration officials overruling scientific advice on the numbers who should be vaccinated and a lack of communication by the CDC of the public health need, though it found that the campaign had increased general preparedness for sudden occurrences of infectious diseases like that year's monkeypox outbreak and the 2002–2004 SARS outbreak.
