= James Phipps =

English child given cowpox vaccine

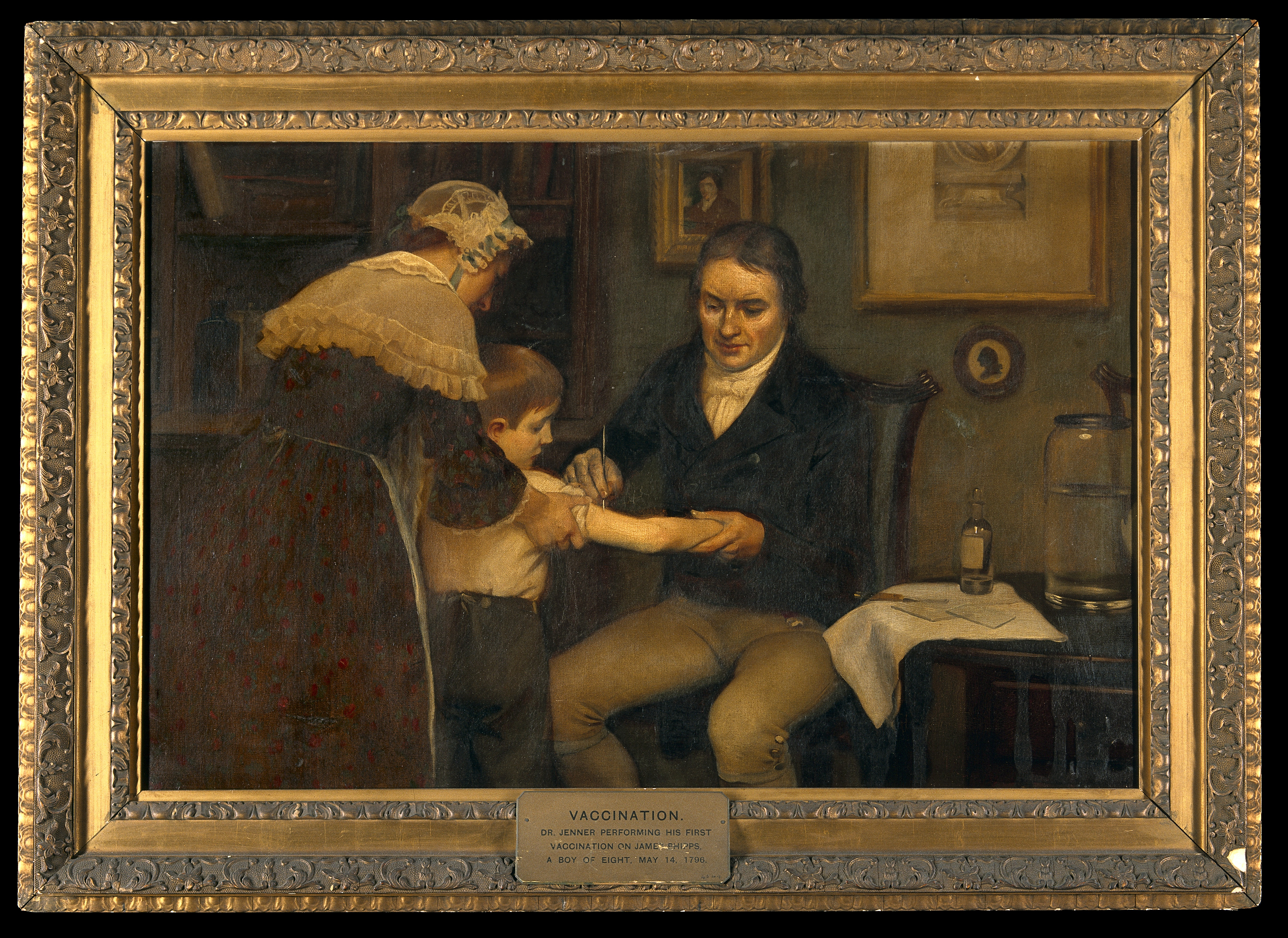
Dr Jenner performing his first vaccination on James Phipps, a boy of age 8, on 14 May 1796. Painting by Ernest Board (early 20th century).

James Phipps (1788 – 1853) was the first person given the experimental cowpox vaccine by Edward Jenner. Jenner knew of a local belief that dairy workers who had contracted a relatively mild infection called cowpox were immune to smallpox, and successfully tested his theory on the 8-years-old James Phipps on 17 May 1796.

== Early life and vaccination against smallpox ==
Phipps was born in Berkeley parish in Gloucestershire to a poor landless labourer working as Jenner's gardener. He was baptised in St Mary's parish church, Berkeley, when he was 4.

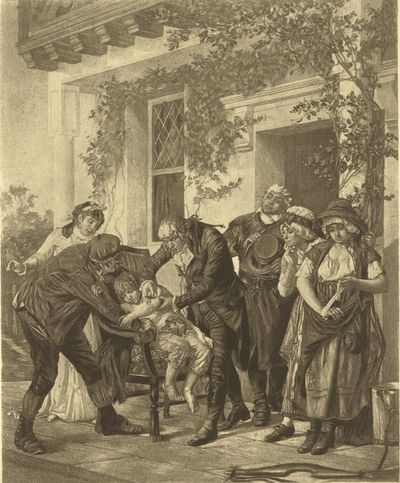
The inoculation of James Phipps by Edward Jenner. Lithograph by Gaston Mélingue (circa 1894).

On 14 May 1796 he was selected by Jenner, who took "a healthy boy, about eight years old for the purpose of inoculation for the Cow Pox". Jenner took some fluid from the cowpox vesicles on the hand of a milkmaid named Sarah Nelmes (in an unpublished manuscript Jenner refers to her as Lucy Nelmes), and inoculated Phipps by two small cuts in the skin of the boy's arm.

Jenner wrote: On the seventh day he complained of uneasiness in the axilla and on the ninth he became a little chilly, lost his appetite, and had a slight headache. During the whole of this day he was perceptibly indisposed, and spent the night with some degree of restlessness, but on the day following he was perfectly well. About six weeks later Jenner inoculated the boy with smallpox which had no effect, and concluded that he now had complete protection against smallpox. Phipps was subsequently inoculated with smallpox more than twenty times without succumbing to the disease.

Phipps is often cited incorrectly as the first person to be vaccinated against smallpox by inoculation with cowpox: other people had undergone the procedure before him. In 1791, Peter Plett from Kiel in the Duchy of Holstein (now Germany) inoculated three children, and Benjamin Jesty of Yetminster in Dorset performed the procedure on three family members in 1774. However, Jenner included his description of the vaccination of Phipps and an illustration of the hand of Sarah Nelmes from which the material was taken in his Inquiry published in 1798. Together with a series of vaccinations which showed that the vaccine could be maintained by arm-to-arm transfer, and information about selection of suitable material, Jenner's Inquiry was the first published account of vaccination.

== Later life ==
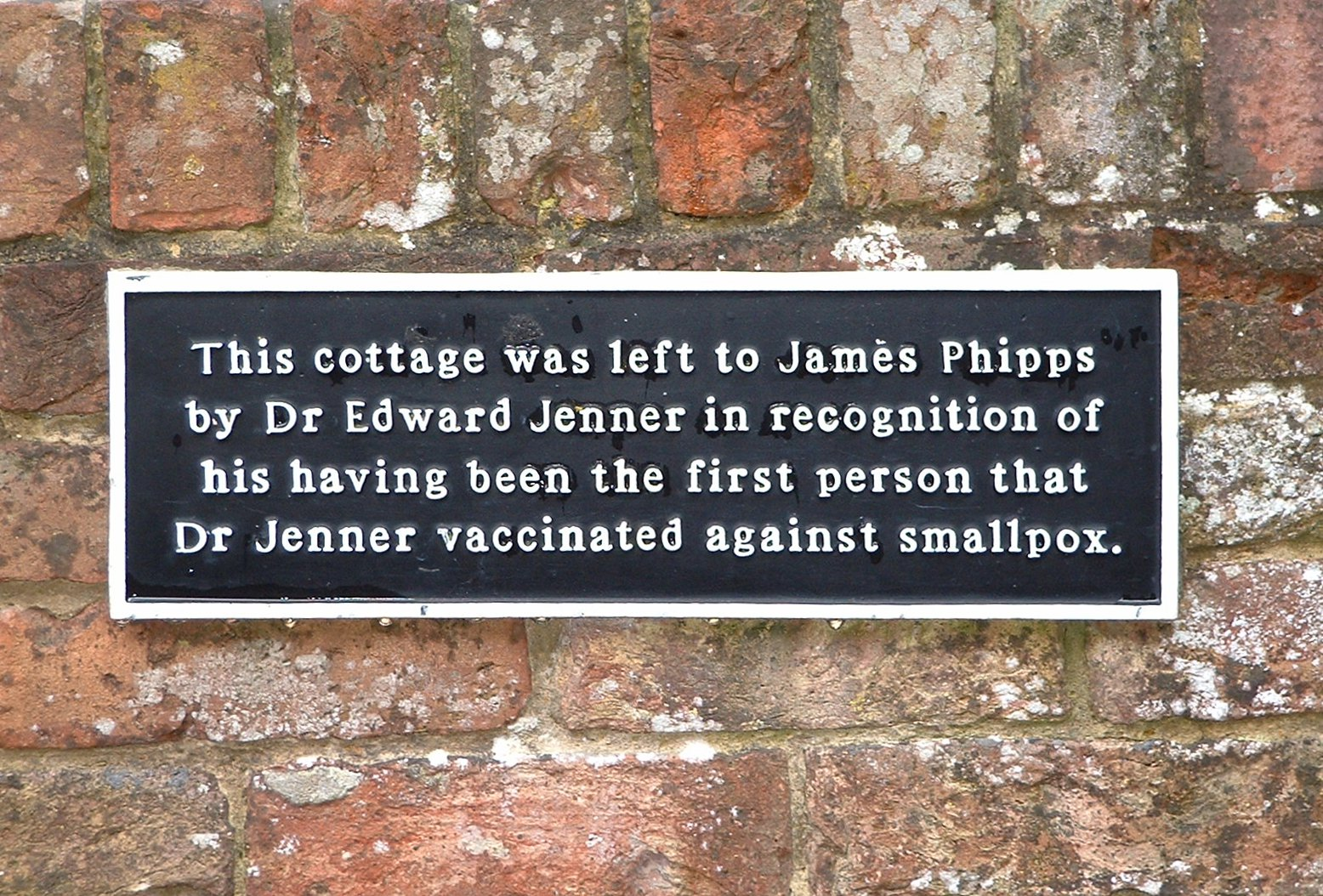
Plaque at James Phipps' cottage in Berkeley, Gloucestershire

Later in Phipps's life, Jenner gave him, his wife, and his two children a free lease on a cottage in Berkeley, which went on to house the Edward Jenner Museum between 1968 and 1982. Phipps attended Jenner's funeral on 3 February 1823.

In 1853 Phipps was buried in St Mary's Church, Berkeley, where he had been baptised. Jenner was also buried in this church.
