= Peter Plett =

Peter Plett (29 December 1766 – 29 March 1823) was a teacher and pioneer of smallpox vaccine from the Duchy of Schleswig. His work with smallpox vaccine, undertaken in the early 1790s before the definitive studies by Edward Jenner, was not acknowledged until many years later.

== Life ==
Plett was born on 29 December 1766 in Klein Rheide, Duchy of Schleswig. In 1790, Plett was employed as a home tutor in Schönweide where he learnt from milkmaids about cowpox preventing humans from being infected with smallpox. In 1791, he moved to the Meierhof at Hasselburg in Gut Wittenberg/East-Holstein where he vaccinated its owner Martini's three children with cowpox lymph which protected them against smallpox. Plett was one of at least six people in England, Denmark and Germany (Bose in 1769, Sevel, Jensen and Jesty in 1774, Rendall, Plett in 1791.) tested successfully the possibility of using the cowpox vaccine as an immunization for smallpox in humans. Only five years later, Edward Jenner experiments established the link between cowpox infection and smallpox immunity, which made him world-famous.

In 1790 and again in 1791/92, Plett reported his success to the medical faculty of the University of Kiel, but they favoured the older method of variolation so they did not act on the reports. In 1802 after Jenner's method had reached the area, Plett was interviewed by Friedrich Adolf von Heinze on behalf of Christoph Heinrich Pfaff from the Medical Faculty of the University of Kiel. His report was published by Pfaff and Heinze and later forwarded to the German Office of the government in Copenhagen.

From 1793 on, Plett attended the teachers' seminar headed by Heinrich Müller in Kiel. He was encouraged by his principal pastor Johann Georg Schmidt who considered him "one of Müller's most promising seminar attendees" and engaged him as a teacher in Laboe in 1796 in Stakendorf in 1808.

Franz Hermann Hegewisch, who became a professor of the University of Kiel in 1809, discovered Plett's reports about his success with cowpox vaccination and the university's ignorance. He recommended publishing an article about Plett's discoveries to the editor of the Neue Schleswig-Holsteinische Provinzialberichte (New provincial reports of Schleswig-Holstein), Georg Peter Petersen. In 1815, Petersen published the previous year's interview with Plett, so he confirmed Heinze's report of 1802.

In 1820, Plett was forced to retire from teaching due to his alcoholism. Pastor Schmidt and his superior, provost Cay Wilhelm von Ahlefeldt, negotiated a modest pension and accommodation with the citizens of Stakendorf. Three years later, Plett died at the age of 56.

== Honours ==
In 1956, the community of Stakendorf erected a boulder in honour of Peter Plett in front of the school where he formerly worked. Its inscription was corrected in 2006 and augmented by an information board.
