= ACAM2000 =

Smallpox vaccine

Vaccine description
- Target: Smallpox, Mpox
- Vaccine type: Live virus

Clinical data
- Trade names: Acam2000
- AHFS/Drugs.com: Monograph
- License data: US DailyMed: Acam2000
- Pregnancy category: AU: D
- Routes of administration: Percutaneous injection
- ATC code: J07BX01 (WHO)

Legal status
- Legal status: AU: S4 (Prescription only); CA: ℞-only / Schedule D; US: ℞-only

Identifiers
- CAS Number: 860435-78-5
- DrugBank: DB15497
- UNII: 4SV59689SK
- KEGG: D05295

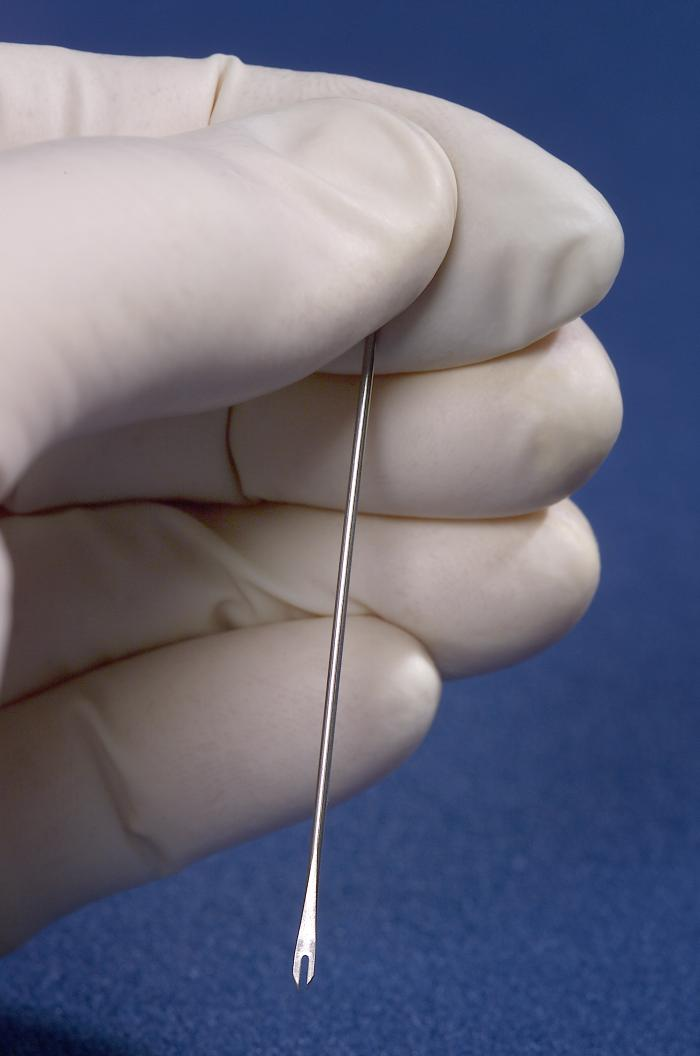
Smallpox vaccine needle

ACAM2000 is a smallpox vaccine manufactured by Emergent Biosolutions. It provides protection against smallpox for people determined to be at high risk for smallpox infection. ACAM2000 is a live replicating vaccinia virus vaccine. Like other smallpox vaccines, it also works as a vaccine for mpox and was approved for this purpose in 2024.

== Medical uses ==
ACAM2000 is indicated for active immunization against smallpox disease for individuals determined to be at high risk for smallpox infection. It is also indicated for the active prevention of mpox disease in individuals determined to be at high risk for mpox infection.

== History ==
ACAM2000 is a vaccine developed by Acambis, which was acquired by Sanofi Pasteur in 2008, before selling the smallpox vaccine to Emergent Biosolutions in 2017. Six strains of vaccinia were isolated from 3,000 doses of Dryvax and found to exhibit significant variation in virulence. The strain with the most similar virulence to the overall Dryvax mixture was selected and grown in MRC-5 cells to make the ACAM1000 vaccine. After a successful Phase I trial of ACAM1000, the virus was passaged three times in Vero cells to develop ACAM2000, which entered mass production at Baxter. The United States ordered over 200 million doses of ACAM2000 in 1999–2001 for its stockpile, and production is ongoing to replace expired vaccine.

Emergent Biosolutions developed ACAM2000 under a contract with the US Centers for Disease Control and Prevention (CDC).

The US Food and Drug Administration (FDA) approved ACAM2000 in August 2007. By February 2008, it replaced Dryvax for all smallpox vaccinations.

As of 2010, there were over 200 million doses manufactured for the US Strategic National Stockpile.

According to the US FDA, "The approval and availability of this second-generation smallpox vaccine in the Strategic National Stockpile (SNS) enhances the emergency preparedness of the United States against the use of smallpox as a dangerous biological weapon."

In August 2024, ACAM2000 was approved for mpox prevention in the United States.

== Administration of ACAM2000 ==
The ACAM2000 vaccine is produced from the vaccinia virus, which is sufficiently closely related to smallpox to provide immunity, but the ACAM2000 vaccine cannot cause smallpox because it does not contain the smallpox virus. Other vaccines containing live viruses include measles, mumps, rubella, polio and chickenpox.

The vaccine is administered using a bifurcated stainless steel needle. The needle is dipped into the vaccine solution and used to prick the skin several times in the upper arm. The vaccinia virus will begin to grow at the injection site. It will cause a localized infection, with a red itchy sore produced at the vaccination site within three to four days. If the infection occurs, that is an indication that the vaccine was successful. Ultimately, the sore turns into a blister and then dries up. A scab forms and then falls off in the third week, leaving a small scar behind.

== Risks ==
Administration of ACAM2000 poses risks and may cause side effects. Most people who have taken the vaccine only report mild reactions. Reactions may include a sore arm, fever, and body aches. Some people may have more serious side effects, including effects that may be life-threatening.

According to the FDA-approved prescribing information leaflet, "Common adverse events include inoculation site signs and symptoms, lymphadenitis, and constitutional symptoms, such as malaise, fatigue, fever, myalgia, and headache." These reactions are less frequent in people being revaccinated than those receiving the vaccine for the first time.

No known contraindications exist to receiving the vaccine in case of an outbreak emergency. Furthermore, it is recommended that the vaccine should be given to pregnant women who have been exposed to smallpox. "Because the risk of maternal serious illness or death, prematurity, miscarriage, or stillbirth from a smallpox infection are greater than the risk of the vaccination, smallpox vaccine is recommended and should be offered to pregnant women in case of an outbreak emergency."
