= Henry Alexander Woodd =

Anglican minister

Henry Alexander Woodd (6 June 1865 – 6 November 1954) was an Australian Anglican priest. Woodd was born in Liverpool, Sydney, New South Wales, and died in Newcastle, New South Wales.
