= Richard Huxtable =

Medical Ethicist (born 1974)

Richard Huxtable (born 1974) is the Director and Professor in Medical Ethics and Law at the Centre for Ethics in Medicine, at the University of Bristol. He is known principally for his work on legal and ethical issues in end-of-life decision-making and euthanasia, surgery and paediatrics and is the author of a number of books on these themes; Law, Ethics and Compromise at the Limits of Life: To Treat or Not to Treat? (2012), Euthanasia, Ethics and the Law: From Conflict to Compromise (2007) and (with Dickenson & Parker) The Cambridge Medical Ethics Workbook (CUP, 2nd edn, 2010). He has also produced numerous chapters, and articles for both academic journals and mainstream newspapers.

Huxtable is best known for his controversial position on the role of "principled compromise" in responding to conflict over the care of a critically ill, incapacitated patient. Huxtable has argued that the law governing both the welfare (or "best interests") of the patient and any wishes they might have conveyed, via an "advance directive" or through the appointment of a "lasting power of attorney", frequently fail to furnish clinicians and families with the guidance they require in these difficult cases. He has proposed that there is a case for "principled compromise" here, and has argued for greater ethical engagement, through a reinvigorated system of clinical ethics support, in which committees work alongside the courts to resolve the conflicts that can arise at the limits of life.

== Education and career ==
Born and educated in South Wales, Richard Huxtable studied Law at the University of Nottingham before completing a PhD on Assisted Dying and English Law at the University of Bristol, where he now teaches. He has held visiting positions at the Ethox Centre in the University of Oxford, the Centre for Biomedical Ethics in the National University of Singapore and the Hastings Center, New York. A long-standing participant in clinical ethics consultation, Huxtable is a member of the UHBT Clinical Ethics Advisory Group and a Trustee of both the UK Clinical Ethics Network and of the National Council for Palliative Care. His research has been funded by organisations including the Wellcome Trust and the European Commission and he has given invited presentations at the Royal Society of Medicine and the Royal College of Surgeons. He has given expert evidence to The Commission on Assisted Dying which was run by the UK think tank Demos.

== Publications ==
=== Books ===
- Euthanasia: All That Matters (2013, London: Hodder).
- Law, Ethics and Compromise at the Limits of Life: To Treat or Not to Treat? (2012, London: Routledge).
- (with D. Dickenson, & M. Parker) The Cambridge Medical Ethics Workbook (2010, 2nd edition, Cambridge: Cambridge University Press).
- Euthanasia, Ethics and the Law: From Conflict to Compromise (2007, London: Routledge-Cavendish).

=== Contributions ===
- (Baxter, M.G. Brennan, Y. Coldicott and M. Möller, with D. Bowman, R. Huxtable, and B. Shannon) The Practical Guide to Medical Ethics and Law: For Junior Doctors and Medical Students (2005, 2nd edition, Cheshire: PasTest Ltd),

=== Other publications ===
"Opinion: The Edge of Life". New Scientist. 15 January 2014.
