= Benjamin Jesty =

British farmer and vaccination pioneer

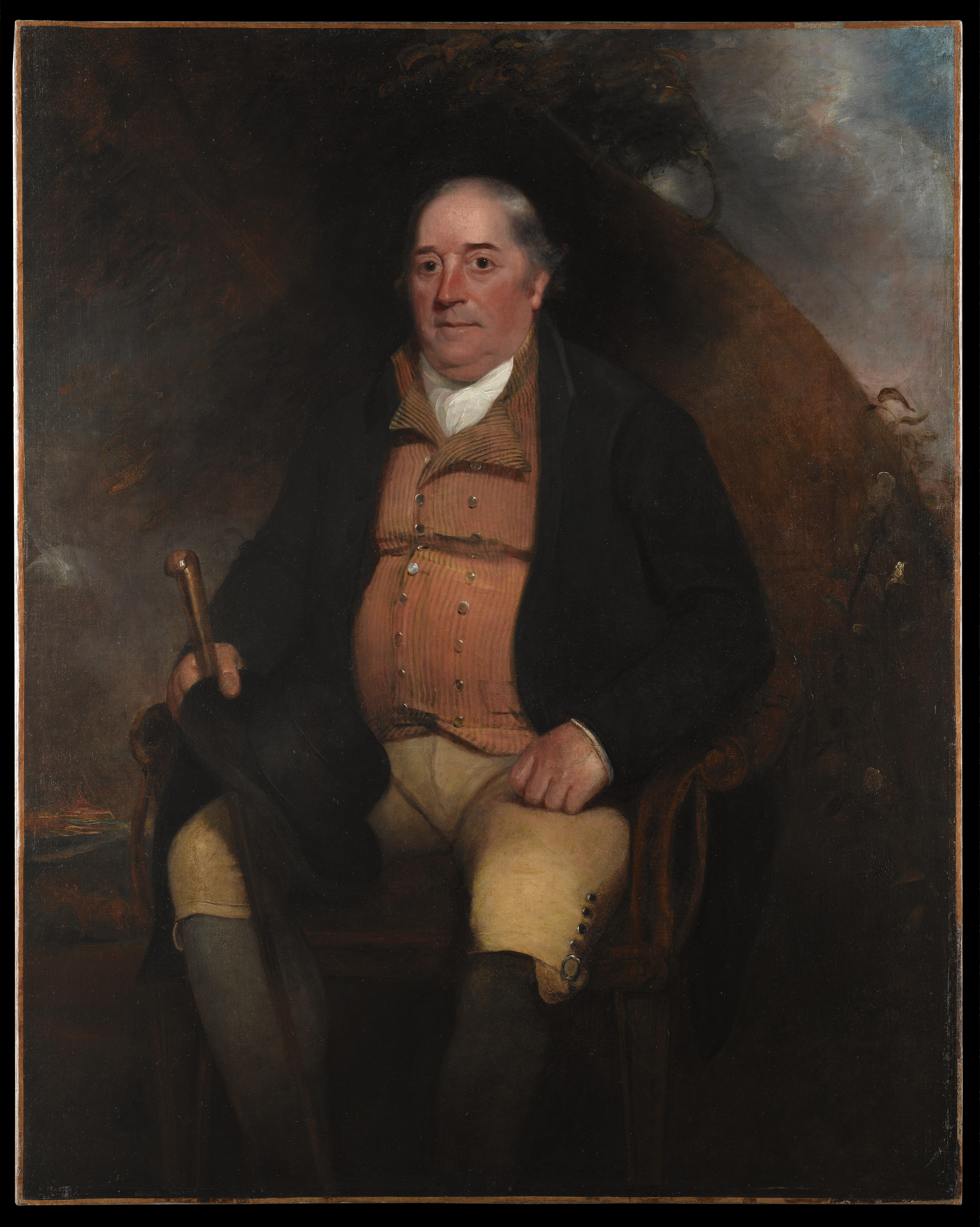
Benjamin Jesty by Michael William Sharp, 1805

Benjamin Jesty (c. 1736 – 16 April 1816) was a farmer at Yetminster and Worth Matravers in Dorset, England, notable for his early experiments in inducing immunity against smallpox using cowpox.

The notion that those people infected with cowpox, a relatively mild disease, were subsequently protected against smallpox was not an uncommon observation with country folk in the late 18th century, but Jesty was one of the first to intentionally administer the less virulent virus.

Unlike Edward Jenner, a medical doctor who is given broad credit for developing the smallpox vaccine in 1796, Jesty did not publicise his findings made some twenty years earlier in 1774.

== Early life ==
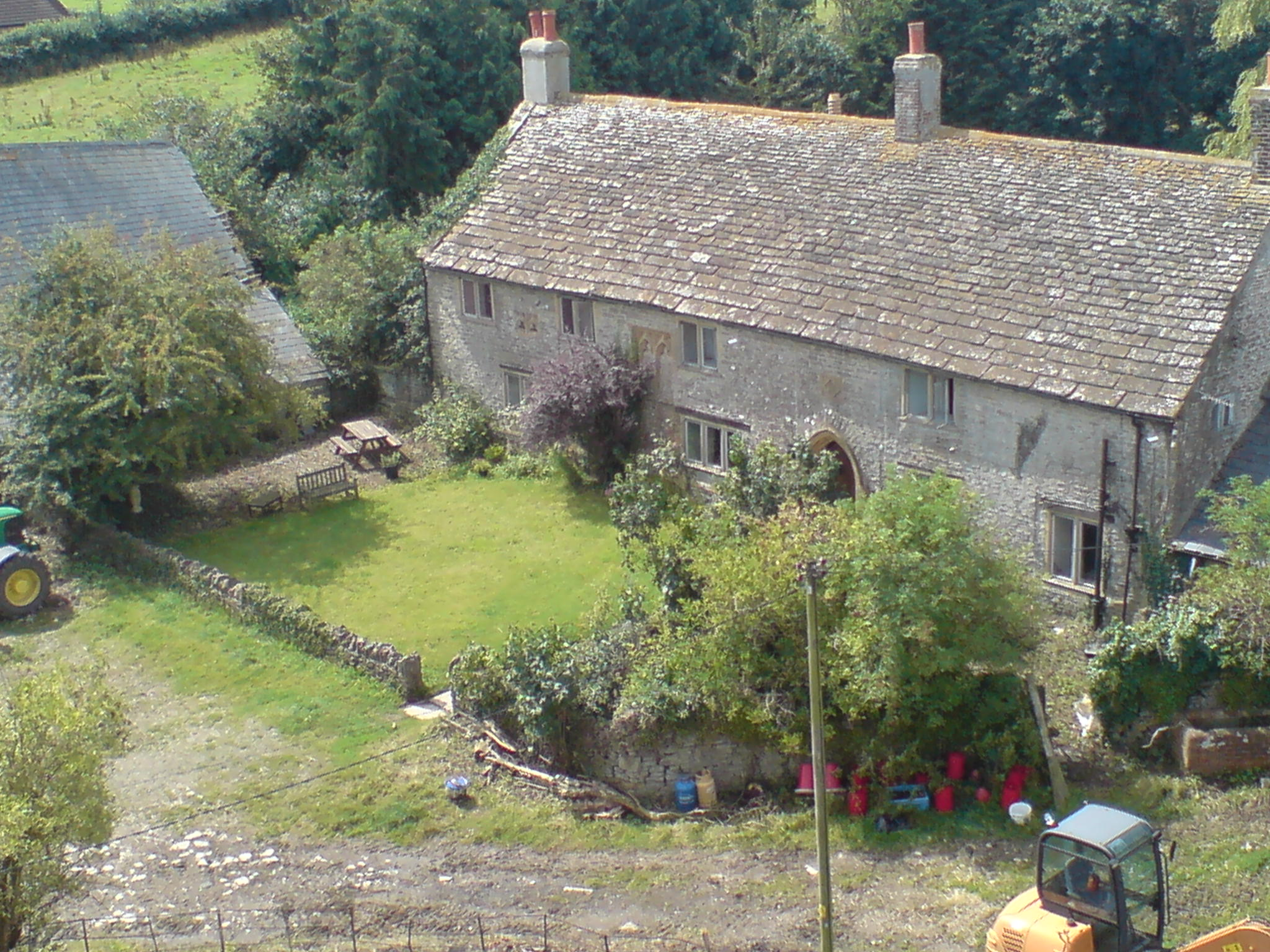
Upbury Farm at Yetminster, home to the Jesty family at the time that the pioneering inoculations took place

Jesty was born in Yetminster, Dorset, and baptized there on 19 August 1736, the youngest of at least four sons of Robert Jesty, who was a butcher. Little else is known of his early life. In March 1770 he married Elizabeth Notley (1740–1824) in Longburton, four miles north-east of Yetminster. The couple lived at Upbury Farm, next to Yetminster church, and the couple had four sons and three daughters.

== Jesty and smallpox ==
During the eighteenth century smallpox was widespread throughout England, with frequent epidemics. It was known in the dairy-farming areas in the south-west of the country that the milkmaids and other workers who contracted cowpox from handling cows' udders, were afterwards immune to smallpox. Such people were able to nurse smallpox victims without fear of contracting the disease themselves. This folk-knowledge gradually became more widely disseminated amongst the medical community: in 1765 a Dr John Fewster of Thornbury, Gloucestershire presented a paper to the Medical Society of London entitled "Cow pox and its ability to prevent smallpox", and Dr. Rolph, another Gloucestershire physician, stated that all experienced physicians of the time were aware of this.

Jesty and two of his female servants, Ann Notley and Mary Reade, had been infected with cowpox. When an epidemic of smallpox came to Yetminster in 1774, Jesty decided to try to give his wife Elizabeth and two eldest sons immunity by infecting them with cowpox. He took his family to a cow at a farm in nearby Chetnole that had the disease, and using a darning needle, transferred pustular material from the cow by scratching their arms. The boys had mild local reactions and quickly recovered but his wife's arm became very inflamed and for a time her condition gave cause for concern, although she too recovered fully in time.

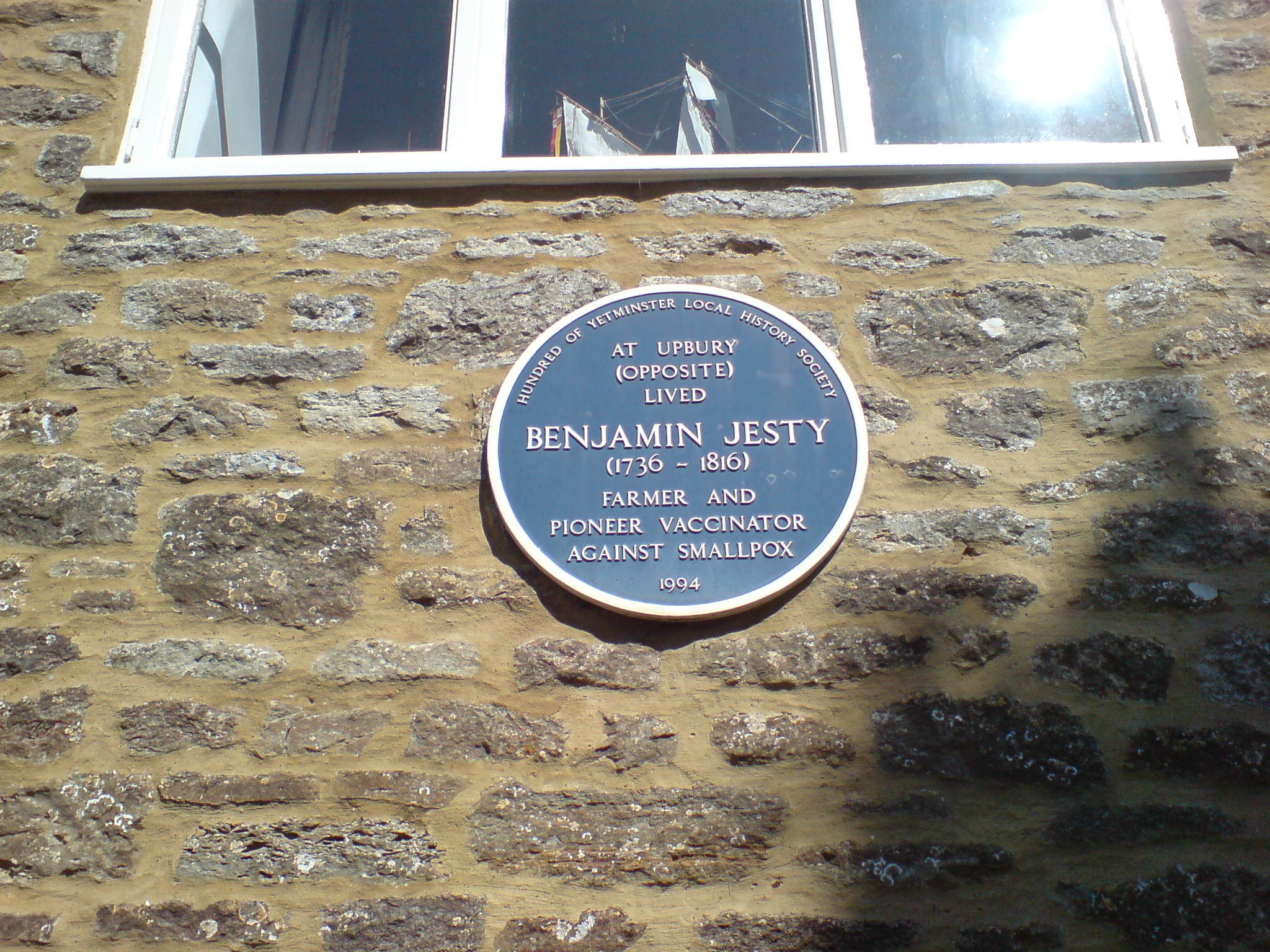
Blue plaque commemorating Jesty's pioneering work at Upbury Farm at Yetminster.

Jesty's experiment was met with hostility by his neighbours. He was labelled inhuman, and was "hooted at, reviled and pelted whenever he attended markets in the neighbourhood'". The introduction of an animal disease into a human body was thought disgusting and some even "feared their metamorphosis into horned beasts". But the treatment's efficacy was several times demonstrated in the years which followed, when Jesty's two elder sons, exposed to smallpox, failed to catch the disease.

Interest in the prophylactic powers of cowpox virus grew and Jesty was one of six English, Danish and German people (Sevel, Jensen and Jesty in 1774, Rendall and Plett in 1791) who reportedly administered cowpox to artificially induce immunity against smallpox from 1770 to 1791; only Jobst Bose of Göttingen, Germany, with his 1769 inoculations pre-dated Jesty's work. In May 1796, over 20 years after Jesty had made his inoculations, Edward Jenner began his series of vaccination experiments which established the link between cowpox infection and smallpox immunity. In about 1797 Jesty and his family moved from Yetminster, when Jesty took up the tenancy of Downshay Manor Farm in Worth Matravers near the Dorset coast. Here he came to the attention of Dr. Andrew Bell, rector of nearby Swanage who (possibly encouraged by Jesty's efforts) vaccinated over 200 of his parishioners in 1806.

== Recognition and final years ==
In June 1802 Jenner was given a reward of £10,000 from the House of Commons for discovering and promoting vaccination, and another award of £20,000 followed in 1807. Before this first amount had been awarded, George Pearson, founder of the Original Vaccine Pock Institution, had brought evidence before the House of Commons of Jesty's work in 1774, work which pre-dated Jenner's by 22 years. Unfortunately, Jesty's well-documented case was weakened by his failure to petition in person, and Pearson's inclusion of other claimants whose evidence could not be validated, so no reward was forthcoming.

Unaware of George Pearson's previous petitions to the Pitt Government about the Dorset farmer, the Reverend Dr. Andrew Bell, rector of Swanage near where Jesty later resided, prepared a paper dated 1 August 1803, proposing Jesty as the first vaccinator, and sent copies to the Original Vaccine Pock Institute and the member of parliament, George Rose. Bell wrote to the Institution again in 1804, having learned of Pearson's involvement.

In 1805, at Pearson's instigation and the institution's invitation, Jesty gave his evidence before 12 medical officers of the institution at its base on the corner of Broadwick Street and Poland Street in Soho. Robert, Jesty's oldest son (by then 28 years old) also made the trip to London and agreed to be inoculated with smallpox again to prove that he still had immunity. After Jesty had been cross-examined, he was presented with a long testimonial and pair of gold mounted lancets. The verbal evidence of their examination was published in the Edinburgh Medical and Surgical Journal.

Report from the Original Vaccine Pock Institute, 1805 "That he was led to undertake this novel practice in 1774 to counteract the small-pox, at that time prevalent at Yetminster, where he then resided, from knowing the common opinion of the country ever since he was a boy (now 60 years ago) that persons who had gone through the cowpock naturally, ie by taking it from cows, were insusceptible of the small-pox; by himself being incapable of taking the small-pox, having gone through the cow-pock many years before; from knowing many individuals, who, after the cowpock, could not have the small-pox excited; from believing that the cow-pock was an affection free from danger; and from his opinion that, by the cow-pock inoculation, he should avoid ingrafting various diseases of the human constitution, such as "the Evil (scrofula), madnes, lues (syphilis), and many bad humours," as he called them."

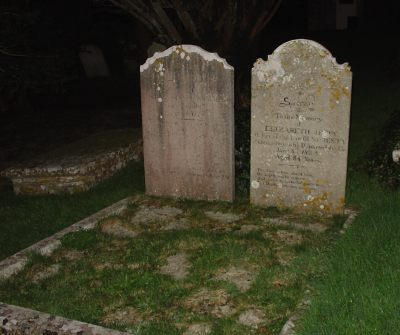
Graves of Benjamin (left) and Elizabeth (right) Jesty in the churchyard at Worth Matravers, Dorset.

For the event, Jesty's family had tried to persuade him to dress in a more up-to-date fashion, but he refused saying that "he did not see why he should dress better in London than in the country". Immediately after his interrogation, Jesty was taken round to the studio of the portrait painter Michael William Sharp in nearby Great Marlborough Street. Jesty proved an impatient sitter, and so Mrs Sharp played the piano to try to soothe him as Sharp painted. After a chequered history, the portrait is now owned by the Wellcome Trust and is on loan to the Dorset Museum in Dorchester.

On Sunday 15 July 1806, Bell preached the same sermon twice in honour of Jesty, "whose discovery of the efficacy of the cowpock against smallpox is so often forgotten by those who have heard of Dr Jenner".

Jesty died in Worth Matravers on 16 April 1816 and was buried in a prominent position in the parish churchyard. His widow, Elizabeth, died on 8 January 1824 and was buried alongside him. Both headstones are listed structures, primarily due to their historic interest. The full text on Jesty's headstone reads:

(Sacred) To the Memory OF Benj.in. Jesty (of Downshay) who departed this Life, April 16th 1816 aged 79 Years. He was born at Yetminster in this County, and was an upright honest Man: particularly noted for having been the first Person (known) that Introduced the Cow Pox by Inoculation, and who from his great strength of mind made the Experiment from the (Cow) on his Wife and two Sons in the Year 1774.
