= Walter Crawford =

Australian cricketer, British Army officer and British colonial official (1894-1978)

Personal information
- Full name: Walter Ferguson Crawford
- Born: 11 April 1894; Malvern, Victoria, Australia
- Died: 28 March 1978 (aged 83); Churt, Surrey, England
- Batting: Unknown
- Bowling: Unknown

Domestic team information
- Years: Team
- 1919: Oxford University

Career statistics
Competition	First-class
Matches	3
Runs scored	23
Batting average	4.60
100s/50s	–/–
Top score	11
Balls bowled	210
Wickets	3
Bowling average	45.33
5 wickets in innings	–
10 wickets in match	–
Best bowling	2/43
Catches/stumpings	3/–
- Source: Cricinfo, 22 August 2019

Sir Walter Ferguson Crawford KBE CMG (11 April 1894 – 28 March 1978) was an Australian first-class cricketer, British Army officer and British colonial official. Born in Australia, where he attended the University of Sydney, Crawford was chosen as New South Wales' Rhodes Scholar for 1915. He travelled to England and served in the British Army during World War I, before taking up his scholarship at Oxford in 1919, during which he played first-class cricket. After graduating, he became a British colonial official, mostly associated with Sudan and the Middle East.

== Early life and WWI ==
Crawford was born in the Melbourne suburb of Malvern in April 1894. He was educated in Sydney at the Sydney Grammar School, before studying art at St Paul's College at the University of Sydney. He was selected as the 1915 Rhodes Scholar for New South Wales. Crawford was en route to England when World War I commenced in July 1914. Arriving in England, he enlisted in the British Army as a second lieutenant in the Argyll and Sutherland Highlanders in June 1915. He was sent to France as part of the British Expeditionary Force in December 1915, where he was promoted to the rank of lieutenant and fought until he was wounded in action later in that year. He recovered from his wounds in hospital in England, before transferring to the 1st Battalion, Argyll and Sutherland Highlanders, spending the remainder of the war in Salonika.

== Post-war cricket and colonial service ==
After the war, Crawford took up his Rhodes Scholarship at New College, Oxford. While studying at Oxford, he made his debut in first-class cricket for the Gentlemen of England against Oxford University at Oxford in 1919. He played in two further first-class matches in 1919, appearing for Oxford University against the Australian Imperial Forces, and for P. F. Warner's XI against Oxford University.

After graduating from Oxford, he joined the Government Political Service in Mesopotamia. He was made an OBE in September 1921 and was appointed to the Order of the Nile in September 1932, marrying Marjorie Vivienne Shirley in between these appointments in 1927. He was the governor of Northern Province in Sudan from 1942–44, before serving as a liaison officer to the government of Palestine from 1944–46 and head of the Middle East Development Division at the Foreign Office from 1946–60, He was made a Companion, 3rd Class of the Order of St Michael and St George in the 1950 New Year Honours, before being knighted in the 1958 Birthday Honours. He served as the director-general of the Middle East Association from 1960–64. Crawford died in March 1978 at Churt, Surrey.
