= John Fewster =

English surgeon and apothecary (1738–1824)

- Born: 1738
- Died: 3 April 1824 (aged 86)
- Education: Bristol Grammar School; Bristol Infirmary
- Occupations: Surgeon; Apothecary
- Known for: His role in the discovery of the smallpox vaccine
- Spouse: Betty Tyson (m. 1770)

John Fewster (1738 – 3 April 1824) was a surgeon and apothecary in Thornbury, Gloucestershire. Fewster, a friend and professional colleague of Edward Jenner, played an important role in the discovery of the smallpox vaccine. In 1768 Fewster realized that prior infection with cowpox rendered a person immune to smallpox.

Fewster was educated at Bristol Grammar School before a seven-year apprenticeship at the Bristol Infirmary.

== Development of the smallpox vaccine ==
In 1768, Fewster noted that two brothers (named Creed) had both been variolated (purposefully infected with smallpox) but that one did not react at all to variolation. On questioning, this subject had never had smallpox, but had previously contracted cowpox. This prompted Fewster to wonder whether cowpox might protect against smallpox, a notion of which he was previously unaware. He is reported to have discussed this possibility over a Convivio-Medical Society dinner at the Ship Inn in Alveston. He also encouraged others to take up the inquiry. Amongst those at the meeting was Edward Jenner, a young medical apprentice at the time.

Fewster followed up this observation, but only to a limited extent and not in writing.

In 1796, Fewster was called to visit a local boy who was ill with early smallpox and was asked by John Player, the boy’s uncle, whether he would consider inoculating the boy with cowpox to save him from smallpox. According to Player Fewster replied that he had already thought of this but had decided against it as, in his view, variolation was very successful and an alternative seemed unnecessary. Nonetheless, Player reports, Fewster went on to inoculate three children in Thornbury with cowpox, during spring 1796. These vaccinations took place at around the same time as Jenner's first vaccination attempts.

Fewster never made any claim to have discovered vaccination.

== See also ==
- Williams, Gareth (2010). Angel of Death: The Story of Smallpox. Palgrave Macmillan. ISBN 978-0230274716.
- The Fewster Family - Apothecaries and Surgeons of Thornbury
- Edward Jenner
- Smallpox vaccine
