= Bifurcated needle =

Type of steel rod used to administer smallpox vaccine

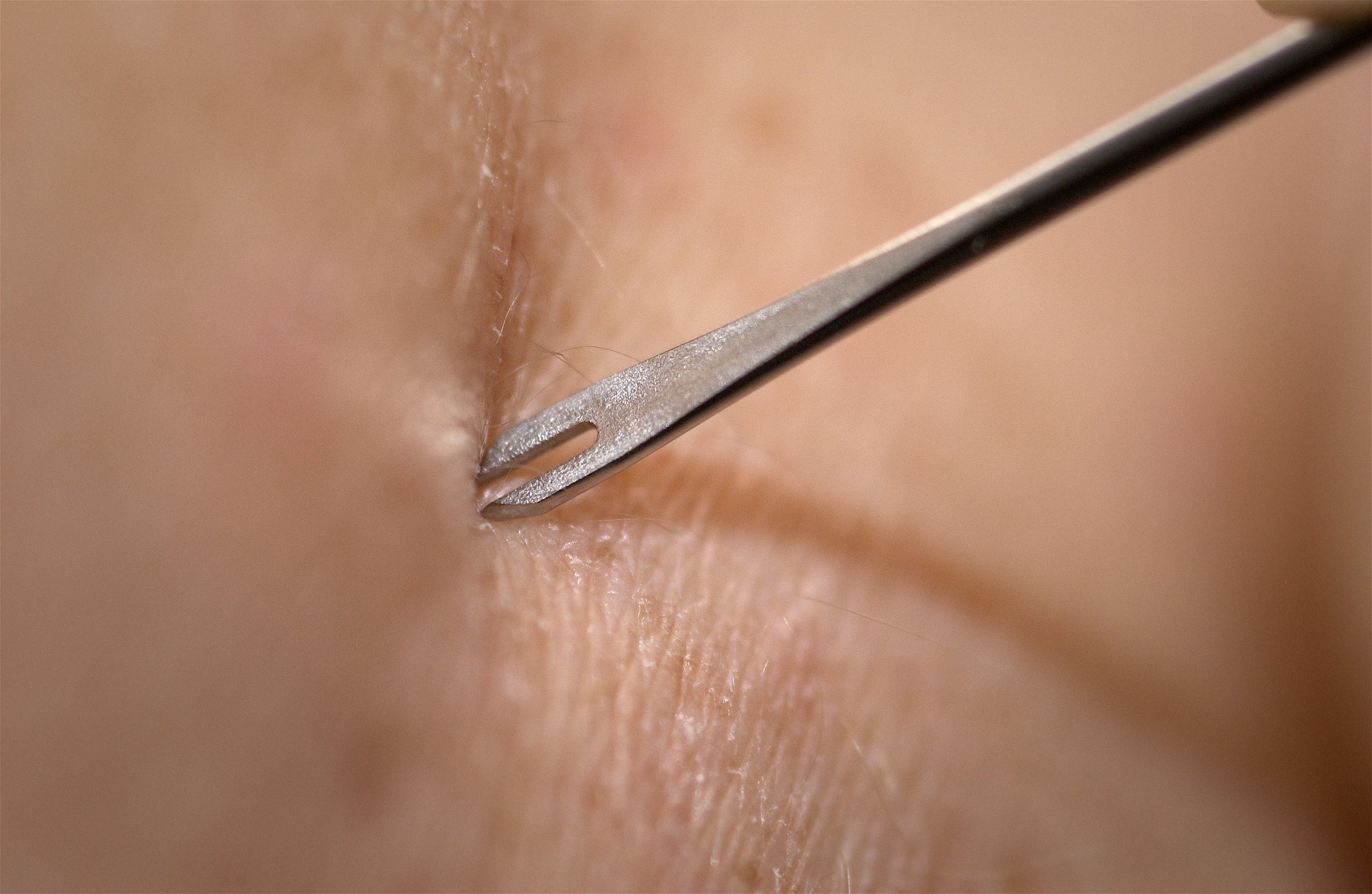
Smallpox vaccine being administered by the bifurcated needle.

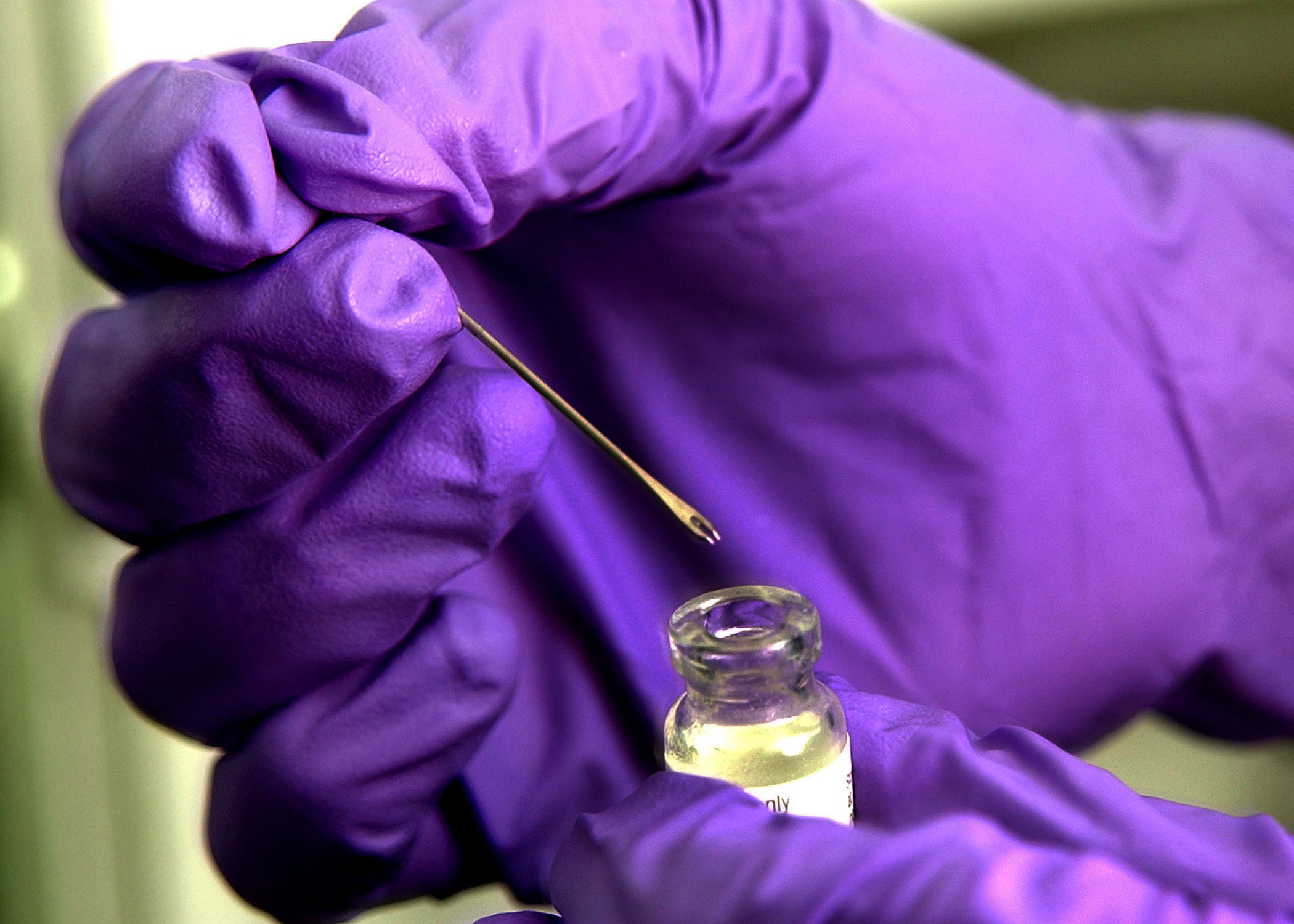
A hospital corpsman dips a bifurcated vaccination needle into an open vial of smallpox vaccine.

The bifurcated needle is a needle type known for its use during the World Health Organization smallpox eradication campaign.

== History ==
The bifurcated needle was invented in 1965 by microbiologist Benjamin Rubin, created from the eyelet of a sewing machine needle and initially intended for multiple pressure vaccination. It was repurposed specifically for smallpox vaccination by D.A. Henderson in 1967, who was the first to suggest holding the needle at a right angle to the skin and making 15 light, rapid punctures. This is now referred to as the multiple puncture method. Because of the forked construction, the needle does not penetrate deeply into the skin. The multiple puncture method was also found to be more successful for smallpox vaccination.

The bifurcated needle was adopted given its efficiency and cost effectiveness in comparison to the alternative jet injector previously in use. Bifurcated needles cost $5 USD per thousand at the time, and could be indefinitely boiled and reused. Their cost effectiveness and efficacy played an important role in the eradication effort's success; without the bifurcated needle, the eradication program may have failed.

Rubin estimated that it was used to administer 200 million vaccinations per year during the final years of the campaign.

An honorary, unofficial recognition was established by D.A. Henderson called the Order of the Bifurcated Needle. Individuals who played key roles in the global smallpox eradication effort were awarded a lapel badge designed from a bifurcated needle twisted into a circle, symbolizing the program's goal of Target Zero.

== Use ==
The bifurcated needle is a narrow steel rod, approximately 5 cm (2 in) long with two prongs at one end.

Between the two needle prongs, it can hold one dose of reconstituted freeze-dried smallpox vaccine. Up to one hundred vaccinations can be given from one vial of the reconstituted vaccine.

The established technique for smallpox vaccination is to dip the needle in the vaccine, and then perpendicularly puncture a person's upper arm fifteen times rapidly in a small circular area. Though skin in the area should be clean, use of an alcohol swab is optional and if used the skin must be allowed to fully dry to avoid deactivation of the live virus vaccine. The punctures should remain in an area approximately 5 mm in diameter. The needle is then disposed of or can be sterilized for reuse given its entirely metal construction.

When vaccination has been done correctly, a trace of blood appears at the vaccination site within 10 to 20 seconds after the procedure.
