= Charles Huxtable =

Charles Reginald Ralston Huxtable MC & Bar (30 September 1891–29 July 1980) was an Australian medical doctor who served in both World Wars and wrote about his experiences in the book From the Somme to Singapore: a Medical Officer in Two World Wars.

== Biography ==
Huxtable was commissioned a Temporary Lieutenant in the Royal Army Medical Corps in April 1915. He won the Military Cross in June 1917 and a bar in November 1917 whilst serving as a medical officer with the Lancashire Fusiliers during World War I. He resigned his commission as a captain in April 1918. During World War II he was captured in Singapore by the Japanese and imprisoned in Changi Prison.

Huxtable, then serving with the Royal Flying Doctor Service at Broken Hill, initiated the establishment of the Bush Children's Education Foundation in 1965.

He was shocked by the number of children who were not enrolled in any school and whose only contact with other children was through visits to a township. At that time there was no government provision for these children other than access to correspondence lessons.

Huxtable, along with the Chief Justice of New South Wales, Sir Leslie Herron, the Honourable Ian Sinclair and Ian Hardy, prepared a Trust Deed for the Foundation, which was approved by the NSW Attorney General.

It provided funding for isolated children to board at the purpose-built Tibooburra Hostel. Other similar hostels were located in the far west of New South Wales. The Foundation appealed for individual and corporate donations so that bursaries could enable children to board at one of these hostels in order to attend a country school.

In the early years the occupations of the families covered the range of outback working life: farmers, station hands, fencers, bore sinkers, kangaroo shooters, prospectors, miners, bush nurses, small business owners and itinerant circus/show people. Many of these occupations continue in the bush today, but now include parks and wildlife personnel and small business operators.

Ahead of public opinion at the time, the Foundation supported and continues to encourage indigenous families to apply for bursaries. They included the descendants of the Wadikali and Karengappa people, original tribal groups from the north west corner of New South Wales.

== Publications ==
From the Somme to Singapore: A Medical Officer in Two World Wars, Charles Huxtable, Kangaroo Press, 1987 ISBN 0-86417-745-3
