= Jim Phipps (footballer) =

Australian rules footballer

Personal information
- Full name: James Phipps
- Born: 20 April 1884; Fitzroy, Victoria
- Died: 17 September 1977 (aged 93); Gardenvale, Victoria

Playing career^{1}
Years	Club	Games (Goals)
1904–06	Essendon	22 (0)
- ^{1} Playing statistics correct to the end of 1906.

James Phipps (20 April 1884 – 17 September 1977) was an Australian rules footballer who played with Essendon in the Victorian Football League (VFL).
