= Benjamin Rubin =

American microbiologist (1917–2010)

Benjamin Rubin (September 27, 1917 in New York, New York – March 8, 2010) was an American microbiologist, known as the inventor of the bifurcated vaccination needle, which played an important role in the eradication of smallpox. Rubin invented this device by taking the eyelet of a sewing machine needle and grinding it down.

In 1992, Rubin was inducted into the National Inventors Hall of Fame.
