= List of immunologists =

This is a list of notable immunologists.

== Pioneers ==
- Edward Jenner (1749-1823), discovered that cowpox induces protection against smallpox
- Louis Pasteur (1822-1895), his experiments confirmed the germ theory of disease, he also created the first vaccine for rabies

== Nobel laureates ==
- 1901 Emil Adolf von Behring (1854-1917), "for his serum therapy to treat diphtheria" (First ever Nobel Prize in Physiology or Medicine)
- 1908 Eli Metchnikoff (1845-1916) and Paul Ehrlich (1854-1915), "for study of the immune system"
- 1919 Jules Bordet (1870-1961), "for discovery of the complement system in the immune system"
- 1930 Karl Landsteiner (1868-1943), "for discovery of human blood types"
- 1960 Peter B. Medawar (1915-1987) and Frank Macfarlane Burnet (1899-1985), "for the discovery that the immune system of the fetus learns how to distinguish between self and non-self"
- 1972 Gerald Maurice Edelman (1929-2014) and Rodney Robert Porter (1917-1985), "for discovering the chemical structure of antibodies"
- 1980 Baruj Benacerraf (1920-2011), Jean Dausset (1916-2009) and George Davis Snell (1903-1996), "for discovery of the Major histocompatibility complex genes which encode cell surface molecules important for the immune system's distinction between self and non-self"
- 1984 Niels Jerne (1911-1994), Georges J. F. Köhler (1946-1995) and César Milstein (1927-2002), "for work on the immune system and the production of monoclonal antibodies"
- 1987 Susumu Tonegawa (1939–2026), "for discovering how the large diversity of antibodies is produced genetically"
- 1989 J. Michael Bishop (1936-2026) and Harold E. Varmus (1939-), "for discovering the cellular origins of retroviral oncogenes"
- 1996 Peter C. Doherty (1940-) and Rolf M. Zinkernagel (1944-), "for describing how MHC molecules are used by white blood cells to detect and kill virus-infected cells."
- 2011 Bruce Beutler (1957-), Jules A. Hoffmann (1941-), "for their discoveries concerning the activation of innate immunity" and Ralph Marvin Steinman (1943-2011)"for his discovery of the dendritic cell and its role in adaptive immunity"
- 2018 James P. Allison (1948-) and Tasuku Honjo (1942-), "for their discovery of cancer therapy by inhibition of negative immune regulation."

== Notable immunologists ==
- Vital Brazil (1865–1950)
- Alan Aderem, innate immunity
- Akiko Iwasaki (1970-)
- Lorne Babiuk (1946-)
- Mike Belosevic (1951-)
- Kiril Bratanov (1911-1986), pioneer in the area of immunology of reproduction
- William Coley (1862-1936), pioneer of cancer immunotherapy
- Albert Coons (1912-1978), developed immunofluorescent techniques for labelling antibodies
- Max D. Cooper (1933-), identification of T and B cells
- Yehuda Danon (1940-)
- Deborah Doniach (1912-2004), organ-specific auto-immunity
- Eva Engvall (1940-), one of the scientists who invented ELISA in 1971.
- Anthony Fauci (1940-)
- Denise Faustman (1958-), Type 1 diabetes
- Daniela M. Ferreira, bacterial and respiratory infection
- William Frankland (1912-2020), popularisation of the UK pollen count, and prediction of increased penicillin allergy
- Ian Frazer (1953-), development of a cervical cancer vaccine
- Samuel O. Freedman (1928-), discovered Carcinoembryonic antigen
- Jules T. Freund (1890-1960)
- Sankar Ghosh
- John Grange (1943-2016)
- Waldemar Haffkine (1860-1930), first microbiologist who developed and used vaccines against cholera and bubonic plague.
- Michael Heidelberger (1888-1991), showed that antibodies are proteins
- George Heist (1886-1920)
- Leonard Herzenberg (1931-2013)
- Miroslav Holub (1923-1998)
- Charles Janeway (1943-2003), wrote the standard textbook Immunobiology
- Dermot Kelleher
- Tadamitsu Kishimoto (1939-)
- Jan Klein (1936-), Mhc
- Mary Loveless (1899-1991), insect venom allergy
- Tak Wah Mak (1946-), discovery of the T-cell receptor
- Alberto Mantovani
- Polly Matzinger (1947-), immunological tolerance, Danger Model, Hyppo Model
- Michelle McMurry-Heath, immunologist
- Ira Mellman
- Jacques Miller (1931-)
- Avrion Mitchison (1928-)
- Michael Neuberger (1953-2013)
- Evelyn Nicol (1930-2020)
- Alan Munro (1937-)
- Gustav Nossal (1931-)
- Santa J. Ono (1962-)
- Thomas Platts-Mills (1941-), discovered dust-mite allergen and alpha-gal allergy from tick bites
- Nicholas P. Restifo (1960-)
- Ivan Roitt (1927-)
- Jon van Rood (1926-2017), pioneer in the field of HLA and immunogenetics of transplantation, the founder of the international organ exchange organization Eurotransplant
- Mario Rosemblatt (1941-), who established that dendritic cells are responsible for imprinting the tissue-specific homing of T lymphocytes
- Fred Rosen (1930-2005), discovered the cause of X-linked hyper IgM syndrome
- Christopher E. Rudd (1963-), discovery of T-cell activation mechanisms via tyrosine kinases
- Shimon Sakaguchi (1948-), discovery of regulatory T cells
- Louis W. Sauer (1885-1980), perfected pertussis vaccine, developed diphtheria/p daertussis/tetanus vaccine
- Emil Skamene (1941-)
- Filip Swirski, professor, researcher and scientist, known for novel findings in Linking atherosclerosis with blood monocytosis (1974-)
- David Talmage (1919-2014), clonal selection theory
- James S. Tan (1927-2006)
- Reyes Tamez (1952-)
- Kevin J. Tracey (1957-)
- Jan Vilcek (1933-)
- Ellen Vitetta
- Alexander S. Wiener (1907-1976)
- Don Wiley (1944-2001), crystallography of HLA proteins
- Ian Wilson (biologist)
- Ernst Witebsky (1901-1969), isolation and partial characterization of A and B blood antigens
- Jian Zhou (1957-1999), with co-inventor Ian Frazer has priority for invention of Virus-like particle and HPV vaccine

== Immunologists in popular culture ==
- Allison Cameron, character on the television series House M.D.
