= Timeline of immunology =

Notable events in the history of immunology

The following are notable events in the Timeline of immunology:

- 1550 BCE – The Ebers papyrus recommends placing a poultice on a tumor and then making an incision, which would induce infection and cause regression of the tumor Information in the Ebbers papyrus is thought to be derived from the 27th century BCE writings of the Egyptian physician Imhotep.
- 1549 – The earliest account of inoculation of smallpox (variolation) occurs in Wan Quan's (1499–1582) Douzhen Xinfa (痘疹心法)
- 1718 – Smallpox inoculation in Ottoman Empire realized by West, and Henry Kipkosgei, recorded the positive effects of variolation
- 1761 – A case of breast cancer cured after ulcerating and getting infected is reported by Lambergen
- 1796 – First demonstration of smallpox vaccination (Edward Jenner)
- 1808–1813 – First experimental demonstration of the germ theory of disease (Agostino Bassi, though he does not formally propose the theory until 1844)
- 1813 – Vautier reports spontaneous remission of cancer after gangrene infection (later to be known as Clostridium perfringens)
- 1829 – Another case of spontaneous remission of breast cancer after a patient refused surgery and the tumor ruptured, became infected and during a febrile illness with purulent discharge, it shrunk and disappeared after a few weeks. (Guillaume Dupuytren)
- 1837 – Description of the role of microbes in putrefaction and fermentation (Theodore Schwann)
- 1838 – Confirmation of the role of yeast in fermentation of sugar to alcohol (Charles Cagniard-Latour)
- 1850 – Demonstration of the contagious nature of puerperal fever (childbed fever) (Ignaz Semmelweis)
- 1857–1870 – Confirmation of the role of microbes in fermentation (Louis Pasteur)
- 1862 – Phagocytosis (Ernst Haeckel)
- 1863 – Mast cells (Friedrich von Recklinghausen)
- 1867 – Aseptic practice in surgery using carbolic acid (Joseph Lister)
- 1868 – Busch discovered that a sarcoma patient being surgically intervened to remove the tumor, after being exposed to a patient suffering from erysipelas, got a skin infection and her tumor disappeared. He inoculated some other cancer patients with many successes
- 1876 – Demonstration that microbes can cause disease-anthrax (Robert Koch)
- 1878 – Confirmation and popularization of the germ theory of disease (Louis Pasteur)
- 1880 – 81 Theory that bacterial virulence could be attenuated by culture in vitro and used as vaccines. Used to make chicken cholera and anthrax "vaccines" (Louis Pasteur)
- 1882 – Identification of Streptococcus pyogenes as the causative agent of erysipelas (Friedrich Fehleisen). He repeats Busch experiments inoculating cancer patients with eryisipelas, noting tumor regression in many of them
- 1883–1905 – Cellular theory of immunity via phagocytosis by macrophages and microphages (polymorhonuclear leukocytes) (Elie Metchnikoff)
- 1885 – Introduction of concept of a "therapeutic vaccination". Report of a live "attenuated" vaccine for rabies (Louis Pasteur and Pierre Paul Émile Roux)
- 1888 – Identification of bacterial toxins (diphtheria bacillus) (Pierre Roux and Alexandre Yersin)
- 1888 – Bactericidal action of blood (George Nuttall)
- 1890 – Demonstration of antibody activity against diphtheria and tetanus toxins. Beginning of humoral theory of immunity. (Emil von Behring) and (Kitasato Shibasaburō)
- 1891 – Demonstration of cutaneous (delayed type) hypersensitivity (Robert Koch)
- 1893 – Use of live bacteria and bacterial lysates to treat tumors – "Coley's Toxins", based on Busch and Fehleisen experiences (William B. Coley)
- 1894 – Bacteriolysis (Richard Pfeiffer)
- 1896 – An antibacterial, heat-labile serum component (complement) is described (Jules Bordet)
- 1900 – Antibody formation theory (Paul Ehrlich)
- 1901 – 1907 - Blood groups (Karl Landsteiner, Jan Janský)
- 1902 – Immediate hypersensitivity anaphylaxis (Paul Portier) and (Charles Richet)
- 1903 – Intermediate hypersensitivity, the "Arthus reaction" (Maurice Arthus)
- 1903 – Opsonization
- 1905 – "Serum sickness" allergy (Clemens von Pirquet and (Bela Schick)
- 1909 – Paul Ehrlich proposes "immune surveillance" hypothesis of tumor recognition and eradication
- 1911 – 2nd demonstration of filterable agent that caused tumors (Peyton Rous)
- 1917 – Hapten (Karl Landsteiner)
- 1921 – Cutaneous allergic reactions (Otto Prausnitz and Heinz Küstner)
- 1924 – Reticuloendothelial system
- 1925 – Adjuvants (Gaston Ramon)
- 1938 – Antigen-Antibody binding hypothesis (John Marrack)
- 1940 – Identification of the Rh antigens (Karl Landsteiner and Alexander Weiner)
- 1942 – Anaphylaxis (Karl Landsteiner and Merill Chase)
- 1944 – hypothesis of allograft rejection
- 1945 – Coombs test a.k.a. antiglobulin test (AGT)
- 1946 – Identification of mouse MHC (H2) (George Snell and Peter A. Gorer)
- 1948 – Antibody production in plasma B cells (Astrid Fagraeus)
- 1949 – Growth of polio virus in tissue culture, neutralization, and demonstration of attenuation of neurovirulence (John Enders), (Thomas Weller) and (Frederick Robbins)
- 1951 – A vaccine against yellow fever
- 1953 – Graft-versus-host disease
- 1953 – Validation of immunological tolerance hypothesis
- 1957 – Clonal selection theory (Frank Macfarlane Burnet)
- 1957 – Discovery of interferon (Alick Isaacs and Jean Lindenmann)
- 1958–1962 – Discovery of human leukocyte antigens (Jean Dausset and others)
- 1959–1962 – Discovery of antibody structure (independently elucidated by Gerald Edelman and Rodney Porter)
- 1959 – Discovery of lymphocyte circulation (James Gowans)
- 1960 – Discovery of lymphocyte "blastogenic transformation" and proliferation in response to mitogenic lectins-phytohemagglutinin (PHA) (Peter Nowell)
- 1961–1962 Discovery of thymus involvement in cellular immunity (Jacques Miller)
- 1960 – Radioimmunoassay – (Rosalyn Sussman Yalow)
- 1961 – Demonstration that glucocorticoids inhibit PHA-induced lymphocyte proliferation (Peter Nowell)
- 1963 – Development of the plaque assay for the enumeration of antibody-forming cells in vitro by Niels Jerne and Albert Nordin
- 1963 – Gell and Coombs classification of hypersensitivity
- 1964–1968 – T and B cell cooperation in immune response
- 1965 – Discovery of lymphocyte mitogenic activity, "blastogenic factor" (Shinpei Kamakura) and (Louis Lowenstein), (J. Gordon) and (L.D. MacLean)
- 1965 – Discovery of "immune interferon" (gamma interferon) (E.F. Wheelock)
- 1965 – Secretory immunoglobulins
- 1967 – Identification of IgE as the reaginic antibody (Kimishige Ishizaka)
- 1968 – Passenger leukocytes identified as significant immunogens in allograft rejection (William L. Elkins and Ronald D. Guttmann)
- 1969 – The lymphocyte cytolysis Cr51 release assay (Theodore Brunner and Jean-Charles Cerottini)
- 1971 – ELISA is invented at Stockholm University (Peter Perlmann and Eva Engvall)
- 1972 – Structure of the antibody molecule
- 1972 – Discovery of invertebrate immunity (Hans G. Boman)
- 1973 – Dendritic Cells first described (Ralph M. Steinman)
- 1974 – Immune Network Hypothesis (Niels Jerne)
- 1974 – T-cell restriction to MHC (Rolf Zinkernagel and Peter C. Doherty)
- 1975 – Generation of monoclonal antibodies (Georges Köhler and César Milstein)
- 1975 – Discovery of Natural Killer cells (Rolf Kiessling, Eva Klein, Hans Wigzell)
- 1976 – Identification of somatic recombination of immunoglobulin genes (Susumu Tonegawa)
- 1980–1983 – Discovery and characterization of interleukins, 1 and 2 IL-1 IL-2 (Robert Gallo, Kendall A. Smith, Tadatsugu Taniguchi)
- 1981 – First description of an animal antimicrobial peptide in Cecropia silk moths
- 1983 – Discovery of the T cell antigen receptor TCR (Ellis Reinherz) (Philippa Marrack and John Kappler), (James Allison)
- 1983 – Discovery of HIV (Luc Montagnier, Françoise Barré-Sinoussi and Robert Gallo)
- 1985–1987 – Identification of genes for the T cell receptor
- 1986 – Hepatitis B vaccine produced by genetic engineering
- 1986 – Th1 vs Th2 model of T helper cell function (Timothy Mosmann)
- 1988 – Discovery of biochemical initiators of T-cell activation: CD4- and CD8-p56lck complexes (Christopher E. Rudd)
- 1990 – Gene therapy for SCID
- 1991 – Role of peptide for MHC Class II structure (Scheherazade Sadegh-Nasseri & Ronald N. Germain)
- 1992 – Discovery of transitional B cells (David Allman & Michael Cancro)
- 1994 – Danger model of immunological tolerance is described by Polly Matzinger at the NIH
- 1995 – First description of the function of the critical immune checkpoint CTLA-4 (James P. Allison)
- 1995 – Regulatory T cells (Shimon Sakaguchi)
- 1995 – First Dendritic cell vaccine trial reported (Mukherji et al.)
- 1995 – Discovery of the insect Imd NF-κB pathway
- 1996–1998 – Identification of Toll-like receptors as immune-regulating molecules
- 1997 – Discovery of the autoimmune regulator and the AIRE gene
- 2000 – Characterization of M1 and M2 macrophage subsets (Charles Mills)
- 2001 – Discovery of FOXP3 – the gene directing regulatory T cell development
- 2005 – Development of human papillomavirus vaccine (Ian Frazer)
- 2006 – Antigen-specific NK cell memory first reported by Ulrich von Andrian's group after discovery by Mahmoud Goodarzi
- 2010 – The first autologous cell-based cancer vaccine, Provenge, is approved by the FDA for the treatment of metastatic, asymptomatic stage IV prostate cancer
- 2010 – First immune checkpoint inhibitor, ipilimumab (anti-CTLA-4), is approved by the FDA for treatment of stage IV melanoma
- 2011 – Carl H. June reports first successful use of CAR T-cells expressing the 4-1BB costimulatory signaling domain for the treatment of CD19+ malignancies
- 2014 – A second class of immune checkpoint inhibitor (anti-PD-1) is approved by the FDA for the treatment of melanoma. Pembrolizumab and nivolumab are approved within months of each other
- 2016 – The role of dendritic cell expressed CTLA-4 in Th immune polarization is first described
- 2016 – A third class of immune checkpoint inhibitor, anti-PD-L1 (atezolizumab), is approved for the treatment of bladder cancer
- 2017 – First autologous CAR T-cell therapy tisagenlecleucel approved for the treatment of pediatric B-ALL; second autologous CAR T-cell therapy axicabtagene ciloleucel (Yescarta) is approved
- 2020 – The first mRNA vaccines (BNT162b2, mRNA-1273), are developed for SARS-CoV-2 infection; this new technology completed design, testing, and emergency approval in under one year
- 2022 – Fourth in class immune checkpoint inhibitor, anti-Lag3 (relatlimab), is approved in combination with anti-PD-1 for the treatment of metastatic melanoma
- 2025 – After completing phase I clinical trials in 2024 dubodencel, an autologous personalized dendritic cell vaccine platform, enters randomized trials for the treatment of newly diagnosed glioblastoma
