= Blood allergy test =

Blood allergy test may refer to:

- Radioallergosorbent test
- Basophil activation

== See also ==
- Allergy test
- Blood test
