= Engvall =

Engvall is a surname. Notable people with the surname include:

- Bill Engvall (born 1957), American stand-up comedian, actor, and television show host
- Eva Engvall (born 1940), scientist who invented ELISA
- Gustav Engvall (born 1996), Swedish professional football player
- Pierre Engvall (born 1996), Swedish professional ice hockey player
