= Heist =

A heist is a robbery or burglary, especially from an institution such as a bank or museum.

Heist may also refer to:

== Places ==
- Heist, Germany, a municipality in Schleswig-Holstein
- Heist-aan-Zee, West Flanders, Belgium
- Heist-op-den-Berg, Antwerp, Belgium

== People ==
- Al Heist (1927–2006), Major League Baseball outfielder
- George Heist (1886–1920), immunologist
- Hans-Joachim Heist (born 1949), German actor and comedian
- Monique van Heist (born 1972), Rotterdam-based Dutch fashion designer
- Heist., botanical standard author abbreviation for Lorenz Heister

== Film ==
- Le Temps des loups, 1970 French–Italian crime drama released in English as The Heist
- The Heist, aka Dollar$, a 1971 comedy directed by Richard Brooks
- The Heist (1976 film), a Mexican crime film
- The Heist, aka The Squeeze, a 1977 thriller directed by Michael Apted
- The Heist (1989 film), a made-for-TV thriller starring Pierce Brosnan
- Heist (2001 film), directed by David Mamet
- The Heist (2001 film), directed by Kurt Voss
- The Heist (2008 film), directed by Campbell Cooley
- The Maiden Heist, a 2009 film starring Morgan Freeman, released as The Heist in the UK
- Heist: Who Stole the American Dream?, a 2011 documentary
- Heist (2015 film), directed by Scott Mann
- The Heist (2024 film), directed by Aditya Awandhe

== Television ==
- Heist (2008 film), a British TV comedy-drama
- Heist (2006 TV series), American TV series
- Heist (2021 TV series), an American Netflix true crime documentary series
- The Heist (Derren Brown special) a 2006 reality program
- The Heist (TV series), a 2018-2020 British reality competition

=== Episodes ===
- "The Heist" (The Amazing World of Gumball)
- "The Heist" (American Dragon: Jake Long)
- "The Heist" (Chowder)
- "The Heist" (MacGyver)
- "The Heist" (The Outer Limits)
- "The Heist", 2015 episode of It's Not Crazy, It's Sports directed by Errol Morris

== Games ==
- Heist (video game), a planned video game canceled in 2010
- Payday: The Heist, a 2011 video game focused on various robberies

== Music ==
- ¡Heist!, a 2008 EP by The Lights Out
- The Heist (album), a hip-hop album by Macklemore & Ryan Lewis
- "Heist", a song by Lindsey Stirling from the album Shatter Me
- "Heist", a song by Ben Folds from the movie Over the Hedge

== Other uses ==
- The Heist (Silva novel), 2014, in the Gabriel Allon series
- K.S.K. Heist, a professional football club from Heist-op-den-Berg, Belgium

== See also ==
- Heist film, a subgenre of crime film based on planning and executing a significant robbery
- List of bank robbers and robberies
