= PNU =

PNU can stand for:

== Education ==
- Payame Noor University, Tehran, Iran headquarters and 500+ locations worldwide
- Pacific National University, Khabarovsk, Russia
- Philippine Normal University, Manila, Philippines
- Precarpathian National University, Ivano-Frankivsk, Ukraine
- Princess of Naradhiwas University, Narathiwat, Thailand
- Princess Nora bint Abdul Rahman University, Riyadh, Saudi Arabia
- Pusan National University, Busan, South Korea

== Other uses ==
- Party of National Unity, a Kenyan political party
- Penrith Nepean United, an association football club in New South Wales, Australia
- Protein nitrogen unit, a measure of the potency of the compounds used in allergy skin tests
