= Küstner =

Küstner is a German-language surname. Notable people with the surname include:

- Heinz Küstner (1897—1963), German gynecologist and obstetrician
- Joachim Küstner, guitarist for Dark Assault
- Karl Friedrich Küstner (1856−1936), German astronomer
- Otto Küstner (1849−1931), German gynecologist
