= Francois Dezoteux =

French medical doctor and surgeon (1724-1803)

- Born: 1 October 1724; Boulogne-sur-Mer
- Died: 2 February 1803 (aged 78); Versailles
- Citizenship: France

François Dezoteux (born 1724 in Boulogne-sur-Mer; died 1803 in Versailles) was a French medical doctor and surgeon.

== Biography ==
He took part as a military surgeon in the War of the Austrian Succession. In 1760 he became surgeon-major of the king's regiment. Appointed in Besançon, he managed to rehabilitate the vaccination of smallpox then lived for some time in England where he studied a new process, the Suttonian method, which he experimented on his return to France.

He had Louis XVI establish the school of military surgery in Paris, of which he was appointed head, and was promoted to inspector of military hospitals in 1789, a position he lost during the French Revolution.

He was the co-author of Traité historique et pratique de l’inoculation, which has been digitized by the Wellcome Collection.

== Bibliography ==
- Dezobry and Bachelet, Dictionary of biography, t. 1, Ch.Delagrave, 1876, p. 791
