= Emmanuel Timoni =

Ottoman Greek physician (1669-1718/1720)

- Εμμανουήλ Τιμόνης
- Born: 1669; Chios
- Died: 1718/1720
- Known for: Inoculation
- Scientific career
- Fields: medicine

Emmanuel Timoni or Emanuel Timonius (Greek: Εμμανουήλ Τιμόνης; 1669-1718/1720) was an Ottoman Greek physician from Chios. His father was a dragoman at the Sultan's court. He studied medicine and philosophy at the University of Oxford and the University of Padua. After his studies he became a physician at the Sultan's court in Constantinople.

Timoni and Giacomo Pylarini were responsible for introducing the idea of variolation to the United Kingdom when they independently wrote letters on the subject to the Royal Society.
