= Prausnitz–Küstner test =

Immunologic test for allergy diagnosis

- Purpose: allergic reaction to a specific antigen.

The Prausnitz–Küstner test (PK test, Prausnitz-Küstner reaction) is an immunologic test formerly used by physicians to determine if a patient has an allergic reaction to a specific antigen. The test has been replaced by the safer skin prick test. The PK test involves transferring serum from the test subject to another healthy person, essentially using the second person as a mixing vessel for antibodies and antigen. This is a pathway for transmission of blood-borne ailments like variant Creutzfeldt–Jakob disease, AIDS, and others, which is why the test is no longer recommended. Or in simple words, a test for the presence of immediate hypersensitivity in humans; test serum from an atopic individual is injected intradermally into a normal subject; the normal subject is challenged 24–48 hours later with the antigen suspected of causing the immediate hypersensitivity reaction in the atopic individual.

== Procedure ==
Serum, suspected to contain IgE antibodies, is drawn from the allergic (atopic) patient. This serum is injected intradermally into a non-allergic person. The suspected antigens are then intradermally injected into the non-allergic person 24–48 hours later. If the person being tested for an allergy has made antibodies for the antigen, this will cause a local reaction in the non-allergic person when the antibodies mix with the antigen. This demonstrates a type I hypersensitivity reaction, and the allergic reaction to the injected antigen is confirmed for the patient being tested. A positive PK test usually appears as a wheal and flare.

== Development ==
The test was developed by Otto Prausnitz and Heinz Küstner. The first PK test occurred in 1921 when Prausnitz injected Küstner's serum into his abdominal skin. Küstner had previously noted that he developed allergic symptoms after eating fish. After eating some fish, Prausnitz's skin became hot, red, and swollen at the site of the serum injection, confirming their hypothesis that Küstner was allergic to fish.

== Reversed PK test ==
A reversed Prausnitz–Küstner test involves injecting antibodies into the skin of a person who already has the antigen. A wheal and flare in the skin also demonstrates a positive reverse PK test.

== See also ==
- RAST test
- Skin allergy test
