= Radioallergosorbent test =

Allergy test using blood

- MeSH: D011852
- LOINC: 13834-7

A radioallergosorbent test (RAST) is a blood test using radioimmunoassay test to detect specific IgE antibodies in order to determine the substances a subject is allergic to. This is different from a skin allergy test, which determines allergy by measuring a person's skin reaction to different substances.

== Medical uses ==
The two most commonly used methods of confirming allergen sensitization are skin testing and allergy blood testing. Both methods are recommended by the NIH guidelines and have similar diagnostic value in terms of sensitivity and specificity.

Advantages of the allergy blood test range from: excellent reproducibility across the full measuring range of the calibration curve, it has very high specificity as it binds to allergen specific IgE, and extremely sensitive too, when compared with skin prick testing. In general, this method of blood testing (in-vitro, out of body) vs skin-prick testing (in-vivo, in body) has a major advantage: it is not always necessary to remove the patient from an antihistamine medication regimen, and if the skin conditions (such as eczema) are so widespread that allergy skin testing cannot be done. Allergy blood tests, such as ImmunoCAP, are performed without procedure variations, and the results are of excellent standardization.

Adults and children of any age can take an allergy blood test. For babies and very young children, a single needle stick for allergy blood testing is often more gentle than several skin tests. However, skin testing techniques have improved. Most skin testing does not involve needles and typically skin testing results in minimal patient discomfort.

Drawbacks to RAST and ImmunoCAP techniques do exist. Compared to skin testing, ImmunoCAP and other RAST techniques take longer to perform and are less cost effective. Several studies have also found these tests to be less sensitive than skin testing for the detection of clinically relevant allergies. False positive results may be obtained due to cross-reactivity of homologous proteins or by cross-reactive carbohydrate determinants (CCDs).

In the NIH food guidelines issued in December 2010 it was stated that "The predictive values associated with clinical evidence of allergy for ImmunoCAP cannot be applied to other test methods." With over 4000 scientific articles using ImmunoCAP and showing its clinical value, ImmunoCAP is perceived as "Gold standard" for in vitro IgE testing

== Method ==
The RAST is a radioimmunoassay test to detect specific IgE antibodies to suspected or known allergens for the purpose of guiding a diagnosis about allergy. IgE is the antibody associated with Type I allergic response: for example, if a person exhibits a high level of IgE directed against pollen, the test may indicate the person is allergic to pollen (or pollen-like) proteins. A person who has outgrown an allergy may still have a positive IgE years after exposure.

The suspected allergen is bound to an insoluble material and the patient's serum is added. If the serum contains antibodies to the allergen, those antibodies will bind to the allergen. Radiolabeled anti-human IgE antibody is added where it binds to those IgE antibodies already bound to the insoluble material. The unbound anti-human IgE antibodies are washed away. The amount of radioactivity is proportional to the serum IgE for the allergen.

RASTs are often used to test for allergies when:

- a physician advises against the discontinuation of medications that can interfere with test results or cause medical complications;
- a patient has severe skin conditions such as widespread eczema or
- a patient has such a high sensitivity level to suspected allergens that any administration of those allergens might result in potentially serious side effects.

== Scale ==
The RAST is scored on a scale from 0 to 6:

RAST Rating	IgE Level (kU/L)	Comment
0	level < 0.35	Absent or undetectable allergen specific IgE
1	0.35 ≤ level < 0.70	Low level of allergen specific IgE
2	0.70 ≤ level < 3.50	Moderate level of allergen specific IgE
3	3.50 ≤ level < 17.50	High level of allergen specific IgE
4	17.50 ≤ level < 50.00	Very high level of allergen specific IgE
5	50.00 ≤ level < 100.00	Ultra high level of allergen specific IgE
6	level ≥ 100.00	Extremely high level of allergen specific IgE

== History ==
The market-leading RAST methodology was invented and marketed in 1974 by Pharmacia Diagnostics AB, Uppsala, Sweden, and the acronym RAST is actually a brand name. In 1989, Pharmacia Diagnostics AB replaced it with a superior test named the ImmunoCAP Specific IgE blood test, which literature may also describe as: CAP RAST, CAP FEIA (fluorenzymeimmunoassay), and Pharmacia CAP. A review of applicable quality assessment programs shows that this new test has replaced the original RAST in approximately 80% of the world's commercial clinical laboratories, where specific IgE testing is performed. The newest version, the ImmunoCAP Specific IgE 0–100, is the only specific IgE assay to receive FDA approval to quantitatively report to its detection limit of 0.1kU/L. This clearance is based on the CLSI/NCCLS-17A Limits of Detection and Limits of Quantitation, October 2004 guideline.The guidelines for diagnosis and management of food allergy issues by the National Institute of Health state that:

In 2010 the United States National Institute of Allergy and Infectious Diseases recommended that the RAST measurements of specific immunoglobulin E for the diagnosis of allergy be abandoned in favor of testing with more sensitive fluorescence enzyme-labeled assays.

== See also ==
- Prausnitz-Küstner test
- Skin allergy test
