= Inoculation =

Method of inducing immunity against disease

Inoculation is the act of implanting a pathogen or other microbe or virus into a person or other organism. It is a method of artificially inducing immunity against various infectious diseases. The term "inoculation" is also used more generally to refer to intentionally depositing microbes into any growth medium, as into a Petri dish used to culture the microbe, or into food ingredients for making cultured foods such as yoghurt and fermented beverages such as beer and wine. This article is primarily about the use of inoculation for producing immunity against infection. Inoculation has been used to eradicate smallpox and to markedly reduce other infectious diseases such as polio. Although the terms "inoculation", "vaccination", and "immunization" are often used interchangeably, there are important differences. Inoculation is the act of implanting a pathogen or microbe into a person or other recipient; vaccination is the act of implanting or giving someone a vaccine specifically; and immunization is the development of disease resistance that results from the immune system's response to a vaccine or natural infection.

== Terminology ==
Until the early 1800s inoculation referred only to variolation (from the Latin word variola = smallpox), the predecessor to the smallpox vaccine. The smallpox vaccine, introduced by Edward Jenner in 1796, was called cowpox inoculation or vaccine inoculation (from Latin vacca 'cow'). Smallpox inoculation continued to be called variolation, whereas cowpox inoculation was called vaccination (from Jenner's term variolae vaccinae 'smallpox of the cow'). Louis Pasteur proposed in 1861 to extend the terms vaccine and vaccination to include the new protective procedures being developed. Immunization refers to the use of vaccines as well as the use of antitoxin, which contains pre-formed antibodies such as to diphtheria or tetanus exotoxins. In nontechnical usage inoculation is now more or less synonymous with protective injections and other methods of immunization.

Inoculation also has a specific meaning for procedures done in vitro (in glass, i.e. not in a living body). These include the transfer of microorganisms into and from laboratory apparatus such as test tubes and petri dishes in research and diagnostic laboratories, and also in commercial applications such as brewing, baking, oenology (wine making), and the production of antibiotics. For example, blue cheese is made by inoculating it with Penicillium roqueforti mold, and often certain bacteria.

In insects, viruses may be injected into a region of the body to test its infectivity. Intrathoracic inoculation is a type of inoculation used largely on mosquitoes.

== Etymology ==
The term inoculate entered medical English through horticultural usage meaning to graft a bud from one plant into another. It derives from Latin in- 'in' + oculus 'eye' (and by metaphor, 'bud'). (The term innocuous is unrelated, as it derives from Latin in- 'not' + nocuus 'harmful'.)

== Origins ==
Inoculation originated as a method for the prevention of smallpox by deliberate introduction of material from smallpox pustules from one person into the skin of another. The usual route of transmission of smallpox was through the air, invading the mucous membranes of the mouth, nose, or respiratory tract, before migrating throughout the body via the lymphatic system, resulting in an often severe disease.

In contrast, infection of the skin usually led to a milder, localized infection – but, crucially, still induced immunity to the virus. This first method for smallpox prevention, smallpox inoculation, is now also known as variolation. Inoculation has ancient origins, and the technique was known in Africa, China, Circassia and India.

=== China ===
The earliest hints of the practice of inoculation for smallpox in China come during the 10th century. A Song dynasty (960–1279) chancellor of China, Wang Dan (957–1017), lost his eldest son to smallpox and sought a means to spare the rest of his family from the disease, so he summoned physicians, wise men, and magicians from all across the empire to convene at the capital in Kaifeng and share ideas on how to cure patients of it until an allegedly divine man from Mount Emei carried out inoculation. However, the sinologist Joseph Needham states that this information comes from the Zhongdou xinfa (種痘心法) written in 1808 by Zhu Yiliang, centuries after the alleged events.

The first clear and credible reference to smallpox inoculation in China comes from Wan Quan's (1499–1582) Douzhen Xinfa (痘疹心法) of 1549, which states that some women unexpectedly menstruate during the procedure, yet his text did not give details on techniques of inoculation. Inoculation was first vividly described by Yu Chang in his book Yuyi cao (寓意草), or Notes on My Judgment, published in 1643. Inoculation was reportedly not widely practiced in China until the reign of the Longqing Emperor (r. 1567–1572) during the Ming dynasty (1368–1644), as written by Yu Tianchi in his Shadou Jijie (痧痘集解) of 1727, which he alleges was based on Wang Zhangren's Douzhen Jinjing Lu (痘疹金鏡錄) of 1579. From these accounts, it is known that the Chinese banned the practice of using smallpox material from patients who actually had the full-blown disease of Variola major (considered too dangerous); instead they used proxy material of a cotton plug inserted into the nose of a person who had already been inoculated and had only a few scabs, i.e. Variola minor. This was called "to implant the sprouts", an idea of transplanting the disease which fit their conception of beansprouts in germination. Needham quotes an account from Zhang Yan's Zhongdou Xinshu (種痘新書), or New book on smallpox inoculation, written in 1741 during the Qing dynasty (1644–1912), which shows how the Chinese process had become refined up until that point:

Method of storing the material. Wrap the scabs carefully in paper and put them into a small container bottle. Cork it tightly so that the activity is not dissipated. The container must not be exposed to sunlight or warmed beside a fire. It is best to carry it for some time on the person so that the scabs dry naturally and slowly. The container should be marked clearly with the date on which the contents were taken from the patient.

In winter, the material has yang potency within it, so it remains active even after being kept from thirty to forty days. But in summer the yang potency will be lost in approximately twenty days. The best material is that which had not been left too long, for when the yang potency is abundant it will give a 'take' with nine persons out of ten people – and finally it becomes completely inactive, and will not work at all. In situations where new scabs are rare and the requirement great, it is possible to mix new scabs with the more aged ones, but in this case more of the powder should be blown into the nostril when the inoculation is done.

Two reports on the Chinese practice were received by the Royal Society in London in 1700; one by Dr. Martin Lister who received a report by an employee of the East India Company stationed in China and another by Clopton Havers. But no action was taken.

=== Circassia ===
According to Voltaire (1742), the Turks derived their use of inoculation from neighboring Circassia.

The Circassian women have, from time immemorial, communicated the small-pox to their children when not above six months old by making an incision in the arm, and by putting into this incision a pustule, taken carefully from the body of another child. This pustule produces the same effect in the arm it is laid in as yeast in a piece of dough; it ferments, and diffuses through the whole mass of blood the qualities with which it is impregnated. The pustules of the child in whom the artificial small-pox has been thus inoculated are employed to communicate the same distemper to others. There is an almost perpetual circulation of it in Circassia; and when unhappily the small-pox has quite left the country, the inhabitants of it are in as great trouble and perplexity as other nations when their harvest has fallen short...

Voltaire does not speculate on where the Circassians derived their technique from, though he reports that the Chinese have practiced it "these hundred years". The Turkish practice was presented to the Royal Society in 1714 and 1716, when the physicians Emmanuel Timoni and Giacomo Pylarini independently sent letters from Istanbul.

=== India ===
The French scholar Henri Marie Husson once noted in the journal Dictionaire des sciences médicales that inoculation was mentioned in the Ayurvedic text Sact'eya Grantham. However, it is not stated whether this method of inoculation was used specifically for the prevention of smallpox, and the original text of the Sact'eya Grantham has not been found. The idea that inoculation originated in India has also been taken into account, although there is little evidence in ancient Sanskrit medical texts clearly describing the practice. Variolation is documented in India from the eighteenth century, thanks to the 1767 account by the Irish-born surgeon John Zephaniah Holwell. Holwell's extensive 1767 description included the following, that points to the connection between disease and "multitudes of imperceptible animalculae floating in the atmosphere":

They lay it down as a principle, that the immediate cause of the smallpox exists in the mortal part of every human and animal form; that the mediate (or second) acting cause, which stirs up the first, and throws it into a state of fermentation, is multitudes of imperceptible animalculae floating in the atmosphere; that these are the cause of all epidemical diseases, but more particularly of the small pox.

Holwell ascribes this account to his Brahman informants. Doctors who performed variolation were known as Tikadars. However, such a theory has not yet been discovered in any Sanskrit or vernacular treatise.

By the 18th century, variolation was widely practiced in India. Several historians have suggested that variolation may be older than the 18th century in India. Oliver Coult in 1731 wrote that it had been "first performed by Dununtary a physician of Champanagar". However these reports have been called into question. The original ancient text describing this method has not been found. There is no evidence in these that variolation was practiced. Since the claim that it was an ancient practice in India has been rejected, there is no reason to assume that it began there.

Vaccinations were introduced to India in 1802, when 3-year-old girl in Mumbai received a smallpox vaccine, making her the first person to take a vaccine in India. The widespread rumour since the nineteenth century that vaccination was documented in India before the discoveries of Edward Jenner can all be traced to propaganda tracts written in Sanskrit and the Indian vernaculars by colonial officers, in the hope of convincing pious Indians to accept the newly discovered Jennerian procedure and abandon older variolation practices. A landmark anthropological study by Ralph Nicholas described the mid-twentieth century rituals of appeasement to Śītalā, the Indian goddess of smallpox, in Bengal.

=== Ethiopia ===
Early travellers to Ethiopia report that variolation was practiced by the Amhara and Tigray peoples. The first European to report this was Nathaniel Pearce, who noted in 1831 that it was performed by a debtera who would collect "a quantity of matter" from a person with the most sores from smallpox, then "cuts a small cross with a razor in the arm" of his subject and puts "a little of the matter" into the cut which was afterwards bound up with a bandage. Subsequent visitors who described this practice included the British traveller William Cornwallis Harris and Dr. Petit of the French scientific mission of 1839–1841.

=== West Africa ===
Inoculation against smallpox seems to have been known to West Africans, more specifically the Ga-Adangbe people of Accra. An enslaved African named Onesimus in the Province of Massachusetts Bay explained the inoculation procedure to Cotton Mather during the 18th century; he reported to have acquired the knowledge from Africa.

== Introduction in Europe and North America ==
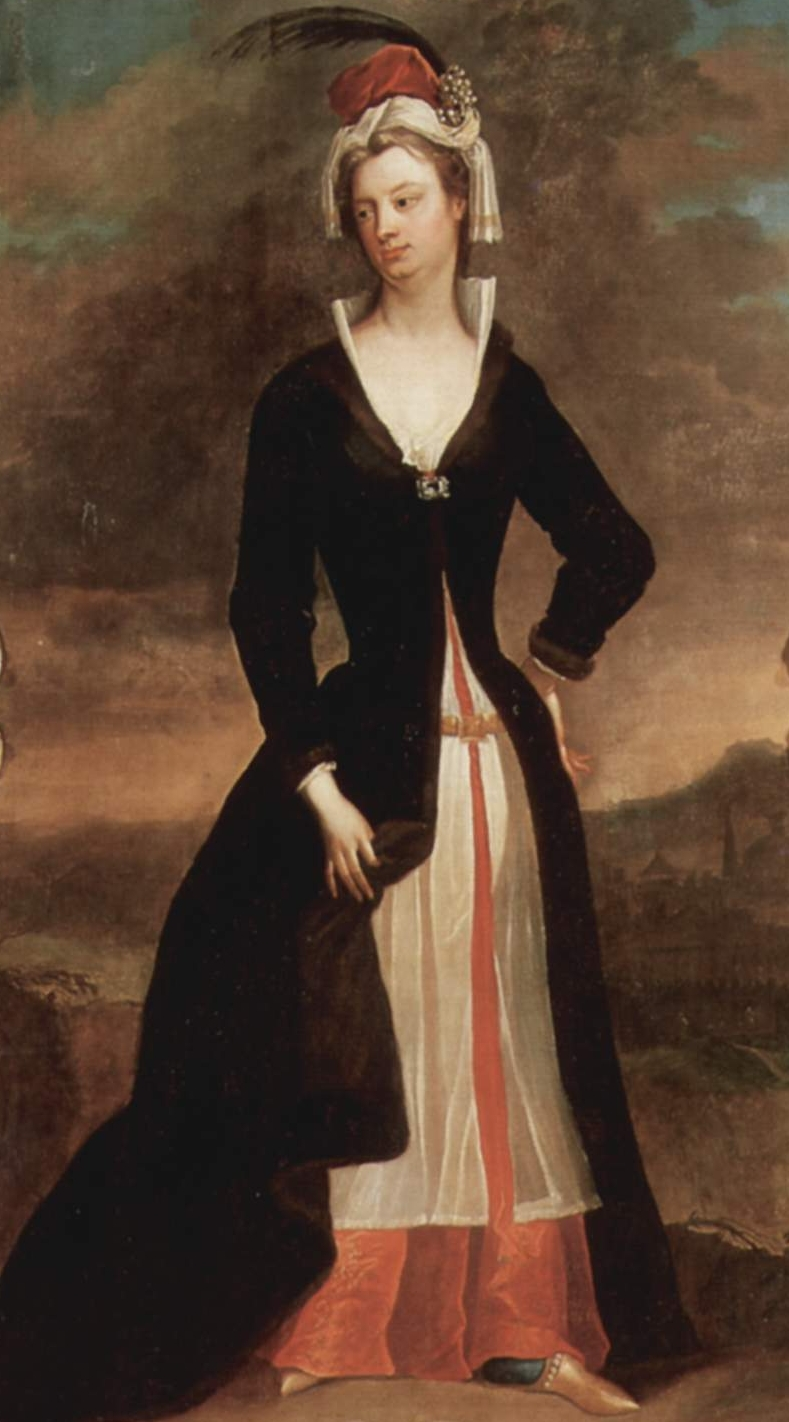
Mary Wortley Montagu, by Charles Jervas, after 1716

Most Old World diseases of known origin can be traced to Africa and Asia and were introduced to Europe over time. Smallpox originated in Africa or Asia, plague in Asia, cholera in Asia, influenza in Asia, malaria in Africa and Asia, measles from Asian rinderpest, tuberculosis in Asia, yellow fever in Africa, leprosy in Asia, typhoid in Africa, syphilis in America and Africa, herpes in Africa, zika in Africa. Thus the necessity of immunity through inoculation did not arise until those diseases were introduced in Europe.

In January 1714 the Philosophical Transactions of the Royal Society published an account of a letter John Woodward had received from Emmanuel Timonius in Istanbul.

The practice was introduced to England by Lady Mary Wortley Montagu. Lady Montagu's husband, Edward Wortley Montagu, served as the British ambassador to the Ottoman Empire from 1716 to 1718. She witnessed firsthand the Ottoman use of inoculation in Istanbul, and was greatly impressed: she had lost a brother to smallpox and bore facial scars from the disease herself. When a smallpox epidemic threatened England in 1721, she called on her physician, Charles Maitland, to inoculate her daughter. She invited friends to see her daughter, including Sir Hans Sloane, the King's physician. Sufficient interest arose that Maitland gained permission to test inoculation at Newgate Prison on six prisoners due to be hanged in exchange for their freedom, an experiment which was witnessed by a number of notable doctors. All survived, and in 1722 the Prince of Wales' daughters received inoculations.

The practice of inoculation slowly spread amongst the royal families of Europe, usually followed by more general adoption amongst the people.

The practice is documented in America as early as 1721, when Zabdiel Boylston, at the urging of Cotton Mather, successfully inoculated two slaves and his own son. Mather, a prominent Boston minister, had heard a description of the African practice of inoculation from Onesimus, an enslaved man in his household, in 1706 and later from Timoni's report to the Royal Society. However, Mather had been previously unable to convince local physicians to attempt the procedure. Following this initial success, Boylston began performing inoculations throughout Boston, despite much controversy and at least one attempt upon his life. The effectiveness of the procedure was proven when, of the nearly three hundred people Boylston inoculated during the outbreak, only six died, whereas the mortality rate among those who contracted the disease naturally was one in six. Boylston traveled to London in 1724. There he published his results and was elected to the Royal Society in 1726.

Natural experiment in inoculation around Boston, 1721
| | Total | Died | % Mortality |
| Variolated | c. 300 | 6 | c. 2% |
| Unvariolated | c. 6000 | c. 1000 | "about 14%" |

In France, considerable opposition arose to the introduction of inoculation, and it was banned by the Parlement. Voltaire, in his Lettres Philosophiques, wrote a criticism of his countrymen for being opposed to inoculation and having so little regard for the welfare of their children, concluding that "had inoculation been practised in France it would have saved the lives of thousands."

Likewise, in the United States, the Continental Congress issued a proclamation in 1776 prohibiting Surgeons of the Army from performing inoculations. However, in 1777, George Washington, witnessing the virulent spread of smallpox, and fearing the likelihood of mass transmission of the disease throughout the Continental Army, weighed the risks and overruled this prohibition, conducting smallpox inoculation of all troops. He wrote, "Should the disorder infect the Army in the natural way and rage with its usual virulence, we have more to dread from it than from the sword of the enemy." This was the first mass inoculation of an army, and was successful, with only isolated infections occurring, and no regiments incapacitated by the disease.

Inoculation grew in popularity in Europe through the 18th century. Given the high prevalence and often severe consequences of smallpox in Europe in the 18th century (according to Voltaire, there was a 60% incidence of first infection, a 20% mortality rate, and a 20% incidence of severe scarring), many parents felt that the benefits of inoculation outweighed the risks and so inoculated their children.

== Mechanism ==
Two forms of the disease of smallpox were recognised, now known to be due to two strains of the Variola virus. Those contracting Variola minor had a greatly reduced risk of death – 1–2% – compared to those contracting Variola major with 30% mortality. Infection via inhaled viral particles in droplets spread the infection more widely than the deliberate infection through a small skin wound. The smaller, localised infection is adequate to stimulate the immune system to produce specific immunity to the virus, while requiring more generations of the virus to reach levels of infection likely to kill the patient. The rising immunity terminates the infection. This ensures the less fatal form of the disease is the one caught, and gives the immune system the best start possible in combating it.

Inoculation in the East was historically performed by blowing smallpox crusts into the nostril. In Britain, Europe and the American Colonies the preferred method was rubbing material from a smallpox pustule from a selected mild case (Variola minor) into a scratch between the thumb and forefinger. This would generally be performed when an individual was in normal good health, and thus at peak resistance. The recipient would develop smallpox; however, due to being introduced through the skin rather than the lungs, and possibly because of the inoculated individual's preexisting state of good health, the small inoculum, and the single point of initial infection, the resulting case of smallpox was generally milder than the naturally occurring form, produced far less facial scarring, and had a far lower mortality rate. As with survivors of the natural disease, the inoculated individual was subsequently immune to re-infection.

== Obsolescence ==
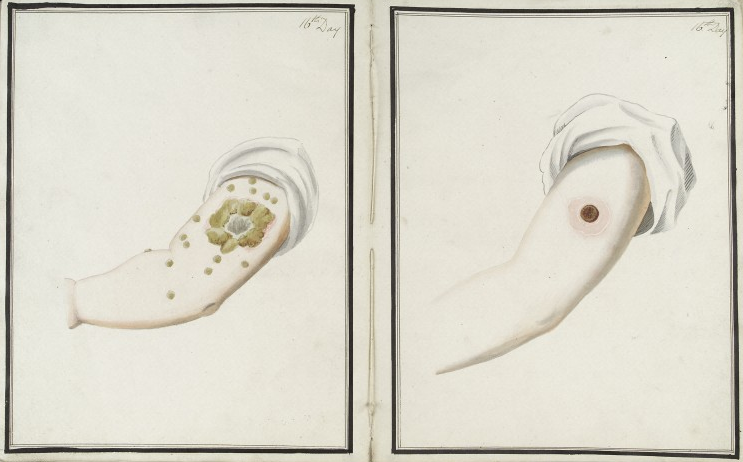
A 1802 comparison of smallpox (left) and cowpox (right) inoculations 16 days after administration

In 1798, British physician Edward Jenner published the results of his experiments and thus introduced the far superior and safer method of inoculation with cowpox virus, a mild infection that also induced immunity to smallpox. Jenner was the first to publish evidence that it was effective, and to provide advice on its production. His efforts led to smallpox inoculation falling into disuse, and eventually being banned in England in 1840.

== See also ==
- Psychological resilience (also known as stress inoculation)
