= Giacomo Pylarini =

- Ιάκωβος Πυλαρινός
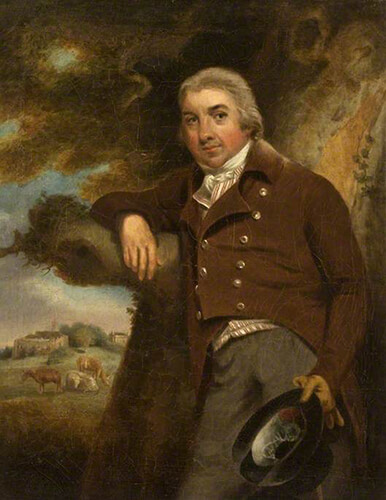
- Giacomo Pylarini
- Born: 1659; Lixouri, Cefalonia
- Died: 1718 (aged 58–59); Padua
- Known for: Inoculation
- Scientific career
- Fields: medicine

Giacomo Pylarini or Jacobus Pylarinus or Iacob Pylarino (Greek: Ιάκωβος Πυλαρινός; 1659–1718) was a Greek physician and consul for the republic of Venice in Smyrna. In 1715 he became the first person to have an account of the practice of inoculation published by the Royal Society.

He studied law and then medicine at the University of Padua before qualifying as a physician. He travelled to different parts of Asia and Africa and practised both at Smyrna and Constantinople. In Moscow he was appointed physician to the Russian Tsar Peter the Great.

He returned to Smyrna for the second time and resided there as the Venetian Consul as well as practising physician.

Together with another Greek doctor called Emmanuel Timoni, he introduced variolation to Western Europe through their writing from Constantinople.
