= Cross-reactive carbohydrate determinants =

Cross-reactive carbohydrate determinants (CCDs) play a role in the context of allergy diagnosis. The terms CCD or CCDs describe protein-linked carbohydrate structures responsible for the phenomenon of cross-reactivity of sera from allergic patients towards a wide range of allergens from plants and insects. In serum-based allergy diagnosis, antibodies of the IgE class directed against CCDs therefore give the impression of polysensitization. Anti-CCD IgE, however, does not seem to elicit clinical symptoms. Diagnostic results caused by CCDs are therefore regarded as false positives.

== Structural basis ==
When in 1981 Rob Aalberse from the University of Amsterdam noticed the enormous cross-reactivity of some patients´ sera against virtually any plant and even insects, notably, insect venoms, it took ten years to arrive at a possible structural explanation of this phenomenon. In 1991, Japanese researchers determined the structure of the epitope common to horseradish peroxidase and Drosophila neurons as being an asparagine-linked oligosaccharide (N-glycan) containing a xylose and a core-linked α1,3-linked fucose residue. These structural features are not present in humans and animals. Core α1,3-fucose was then found to be relevant for the binding of patients´ IgE to honeybee venom allergens, which contain N-glycans with structural similarities to plant N-glycans. Ever since then, core α1,3-fucose emerged as the structural element most relevant as a CCD in plants and insect allergens. Much later, both xylose and core α1,3-fucose were revealed as heart pieces of two independent glycan epitopes for rabbit IgG. The occurrence of human anti-xylose IgE, however, has not been verified so far. Still, because of the two possible epitopes and the different carrier structures, the plural CCDs is in frequent use even though core α1,3-fucose appears to be the single culprit.

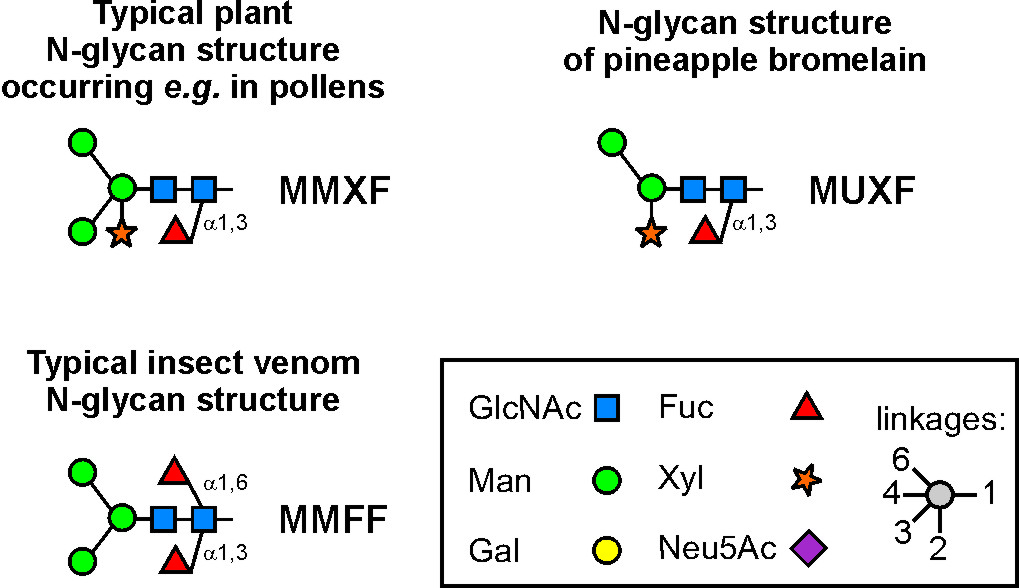
Examples of cross-reactive plant and insect N-glycans. Their common relevant feature is the core alfa1,3-linked fucose.

== Clinical and diagnostic relevance ==
IgE antibodies against plant/insect CCD determinants were shown to have both strict specificity and high affinity, so in principle they might be expected to lead to clinical symptoms just as habitual for anti-peptide IgE. In vitro experiments (histamine-release tests) with polyvalent glyco-allergens corroborated this view. Provocation tests with patients as well as empirical evidence however, indicate that CCDs never cause any ponderable allergic symptoms. It is assumed that the frequent contact with CCD containing foods induces tolerance akin a specific immune therapy.

== Other CCDs ==
While α-galactose as a part of glycoprotein glycans from vertebrates other than higher apes was known for a long time as being a prominent xeno-antigen, its implication in allergy only began to materialize when complications during treatment with a recombinant monoclonal antibody (Erbitux) were attributed to IgE directed against α-Gal containing N-glycans on this antibody. The incidencies of anaphylaxis due to Erbitux were confined to a certain area in the eastern United States, which raised speculations about the involvement of a particular type of tick endemic in this area. However, IgE antibodies against the α-Gal epitope should be taken into account in the diagnosis of milk and meat allergy. It is currently largely unexplored whether this type of CCD is generally also clinically irrelevant such as the plant/insect CCDs. The very localized case of Erbitux complications points at a possible if rare clinical significance of α-Gal. Yet other potentially immunogenic carbohydrates with widespread occurrence such as N-Glycolylneuraminic acid, which does not occur in humans, or plant O-glycans (arabinogalactans and arabinans) may be mentioned but have so far not qualified as either IgE or as cross-reactive determinants.

Literature:
