= Cross-reactivity =

Reaction between an antibody and an antigen that differs from the immunogen

Cross-reactivity, in a general sense, is the reactivity of an observed agent which initiates reactions outside the main reaction expected. This has implications for any kind of test or assay, including diagnostic tests in medicine, and can be a cause of false positives. In immunology, the definition of cross-reactivity refers specifically to the reaction of the immune system to antigens. There can be cross-reactivity between the immune system and the antigens of two different pathogens, or between one pathogen and proteins on non-pathogens, which in some cases can be the cause of allergies.

== In medical testing ==
In medical tests, including rapid diagnostic tests, cross-reactivity can be either confounding or helpful, depending on the instance. An example of confounding that yields a false positive error is in a latex fixation test when agglutination occurs with another antigen rather than the antigen of interest. An example of helpful cross-reactivity is in heterophile antibody tests, which detect Epstein-Barr virus using antibodies with specificity for other antigens. Cross-reactivity is also a commonly evaluated parameter for the validation of immune and protein binding based assays such as ELISA and RIA. In this case it is normally quantified by comparing the assay's response to a range of similar analytes and expressed as a percentage. In practice, calibration curves are produced using fixed concentration ranges for a selection of related compounds and the midpoints (IC50) of the calibration curves are calculated and compared. The figure then provides an estimate of the response of the assay to possible interfering compounds relative to the target analyte.

=== Applications in drug development ===
Tissue cross-reactivity assay is a standard method based on immunohistochemistry, required prior to phase I human studies for therapeutic antibodies.

In drug screening, because many urine drug screens use immunoassays there is a certain amount of cross-reactivity. Certain drugs or other chemicals can give a false positive for another category of drug.

== In immunology ==
In immunology, cross-reactivity has a more narrow meaning of the reaction between an antibody and an antigen that differs from the immunogen. It is sometimes also referred to as cross-immunity or cross-protective immunity, although cross-reactivity does not necessarily confer cross-protection. In some cases, the cross-reactivity can be destructive, and immune response to one pathogen can interfere with or lower the immune response to a different pathogen.

An adaptive immune response is specific to the antigen that stimulated it (called the immunogen). However, many naturally occurring apparent antigens are actually a mixture of macromolecules (for example, from pathogens, toxins, proteins, or pollen) comprising several epitopes. Contact with a complex antigen such as a virus will stimulate multiple immune responses to the virus' different macromolecules as well as the individual epitopes of each macromolecule. For example, the tetanus toxin is a single protein macromolecular antigen but will stimulate many immune responses due to the tertiary structure of the protein yielding many different epitopes. The toxin that creates the immune response will have an epitope on it that stimulates the response. Denaturing the protein may 'disarm' its function but allow the immune system to have an immune response thus creating an immunity without harming the patient.

Cross reactivity has implications for flu vaccination because of the large number of strains of flu, as antigens produced in response to one strain may confer protection to different strains. Cross-reactivity need not be between closely related viruses, however; for example, there is cross-reactivity between influenza virus-specific CD8+ T cells and hepatitis C virus antigens.

=== Allergies ===
Cross reactivity may also occur between a pathogen and a protein found on a non-pathogen (for example, food). There may even be cross reactivity between two non-pathogens; for example, Hevein-like protein domains are a possible cause for allergen cross-reactivity between latex and banana.

Some of the most common cross-reactions occur between tree pollen allergens (e.g., birch) and allergens in raw fruit and vegetables. Most patients allergic to birch show sensitivity to the major birch pollen allergen, Bet v 1, as well as to the major apple allergen CRD, Mal d 1, and the soy allergen, Gly m 4.

Cross-reactivity may be caused by identical carbohydrate structures on unrelated proteins from the same or different species. Such cross-reactive carbohydrate determinants (CCDs) are an issue in allergy diagnosis, where about a fifth of all patients displays IgE antibodies against Asn-linked oligosaccharides (N-glycans) containing core α1,3-linked fucose. As CCDs apparently do not elicit allergic symptoms, a positive in vitro test based on IgE binding to CCDs must be rated as false positive.

Although allergic reactions typically require prior sensitization to a specific allergen, clinical symptoms can sometimes occur upon first exposure to a food or substance; this is explained by IgE cross-reactivity, where prior sensitization to structurally homologous proteins from other sources leads the immune system to recognize similar proteins in the new allergen as triggers, even though the affected individual has never previously consumed or contacted it.
