= Allergy test =

Medical procedures to detect allergic sensitization

- Allergy test on arm (skin prick test)
- Purpose: Detect allergies

Allergy testing can help confirm or rule out allergies and consequently reduce adverse reactions and limit unnecessary avoidance and medications.

Correct allergy diagnosis, counseling and avoidance advice based on valid allergy test results is of utmost importance and can help reduce the incidence of symptoms, and the need for medications and improve quality of life. A healthcare provider can use the test results to identify the specific allergic triggers that may be contributing to the symptoms. Using this information, along with a physical examination and case history, the doctor can diagnose the cause of the symptoms and tailor treatments that will help the patient feel better. A negative result can help the doctor rule out allergies in order to consider other possibilities. Ruling out allergies is as important as confirming them to limit unnecessary avoidance, worry and negative social impact.

== Types of tests ==
NIH guidelines for the diagnosis and management of food allergy and the diagnosis and management of asthma recommend either allergy blood testing or skin prick testing to reliably determine allergic sensitization.

=== Blood test ===
For an allergy blood test, a sample of the patient's blood is sent to a laboratory for analysis. Allergy blood tests measure the presence of IgE antibodies to specific foods, pollens, mites, animals, insects and other environmental factors. (IgE, short for "immunoglobulin E", is the antibody that triggers food allergy symptoms.) The doctor looks at the test results to help determine if the patient has allergies. Allergy blood tests are not affected by antihistamine use and can be performed for people with extensive rashes that prevent using skin prick tests. For babies and young children, a single needle stick for allergy blood testing is often more gentle than several skin tests.

Advances in serological diagnostics have led to the development of multiparametric immunoassays capable of simultaneous antibody detecion. A study evaluating the Polycheck ® Celiac IgA + total IgA test reported high sensitivity and specificity for TG2 IgA and total IgA measurements in coeliac disease diagnostics.

Component-resolved diagnostics (CRD) enables the identification of specific allergen molecules responsible for sensitization, providing more precise information about a patient's sensitization profile. Molecular diagnostics help distinguish primary sensitization from cross-reactivity, assess the risk of severe allergic reactions (including anaphylaxis) and implement personalized treatment strategies. Multiplex assays such as ALEX® allow simultaneous analysis of IgE antibodies against numerous allergen extracts and molecular components.

=== Skin allergy test ===
Skin allergy testing comprises a range of methods for medical diagnosis of allergies that attempts to provoke a small, controlled, allergic response.

==== Skin prick test ====
For a skin prick test, a patient is pricked with a series of needles that contain extracts of allergic triggers. The doctor looks for strong reactions like welts or red bumps to determine if the patient has allergies. This method, although unpleasant for young children and people who dislike needle pricks, is beneficial because the person may discover an acute allergy with specially trained healthcare staff available to stop life-threatening allergic reactions such as an unexpected anaphylactic reaction. It may also allow the person to be prescribed tools for intervention needed if anaphylaxis ever occurs again, such as a mobile epinephrine pen. Epinephrine acts quickly to vasoconstrict, increasing blood flow to vital organs, and relaxing the smooth muscles in the airway, allowing the patient to breathe until emergency services arrive.

==== Patch test ====
Patch testing helps identify which substances may be causing a delayed-type allergic reaction in a patient and may identify allergens not identified by blood testing or skin prick testing. It is intended to produce a local allergic reaction on a small area of the patient's back, where the diluted chemicals were planted. The chemicals included in the patch test kit are the offenders in approximately 85–90 percent of contact allergic eczema and include chemicals present in metals (e.g., nickel), rubber, leather, formaldehyde, lanolin, fragrance, toiletries, hair dyes, medicine, pharmaceutical items, food, drink, preservative, and other additives.
