= Eva Engvall =

Swedish biochemist

Eva Engvall (born 1940) is one of the scientists who invented ELISA in 1971. She is an elected fellow of the American Association for the Advancement of Science.

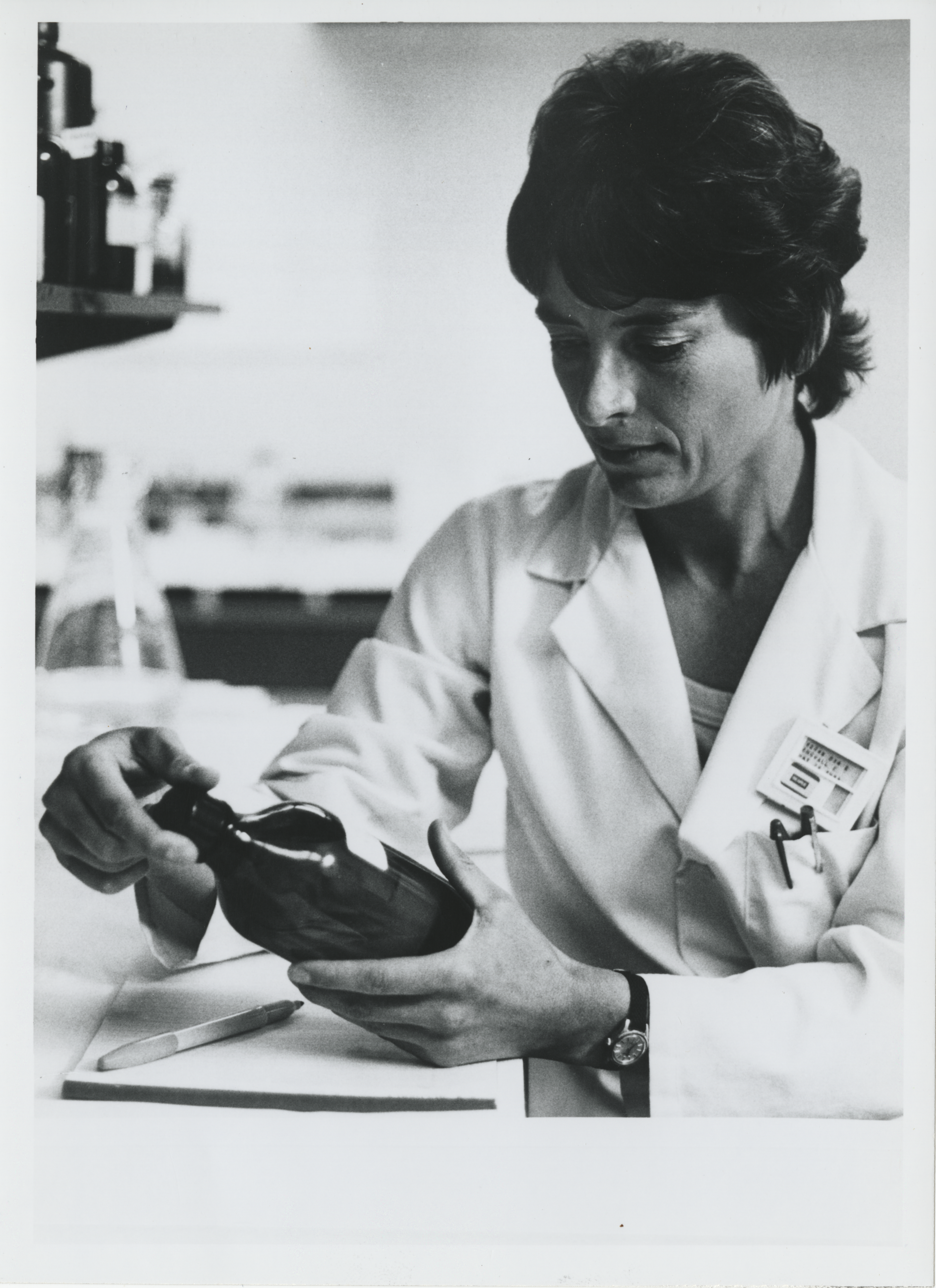

== Life ==
Eva Engvall earned her PhD from the Stockholm University in 1975. Her postdoctoral work was done at the University of Helsinki and City of Hope National Medical Center in California, where she was subsequently appointed to staff. In 1979, Engvall was recruited to Sanford-Burnham Medical Research Institute in La Jolla, California (then called La Jolla Cancer Research Foundation). From 1993 to 1996, Engvall held joint appointments at Sanford-Burnham Medical Research Institute and as Chairperson of the Department of Developmental Biology at Stockholm University.

== Research ==
Enzyme-linked immunosorbent assay (ELISA) uses antibodies to detect proteins and other different immunogens. Eva Engvall was one of the two Swedish scientists at Stockholm University (the other was the principal investigator Peter Perlmann) who conceptualized and developed the ELISA technique. Engvall and Perlmann published their first paper on ELISA in 1971 and demonstrated its quantitative value using alkaline phosphatase as the reporter.

Eva Engvall applied the ELISA measurement tool to parasitology [e.g., malaria and trichinosis], microbiology, and oncology. At Sanford Burnham Prebys Medical Discovery Institute, where Engvall was a professor from 1979 to 2005, she developed a form of ELISA, called “two-site” ELISA, that was tailored to using then new monoclonal antibodies. Various forms of ELISA, including two-site ELISA continue to be widely used in clinical medicine, veterinary and agriculture applications.

Engvall subsequently turned her interest to extracellular matrix biochemistry. She discovered the affinity of fibronectin to gelatin (denatured collagen), demonstrating the potential of these two matrix components to form a complex in tissues. She also devised a simple, one-step purification of fibronectin by gelatin affinity chromatography that enabled many advances in fibronectin research. The paper describing these findings has been cited 2,300 times in the literature. Engvall also discovered the second member of the laminin family of matrix proteins, initially named merosin, and showed that mutations in this protein are the cause of the second most common form of muscular dystrophy.

== Awards and honors ==
Perlmann and Engvall were honored for their invention when they received the German scientific award of the "Biochemische Analytik" in 1976, 5 years after they had published their first papers. Engvall received an honorary degree in Medicine from the University of Copenhagen in November 1994. Engvall was elected a fellow of the American Association for the Advancement of Science in 2020.

== See also ==
- ELISA
- Antibody
- Immunohistochemistry
- Immunology
- History of immunology
- List of immunologists
- Diagnosis
- Sanford Burnham Prebys Medical Discovery Institute
