= Skin allergy test =

Allergy diagnosis

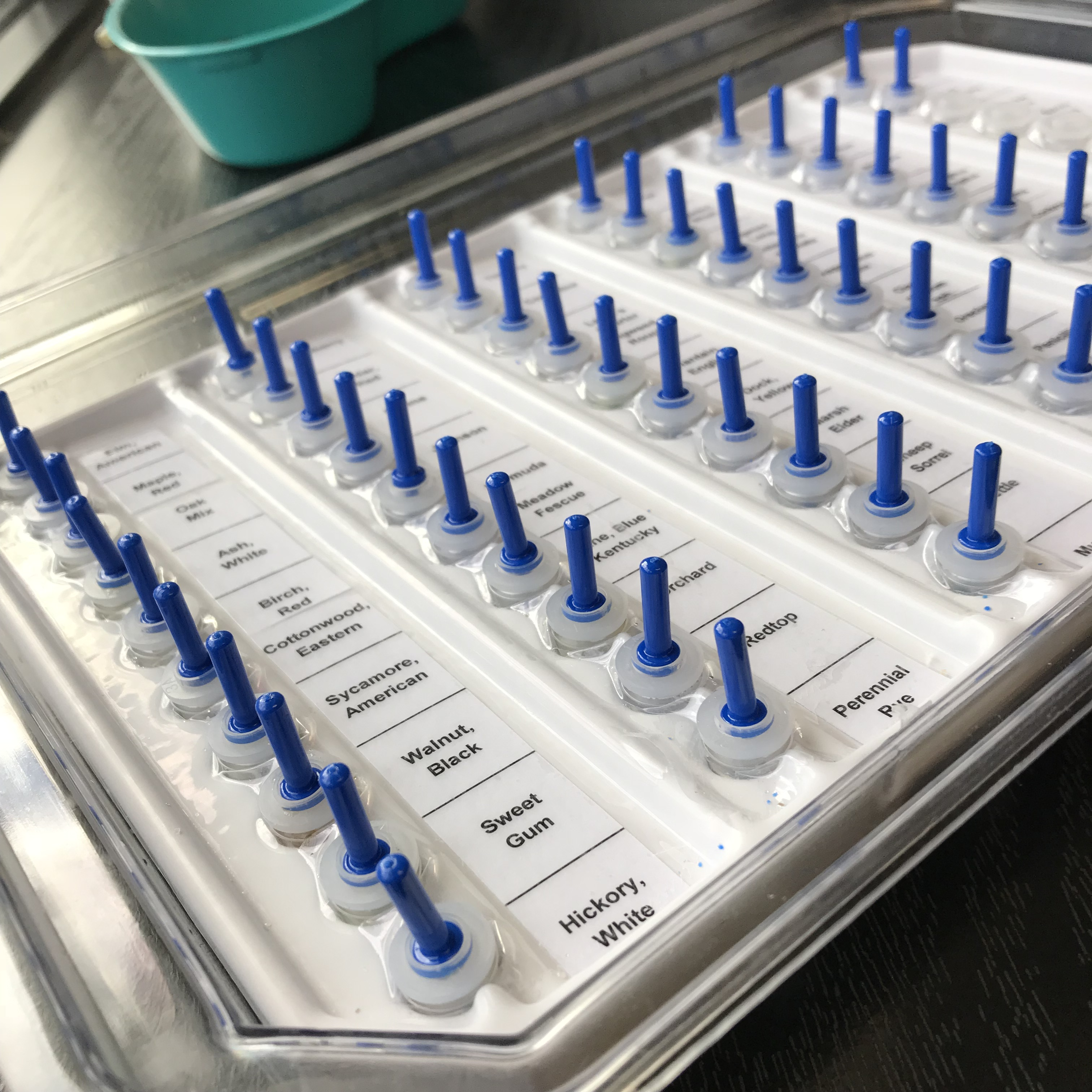
- An array of chemical allergens to be used in testing
- Synonyms: Skin prick test
- Purpose: Diagnosis of skin allergies

Skin allergy testing comprises a range of methods for medical diagnosis of allergies that attempts to provoke a small, controlled, allergic response.

== Methods ==
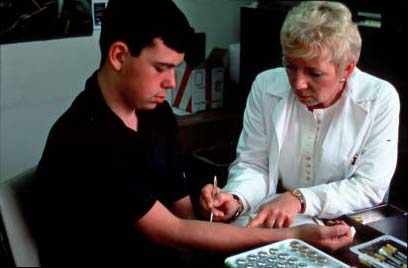
A person receiving a skin allergy test

A microscopic amount of an allergen is introduced to a patient's skin by various means:

- Skin prick test: pricking the skin with a needle or pin containing a small amount of the allergen.
- Skin scratch test: a deep dermic scratch is performed with help of the blunt bottom of a lancet.
- Intradermic test: a tiny quantity of allergen is injected under the dermis with a hypodermic syringe.
- Skin scrape Test: a superficial scrape is performed with help of the back of a needle to remove the superficial layer of the epidermis.
- Patch test: applying a patch to the skin, where the patch contains the allergen

If an immuno-response is seen in the form of a rash, urticaria (hives), or anaphylaxis it can be concluded that the patient has a hypersensitivity (or allergy) to that allergen. Further testing can be done to identify the particular allergen.

The "skin scratch test" as it is called, is not very commonly used due to the increased likelihood of infection. On the other hand, the "skin scrape test" is painless, does not leave residual pigmentation, and does not have a risk of infection, since it is limited to the superficial layer of the skin.

Some allergies are identified in a few minutes but others may take several days. In all cases where the test is positive, the skin will become raised, red, and appear itchy. The results are recorded - larger wheals indicating that the subject is more sensitive to that particular allergen. A negative test does not conclusively rule out an allergy; occasionally, the concentration needs to be adjusted, or the body fails to elicit a response.

=== Immediate reactions tests ===
Skin testing on arm

In the prick, scratch and scrape tests, a few drops of the purified allergen are gently pricked on to the skin surface, usually the forearm. This test is usually done in order to identify allergies to pet dander, dust, pollen, foods or dust mites. Intradermal injections are done by injecting a small amount of allergen just beneath the skin surface. The test is done to assess allergies to drugs like penicillin or bee venom.

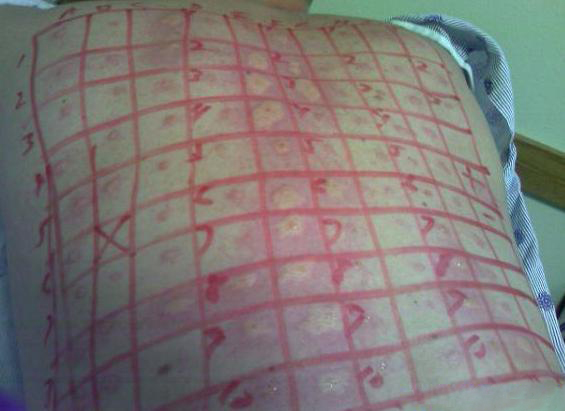
Skin testing on back

To ensure that the skin is reacting in the way it is supposed to, all skin allergy tests are also performed with proven allergens like histamine, and non-allergens like glycerin. The majority of people do react to histamine and do not react to glycerin. If the skin does not react appropriately to these allergens then it most likely will not react to the other allergens. These results are interpreted as falsely negative.

=== Delayed reactions tests ===
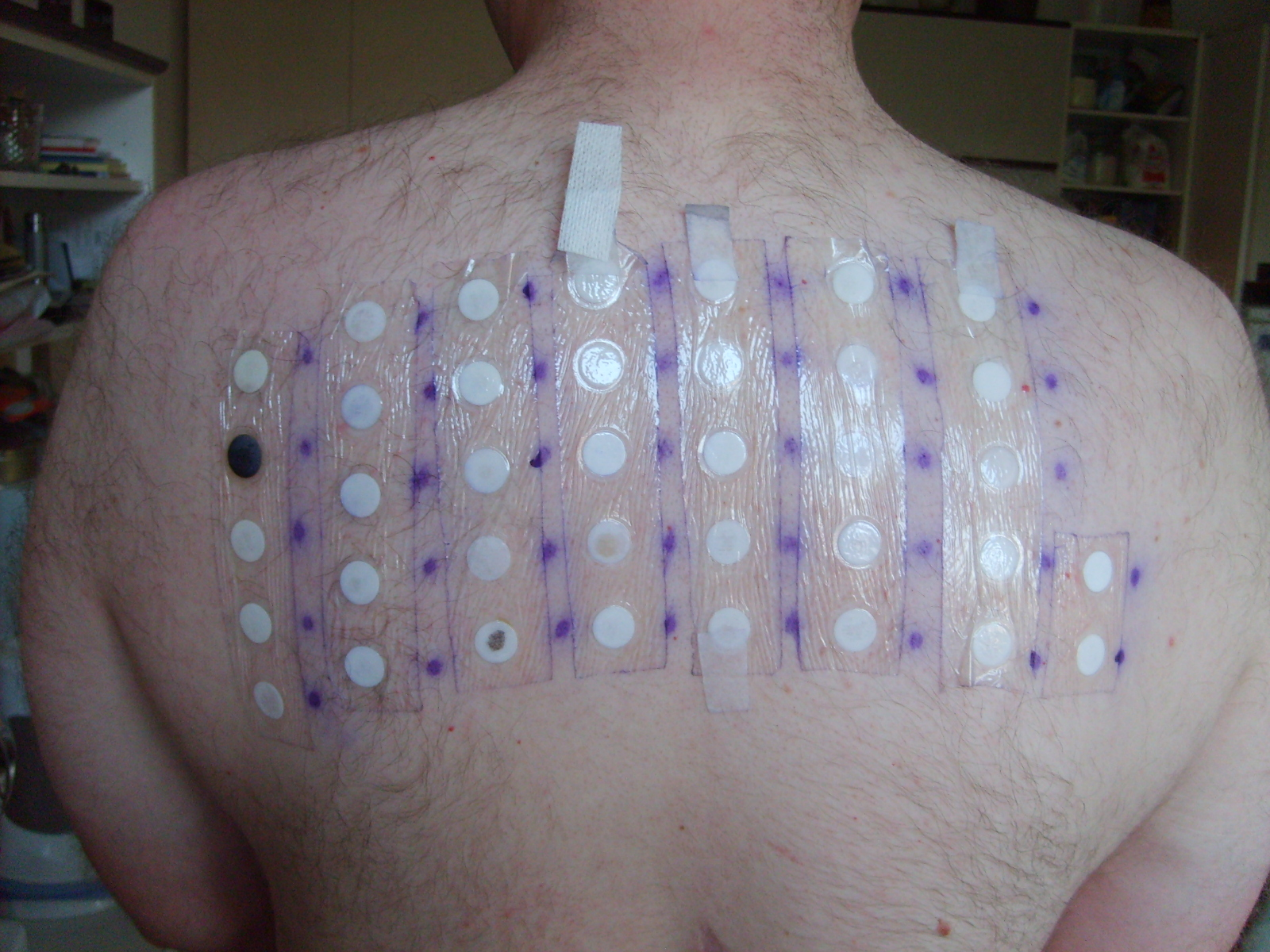
Patch test

The patch test uses rectangles of special hypoallergenic adhesive tape with different allergens on them. The patch is applied to the skin, usually on the back. The allergens on the patch include latex, medications, preservatives, hair dyes, fragrances, resins, and various metals. Patch testing is used to detect allergic contact dermatitis but does not test for hives or food allergy.

=== Skin end point titration ===
Intradermal test

Also called an intradermal test, this skin end point titration (SET) uses an intradermal injection of allergens at increasing concentrations to measure allergic response. To prevent a severe allergic reaction, the test is started with a very dilute solution. After 10 minutes, the injection site is measured to look for growth of wheal, a small swelling of the skin. Two millimeters of growth in 10 minutes is considered positive. If 2 mm of growth is noted, then a second injection at a higher concentration is given to confirm the response. The end point is the concentration of antigen that causes an increase in the size of the wheal followed by confirmatory whealing. If the wheal grows larger than 13 mm, then no further injections are given since this is considered a major reaction.

== Preparation ==
There are no major preparations required for skin testing. At the first consult, the subject's medical history is obtained and physical examination is performed. All patients should bring a list of their medications because some may interfere with the testing. Other medications may increase the chance of a severe allergic reaction. Medications that commonly interfere with skin testing include the following:

- Histamine antagonists like Allegra, Claritin, Benadryl, Zyrtec
- Antidepressants like Amitriptyline, Doxepin
- Antacid like Tagamet or Zantac

Patients who undergo skin testing should know that anaphylaxis can occur anytime. If any of the following symptoms are experienced, a physician consultation is recommended immediately:

- Low grade fever
- Lightheadedness or dizziness
- Wheezing or shortness of breath
- Extensive skin rash
- Swelling of face, lips or mouth
- Difficulty swallowing or speaking

== Contraindications ==
Even though skin testing may seem to be a benign procedure, it does have some risks, including swollen red bumps (hives) which may occur after the test. The hives usually disappear in a few hours after the test. In rare cases they can persist for a day or two. These hives may be itchy and are best treated by applying an over the counter hydrocortisone cream. In very rare cases one may develop a full blown allergic reaction. Physicians who perform skin test always have equipment and medications available in case an anaphylaxis reaction occurs. This is the main reason why people should not get skin testing performed at corner stores or by people who have no medical training.

Antihistamines, which are commonly used to treat allergy symptoms, interfere with skin tests, as they can prevent the skin from reacting to the allergens being tested. People who take an antihistamine need either to choose a different form of allergy test or to stop taking the antihistamine temporarily before the test. The period of time needed can range from a day or two to 10 days or longer, depending on the specific medication. Some medications not primarily used as antihistamines, including tricyclic antidepressants, phenothiazine-based antipsychotics, and several kinds of medications used for gastrointestinal disorders, can similarly interfere with skin tests.

People who have severe, generalized skin disease or an acute skin infection should not undergo skin testing, as one needs uninvolved skin for testing. Also, skin testing should be avoided for people at a heightened risk of anaphylactic shock, including people who are known to be highly sensitive to even the smallest amount of allergen.

Besides skin tests, there are blood tests which measure a specific antibody in the blood. The IgE antibody plays a vital role in allergies but its levels in blood do not always correlate with the allergic reaction.

There are many alternative health care practitioners who perform a variety of provocation neutralization tests, but the vast majority of these tests have no validity and have never been proven to work scientifically.

== See also ==
- RAST test
- Basophil activation
- Allergies
- Hypersensitivity
- Dermatitis
- Anaphylaxis
- Prausnitz-Küstner test
- Protein nitrogen unit
- List of allergies
