= Daniela M. Ferreira =

Brazilian immunologist

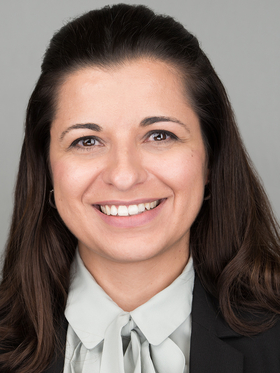
- Born: Daniela M. Ferreira
- Citizenship: Brazilian and British
- Education: University of São Paulo (SP); University of São Paulo (PhD)
- Known for: Research on Respiratory Infections and Covid-19 Vaccine trials
- Scientific career
- Fields: Respiratory tract infection, Vaccine and Immunology
- Institutions: University of Oxford; Liverpool School of Tropical Medicine; Butantan institute
- Thesis: DNA vaccines against Streptococcus pneumoniae based on PspA (Pneumococcal surface protein A) and PspC (Pneumococcal surface protein C) (2009)

Daniela M. Ferreira is a Brazilian British immunologist. She is a specialist in bacterial infection, respiratory co-infection, mucosal immunology and vaccine responses. She is currently Professor of Respiratory Infection and Vaccinology at the Oxford Vaccine Group in the Department of Paediatrics at the University of Oxford and the Director of the Liverpool Vaccine Group at the Liverpool School of Tropical Medicine. She leads a team of scientists studying protective immune responses against pneumococcus and other respiratory pathogens such as SARS-CoV2. Her team has established a novel method of inducing pneumococcal carriage in human volunteers. They use this model to:

- Discover how people with risk factors (age, chronic lung disease) make responses to respiratory bacteria and virus and how this is different from healthy people
- Pre-select vaccine candidates and test new vaccines more rapidly
- Discover how the host alters the biology of the bacteria while it is being carried

Her team has played a substantial role in the UK covid-19 pandemic response as a trial site for several COVID-19 vaccine studies including the Oxford / Astrazeneca vaccine.

Ferreira is part of the HIC-VAC consortium and Leads the WorkStream on Human Challenge Plataform to accelerate product development in the UKRI Infection Innovation Consortium (iiCON).

== Research and career ==
Ferreira obtained a Degree and Bachelor's Degree in Biological Sciences in 2005 and a Ph.D. in Immunology in 2009, both from the University of São Paulo (São Paulo, Brazil). During her PhD, Ferreira was awarded the Robert Austrian Research Award in Pneumococcal Vaccinology.

Ferreira joined the Respiratory Infection group at Liverpool School of Tropical Medicine as a postdoctoral fellow in December 2009 and together with Prof. Stephen Gordon led the development of an Experimental Human Pneumococcal Nasopharyngeal Colonization Model. Ferreira was appointed Professor and subsequent Head of Department of Clinical Sciences in 2018. Her main lines of research are:

- 1) Accelerate development and test novel pneumococcal vaccines using experimental carriage
- 2) Understanding nasal and lung immune responses and correlates of protection against respiratory infection with viruses including SARS-CoV2 and bacteria
- 3) Defining how respiratory virus co-infections (flu, RSV and SARS-CoV2) and host susceptibility (asthma, COPD, aging, smoke) alters responses to pneumococcal infection

=== Key Publications ===
- Adler, H; German, EL; Mitsi, E; Nikolaou, E; Pojar, S; Hales, C; Robinson, R; Connor, V; Hill, H; Hyder-Wright, AD; Lazarova, L; Lowe, C; Smith, EL; Wheeler, I; Zaidi, SR; Jochems, SP; Loukov, D; Reiné, J; Solórzano-Gonzalez, C; d'Argoeuves, P; Jones, T; Goldblatt, D; Chen, T; Aston, SJ; French, N; Collins, AM; Gordon, SB; Ferreira, DM; Rylance, J (2021). "Experimental Human Pneumococcal Colonization in Older Adults Is Feasible and Safe, Not Immunogenic". Am J Respir Crit Care Med. 203 (5): 604–613. doi:10.1164/rccm.202004-1483OC. PMC 7924584. PMID 32941735.
- Mitsi. E, Carniel.B, Reiné.J, Rylance.J, Zaidi. S, Soares-Schanos.A, Connor. V, Collins. A, Schlitzer. A, Nikolaou. E, SolorzanoGonzalez. C, Pojar. S, Hill. H, Hyder-Wright. A, Jambo. K, Oggioni. M. De Ste Croix, Megan, Gordon.S, Jochems.S, and Ferreira. DM. Nasal Pneumococcal Density is Associated with Microaspiration and Heightened Human Alveolar Macrophage Responsiveness to Bacterial Pathogens. Am J Respir Crit Care Med. Oct 2019.https://doi.org/10.1164/rccm.201903-0607OC.
- Jochems S, K.de Ruiter, C.Solórzano, A. Voskamp, E.Mitsi, E.Nikolaou, B.Carniel, S. Pojar, E.German, J. Reiné, A. Soares-Schanoski, H. Hill, R.Robinson, A. Hyder-Wright, C. M. Weight, P.F. Durrenberger, R.S. Heyderman, S. B. Gordon, H. H. Smits, B.C. Urban, J. Rylance, A.. Collins, M. D. Wilkie, L.Lazarova, S.C. Leong, M.Yazdanbakhsh, Ferreira DM. Innate and adaptive nasal mucosal immune responses following experimental human pneumococcal colonization, J Clin Invest. 2019, Oct;129(10):4523-4538.
- Steenhuijsen Piters WAA, Jochems S, Mitsi E, Rylance J, Pojar S, Nikolaou E, German EL, Holloway M, Carniel BF, Chu MLJN, Arp K,. Sanders EAM, Ferreira DM* and Bogaert D.* Interaction between live-attenuated influenza vaccine, Streptococcus pneumoniae and the nasal microbiota. Nat Commun. 10, 2981 (2019), https://doi.org/10.1038/s41467-019-10814-9.
- Ferreira, Jochems; SP (2018). "Inflammation induced by influenza virus impairs innate control of human pneumococcal carriage". Nature Immunology. 19 (12): 1299–1308. doi:10.1038/s41590-018-0231-y. PMC 6241853. PMID 30374129.
- Ferreira, Glennie; S (2019). "Two Randomized Trials of Effect of Live Attenuated Influenza Vaccine on Pneumococcal Colonization". Am J Respir Crit Care Med. 199 (9): 1160–1163. doi:10.1164/rccm.201811-2081LE. PMC 6515882. PMID 30758980.
- Pennington SH, Pojar S, Mitsi E, Gritzfeld JF, Nikolaou E, Solórzano C, Owugha JT, Masood Q, Gordon MA, Wright AD, Collins AM, Miyaji EN, Gordon SB, Ferreira DM. Polysaccharide-specific Memory B-cells Predict Protection Against Experimental Human Pneumococcal Carriage. Am J Respir Crit Care Med. 2016 Dec 15;194(12):1523-1531.
- E Mitsi, AM Roche, J Reiné, T Zangari, JT Owugha1, SH Pennington, JF Gritzfeld, AM Collins, S van Selm, MI de Jonge, SB Gordon, JN Weiser, DM Ferreira. Agglutination by anti-capsular polysaccharide antibody is associated with protection against experimental human pneumococcal carriage. Mucosal Immunol. 2016 Aug 31. doi: 10.1038/mi.2016.71.
- Glennie S, Gritzfeld JF, Pennington SH, Garner-Jones M, Coombes N, Hopkins MJ, Vadesilho CF, Miyaji EN, Wang D, Wright AD, Collins AM, Gordon SB, Ferreira DM. Modulation of nasopharyngeal innate defenses by viral coinfection predisposes individuals to experimental pneumococcal carriage. Mucosal Immunol. 2016 Jan;9(1):56-67. doi: 10.1038/mi.2015.35.
- Ferreira DM, Neill DR, Bangert M, Gritzfeld JF, Green N, Wright AK, Pennington SH, Moreno LB, Moreno AT, Miyaji EN, Wright AD, Collins AM, Goldblatt D, Kadioglu A, Gordon SB. Controlled Human Infection and Re-Challenge with Streptococcus Pneumoniae Reveals the Protective Efficacy of Carriage in Healthy Adults. Am J Respir Crit Care Med. 2013 Jan 31.
