= Jon van Rood =

Dutch immunologist

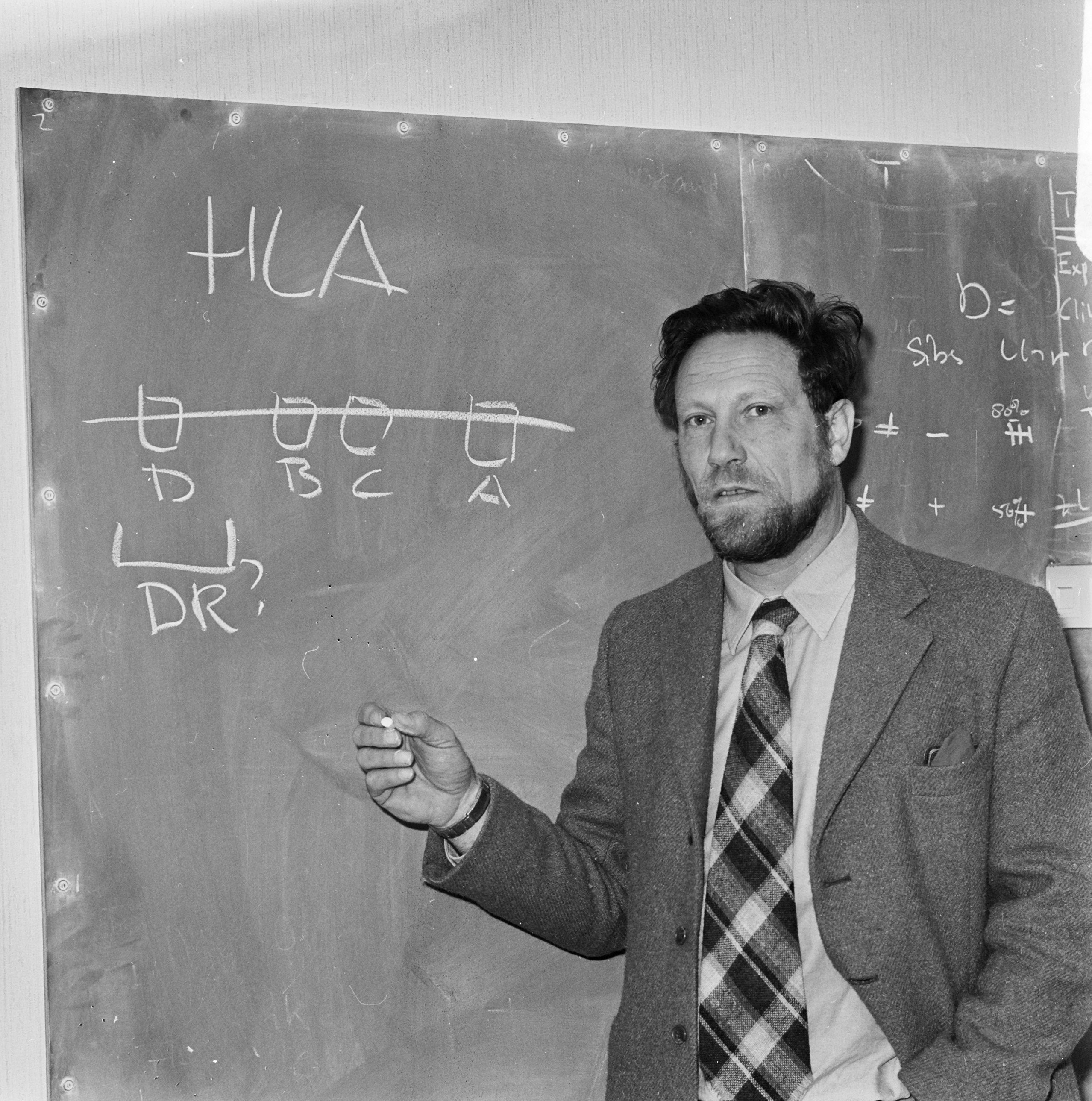
Jon van Rood (Robert Koch Prize, Dec. 1977

Johannes Joseph "Jon" van Rood (7 April 1926, Scheveningen – 21 July 2017) was a Dutch immunologist. He founded Eurotransplant in 1967, a non-profit organization responsible for encouraging and coordinating organ transplants.

== Awards ==
In 1977 van Rood was awarded the Robert Koch Prize. In 1978, he was awarded the Wolf Prize in Medicine, jointly with George D. Snell and Jean Dausset, "for his contribution to the understanding of the complexity of the HLA system in man and its implications in transplantation and in disease." Van Rood was elected a member of the Royal Netherlands Academy of Arts and Sciences in 1978. In 1989 he was awarded the Ernst Jung Prize for Medicine.

== Death ==
He died on 21 July 2017 in Leeuwarden.

== Publications (sel.) ==
- Johannes Joseph van Rood: Leucocyte grouping. Den Haag, 1962 (Dissertation Leiden University)
