= Basophil activation =

Allergic symptoms are caused by an initial systemic histamine release by activated basophils and mast cells, that may lead to shock with laryngeal edema, lower-airway obstruction and hypotension. This is why basophils are considered with mast cells to be the key cells in allergic diseases.

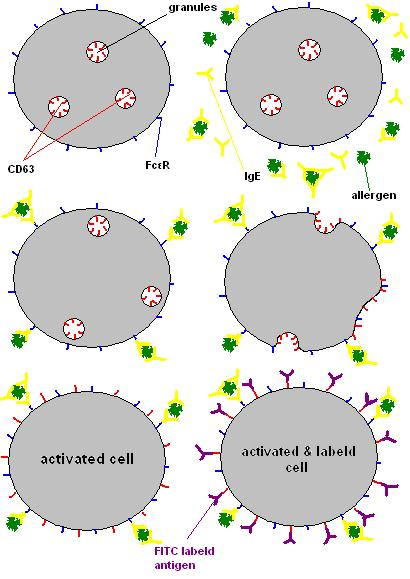
basophil activation and labeling

== Activation process ==
Immunoglobulin E (IgE) is a class of antibody (or immunoglobulin "isotype") that has only been found in mammals. It plays an important role in allergy, and is especially associated with type 1 hypersensitivity. There are receptors (FcεR) for the constant region of IgE, the Fc region, on several types of cells, including Mast cells and Basophils. Basophils contain many granules inside the cell, which are filled with a variety of active substance triggering an allergic response upon degranulation. The cells are activated and start degranulation when the IgE antibody, bound to an allergen which can bind to the specific variable region of the IgE, the Fab region, bind to the Fc receptor

== In vitro allergy test method ==
In most cases, a positive skin test is used in identification of allergies, but the activation of basophilic granulocytes with anti-IgE, the expression of the CD63 antigen on the cell surface (plasma membrane) allows identification of the allergen responsible for the hypersensitivity reaction without performing the common scratch test. Only a little amount of blood is needed for this experiment, which makes it comfortable to use since one can perform it in parallel to a normal blood checkup. It can be used for different allergies (e.g. bee venom, drugs, contrast media).

=== Degranulation ===
Degranulated cell expose CD63 molecules on their outer cell membrane, hence the granules, which contain CD63 molecules on their inner surface, merged with the cell membrane. The inner cell surface of the granules becomes the outer cell surface of the basophil /mast cell during degranulation process.

materials	purpose
BSB	basophil stimulation
IL-3	basophil stimulation
allergen	
EDTA	degranulation stopper
marker	marks the basophils
lyse solution	lyses red blood cells
centrifuge	spin down red blood cells
PBS	washing away lyse solution
FACS	counting cells

=== Labeling and sorting ===
As flow cytometry is a valuable tool for analyzing large numbers of cells and for identifying cell populations, even at low concentrations, the percentage of basophils activated after in vitro stimulation by allergens and expressing the CD63 marker can be determined. The CD63 marker is a fluorescein isothiocyanate labeled antigen which can bind to an CD63 protein and is used to sort the cells via FACS(Fluorescence activated cell sorting/sorter). This FITC labeled antigen emits light at a wavelength of 530 nm. As the emitted fluorescence intensity is proportional to the binding sites of each single cell, the intensity will increase according to the number of FITC- conjugated antibodies bound to CD63 expressing cells.

=== Procedure ===
A test tube is prepared with basophil stimulation buffer (BSB) including Interleukin 3 and an allergen which is to be tested. The blood sample is added and the tube is incubated at 37 °C for several minutes, to ensure that the allergens can bind to the IgE. By adding EDTA to the test tube, the degranulation process is stopped immediately. After degranulation a CD63 marker (labeled antibodies) is added to the test tube. Several minutes at room temperature gives the marker time to bind to the CD63 proteins on the cell membrane of the basophil. A lysing step is performed to lyse the red blood cells. Because they outnumber by far the leucocytes they need to be removed to do a FACS analysis of the basophils.

== See also ==
- Innate immune system
- Allergy
- B cell
- Fc receptor
