= Eurotransplant =

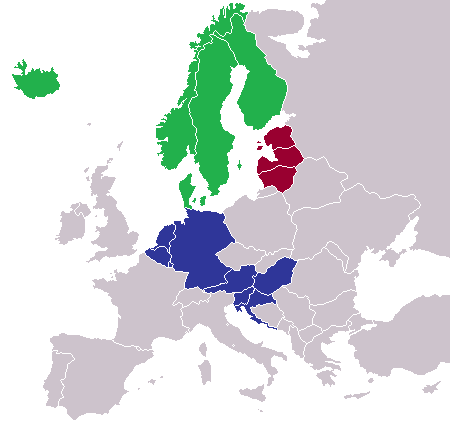

The Eurotransplant International Foundation, commonly known simply as Eurotransplant, is an international non-profit organization responsible for encouraging and coordinating organ transplants in Austria, Belgium, Croatia, Germany, Hungary, Luxembourg, the Netherlands, and Slovenia. The headquarters are located in Leiden, Netherlands. The organization was created by Jon J. van Rood in 1967.

== History ==
Eurotransplant
- Founded: 1967
- Founder: Jon J. van Rood

Eurotransplant was founded by Jon J. van Rood of the Netherlands in 1967 on the basis that matching human leukocyte antigen types between organ donors and recipients improved survival in organ transplants, requiring a large network of possible patients from a central organisation. Initially, the Eurotransplant network comprised twelve transplant centres (hospitals) in three countries that provided details of the transplant candidates on their waiting lists so that, when donor organs became available, the best match could be selected from a larger pool. Within several years, six countries were involved with 68 transplant centres: Austria, Belgium, Luxembourg, Germany, the Netherlands, and Switzerland. Switzerland later withdrew and Slovenia (1999), Croatia (2007) and Hungary (2013) later joined. Eurotransplant initially focused on kidney transplantation but later expanded to liver, heart, pancreas, lung, and intestine transplantation.

By 1999, around 70,000 transplantations had been performed through the Eurotransplant network; by 2012, the number was more than 125,000. In 2023, 6,815 organs were transplanted through the Eurotransplant network, nearly half of which were kidneys.

== Organisation ==
All transplant clinics, tissue-typing laboratories, and hospitals in the member countries where organ donations take place are included in the exchange. There is a democratic structure wherein each national transplant society selects members of a central advisory committee.
