= Otto Prausnitz =

Otto Carl Willy Prausnitz (October 11, 1876 in Hamburg – April 21, 1963), also known as Carl Prausnitz-Giles, was a German physician, bacteriologist, and hygienist who developed the Prausnitz–Küstner test with Heinz Küstner.

== Education and career ==
Prausnitz was a student of Richard Pfeiffer, and is considered a pioneer of bacteriology and immunology. Prausnitz was born in Hamburg, Germany on October 11, 1876. He was the son of Otto Prausnitz, a German physician, and an English mother whose maiden name was Giles. Prausnitz studied at the Universities of Leipzig, Kiel, and Breslau, and mainly worked on differentiating Vibrio cholerae from other Vibrio species. He earned his M.D. from the University of Breslau in 1903. He also studied hay fever and the allergenic nature of pollen. Prausnitz moved to London in 1905, and became an instructor at the Royal Institute of Public Health.
