= James S. Tan =

American doctor

- Born: August 3, 1938; Manila, Philippines
- Died: May 25, 2006 (aged 67); Akron, Ohio, United States of America
- Organization: Summa Health System

James S. Tan (died May 25, 2006) was an American physician who specialized in infectious diseases, immunology, and internal medicine. He was the author of several medical books and many medical articles.

Tan was affiliated with Summa Health System.

His books include Microbiology and Immunology (Mosby 2002), and the Rapid Response medical-student review for it (Mosby 2006, 2nd ed.). Tan was also the author of Contemporary Diagnosis and Management of Skin and Soft Tissue Infections (with Thomas M. File); Expert Guide to Infectious Diseases (part of the American College of Physicians-American Society of Internal Medicine's "Expert Guides Series"); and is co-author Pocket Guide to Injectable Drugs: Companion to Handbook on Injectable Drugs (American College of Cardiology, 11th ed. 2001).

Tan died of cancer at age 67. He has nine living relatives; his wife, June; daughters, Rowena and Stephanie; son, Michael; and grandchildren, Drew, Allison, Hannah, Jameson, and Nicholas.
