= Variolation =

Former method of smallpox immunisation

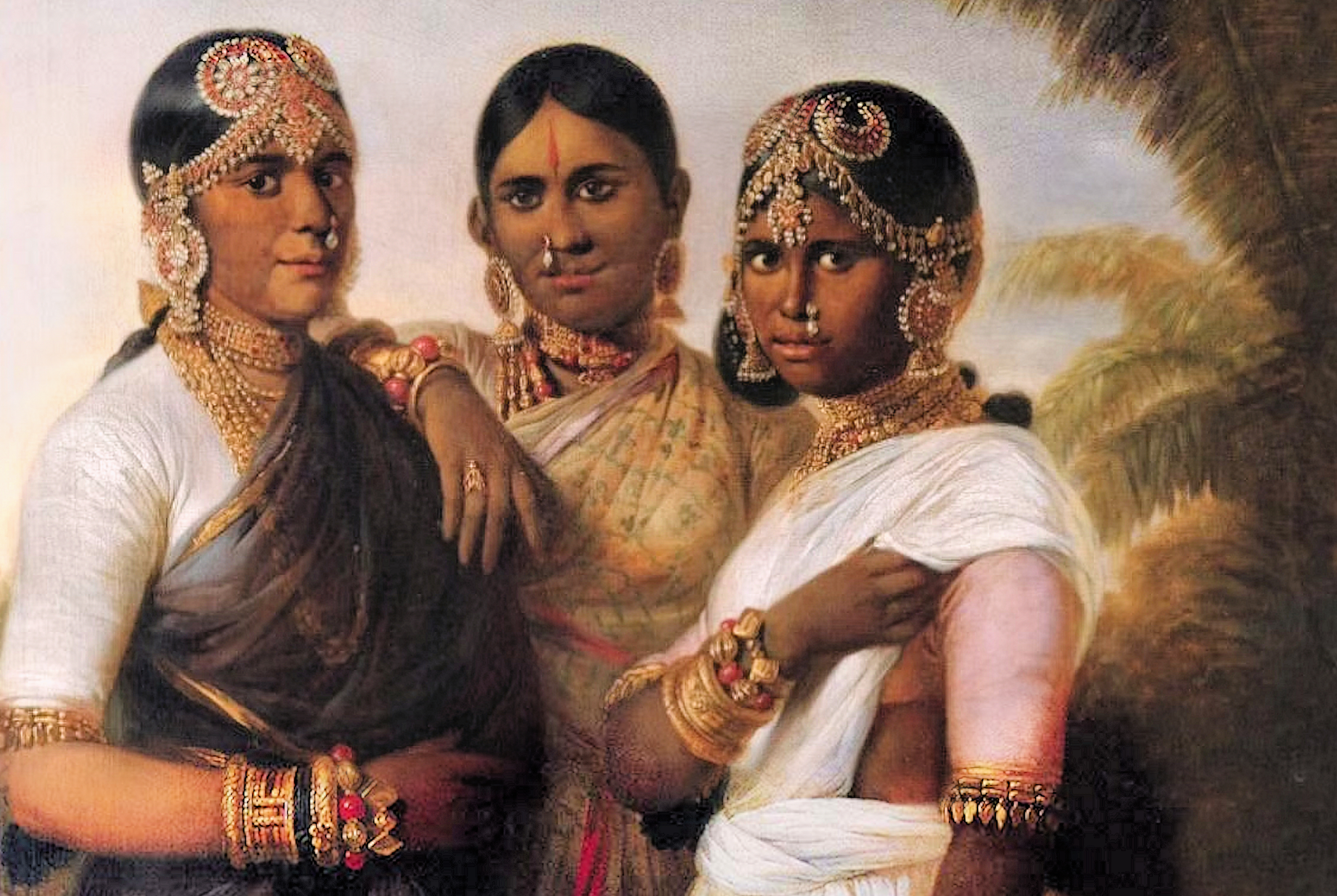
"Queens" of Mysore: left, Krishnaraja Wadiyar III's first wife, Devajammani has a discoloration around the mouth, thought to be due to the blowing of variolation dust in the nose ("nasal insufflation"). Right, his second wife shows the discrete mark left by vaccination under her saree. Thomas Hickey, 1805.

Variolation was the method of inoculation first used to immunize individuals against smallpox (Variola) with material taken from a patient or a recently variolated individual, in the hope that a mild, but protective, infection would result. Only 1–2% of those variolated died from the intentional infection compared to 30% who contracted smallpox naturally. Variolation is no longer used today. It was replaced by the smallpox vaccine, a safer alternative. This in turn led to the development of the many vaccines now available against other diseases.

The procedure was most commonly carried out by inserting/rubbing powdered smallpox scabs or fluid from pustules into superficial scratches made in the skin. The virus was normally spread through the air, infecting first the mouth, nose, or respiratory tract, before spreading throughout the body via the lymphatic system. In contrast, infection of the skin usually led to a milder, localized infection, but, crucially, still induced immunity to the virus. The patient would develop pustules like those caused by naturally acquired smallpox. Eventually, after about two to four weeks, these symptoms would subside, indicating successful recovery and immunity.

The method was first used in China, India, parts of Africa and the Middle East before it was introduced into England and North America in the 1720s in the face of some opposition. However, inoculation had been reported in Wales since the early 17th century.

== Terminology ==
The terminology used to describe the prevention of smallpox can cause confusion. In 18th-century medical terminology, inoculation refers to smallpox inoculation. Confusion is caused by writers who interchange variolation and vaccination through either mistranslation or misinterpretation. The term variolation refers solely to inoculation with smallpox virus and is related to but not interchangeable with vaccination. The latter term was first used in 1800 soon after Edward Jenner introduced smallpox vaccine derived from cowpox, an animal disease distinct from smallpox. The term variolation was then used from the 19th century to avoid confusion with vaccination. Most modern writers tend to refer to smallpox inoculation as variolation throughout without regard for chronology, as is used here. Further confusion was caused when, in 1891, Louis Pasteur honoured Jenner by widening the terms vaccine/vaccination to refer to the artificial induction of immunity against any infectious disease. Inoculation refers to intentionally exposing an individual to a virus, bacterium, other pathogen, or artificial vaccine that may induce active immunity, and inoculation can be done by any suitable route of administration. Many familiar vaccines are injected intramuscularly or swallowed.

The term "inoculation" entered medical English through horticultural usage meaning to graft a bud (or eye) from one plant into another. It is derived from the Latin in + oculus (eye).

== Origins ==
=== China ===
The Chinese practiced the oldest documented use of variolation, dating back to the 16th century, and according to some sources the 11th century. They implemented a method of "nasal insufflation" administered by blowing powdered smallpox material, usually scabs, up the nostrils. Various insufflation techniques have been recorded throughout the 16th and 17th centuries within China, most notably by Wan Quan. British sinologist Joseph Needham gives a date of the first variolation being dated to between 1567 and 1572. According to such documentation, mild smallpox cases were selected as donors in order to prevent serious attack. The technique used scabs that had been left to dry out for some time. Fresh scabs were more likely to lead to a full-blown infection. Three or four scabs were ground into powder or mixed with a grain of musk and bound in cotton. Infected material was then packed into a pipe and puffed up the patient's nostril. The practice of variolation is believed to have been ritualized by the Chinese. The blowpipe used during the procedure was made of silver. The right nostril was used for boys and the left for girls. Variolated cases were treated as if they were as infectious as those who had acquired the disease naturally. These patients were subsequently kept apart from others until the rash had cleared.

In the 18th century, two schools of inoculation developed. The Sung-chiang school used scabs from patients of only the mildest cases, while the Hu-chou school did not; the imperial editors of the Yuzuan yizong jinjian tended to favor the latter school. The practice of using scabs from epidemic patients was seen as beneficial by some, but others were convinced of its danger; the Kangxi Emperor approved of it and inoculated both his children and his regular troops. Two reports on the Chinese practice were received by the Royal Society in London in 1700; one by Dr. Martin Lister who received a report by an employee of the East India Company stationed in China, and another by the physician Clopton Havers, but no action was taken.

=== India ===
India has been suggested as possible origin. There are two accounts from the 18th century of inoculations being performed by itinerant Brahmins: Oliver Coult wrote in 1731 that it had been "first performed by Dununtary a physician of Champanagar" about 150 years before that time (Dhanvantari being the name of the Hindu God of medicine, and a common name among physicians). In 1768, John Zephaniah Holwell wrote of its being practiced for many hundreds of years. Aspects of these accounts have been called into question, but by 1768, inoculation was reportedly being practiced in Bengal. A 1768 letter written by Reverend Mr. Chais (originally in Dutch), described that variolation had been practiced in the Bengal province "for a very long time". The letter describes two methods of variolation: one in which dried scabs from the previous year are rubbed into small pricks made by a needle in the arm, and another in which the dried scabs are mixed with sugar and swallowed by the patient with a sweet and pleasant liquid. The doctors who performed this procedure were known as Tikadars. The term tika is still in use now to mean 'vaccination' in many Indian languages. Holwell ascribes this account to his Brahman informants. However, such a theory has not yet been discovered in any Sanskrit or vernacular treatise. Several historians have suggested that variolation may be older than the 18th century in India. However, these reports have been disputed. The original ancient text describing this method has not been found. There is no evidence in these that variolation was practiced. A 2012 paper argued that "since the claim that it was an ancient practice in India has been rejected, there is no reason to assume that it began there". The idea that inoculation originated in India has also been taken into account, although there is little evidence in ancient Sanskrit medical texts clearly describing the practice. The rumor that vaccination was documented in India before the discoveries of Edward Jenner, widespread since the nineteenth century, can be traced to propaganda tracts written in Sanskrit and the Indian vernaculars by colonial officers, designed to convince pious Indians to accept the newly discovered Jennerian procedure and abandon older variolation practices.

=== Sudan ===
Similar methods were seen through the Middle East and Africa. Two similar methods were described in Sudan during the late eighteenth and early nineteenth centuries. Both had been long established and stemmed from Arabic practices. Tishteree el Jidderi ('buying the smallpox') was a practice seen within the women of Sennar in central Sudan. A mother of an unprotected child would visit the house of a newly infected child and tie a cotton cloth around the ailing child's arm. She would then haggle with the child's mother over the cost of each pustule. When a bargain was struck, the woman would return home and tie the cloth around her own child's arm. Variations of this practice included bringing gifts to the donor. The second method was known as Dak el Jedri ('hitting the smallpox'), a method similar to that used in the Ottoman Empire and eventually transported into England. Fluid was collected from a smallpox pustule and rubbed into a cut made into the patient's skin. This practice spread more widely through Africa. It may have also traveled with merchants and pilgrims along the middle-eastern caravan routes into Turkey and Greece.

== Western Europe ==
Variolation in West Europe is first evidenced at the Schola Medica Salernitana in Post-Byzantine or early Norman Italy, where the insertion of infected pustules into the veins of infants is mentioned in the Regimen Sanitatis Salernitanum, which is dated either to before 1050 or to the 12th-13th centuries. The Letters from physicians in Wales published in 1722 indicated the local use of variolation from as early as 1600 near the Welsh port of Haverfordwest. Another reference to variolation is by Thomas Bartholin in 1675.

After coming across the practice in Constantinople, the physician Emmanuel Timoni wrote a letter describing the method in detail, which was later published in the Philosophical Transactions in 1714 and read to the Royal Society. The report caught the attention of a Bostonian minister, Cotton Mather, who mentions an encounter in 1707 with a Garamante from Libya named Onesimus. Mather said that Onesimus's society already had a practice of an operation that would have "given him something of the smallpox and would forever preserve him from it". Benjamin Colman, also a minister, mentions inoculation practices from Africa. In the same period, Lady Mary Montagu, the wife of a British diplomat to the Ottoman Empire, said variolation was widely practiced in the Ottoman Empire.

=== Lady Montagu ===
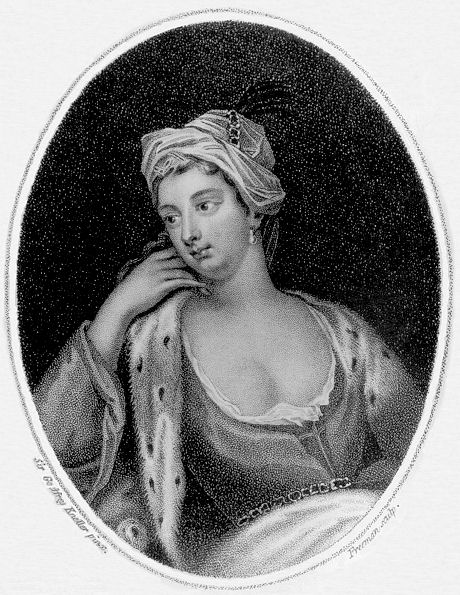
Engraving of Lady Mary Wortley Montagu by Samuel Freeman, after a portrait by Sir Godfrey Kneller

Lady Mary Wortley Montagu had lost her brother to smallpox in 1713. In 1715, she contracted the disease herself. Although she survived, she was left with severe facial scarring. While in the Ottoman Empire she came across the process of variolation as it was introduced and published in Constantinople by two Greek doctors, Emmanuel Timoni and Iacob Pylarino. She first mentioned variolation in the famous letter to her friend, Sarah Chiswell, in April 1717, in which she enthusiastically recounted the process, which in Constantinople was most commonly administered by experienced elderly women. In 1718, she had the procedure conducted on her five-year-old son, Edward Montagu. The procedure was supervised by the embassy doctor Charles Maitland. On her return to England, she had her four-year-old daughter variolated in the presence of physicians of the Royal Court in 1721. Both variolations proved successful. Later on that year Maitland conducted an experimental variolation of six prisoners in Newgate Prison in London. In the experiment, six condemned prisoners were variolated and later exposed to smallpox with the promise of freedom if they survived. The experiment was a success, and soon variolation was drawing attention from the royal family, who helped promote the procedure throughout England. However, variolation caused the death of Prince Octavius of Great Britain, eighth son and thirteenth child of King George III in 1783.

Despite opposition, variolation established itself as a mainstream medical treatment in England. Part of its success was founded on statistical observation, which confirmed that variolation was a safer alternative to contracting smallpox naturally, strengthened by the assumption that it protected against the disease for life. The major faults of variolation lay in its simplicity. Doctors sought to monopolize the simple treatment by convincing the public that the procedure could only be done by a trained professional. The procedure was now preceded by a severe bloodletting, in which the patient was bled, often to faintness, in order to 'purify' the blood and prevent fever. Doctors also began to favour deep incisions, which also discouraged amateurs.

=== The Suttonian Method ===
The main proponents of the English variolation movement were the Suttons, a family of physicians who would revolutionize the practice. The patriarch, Robert Sutton, was a surgeon from Suffolk. In 1757, the procedure failed on one of his sons. He sought a new method in which the procedure would become as mild as possible. By 1762 he began advertising "A New Method of Inoculating for Small-Pox." Sutton kept his method a secret and shared it only with his three sons. The mystique and effectiveness behind this new method helped to promote their business, which soon became very successful. They established a network of variolation houses and clinics and offered franchises to other variolators for a share of the profits, on condition that the secret would not be revealed. By 1770, the Suttons had treated over 300,000 satisfied customers. Daniel, the eldest of the Sutton sons, eventually revealed the family secret in his book The Inoculator, published in 1796. The success of their method lay in a shallow scratch, careful selection of only mildly affected donors, and no bleeding or extreme purging. Although the renown of the Suttons gradually faded after this revelation, the family's lasting impression would remain for generations.

Thomas Nettleton (1683–1748) was a precursor of the Suttons around 1722.

Other prominent English variolators included Thomas Dimsdale, who published accounts of his method in 1769 and 1781; William Woodville, appointed Director of the London Smallpox and Inoculation Hospital in 1791, who published a history of variolation in 1796; and John Haygarth, who published an ambitious plan to exterminate smallpox in 1783. Francois Dezoteux learnt the technique in England, then took it to France.

=== Johnnie Notions ===
John Williamson, more commonly known by the nickname Johnnie Notions, was a self-taught physician from Shetland, Scotland, who independently developed and successfully administered a variolation for smallpox to thousands of patients in Shetland during the late 18th century. Despite having only an elementary education and no formal medical background, the effectiveness of the treatment he devised yielded an extremely high success rate, resulting in the immunisation of approximately 3,000 people and the saving of many lives, which had a significant effect on the demographics of the Shetland population at the time. He is reputed to have not lost a single patient.

Notions would first collect smallpox pus. He would then dry it using peat smoke (which was believed to lessen the virus's virulence), and bury it in the ground with camphor (which has anti-bacterial properties, preventing the matter from decomposing). Oral history indicates the matter was spread between sheets of glass before burial. It would be kept in this state for up to seven or eight years to reduce its virulence before being administered to a patient. By using a knife (which Notions made himself) he would incise into the patient's arm intradermally (without drawing blood), insert a small amount of the matter, and immediately cover the incision with the patient's skin, before using a cabbage leaf as a plaster. In contrast to contemporaneous quack doctors, Notions would not stipulate any particular resting conditions (such as "hot-treatment" – heating the ill patient in front of a fire, covering them with blankets and allowing them no fresh-air), nor would he administer any other medicines during the period of infection and recovery.

Notions' variolation bears a strong similarity to the Suttonian method. How Notions became aware of this method of variolation is unclear – it may have been through written account, or through discussion with someone else aware of the technique, such as another physician or a member of the clergy.

=== Widespread recognition ===
In 1738, variolation was added to the second edition of Chambers' Cyclopædia, which in its time was an authority of knowledge for the literary class. Later in 1754, variolation received the sanction of the Royal College of Physicians. All of this made England the international center of variolation, attracting visitors from all over the world to explore this "new" method of prevention. The nation also acted as a magnet for those who sought to introduce the benefits of variolation to their own countries. A remarkable example of this is the introduction of variolation into Russia. Thomas Dimsdale, a prominent banker, politician, and physician, was invited to visit St Petersburg to variolate Catherine the Great. In 1769, he variolated Catherine, her 14-year-old son Grand Duke Paul, and over 140 prominent members of the Court. The results were successful. Dimsdale was created a baron of the Russian Empire, and awarded £10,000, with £2000 for expenses and an annuity of £500. His son, who accompanied him, was also rewarded. In case Dimsdale's variolations had ended badly, Catherine had arranged a relay of horses to carry them safely out of the country.

France was the last European country to embrace variolation. It was not until an outbreak of smallpox in Paris in 1752 nearly killed the heir to the French throne that the public embraced the practice after seeing the prince variolated. Similarly in Japan, Chinese merchant Li Jen-Shan proposed the method of traditional Chinese intranasal variolation after a severe smallpox outbreak in Nagasaki in 1744. This led Japanese physician Ogata Shunsaku to variolate children using a human smallpox vaccination method during an outbreak in Chikuzen Province from 1789 to 1790. There were no deaths among the children, and they all appeared to be protected.

By the end of the eighteenth century, variolation had gained widespread global respect and was thought to be one of the greatest medical successes of its time. It had become the subject of serious medical study, leading physicians like John Haygarth from Chester, England, to explore its application on a larger scale. In 1793 he published A Sketch of a Plan to Exterminate the Small-Pox from Great Britain. This relied on rules summarised by Donald Hopkins;

Systematic inoculation throughout the country, isolation of patients, decontamination of potentially contaminated fomites, supervised inspectors responsible for specific districts, rewards for observation of rules for isolation by poor persons, fines for transgression of those rules, inspection of vessels at ports, and prayers every Sunday.

Its implementation at the time was impractical for logistical reasons and the risk that variolation would spread smallpox. However, with suitable modifications, such as the substitution of vaccination for variolation, it was remarkably similar to the strategy adopted during the World Health Organization's smallpox eradication campaign.

== Spread into America ==
Documentation of variolation in the Americas may be traced back to 1706 in Boston, where Puritan minister Cotton Mather learned of the technique from his West African slave Onesimus. Further research into the matter revealed to Mather that several other slaves had too been variolated. In 1714, he came across Timoni's article in Philosophical Transactions, in which he described methods of variolation found in Turkey. Mather was able to implement this new method in 1721 when Boston suffered a smallpox outbreak, although others such as William Douglass strongly opposed the idea.

The main arguments against variolation were on religious grounds. Because religion was never far from any aspect of life in eighteenth-century Boston, several wondered how this new method would coincide with religious teachings. The simplest debate argued that variolation was ungodly because it was not mentioned specifically in the Bible. Inoculation was also viewed by some as a direct affront to God's innate right to determine who was to die, and how and when death would occur. Several believed smallpox outbreaks were well-merited punishments for the sins of those who contracted the disease. Those who were empirically minded saw the notion of using the products of such a deadly disease to prevent said disease as being an insult to logic.

Despite these persistent arguments, Mather also gained several supporters. Among this group of followers was surgeon Zabdiel Boylston, who urged Mather to further promote the procedure. With the support of Mather, Boylston went on to successfully variolate 300 patients, with only six of them dying. By contrast, 1,000 of the 6,000 people who acquired smallpox naturally died during the same period. Boylston traveled to London in 1724. There he published his results and was elected to the Royal Society in 1726.

From Boston, the practice spread throughout the colonies. In 1775, George Washington ordered that the Continental Army be variolated. By the end of the American Revolutionary War, variolation had gained widespread acceptance in the larger cities and towns of the United States.

== Transition into vaccination ==
The success of variolation led many, including medical professionals, to overlook its drawbacks. Variolation was practiced on the basis that it protected against smallpox for life, and was far less likely to kill than natural infection. In some cases however, natural smallpox or variolation failed to protect from a second attack. These cases were a result of a lapse of immune "memory", while others may have been misdiagnosed (experts often confused smallpox with chickenpox). Variolation also required a level of skill and attention to detail which some physicians lacked. Many physicians failed to take note of local redness and discharge to assure the variolation had taken, resulting in inadequate treatment. However, it was its great risk to others that led to the end of the practice. The collateral smallpox cases spread by variolated subjects shortly after variolation began to outweigh the benefits of the procedure.

From the 1760s, a number of individuals, including John Fewster, Peter Plett, Benjamin Jesty, and particularly Edward Jenner, were interested in the use of material from cowpox, an animal infection, to protect against smallpox. In 1796, Jenner vaccinated 8-years-old James Phipps, the first person to be given the experimental treatment. Jenner then did more vaccinations in 1798, and was the first to publish evidence that cowpox protected against smallpox, was safer than variolation, and that his vaccine could be maintained by arm-to-arm transfer. The use of variolation soon began to decline as the smallpox vaccine became widely used and its benefits appreciated. Various countries made variolation illegal, starting with Russia in 1805.

Variolation served as a natural precursor to the discovery of vaccination. The major differences between the two were that in vaccination, material from cowpox, an animal disease, was used, but particularly that it was far safer to those vaccinated and was far more rarely transmitted to their contacts. Vaccination offered the public a less-harmful method of preventing smallpox. Vaccination would revolutionize the control of smallpox, leading to its eventual eradication. The extension of the principle of vaccination by Pasteur and his successors would lead to the development of vaccines for diseases such as diphtheria, measles, mumps, rubella, and influenza, and make the eradication of infectious diseases, particularly poliomyelitis, a realistic prospect.

== Decline ==
Although variolation eventually declined or was banned in some countries, it was still practiced in others. "Buying the smallpox" was still practiced in Sudan until the late nineteenth century. However, variolation survived longer elsewhere. During the World Health Organization's Smallpox Eradication Campaign, vaccination teams came across variolators in remote areas of Pakistan and Afghanistan and their samples were confiscated. In the early stages of the campaign, live virus was detected in some, but as the campaign progressed variolators could not replenish their stocks, and although virus particles were detected in some samples, very few contained live virus. Our knowledge about the survival of smallpox virus suggests that passage of time makes it extremely unlikely that any infectious samples have survived.

== Other diseases ==
Although variolation has ceased, it has influenced the concept of other traditional practices, such as "pox parties", in which children are intentionally exposed to diseases like chickenpox, measles and rubella, in an attempt to gain immunity. Although strongly discouraged by public health officials, the practice persists.

While intentional exposure has been rejected as a strategy to combat COVID-19 because of the risks involved, there is also a hypothesis that widespread to universal use of face coverings is associated with a higher proportion of asymptomatic or relatively mild infections because of the decreased dose of viral particles expelled or received by the wearer, as a welcome addition to their primary purpose of significantly reducing transmission by asymptomatic wearers.

== See also ==
- Feedback (pork industry)
