= Mario Rosemblatt =

Mario Rosemblatt Silber
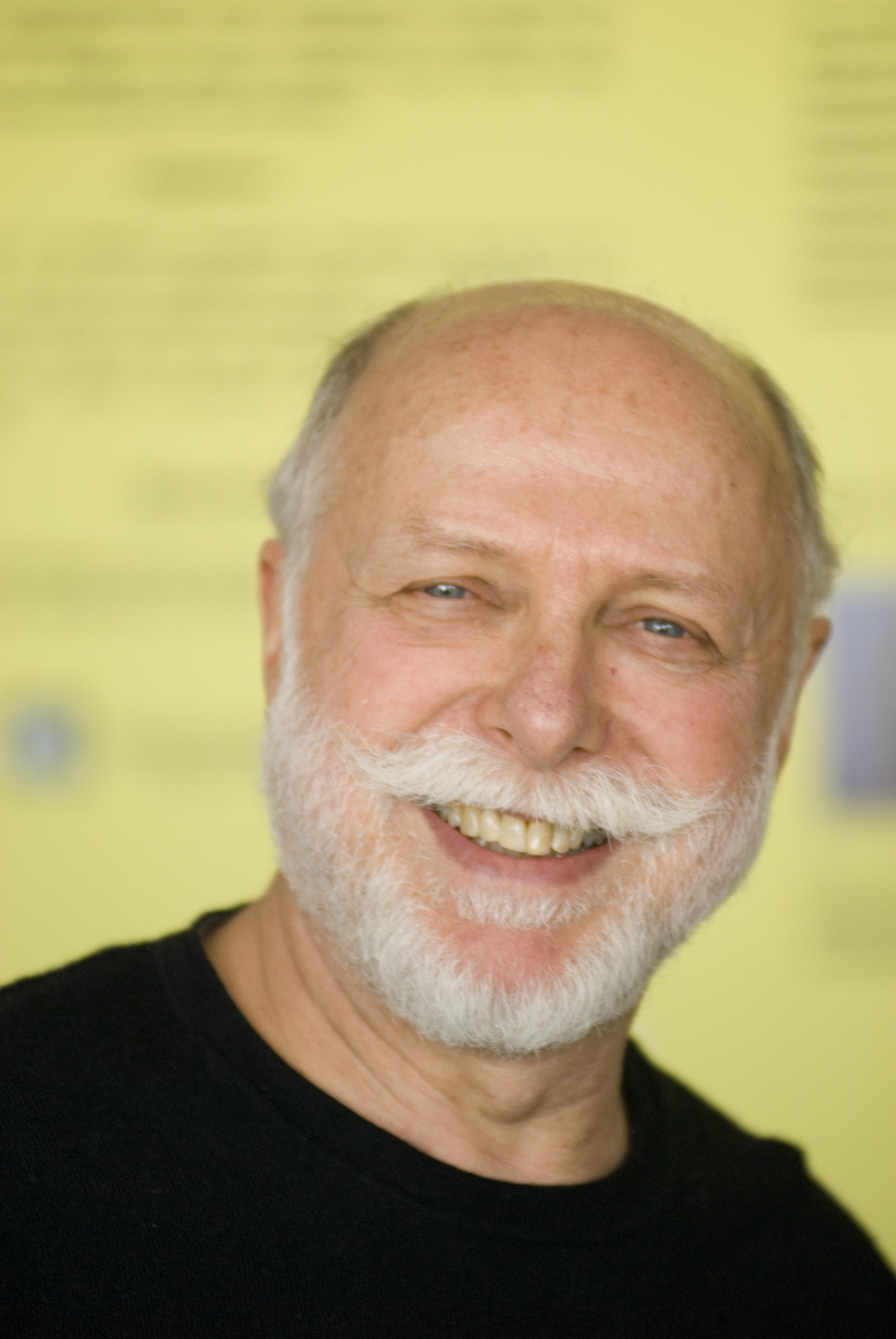
- Born: March 8, 1941 (age 85); Santiago, Chile
- Scientific career
- Fields: Immunology
- Workplaces: Fundacion Ciencia para la Vida; University of Chile; Universidad Nacional Andres Bello; Dartmouth Medical School
- Doctoral advisor: T.T. Tchen

Mario Rosemblatt is a Chilean immunologist. His research established that dendritic cells are responsible for imprinting the tissue-specific homing of T lymphocytes. He is currently Executive Director of Fundacion Ciencia para la Vida (FCV), a non profit institution that carries out scientific and technological research. He is Immunology Professor at the University of Chile and Universidad San Sebastián (2008), He received The Academic Excellence Award - Faculty of Sciences - University of Chle (2008) and the Basic Science Mentee/Mentor Award from The Transplantation Society, USA, among other Awards.

== Biography ==
Mario Rosemblatt earned his Ph.D. degree in immunology at Wayne State University. He has been Research Fellow in Medicine at Harvard University (1973) joining the group of Dr. Edgar Haber, Assistant Professor at Brown University (1976), Investigator at the Boston Biomedical Research Institute (1978) and the Association Against Cancer in France (1981). In 1983, he returned to Chile and joined the Faculty of Sciences at the University of Chile. He was Chairman of the Biology Department and Director of the team that established the degree in Biotechnology at the University of Chile, acting as the first Director of this program. In 1997 he joined the Fundación Ciencia para la Vida acting as its first Executive Director.

== Research ==
During his years at the Boston Biomedical Research Institute Dr. Rosemblatt was the first to publish a report on the use of monoclonal antibody technology to study muscle physiology. The main aspects of his research deals with studies related to the function of regulatory T cells. His team has demonstrated that although B cells and dendritic cells can generate regulatory T cells by themselves, a mixture of both antigen-presenting cells improves their capacity to efficiently generate regulatory T cells. He also has established that gut dendritic cells are responsible for the production of retinoic acid and therefore for the induction of a tolerogenic environment in the gut. As an immunologist he participated in the development of a salmon vaccine –presently in the market, licensed to Novartis- against the Pitsireckettsia salmonis a deadly pathogen that affects the salmon industry in Chile.
Mario Rosemblatt is a member of the American Association of Immunologists, of the Transplantation Society, of the Chilean Society for Cell Biology and the Chilean Society of Immunology.

== Publications ==
=== Selection of Papers ===
- Jørgensen TN, Alfaro J, Enriquez HL, Jiang C, Loo WM, Atencio S, Bupp MR, Mailloux CM, Metzger T, Flannery S, Rozzo SJ, Kotzin BL, Rosemblatt M., Bono MR, Erickson LD. Development of murine lupus involves the combined genetic contribution of the SLAM and FcgammaR intervals within the Nba2 autoimmune susceptibility locus. J Immunol. 15; 775-86, 2010
- C. Moore, D. Sauma, P. Reyes, J. Morales, M. Rosemblatt, M.R. Bono and J.A. Fierro. Dendritic Cells and B Cells Cooperate in the Generation of CD4+CD25+Foxp3+ Allogeneic T Cells. Transplant. Proc. 42; 371-5, 2010
- Elgueta R., Sepulveda F., E. Vilches F., Vargas L., Mora J.R., Bono M.R., Rosemblatt M. Imprinting of CCR9 on CD4 T cells requires IL-4 signalling on mesenteric lymph node dendritic cells. J. Immunol. 180; 6501-7, 2008
- Gabrielle Faure-André, Pablo Vargas, Maria-Isabel Yuseff, Mélina Heuzé, Jheimmy Diaz, Danielle Lankar, Veronica Steri, Jeremy Manry, Stéphanie Hugues, Fulvia Vascotto, Jérôme Boulanger, Graça Raposo, Maria-Rosa Bono, Mario Rosemblatt, Matthieu Piel and Ana-Maria Lennon-Duménil. CD74, the MHC class II-associated Invariant Chain, regulates the motility and in vivo migration of dendritic cells. Science 322; 1705–1710, 2008
- Bono MR, Elgueta R, Sauma D, Pino K, Osorio F, Michea, P, Fierro A, Rosemblatt M. The essential role of chemokines in the selective regulation of lymphocyte homing. Cytokine and Growth Factor Reviews. 18: (1-2): 33-43, 2007
- Micah J. Benson, Karina Pino-Lagos, Mario Rosemblatt and Randolph J. Noelle. All-trans retinoic acid mediates enhanced Treg growth, differentiation and gut homing in the face of high levels of co-stimulation. J. Exp. Med. 204: 1765-74, 2007
- M. Rosemblatt and M.R. Bono. “Functional consequences of immune cell adhesion to endothelial cells”. Current Pharmaceutical Design, 10: 109-120, 2004
- J.R. Mora, M.R. Bono, N. Manjunath, W. Weninger, M. Rosemblatt, U.H. Von Andrian. "Peyer's patch dendritic cells provide tissue-specific instructions for effector T cell homing to the gut". Nature 424:88-93, 2003
- L. I. Reyes, P. Escobar, M. R. Bono and M. Rosemblatt. “B lymphocyte adhesion to endothelial cells from human lymphoid tissue modulates tyrosine phosphorylation and endothelial cell activation”. J. Immunol. 169: 5881-5888, 2002
- Ana-Maria Lennon-Duménil, Arnold H. Bakker, René Maehr, Herman S. Overkleeft, Mario Rosemblatt, Hidde L. Ploegh and Cécile Lagaudrière-Gesbert. "Analysis of protease in live antigen-presenting cells show regulation of the phagosomal proteolytic contents during dendritic cell activation ". J. Exp. Med. 169: 529-539, 2002
- Rosemblatt M., Gaugler M.H., Leroy C., Coulombel L. Coexpression of two fibronectin receptors, VLA-4 and VLA-5 on immature erythroblastic precursor cells. J. Clinic. Invest. 87: 6, 1991.
- Rosemblatt M., Hidalgo C., Vergara C., Ikemoto N. Immunological and biochemical properties of transverse tubule membranes from rabbit skeletal muscle. J. Biol. Chem. 256: 8140, 1981
- Rosemblatt M., Haber E. Isolation of a variable domain fragment from a homogeneous antibody heavy chain. Biochem. 17: 3877, 1978

=== Books and Book Chapters ===
- WILHELM V., ENGEL, E., MIQUEL A., JAMETT A., AGUAYO J., MÜLLER I., MORALES C., HERNÁNDEZ C., SOZA C., SOZA J., VILLEGAS J., BERNALES S., MARTÍNEZ R., ROSEMBLATT M., BURZIO L.O. y VALENZUELA P.D.T. Piscirickettsia salmonis: Un enfoque genómico para un problema de la salmonicultura. Biotecnología Marina, Paniagua, J. (ed.). Editorial AGT S.A., México, p. 188- 220. 2005
- PALOMO, A. FERREIRA, C. SEPULVEDA, M. ROSEMBLATT, U. VERGARA. Editores. Fundamentos de Inmunología. Ed. Universidad de Talca, Talca, Chile. Segunda Edición. 2002
- R. MORA and M. ROSEMBLATT. Receptores de Adhesión, “Homing” y Activación de Linfocitos. Capítulo 12. Eds. I. Palomo, A. Ferreira, C. Sepúlveda, M. Rosemblatt y U. Vergara. Ed. Universidad de Talca, Talca, Chile. 2002
- R. NAVES and M. ROSEMBLATT. Ontogenia y Diferenciación de Células T y B. Capítulo 13. Eds. I. Palomo, A. Ferreira, C. Sepúlveda, M. Rosemblatt y U. Vergara. Ed. Universidad de Talca, Talca, Chile. 2002
- M. ROSEMBLATT. Nuevas alianzas en la comunidad Biotecnológica Chilena. En: Organismos Genéticamente Modificados. Producción, Comercialización, Bioseguridad y Percepción Pública. Eds. Dr. Lionel Gil y Bq. Carlos Irarrázabal. pp 183–188. 2000
- PALOMO, A. FERREIRA, C. SEPÚLVEDA, M. ROSEMBLATT, U. VERGARA. Editores. Fundamentos de Inmunología. Ed. Universidad de Talca, Talca, Chile, 1998
- M. ROSEMBLATT. Moléculas de Adhesión. Capítulo 11. En: Fundamentos de Inmunología. Eds. I. Palomo, A. Ferreira, C. Sepúlveda, M. Rosemblatt y U. Vergara. Ed. Univ. de Talca. Talca. pp 251–270. 1998
- M. ROSEMBLATT. Diferenciación Linfocitaria. Capítulo 12. En: Fundamentos de Inmunología. Eds. I. Palomo, A. Ferreira, C. Sepúlveda, M. Rosemblatt y U. Vergara. Ed. Univ. de Talca. Talca. pp 2271–286. 1998
- COULOMBEL L, VUILLET-GAUGLER MH, KEIFFERN N, ROSEMBLATT M., Vainchenker W, Breton-Gorius J. Adhesion of erythroid cells to fibronectin and identification of receptors for extracellular matrix proteins. In The hematopoietic microenvironment. M Long and M Whicha eds. Johns Hopkins. University Press USA. p. 190-205.1993
- ROSEMBLATT M., PÉREZ G, ANTONIU B, REILLEY E, IKEMOTO N: Monoclonal antibodies as probes of triad structure and excitation contraction coupling in skeletal muscle. In: Signal Transduction in Biological System. S. C. Hidalgo et al. eds. Plenum Press, New York USA. p. 371. 1990
- ROSEMBLATT M. Hibridomas y Anticuerpos Monoclonales. In: La revolución de la Bioingeniería. F Monckeberg Ed. Mediterráneo-Chile. p. 78. 1988
- IKEMOTO N., MESZAROS M., MORIL M., KIM D.H., ROSEMBLATT M. Molecular mechanism of calcium release from sarcoplasmic reticulum in vitro. Current status and prospects. In: Perspectives in Biological Energy Transduction. Academic Press. Tokyo. p. 207. 1987
- BURTON J., ROSEMBLATT M., HABER E. Approaches to the synthesis of an antibody combining site. In: Antibodies in human diagnostic and therapy. Raven Press. New York. p. 205. 1977
- HABER E., MARGOLIES M.N., CANNON L.E, ROSEMBLATT M. Restricted clonal responses: A tool in understanding antibody specificity. In: Molecular approaches to immunology. Academic Press. New York. p. 303. 1975
