= Heinz Küstner =

German gynecologist and obstetrician

Heinz Küstner (January 16, 1897 – August 21, 1966) was a German gynecologist and obstetrician who helped develop the Prausnitz–Küstner test while an assistant of Otto Prausnitz. He died in 1966 after years of accidental inoculation from his own experiments with antibodies and infectious agents isolated after gynecologic operations.
