= Christopher E. Rudd =

Canadian immunologist-biochemist

Professor Christopher E. Rudd FRSC FRSB FRCPath FMedSci

Professor of Medicine, Université de Montréal

Professor of Molecular Immunology, University of Cambridge
- In office 2005–2016

Personal details
- Born: November 2, 1963 (age 63) Toronto, Ontario, Canada

Christopher Edward Rudd, is a Canadian-born immunologist-biochemist. He is currently Professor of Medicine at the Universite de Montreal and Director, Immunology-Oncology at the Centre de Recherche Hôpital Maisonneuve-Rosemont (CR-HMR).

== Early life and education ==
Christopher Rudd was born in Toronto, Ontario, Canada on November 2, 1963. He was educated at the Jesuit-run Brebeuf College School and at McGill University in Montreal, received an M.Sc. degree from the University of Ottawa, Ph.D. and D.Sc. degrees from University College, London and an MA from the University of Cambridge. He has held professorship positions at Harvard Medical School (1989-2002), Imperial College London (2000-2005), was a Principal Investigator at the Dana-Farber Cancer Institute (1988-2002) and the Professor of Molecular Immunology at the University of Cambridge (2005-2016).

== Research ==
Rudd is credited with having had a major impact on the understanding of the intracellular signals that control T-cell immunity. Rudd was the first to discover that intracellular protein kinases interact with surface receptors to generate an intracellular protein-tyrosine phosphorylation cascade, by identifying the interaction of T-cell co-receptors CD4 (also the receptor for the human immunodeficiency virus, HIV-1) and CD8 on T-cells with protein-tyrosine kinase p56lck. His discovery provided the first example of a role for members of the proto-oncogene pp60src kinase family in normal cell signaling. Other receptors were later found to use src-related kinases to regulate cell growth. In terms of immunology, the CD4- and CD8-p56lck complexes are now widely accepted as the initiators of the T cell activation, leading to the recruitment of a second tyrosine kinase ZAP-70 that control the ability of T-cells to respond to foreign pathogens, foreign transplants and cancer cell neo-antigens.

Rudd also uncovered signaling mechanisms by which co-receptors CD28, CTLA-4 and ICOS1 modulate T-cell responses. By showing that CTLA-4 activates T-cell motility and migration, he proposed the 'reverse-stop signal model' to account for CTLA-4 inhibition of T-cell responses to antigen. His research also showed that a mutant form of the immune cell adapter protein termed ADAP, identified in his lab, blocks the infection of T-cells by the Human Immunodeficiency Virus (HIV-1). Further, his lab has pioneered the use of small molecule inhibitors (SMIs) of the kinase glycogen synthase kinase-3 (GSK-3) to down-regulate the inhibitory co-receptor programmed cell death-1 (PD-1) in cancer immunotherapy.

Rudd's work has had important clinical outcomes as it laid the foundation for chimeric antigen receptor (CAR) cancer therapy that has been pioneered by Zelig Eshhar (Israel) and Carl June (USA). T cells transduced with chimeric receptors to recognize and kill cancer cells have employed immunoreceptor tyrosine-based activation motifs (ITAMs) (a target of p56lck), as well as CD28 signaling motifs that were identified by Rudd's lab.

== Recognition ==
Rudd has received awards including the Cancer Research Institute/Benjamin Jacobson Family Investigator Award (New York), Claudia Adams Barr Research Award (Boston) and was a Scholar of the Leukemia Society of America and a Principal Research Fellow (PRF) of the Wellcome Trust. He was elected a Fellow of the Royal College of Pathologists (FRCPath) and the Academy of Medical Sciences (FMedSci), the Royal Society of Canada (FRSC), the Canadian Academy of Health Sciences (CAHS) and the American Association for the Advancement of Science (Fellow AAAS). Over the years, Rudd has trained many graduate students at Ph.D. level, some of whom hold prestigious academic positions in different parts of the world.

His nomination as a Fellow of the Academy of Medical Sciences (FMedSci) in 2002 reads:

He has made major contributions to our understanding of T cell activation, and has defined several of the key molecular pathways that connect cell membrane receptor ligation with gene transcription. In particular, he made the seminal discovery that that CD4 and CD8 co-receptor molecules are linked to the p56lck src family kinase. These complexes are now widely accepted as the initiators of T cell activation of phosphorylation of several key substrates. These observations have had important implications in the field of oncology, since for the first time, a function was provided for the p60 src family of proto-oncogenes in normal cell growth.

== Publications ==
- Rudd CE, Trevillyan JM, Wong LL, Dasgupta JD, Schlossman SF. (1998) The CD4 receptor is complexed to a T-cell specific tyrosine kinase (pp58) in detergent lysates from human T lymphocytes. Proc Nat'l Acad Sci USA. 85, 5190–94.
- Barber, EK, Dasgutpa JD, Schlossman SF, Trevillyan JM, Rudd CE. (1989) The CD4 and CD8 antigens are coupled to a protein-tyrosine kinase (p56lck) that phosphorylates the CD3 complex. Proc. Nat'l. Acad. Sci. USA 86, 3277–81.
- Rudd CE. CD4, CD8 and the TcR/CD3 Complex: a novel class of protein tyrosine kinase receptor (1990) Immunology Today, 11, 400-406
- Schneider H, Downey J, Smith A, Zinselmeyer BH, Rush C, Brewer JM, Wei B, Hogg N, G Garside P, Rudd CE. (2006) Reversal of the TCR stop signal by CTLA-4. Science. 313,1972-5.
- Wei B, Han L, Abbink TEM, Elisabetta G, Lim D, Thaker R, Gao W, Wang J, Lever A, Jolly C, Wang H, Rudd CE (2013) Immune adaptor ADAP in T cells regulates HIV-1 transcription and cell-cell viral spread via different co-receptors. Retrovirol. 10 (1):101.
