= Wan Quan =

Chinese pediatrician (1495–1585)

- Traditional Chinese: 萬全
- Simplified Chinese: 万全
Transcriptions
Standard Mandarin
- Hanyu Pinyin: Wàn Quán

Wan Mizhai
- Traditional Chinese: 萬密齋
- Simplified Chinese: 万密斋
Transcriptions
Standard Mandarin
- Hanyu Pinyin: Wàn Mìzhāi

Wan Quan (1495–1585), also known as Wan Mizhai, was a Ming dynasty pediatrician. He was the third in his family to practice medicine. He advocated that children be frequently exposed to sunlight and fresh air and trained to resist cold. He also believed that frightening a child was harmful to him or her, as was overfeeding or overmedicating. Wan was the first individual to have written about variolation, an early smallpox vaccination technique, in his treatise Douzhen Xinfa (痘疹心法, lit. 'Instruction on Smallpox and Measles'), published in 1549.
