= George Heist =

American immunologist

George D. Heist (1886–1920) was an immunologist specializing in the study of infections of meningococcal bacteria that often result in meningococcal disease, which is well known as highly lethal and debilitating, and extremely difficult to treat.

In 1919, Dr Heist and co-workers [Heist et al., 1922] established that clotted blood from different persons varied in its ability to kill Neisseria meningitidis in a capillary tube. When Heist, whose blood had no bactericidal activity, acquired an N. meningitidis infection, the link between serum bactericidal activity and resistance to meningococcal infection was proven" (Pollard et al. 2004, p. 1812).

"Dr. George D. Heist of Philadelphia, a scientist who gave the first description of complement system deficiency and who himself died of meningococcal meningitis. The paper of Heist et al. (1922) stated: 'The subsequent history of man 'H' illustrates the lack of resistance to meningococcal infection that accompanies absence of bactericidal power against the meningococcus. Man 'H' was no other than Dr. George D. Heist, the chief author of this paper. With no known contact with patient or carrier, in the absence of any known cases in the city, Dr. Heist in August, 1920, developed epidemic cerebrospinal meningitis, and although the diagnosis was made early, the patient succumbed – a loss beyond measure to science and to his friends. The unique interest attaching to the case suggests the publication of certain particulars. Dr. Heist was 36 years of age. His father had died at the age of 24 of typhoid fever, the course of which presented many points of similarity to the fatal illness of the son. Four paternal uncles had died of acute illnesses that were said to have 'gone to the head.' The work reported by Heist et al. (1922) concerned bactericidal properties of whole blood against strains of meningococcus. Control blood without bactericidal activity came from Dr. Heist. Schifferli and Hirschel (1985) excluded deficiency of an early component of complement because of the absence of recurrent pyogenic infection or features of lupus. They excluded properdin deficiency, which can be accompanied by susceptibility to meningococcal meningitis, because of its X-linked inheritance (312060)." (McKusic, 2005)
