= Meat allergy =

Meat allergy can refer to:

- Alpha-gal syndrome, allergy to meat from mammals (except ape meat or genetically modified meat without alpha-gal)
- Pork–cat syndrome, cross-reaction where cat allergy sufferers also become allergic to pork meat
- Poultry allergy, allergy to meat from chicken, turkey, et cetera
