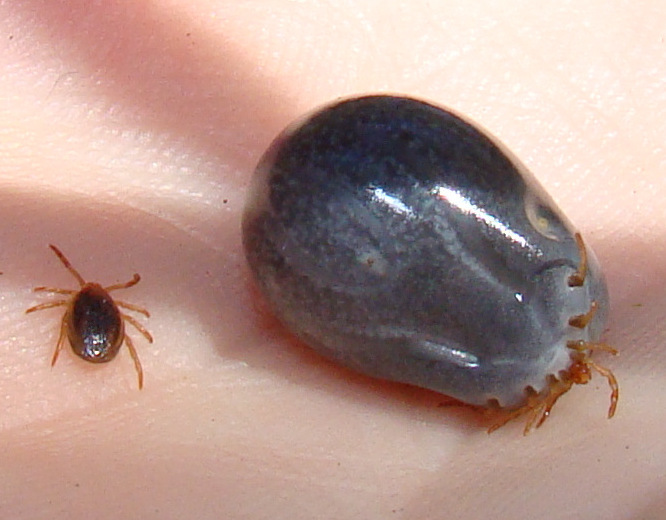
- Ixodes holocyclus before and after feeding

Scientific classification
- Kingdom: Animalia
- Phylum: Arthropoda
- Subphylum: Chelicerata
- Class: Arachnida
- Order: Ixodida
- Family: Ixodidae
- Genus: Ixodes
- Species: I. holocyclus

Binomial name
- Ixodes holocyclus Neumann, 1899

= Ixodes holocyclus =

Species of tick

Ixodes holocyclus, commonly known as the Australian paralysis tick, is one of about 75 species in the Australian tick fauna and is considered the most medically important. It can cause paralysis by injecting neurotoxins into its host. It is usually found in a 20-kilometre wide band following the eastern coastline of Australia. Within that range, Ixodes holocyclus is the tick most frequently encountered by humans and their pets. Because the same area includes Australia's most densely populated regions, bites on people, pets and livestock are relatively common.

Paralysis ticks are found in many types of habitat, particularly areas of high rainfall such as wet sclerophyll forest and temperate rainforest. The natural hosts for the paralysis tick include koalas, bandicoots, possums and kangaroos.

== Common names ==
The use of common names has led to many colloquial expressions for Ixodes holocyclus. The most generally accepted name is Australian paralysis tick or simply paralysis tick. The following table gives some of the other names used to describe various stages of Ixodes holocyclus. Many of these common names, such as dog tick or bush tick, are best not used for Ixodes holocyclus because they are also used for some of the other ticks found in Australia.

Used (and misused) common names for Ixodes holocyclus	Life stage/gender referred to	Comments
Australian paralysis tick	All stages	The preferred common name for Ixodes holocyclus. There are other ticks around the world also causing paralysis.
Scrub tick	Adult female, Adult male	In Queensland, scrub tick is also used for Haemaphysalis longicornis.
Bush tick	Adult female, Adult male	Throughout Australia, bush tick is also used for Haemaphysalis longicornis.
Dog tick	Adult female, Adult male	In New South Wales, dog tick is more correctly used for Rhipicephalus sanguineus (the brown dog tick).
Wattle tick	Adult female, Adult male	Wattle tick was used by pioneers in the Illawarra region of NSW to describe the tick causing paralysis, especially in sheep.
Common hardback tick	Adult female, Adult male	Common hardback tick was used in The Northern Herald, Sydney (August 1996). This expression perhaps emphasises that Ixodes holocyclus is indeed a 'hard tick' and that it is also the most common tick encountered by humans and animals in the Sydney region.
Bottle tick or blue bottle tick	Adult female	Bottle tick describes that the engorging tick becomes swollen with fluid (the host's blood). The addition of 'blue' probably refers to a bluish hue associated with the mid-sized engorged female. It also sounds like another venomous animal, the marine stinger of the same name, the 'blue bottle' or Portuguese Man o' War.
Shell-back tick	Adult male	Shell-back tick describes the tortoise-shell appearance of the large shield (scutum; more specifically, conscutum) that covers the entire dorsum of the adult male.
Grass tick	Nymph and larva	The term grass tick is usually used to refer to the smaller stages of Ixodes holocyclus, but the term delivers little useful information because any tick can be found in the grass.
Seed tick	Larva	The term seed tick usually is used to refer to the smallest stage of Ixodes holocyclus.
Shower tick	Larva	The term shower tick presumably refers to how humans can become seemingly showered by hundreds of larvae at a time; this is because they have hatched from a single cluster of eggs (thousands) which have not yet been distributed by the first of three hosts.
Scrub itch tick	Larva	The term scrub itch tick is used in Queensland to describe the larvae of Ixodes holocyclus, which often infest humans and animals in huge numbers, causing a rash. Without careful inspection, the presence of the tiny larval ticks may be missed until they engorge to an appreciable size.

== Early scientific history ==
One of the earliest Australian references to ticks as a problem in human disease is found in the journal kept by Captain William Hovell during his 1824–1825 journey with Hamilton Hume from Lake George to Port Phillip. He remarked on "the small insect called the tick, which buries itself in the flesh, and would in the end destroy either man or beast if not removed in time".

James Backhouse, a well-travelled Quaker during the early colonial period, gave the following account: "At Colongatta, in Shoal Haven...district, which, like that of Illawarra, is much more favorable for the grazing of horned cattle than for sheep. Among the enemies of the latter in these rich, coast lands, is the Wattle Tick, a hard flat insect of a dark colour, about the tenth of an inch in diameter, and nearly circular, in the body; it insinuates itself beneath the skin, and destroys, not only sheep, but sometimes foals and calves. Paralysis of the hind quarters often precedes death in these cases. Sometimes it occasions painful swellings, when forcibly removed from the human body, after having fixed its anchor-like head and appendages in the skin. To prevent this inconvenience, we several times, made them let go their hold, by smearing them over with oil, or with wet tobacco ashes."

Whilst pioneering settlers knew that ticks posed a threat to their dogs and perhaps to themselves, the paralysis tick was not scientifically described until Louis Georges Neumann did so in 1899. It was further studied by Nuttal and Warburton (1911).

By 1921, Dodd had established a definitive link between Ixodes holocyclus and clinical disease in three dogs. His findings were that it took five to six days from time of attachment for clinical signs to develop, with motor paralysis being the major neurological symptom.

The life cycle of the tick was studied chiefly by Ian Clunies Ross. Clunies Ross also demonstrated that a toxin produced by the tick, and not some infective agent carried by the tick, was responsible for the paralysis. The life cycle was further studied by Oxer and Ricardo (1942) and later summarised by Seddon (1968).

In 1970, Roberts' work Australian Ticks gave the first comprehensive description of Australian ticks, including Ixodes holocyclus.

The first confirmed human death in Australia due to tick envenomation was reported by Cleland in 1912, when a large, engorged tick caused flaccid paralysis in a child, progressing to asphyxiation. Headstones at the Cooktown cemetery attribute some human deaths to ticks.

In the first half of the 20th century, at least 20 human deaths were attributed to the paralysis tick. Eighty percent of the victims reported in New South Wales between 1904 and 1945 were children aged under four years. Many cases of "infantile paralysis" (later known as poliomyelitis) may well have been misdiagnosed and actually been cases of tick paralysis.

== Anatomy, life cycle and behavior ==
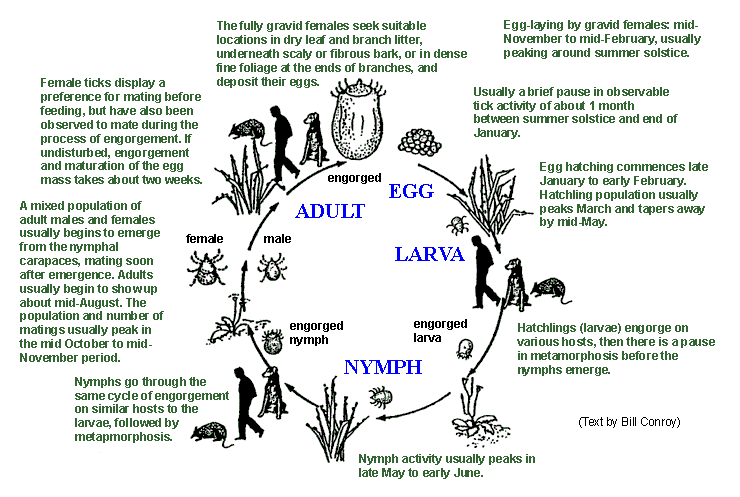
Life cycle of Ixodes holocyclus

=== Overview ===
The life cycle of Ixodes holocyclus consists of four stages: egg, larva, nymph, adult. Ixodes holocyclus requires three hosts to complete its life cycle, thus it is a "three-host tick". Ticks hatch as six-legged larvae after an incubation period of 40 to 60 days. Larvae search for a blood meal from a host, feed for four to six days, then drop from the host and moult to become an eight-legged nymph. Nymphs require a second blood meal before they can moult again to become an adult. Female adults then require a further blood meal of up to ten days before dropping off to lay up to 3000 eggs in leaf litter. Male adults will search for females on the host for mating, and to parasitise the females for blood meals. That life cycle takes around a year to complete, with minimum being 135 days, and the maximum 437 days.

To find a host, ticks "quest", climbing onto vegetation and waving forelegs slowly until a host comes within reach. When on the host, they may not attack immediately, but wander for up to two hours until attaching on the back of the host's head or behind an ear. Certain chemicals, such as carbon dioxide (hence the use of "dry ice" baits), as well as heat and movement, serve as stimuli during the questing behaviour.

Both female and male ticks quest for a host, but for different reasons. The female quests for a blood meal, the male to search the host for a female tick in order to mate and feed from her. Males may parasitise female ticks by piercing their cuticles with their mouth parts to feed on the haemolymph, and up to four males have been found feeding on one female tick. Adult male ticks rarely blood-feed on a host. The outside surface, or cuticle, of hard ticks grows to accommodate the large volume of blood ingested, which, in adult ticks, may be anywhere from 200 to 600 times their unfed body weight. When a tick is fully engorged it is said to be replete.

=== Egg ===
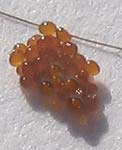

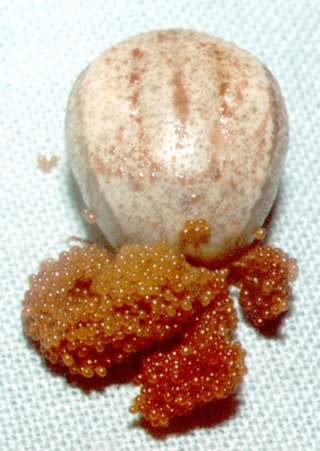
Female adult Ixodes holocyclus with eggs

Adult females lay between 2000 and 6000 eggs in leaf and branch litter, under the scaly or fibrous bark of certain trees and shrubs, or in dense fine foliage near the tips of branches. They use a wax-like substance to make a cohesive mass of eggs and attach them at the selected site. After 40–110 days incubation, a small fraction of the eggs survive and hatch to larvae. Development occurs with suitable warmth and high humidity (e.g. in moist leaf litter).

=== Larva ===

Larvae, also known as "seed ticks" and sometimes "grass ticks", emerge from the eggs and move towards lateral branches, or across grassy areas during humid weather, to find and attach to their hosts. Larvae undergo 7–44 days of hardening and then climb vegetation (e.g. to the tips of leaves), from where they attach to a passing host. Larvae feed for 4 to 6 days then drop to the ground. Over a further 19- to 41-day period, larvae moult to become nymphs. The overall period in the larval stage, from hatch to moult, is temperature dependent. It takes about 20 days at 27.5 °C and 40 days at 21 °C, but may extend to 36 weeks. Larvae are just visible to the naked eye. Under laboratory conditions unfed larvae can survive for 162 days.

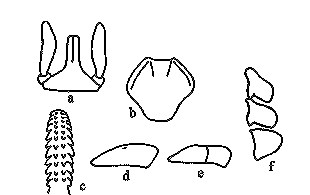

Ixodes holocyclus larva: a, capitulum (dorsal view); b, scutum; c, hypostome; d, tarsus I; e, tarsus IV; f, coxae

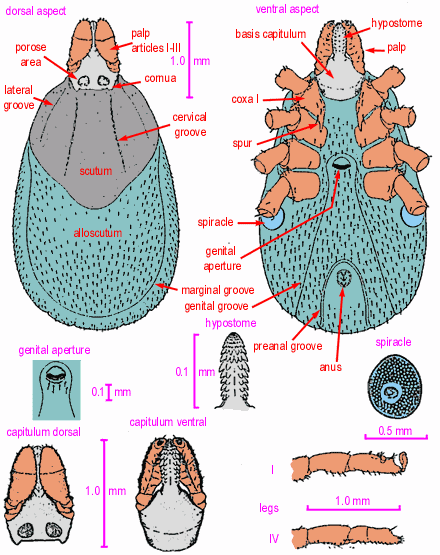
General anatomy of an ixodid female tick, to help with identification landmarks

Diagnosis: Capitulum with slender palpi, hypostome rounded apically, dentition 2/2; scutum about as long as wide, with faint lateral carinae; all coxae with small, external spurs. Body: Broadly oval, 0.5 × 0.4 mm (unfed) to 1.15 × 1.0 mm (engorged) Capitulum: About 0.2 mm in length, basis triangular, about 0.16 mm wide, palpi elongate and slender. Hypostome apically rounded, 0.14 mm in length, dentition 2/2 of 10–12 teeth, the teeth of the inner file blunt and small, some minute denticles apically. Scutum: About as long as broad, 0.31 by 0.32 mm and widest a little anterior to mid-length; lateral carinae present but faint; anterolateral margins usually convex and posterolateral margins concave; cervical grooves short but well defined. Anal grooves: Ill-defined anteriorly and do not converge behind

Legs: Coxae with small external spurs; tarsus I 0.14 mm in length, tarsus IV 0.14 mm in length

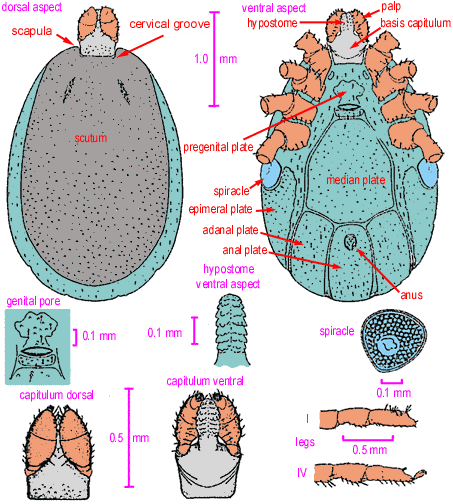
General anatomy of an ixodid male tick, to help with identification landmarks

=== Nymph ===
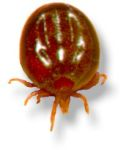

Nymphs are very active and attach to another host on average 5–6 days (but possibly up to 31 days) after moulting. Nymphs feed for 4–7 days, then drop to the ground. After a further 3–11 weeks the nymphs moult to become adult males or females. Again the period is temperature dependent: it takes about 20 days at 24–27 °C but 53–65 days at 10–21 °C. Dry conditions also prolong this period or even kill nymphs. Under laboratory conditions unfed nymphs can survive for 275 days.
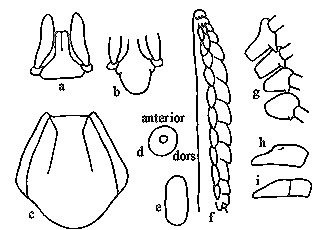

Ixodes holocyclus nymph: a, capitulum (dorsal view); b, capitulum (ventral view); c, scutum; d, spiracular plate; e, sternal plate; f, hypostome; g, coxae; h, tarsus I; i, tarsus IV

Diagnosis (male): Capitulum as in female, hypostome dentition mainly 2/2, 3/3 distally; conscutum about as long as wide with lateral carinae; sternal plate present, oval; anal grooves converging posteriorly but remaining narrowly open; legs as in female. Body: Oval with fine parallel striae and some scattered pale hairs; 1.2 × 0.85 mm (unfed) to 3.5 × 2.5 mm (engorged); marginal grooves well developed and complete in unfed specimens. Capitulum: Length 0.40–0.43 mm. Basis dorsally 0.23–0.25 mm in width; posterior margin straight; posterolateral angles not salient; auriculae well defined. Palps as in female; articles 2 and 3 0.30–0.32 mm in length. Hypostome lanceolate and bluntly pointed; dentition 2/2, 3/3 distally. Scutum: About as wide as long, 0.61 × 0.63 mm – 0.71 × 0.70 mm. Lateral carinae well developed. Punctations few, shallow, scattered. Cervical grooves apparent, continuing to mid-scutal region as superficial depressions. Sternal plate: Oval, 0.27–0.30 mm in length and a little more than twice as long as wide. Spiracular plate: Subcircular, greatest diameter about 0.14 mm. Legs: Coxae armed as in female. Tarsus I tapering gradually, other tarsi more abruptly; length of tarsi I and IV about 0.28 mm.

=== Adult female ===
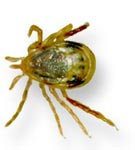

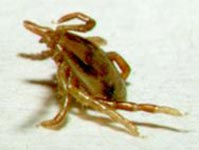

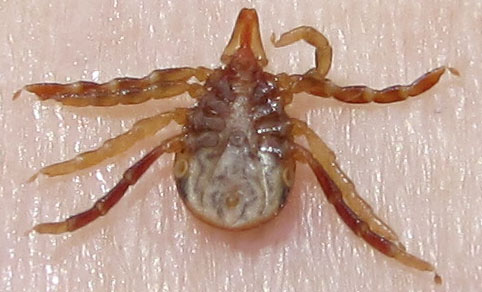
Adult female of Ixodes holocyclus, ventral view showing the genital aperture (upper opening), anus (lower opening) and breathing spiracles (on the sides). One can also distinguish a faint but fully encircling (hence holocyclus) groove around the anus

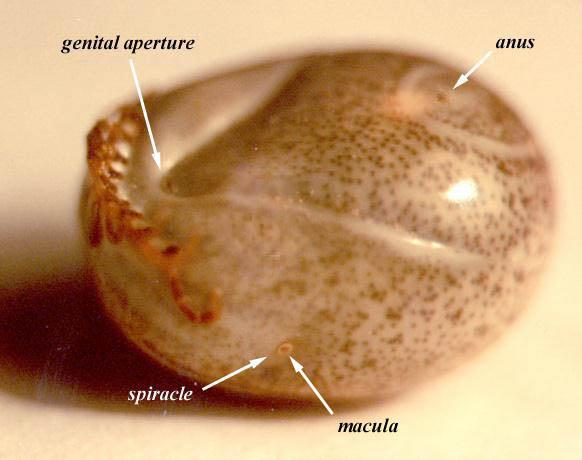
Engorged adult female of Ixodes holocyclus. This lateral view shows the breathing hole (spiracle) as well as the genital and anal grooves which are useful for species identification

The newly moulted adult female becomes increasingly active during the first 6 or 7 days and seeks a host. It attaches to the final host after 7 to 9 days (but possibly up to 77 days). After insemination by a male tick, or sometimes before, a female feeds on blood to gain the nutrients for the egg mass to mature. Adult females engorge for a period of 6–30 days, the time again being temperature dependent. (The 30-day engorgement time is derived from laboratory culture colonies.) Under natural conditions, the time taken for an adult female to engorge while on the host varies from 6 to 21 days, the period being longest in cool weather. When replete, the adult female drops off the host to the ground. After 11–20 days the gravid female starts to lay a batch of 2000 to 6000 eggs (20–200 eggs per day over 16–34 days) into moist vegetation such as leaf and branch litter, under the bark of trees and shrubs, or in foliage near the tips of branches. The eggs are attached as a mass with a wax-like substance. The female tick dies one or two days after egg-laying is complete. Under laboratory conditions, female ticks have been kept alive for more than two years.

Due to the variation in time taken for the female to engorge, a host may carry a tick for up to three weeks without the tick becoming significantly engorged or causing paralysis. However, in warm weather, the female engorges rapidly and, at the same time, injects her toxin into the host, thus causing paralysis if the host is susceptible. The adult female does not usually inject detectable amounts of toxin until the third or fourth day of attachment to the host, with peak amounts being injected on days five and six.

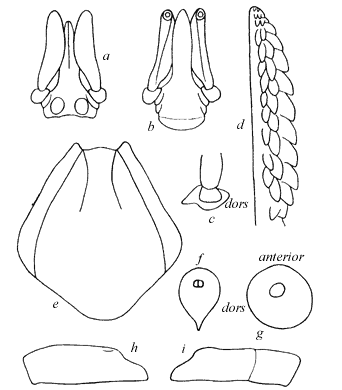
Ixodes holocyclus adult female: a, capitulum (dorsal view); b, capitulum (ventral view); c, palpal article I (lateral view); d, hypostome; e, scutum; f, anal grooves; g, spiracular plate; h, tarsus I; i, tarsus IV.

Diagnosis: A very large tick when fully engorged; scutum about as long as broad and broadest a little posterior to mid length, with strong lateral carinae; capitulum relatively long porose areas deep, cornua usually absent, but when present at most only mild and rounded; auriculae present; hypostome lanceolate, dentition mainly 3/3; no sternal plate; anal grooves meeting at a point behind; all coxae with an external spur decreasing in size posteriorly; trochanters III and IV usually with small, pointed ventral spurs. Body: Unfed specimens, oval, flat, yellowish, 2.6 × 1.1 mm – 3.8 × 2.6 mm; marginal groove well developed and continuous; hairs small, scattered, most numerous in region of marginal fold. Semi-engorged specimens frequently with body widest behind coxa IV and with a waist at level of spiracles. Fully engorged specimens broadly oval, attaining 13.2 × 10.2 mm, living ticks with blue-grey alloscutum, the dorsum light in colour, a dark band in region of marginal groove. Capitulum: Length 1.00–1.035 mm. Basis dorsally 0.60–0.68 mm in width, the lateral submarginal fields swollen and frequently delimited from the depressed, median field by ill-defined carinae; posterior margin sinuous, posterolateral angles swollen, sometimes mildly salient; porose areas large, deep subcircular or oval, the longer axis directed anteriorly, interval frequently depressed, at most about the width of one; basis ventrally with posterior margin rounded and with well-defined, blunt, retrograde auriculae. Palps long and slender, some long hairs ventrally; article I rounded and somewhat salient laterally, inner 'ring' with dorsal tongue-like prolongation and ventrally semicircular and plate-like, the posterior margin of the plate extending beyond the palp; articles 2 and 3 with no apparent suture, 0.75–0.85 mm in length and about four times as long as wide, narrowly rounded distally. Hypostome lanceolate and bluntly pointed; dentition mainly 3/3, the innermost file of small, spaced teeth, basally 2/2. Scutum: As wide as or a little wider than long, widest a little posterior to mid length, 1.6 × 1.7 mm – 2.4 × 2.4 mm, flat medianly, convex external to the long, strong lateral carinae; anterolateral margins practically straight, posterolateral margins mildly concave; posterior anle broadly rounded. Punctations numerous, fine, sometimes a little coarser medianly and laterally, shallow rugae frequently present posteriorly. Cervical grooves well defined but short. Emargination moderate. Scapulae blunt. Genital aperture: On a level with coxa IV, but in engorged specimens sometimes just posterior to this level. Anal grooves: Rounded anteriorly, curving behind anus to meet in a somewhat elongate point. Spiracular plate: Subcircular, greatest dimension 0.40–0.45 mm. Legs: Coxae smooth, I and II sometimes with mild rounded ridges externally, each with a row of long hairs posteriorly and an external spur, longer and more pointed than in male, and decreasing in size posteriorly. Trochanter IV (and sometimes III) frequently with a small, ventral spur. Tarsi tapering a little abruptly; length of tarsus I 0.70–0.80 mm, and of tarsus IV 0.60–0.78 mm.

=== Adult male ===
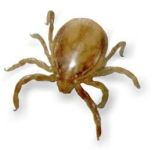

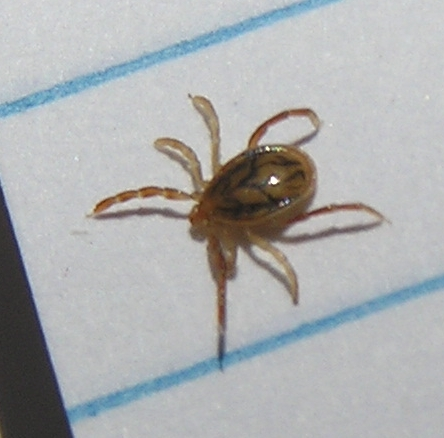
Male adult Ixodes holocyclus

The newly moulted male seeks a host. Male ticks do not engorge from the host, they wander the host searching for unfertilised females with which to mate. The male dies after fertilising the female, although some males can endure for longer if they parasitise the engorging female.

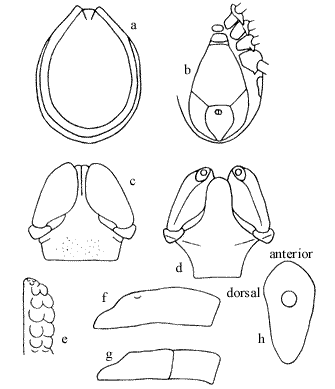
Ixodes holocyclus adult male: a, body (dorsal view); b, body (ventral view); c, capitulum (dorsal view); d, capitulum (ventral view); e, hypostome; f, tarsus I; g, tarsus IV; h, spiracular plate

Diagnosis: Body measurements less than 3.0 × 2.5 mm; lateral grooves completely encircling conscutum, no lateral carinae; punctuations fine; basis capituli punctate dorsally, palpi short and very broad; hypostome dentition 2/2, with rounded teeth; anal plate bluntly pointed behind; adanal plate curving inwardly to a point; coxae with well-defined spurs decreasing in size posteriorly; trochanters III and IV frequently with small, ventral spurs. Body: Oval, sometimes broadly so, 1.9 × 1.6 mm – 3.2 × 2.3 mm; marginal body fold narrow but prominent; hairs dorsally sparse medianly, more numerous on marginal body fold. Capitulum: Length 0.51–0.65 mm in width, surface punctate; posterior margin straight; no cornua; posterolateal margins slightly divergent anteriorly; basis ventrally narrowing to the straight posterior margin, surface with a short anterolateral ridge. Palps short and broad; article 1 rounded and a little salient laterally, ventrally with a transverse rounded flange continuous with ridge on basis; articles 2 and 3 with no apparent suture, 0.33–0.40 mm in length, almost twice as long as broad, rounded distally, hairs moderate in number, some long hairs ventrally. Hypostome short and broad, 0.25–0.28 mm in length, narrowing and shallowly rounded distally; dentition 2/2 of large rounded teeth, some small teeth distally and crenulations basally. Scutum: Oval, convex, only a little smaller than body. Lateral grooves deep and completely encircling the scutum, anteriorly somewhat linear and may simulate mild lateral carinae. Punctations fine, usually most numerous submarginally and anteromedianly; pseudoscutum sometimes faintly apparent. Cervical grooves short, shallow. Emargination moderate. Scapulae blunt. Genital aperture: On a level with anterior margin of coxa III, sometimes at level of second intercoxal space. Ventral plates: Pregenital plate wider than long; median plate 1.5–1.2 mm, the width posteriorly about 3/4 of the length; anal plate 0.75–0.50 mm, anterior margin straight or mildly curved, pointed posteriorly; adanal plates curving to points near the point of the anal plate; plates with scattered punctuations and hairs. Spiracular plate: Elongate, oval, narrow posteriorly, the longer axis directed anteriorly, about 0.50–0.53 mm in length. Legs: Length moderate. Coxae practically contiguous, with a row of long hairs near posterior margin; posterointernal angles of coxae I and II may be somewhat sharp but not salient; all coxae with an external spur, strongest and bluntly pointed on coxa I, smallest on coxa IV. Trochanters III and IV with a small, dark ventral spur, only a tuberosity on II. Tarsi ending somewhat abruptly; length of tarsus I 0.65–0.71 mm and of tarsus IV 0.62–0.70 mm.

=== Distinguishing Ixodes holocyclus from other Australian ticks ===
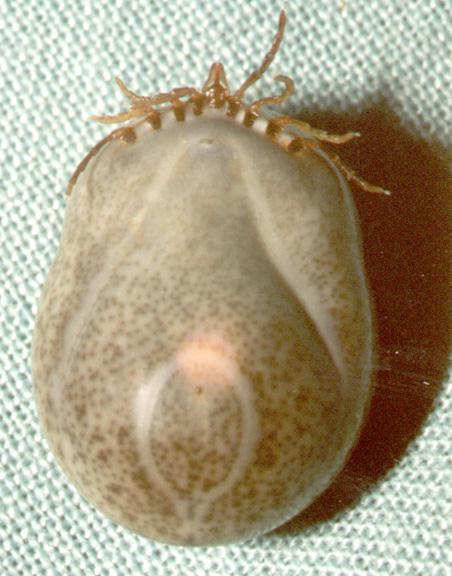
Engorged adult female Ixodes holocyclus showing the complete pear-shaped encirclement of the anus by the anal groove. This feature gives the tick its species name holocyclus, meaning 'complete circle'.

The two features which are most easily recognised and which are characteristic of Ixodes holocyclus:

- The first and last pairs of legs are distinctly darker than the two middle pairs of legs
- The anal groove forms a complete, though somewhat pear-shaped, oval around the anus (this feature gives the tick its species name holocyclus, meaning 'complete circle')

Other ticks which commonly need to be differentiated from Ixodes holocyclus include Rhipicephalus sanguineus (brown dog tick), Haemaphysalis longicornis (bush tick) and Rhipicephalus microplus (cattle tick).

A hospital medical entomology department can provide professional identification of ticks and other medically important insects.

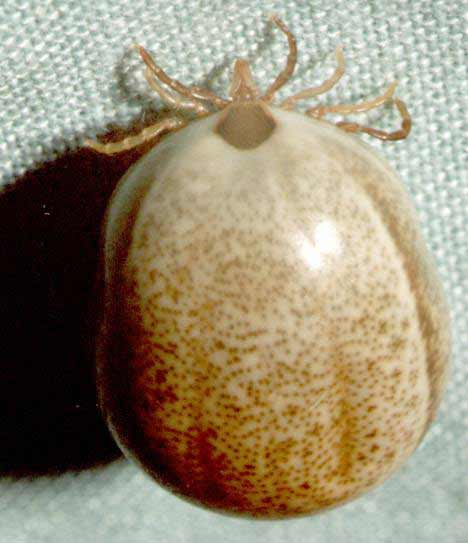
Engorged adult female Ixodes holocyclus showing the darker brown 1st and 4th pairs of legs

=== Hosts ===
Common hosts include long-nosed bandicoots (Parameles nasuta), giant brindle bandicoots (Isoodon torosus), echidnas and possums. Potential hosts include many species of mammals, birds and, occasionally, reptiles. Because of continuous infestation, native animals are usually immune to tick toxins.

Most mammals, such as cattle, sheep, goats, horses, pigs, cats, cavies, rats, mice and humans, can be infested by the tick. Fatalities resulting from a single engorged adult female tick are mostly reported in the young animals of the larger species, and all ages and sizes of the pet species (dogs and cats). Larvae and nymphs can also produce toxic reactions in the host. Fifty larvae or five nymphs can kill a 40 g rat. Larger numbers of either can induce paralysis in dogs and cats. They may be easy to find on short-haired animals, but difficult to find on long-haired animals, such as Persian cats. People who live in a tick-prone area, and whose pets are allowed outdoors, are recommended to inspect their pets every day for ticks. Unfortunately, the ticks are often not discovered until they are large enough to be felt. By that time the tick has subjected the animal to a large amount of toxin. One adult female can produce enough toxin during engorgement to kill four rats. Although it is not typical, an engorging adult female has been known to re-attach several times to different dogs.

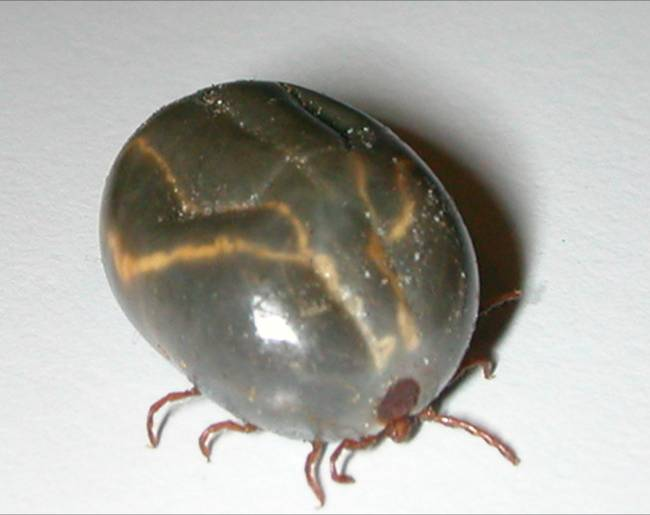
This is Haemaphysalis longicornis (the 'bush tick'), shown here for comparison. Unlike in Ixodes holocyclus, all pairs legs of Haemaphysalis longicornis are of the same shade, the legs are finer, the mouthparts are much shorter, and the shield is rounded

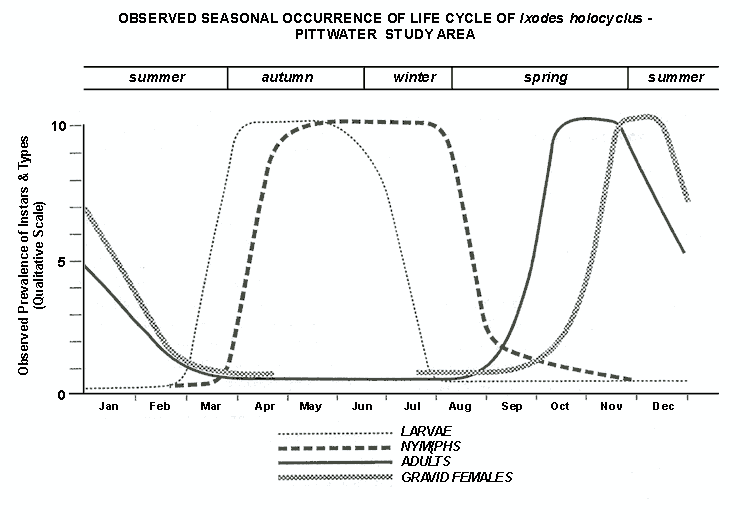
Seasonality of Ixodes holocyclus in the Pittwater area north of Sydney, 1995.

=== Natural predators ===
Natural predators of I. holocyclus include insectivorous birds and wasps.

=== Seasonality ===
Humid conditions are essential for survival of the paralysis tick. Dry conditions, relatively high temperatures (32 °C) and low temperatures (7 °C) are lethal for all stages after a few days. An ambient temperature of 27 °C and high relative humidity is thought to be optimal for rapid development. Very dry or very wet conditions are not ideal.

The tick population in a given year is probably governed by the rainfall in the previous year if temperature variation has been moderate. North-easterly weather, with moisture-laden sea breezes on the east coast of the continent, provides ideal conditions. This pattern usually sets in during spring and early summer. Tick envenomation in animals (especially pets) peaks in spring to mid-summer.

Typically, larvae appear late February to April or May, followed by nymphs from March to September or October and then gradually the adult population from August to February, peaking around December. Under favourable conditions a second cycle may result in a second peak in May. However, infestation by adults can occur at any time of the year when conditions are suitable, even in mid-winter. Only in the very hot summer months are they difficult to find.

Small numbers of each instar are present throughout the year, with the numbers in each life cycle segment rising to plateau levels at particular times and then falling away again. Winter occurrence of gravids varied from nil to very small numbers in two of eight years studied.

== Relative sizes ==
Comparison of non-engorged ticks

Unengorged larvae (6 legs)	Unengorged nymph (8 legs)	Unengorged adult (8 legs)	Engorged adult (8 legs)
Larvae	Nymph	Adult Male or Female	Adult female (engorged)
0.5 mm long, 0.4 mm wide	1.2 mm long, 0.85 mm wide	3.8 mm long, 2.6 mm wide	13.2 mm long, 10.2 mm wide

Measurements refer to the body section only (i.e., legs are not included)

Comparison of engorged ticks
Larval, nymph and adult (female) stages. The adult male tick does not engorge. Male and female larvae and nymphs are similar to each other.

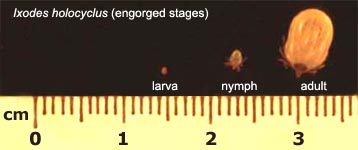

== Sexual dimorphism ==
Only the final adult stage of Ixodes holocyclus shows obvious sex variation. Larvae are not distinguishable as male or female. Nymphs are sexually immature (have no genital aperture).

The male does not engorge. The shield (conscutum) covers the entire dorsal body. It has a tortoiseshell pattern. The mouthpart section (the capitulum) is very short because it is not required for feeding from the host (though it may be used to feed from the female tick). The male tick does not pose a medical risk to humans or animals — the significance of finding a male is that it is looking for a female — so humans and animals should be checked fully for the possible presence of an adult female tick somewhere.
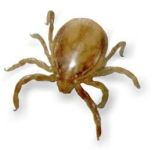
Adult male

The female does engorge. The shield (scutum) covers only the front part of the dorsal body. The mouthpart section (capitulum) is long because it is required for feeding.
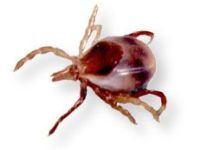
Adult female (early in engorgement)

== Feeding process ==
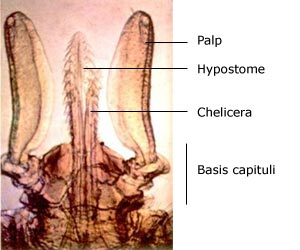
The capitulum of Ixodes holocyclus

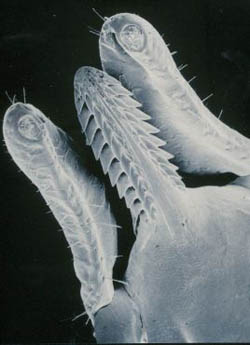
The capitulum of Ixodes holocyclus (scanning electron microscopy)

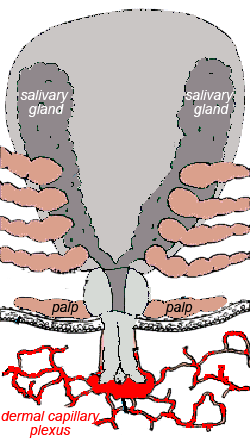
The feeding process of Ixodes holocyclus

Ticks generally are obligate blood feeders. Active stages (larvae, nymphs and adults) of Ixodes holocyclus require blood as a source of nutrition. Adults also require the blood for sperm or egg production. The feeding process of ixodid ticks has first a slow phase for several days followed by a fast phase in the last 12–24 hours before detachment. There may be a tenfold increase in fed versus unfed weights by the end of the slow phase, but there is another tenfold increase by the end of the final fast phase. Leaving the full engorgement as late as possible reduces the chances of detection and removal by the host. The hypostome has a groove along its dorsal surface forming a food canal (also known as the preoral canal) through which blood is drawn from the host and passed on to the mouth and pharynx. During blood feeding by ixodid ticks, the liquid portion of the meal is first concentrated by removal of water and excess ions, which move across the gut epithelium and enter the tick's body cavity (hemocoele). These components are then taken up by the salivary glands, which produce a watery saliva that is injected back into the host.

Blood meal digestion in ticks is similar in all species. The digestive system is histologically divided into foregut, midgut and hindgut. The foregut comprises the sucking pharynx and the oesophagus. The midgut contains a ventriculus with a valve, a variable number of blind diverticula (caeca), and a rectal tube. The hindgut is divided into a rectal bulb and the rectum itself.

The mouthpart section of the tick is known as Latin: capitulum ("little head"). The capitulum is not a true 'head' in the sense that the structures one normally associates with the head (primitive brain, salivary glands) are not contained within it; these structures are located in the 'body' of the tick. Ixodes holocyclus has no eyes.

The palps are the paired tactile and positioning limbs, which are not inserted into the skin but splayed out on the surface. The chelicerae are the paired cutting jaws, which cut a channel into skin for the hypostome. The hypostome is the single feeding tube, which also anchors the tick by its reverse barbs. The basis capituli forms the basal ring of cuticle to which the palps, chelicerae and hypostome are attached. The basis capituli moves in the dorsoventral plane and articulates with the body proper.

Once it has chosen a feeding site, a tick positions itself with its legs so as to elevate its body at a sharp angle. Guided by the palps, the chelicerae cut into the skin with their horizontal cutting action. These rip and tear at the epidermal layers and a small pool of blood is formed. The hypostome is inserted, and this provides the initial attachment strength. In the case of Ixodes holocyclus, the hypostome is inserted very deep into the dermis. The process by which such ticks feed is termed telmophagy (pool feeding). (This contrasts with the process of solenophagy, used by mosquitoes, in which feeding is direct from a small venule.) The resultant pool expands as a result of the anticoagulants released from the salivary glands.

The host reacts against the tick lesion by haemostasis, inflammation and cell-mediated immunity. An array of pharmacologically active substances is injected with the saliva of the tick, including anticoagulants, prostaglandin E2, prostacyclin, apyrase and, in certain tick species, antihistamines. Prostaglandin E2 and prostacyclin inhibit platelet aggregation and dilate blood vessels. Feeding is almost continuous, with pulses of salivation alternating with periods of feeding to ensure continued suppression of host defences.

There is a concentration of saliva and presumably toxin in the granulomatous reaction around the tick mouth parts. It is thought by some experimenters that the residual toxin located in this granuloma is at least partially responsible for the increasing paralysis which occurs after the tick is removed. By comparison, the North American paralysis tick Dermacentor andersoni (found in the Rocky Mtns) does not produce a granuloma at the site of attachment, and in this case the paralysis rapidly regresses after the tick is removed. Unlike Dermacentor andersoni, Ixodes holocyclus is a deep feeder with a long hypostome (which may penetrate as deep as 1689 um).

== Engorgement ==
The following images all depict the adult female of Ixodes holocyclus. Colour and markings change markedly as engorgement progresses. It is the third tick, the moderately engorged adult female (width, at level of the spiracles, more than 4 mm) which is most commonly removed from dogs with tick envenomation. If a fully engorged tick is found on a dog, it suggests that the dog has a certain degree of immunity.

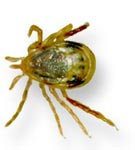
Adult female – No engorgement
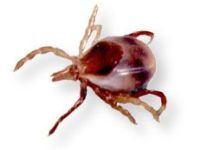
Adult female – Early engorgement
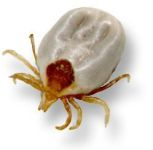
Adult female – Moderate engorgement
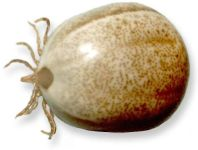
Adult female – Full engorgement
These pictures are not to scale with each other. Because the size of the 'shield' (scutum) does not change as the female tick engorges, it is useful for comparing the relative sizes.

== Distribution and habitat ==
Ixodes holocyclus is found mainly along coastal eastern Australia, from near Cooktown in far north Queensland to Lakes Entrance in Victoria. In places, it is found more than 100 km inland, particularly in areas of moist escarpments and ranges such as the Bunya Mountains of Queensland and the Lower Blue Mountains of New South Wales.

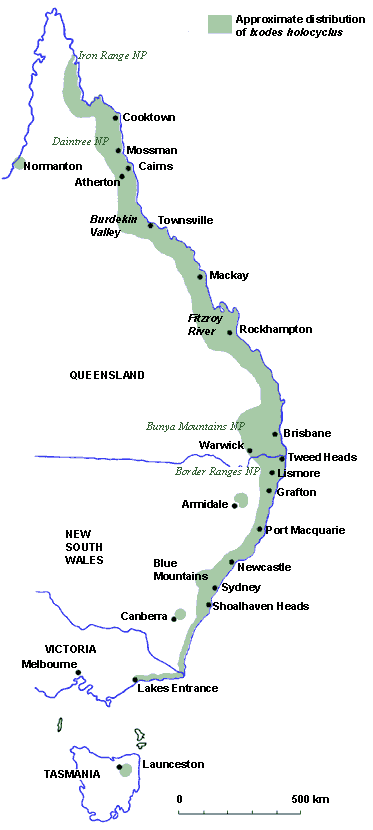
Approximate distribution of Ixodes holocyclus – note that a similar tick in Tasmania is also shown as causing tick paralysis.

The distribution map gives only an approximation of the tick's distribution as the situation is not static. There are reports from inland Victoria, including north-eastern suburbs of Melbourne. This may reflect general movement of insects and ticks from equatorial to polar latitudes which in turn may be related to climate change.

The need for humid conditions largely determines the botanical niche of this species. Low, leafy vegetation provides higher humidity levels by reducing the desiccating effects of wind and direct sunlight. This environment also suits the tick's major host, the bandicoot, as it seeks out grubs and worms in the leaf litter. Certain vegetation may be conducive to paralysis ticks.

There are mixed reports about whether paralysis ticks climb trees. Some references mention ticks climbing to the tops of trees, while others report that they stay within 50 cm of the ground.

== Tick bites ==
=== Overview ===
The kinds of effects caused by bites of Ixodes holocyclus vary in their frequency according to the type of host and whether the tick is at the stage of larva, nymph or adult.

- Humans are most notably affected by local irritation and numbness, allergic reactions and tick-transmitted infectious diseases. Tick paralysis is possible but not common.
- Domestic animals (pets and livestock) are most notably affected by tick paralysis. Allergic reactions and tick-transmitted infectious diseases are possible but rarely diagnosed.
- Native animals are most notably affected by anaemia caused by carrying heavy burdens of ticks drawing large quantities of blood. Tick paralysis is possible but mainly recognised in captive animals where there has been a discontinuity in exposure and so a drop in immunity.

Although there is the possibility of innate differences between species, the variations in effects can largely be explained by how often and how heavily hosts are exposed.

=== Humans ===
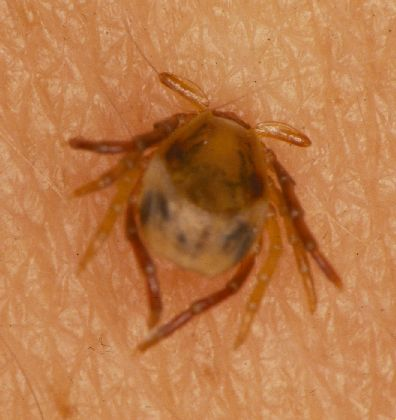
Ixodes holocyclus adult female tick early in attachment on human skin. The palps are splayed out on the surface of the skin.

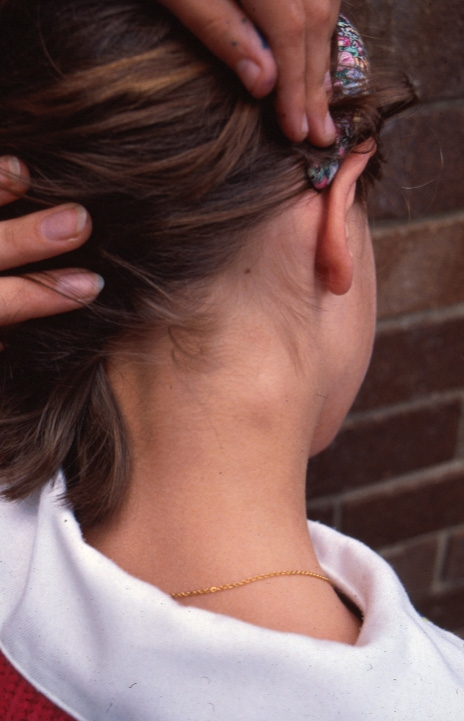
Ixodes holocyclus adult female tick early in attachment on human skin behind ear at hair line. Note swollen lymph node on neck below the tick

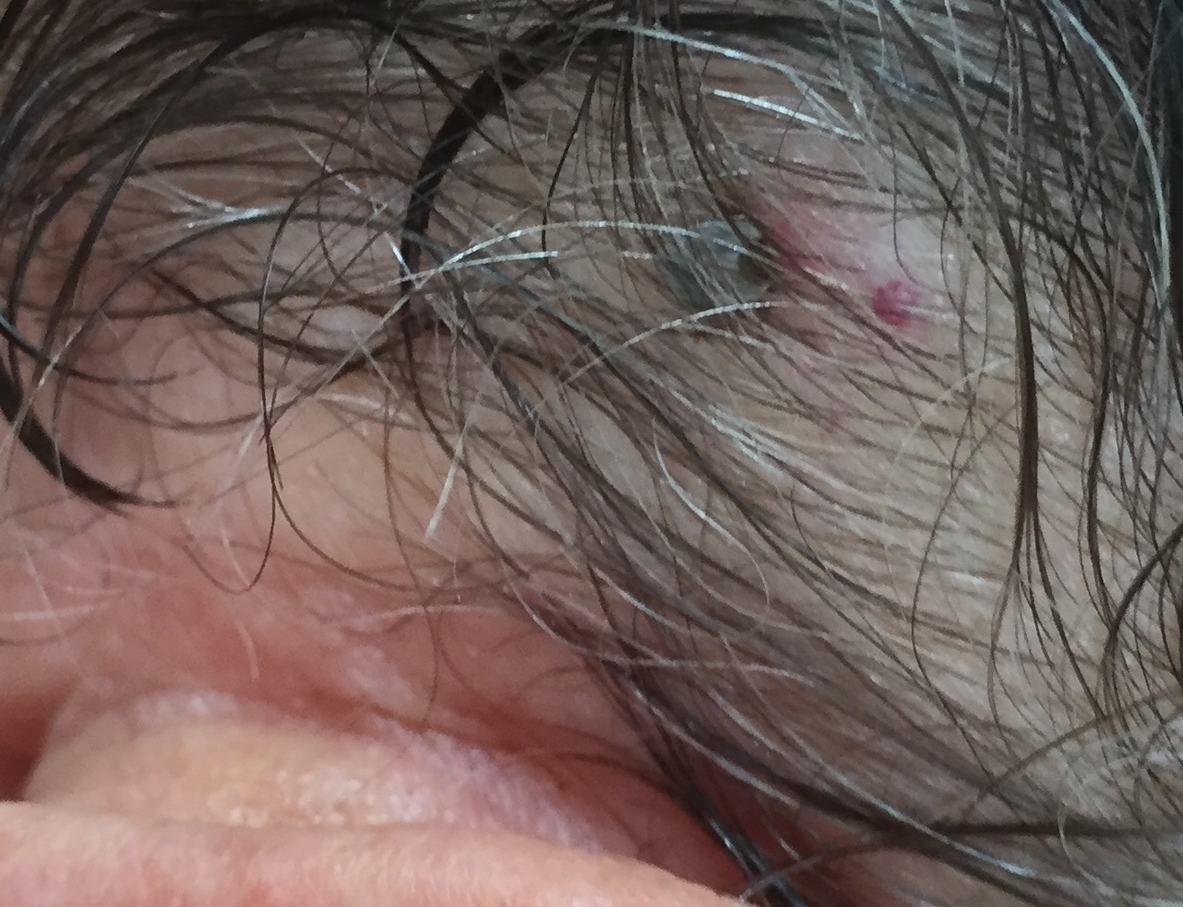
Ixodes holocyclus Adult female tick – four to five day attachment on human skin behind ear. Lymph node on neck is swollen and a very large area around the tick is inflicted with hypoesthesia (numbness)

At the site of a bite by an adult female Ixodes holocyclus one can expect there to be local numbness and an itchy lump which lasts for several weeks.

Although most cases of tick bite are uneventful in humans, some can produce life-threatening effects including severe allergic reactions, tick-transmitted infectious diseases such as Rickettsial Spotted Fever (also known as Queensland tick typhus), and tick paralysis.

Larvae and nymphs, as well as adults, are capable of causing very dramatic allergic reactions. Dramatic local redness and swelling may develop within 2–3 hours of attachment of even one larva.

People have experienced allergic reactions after coming in contact with both live and dead tick products. Having a tick simply walk over a person's hand produces in some people an intense discomfort and itching. What particular components of the tick body cause these reactions is unknown, but it could be a water-soluble component that is excreted through the cuticular canals.

In south-east Queensland a 'maddening rash' (known locally as 'scrub itch') is caused by infestation by many tick larvae. This especially affects people clearing leafy bushland such as lantana scrub.

Whilst systemic paralysis is possible in humans, it is now a relatively rare occurrence. This is because an engorging adult female tick needs to remain attached for several days. This was more likely to occur in the past because there was less medical and public awareness of the problem and perhaps because it was more likely to be misdiagnosed as polio. Paralysis is more likely to occur in children and in situations where ticks are attached in places where they are not easily detected (e.g., under bandages). Up through 1989, 20 human fatalities had been reported in Australia.

If an unusual black scab (eschar) develops at the site of a tick bite, or if there are any other signs of illness occurring within a few weeks of a tick bite (especially flu-like symptoms, fever, generalised skin rash, or muscular or joint pain), a doctor should be consulted and informed about the tick bite. A rickettsial infection (Rickettsia australis or Rickettsia honei) may be the cause. Whilst many such rickettsial infections are self-limiting, early treatment with antibiotics can prevent longer-term problems in some individuals. Doctors may also wish to investigate the possibility of a Lyme-like disease, particularly if there is also a 'bullseye' or target-shaped skin rash (erythema migrans).

=== Domestic animals ===
The tick's paralysing toxin has been estimated to affect as many as 100,000 domestic animals annually, with up to 10,000 pets being referred to veterinary surgeons for treatment.

== Allergy ==
All stages of Ixodes holocyclus are commonly responsible for allergic reactions in humans.

=== Allergic reactions to larvae ===
Attachment of a few larvae to a non-sensitised host provokes little or no response, even though the contact is prolonged over several days. However, towards the end of feeding some itching, redness and localised swelling may develop at the site of attachment.

Repeated infestation with larvae, as occurs in rural and wooded suburban areas where bandicoots are common, rapidly leads to the development of hypersensitivity. Dramatic local redness, numbness, swelling and itching may develop within 2–3 hours of attachment of even one larva if a person has been sensitised by a previous bite. In this case attachment of the larvae leads to formation of intra-epidermal blebs and eventually blisters. These eventually rupture and the larvae detach and are lost. A tick embedded over an eyelid may result in gross facial and neck swelling within a few hours. The person can go on to develop tracheopharyngeal compression within 5–6 hours after the first onset of symptoms.

During damp summers any disturbance of taller plants can produce a shower of tick larvae. When large numbers of larvae attach to a sensitized person, severe allergic dermatitis may result. Such outbreaks are seasonal in southeast Queensland and occur most commonly during January, February and March when larval populations are at their peak. Dermatitis is most commonly encountered in rural workers.

=== Allergic reactions to nymphs and adults ===
Attachment of the nymphal and adult stages produce variable responses, many of which are allergic in nature. Often, attachment may provoke little or no response and the patient may be unaware of the presence of a tick for some days until eventually minor itching leads to its discovery. Conversely, there is sometimes a locally heightened sensitivity or hyperaesthesia. Such attachment sites are surrounded by redness.

After the tick is removed itching may recur at the site of attachment at intervals over some weeks, and a small firm lump usually forms within a day or so of the tick's removal. This again may persist for many weeks. There may be some discoloration of the area of the bite. In other cases the skin reactions may be severe with marked itching and considerable redness, swelling and induration. People also report headaches.

=== Food allergy ===
An association between tick bite reactions and mammalian meat allergy in humans has also been reported. The induced allergy is unusual in that the onset of the allergic reaction, which ranges from mild stomach symptoms to life-threatening anaphylaxis (skin rashes, swollen tongue and serious drop in blood pressure), can occur up to 3 to 6 hours after eating mammalian meat (typically beef, lamb or pork) and often many months after the tick bite.

All mammals except humans and certain apes have a carbohydrate commonly known as alpha-gal (galactose-α-1,3-galactose) in their tissue fluids. When a tick feeds on the blood of a mammal (bandicoot, possum, cat, dog etc.) it takes alpha-gal into the tick's digestive system. When the same tick attaches to the next host (e.g., a human) it transfers the alpha-gal to the tissues of that next host. The immune system of some humans recognises alpha-gal as foreign and so produces antibodies against it. In this case the antibody produced is IgE, which is the type of antibody responsible for most allergic reactions. Thus the human is primed for a delayed allergic reaction to subsequent ingestion of mammalian meats (but not chicken or fish).

Alpha-gal allergy in a human can now be recognised through a blood test. The reaction to alpha-gal is distinct from any immediate allergic reaction to the tick itself, which is provoked by proteins in the tick's saliva, not the carbohydrate alpha-gal. People who have such allergic reactions, however, may have a greater predisposition to also developing the allergy to mammalian meats over the next several months.

== Tick paralysis ==
=== Toxins ===
It is thought the toxins of Ixodes holocyclus cause a failure of secretion of neurotransmitter acetylcholine at neuromuscular junctions. In experiments where nerve–muscle preparations were incubated in solution containing toxin, the paralysis effect was delayed for six to seven hours after the addition of toxin. As in live test animals, this effect was temperature dependent, paralysis being more rapid at higher temperatures. Live mice injected with toxin did not develop signs of paralysis for some 8 to 12 hours after the injection. The cause of the delayed toxicity is unknown.

Several toxic fractions have been isolated from the salivary glands of Ixodes holocyclus, but there has been variation in the reported molecular size of the principal paralysing toxin or toxins. Early work suggested that the most neurotoxic fraction was a protein (molecular weight 40–60 kilodaltons, stable when freeze dried, originally named holocyclotoxin). Another toxin was found to be lethal but non-paralysing.

A more recent study isolated three low-molecular-weight toxins, all three of which were able to cause hind limb paralysis in baby mice. Only one, however, could be isolated in quantities permitting further research. The molecule was relatively small at 6 kilodaltons, corresponding to a protein of approximately 50 amino acids like those in scorpion and spider toxins.

The benefit conferred by the paralysing toxin is not clear. Being arachnids, ticks are related to predatory arthropods (spiders, scorpions and mites). Spiders and scorpions have retained toxins and developed specialised delivery structures (fangs and telsons) while mites and ticks have lost this feature. Of the 800 species of ticks, only 40–64 species (across 10 genera) have been reported as causing some form of toxicosis. As ticks have moved from a predatory existence to a parasitic existence, most species have lost their toxin, which would have been a disadvantage for a parasitic lifestyle (parasites in general do not benefit from killing their hosts). The gene sequence of the tick toxin shows high homology to scorpion toxins.

The saliva of Ixodes holocyclus also contains an anti-coagulant.

=== Pets ===
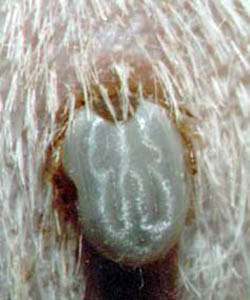
Moderately engorged Ixodes holocyclus attached to a severely paralysed dog. Whilst reactive swelling around the tick can make it appear as though it is penetrating deeper, only the mouthparts penetrate the epidermis of the skin. Even when the tick has fallen off or been removed, there is usually a readily palpable skin lump remaining for days to weeks.

Dogs and cats on the east coast of Australia commonly succumb to the tick paralysis caused by Ixodes holocyclus. A similar tick species, Ixodes cornuatus, appears to cause paralysis in Tasmania. The paralyzing toxin (or toxins) is produced in the salivary glands and injected as part of the feeding process.

The adult female tick is usually attached for a minimum of 3 days before the very earliest signs are noticed although a very observant person might begin to notice a slight change in behavior after 48 hours of attachment (in a warm climate). Typically, however, a person would not notice obvious signs until at least the 4th day of attachment. In colder weather the feeding process is slowed considerably and some animals may not show significant signs of paralysis for as long as two weeks. Furthermore, dogs rarely show significant signs until the adult female has engorged to a width of at least 4 mm (measured at the level of the spiracles; see photo of lateral view of Ixodes holocyclus).

Left untreated, the outcome is often, if not usually, fatal. The toxin or toxins paralyze muscle tissue; in particular:

- Skeletal muscles. This results in the overt paralysis for which the tick is named. Typically the paralysis starts in the hind limbs and subsequently ascends to affect the fore limbs and then the axial muscles.
- Respiratory muscles. Initially this results in rapid, shallow breathing with an inability to cough. In advanced stages it is associated with a slower, exaggerated breathing pattern.
- Laryngeal muscles. This results in an altered 'voice' and an increased risk of aspiration pneumonia (inhalation of food, saliva or vomit into the lungs). Aspiration pneumonia in this situation results in labored breathing with a distinctively foul breath.
- Oesophageal muscle. This results in drooling and regurgitation. It increases the risks of choking and aspiration pneumonia. Megaoesophagus is commonly recognized in dogs and may be diagnosed on thoracic X-rays.
- Heart muscle. This results in congestive heart failure and pulmonary oedema, seen also as labored breathing.

Spring is the peak season for tick paralysis because this is when the ticks molt and develop into the final adult stage of their life cycle; it is the adult stage that also produces the most toxins during feeding. Sporadic cases of tick paralysis, however, can occur all year, even in mid-winter.

Once attached, the female draws blood and gradually swells. In typical warmer weather conditions the initial engorgement is slow, but after four or more days it becomes very rapid. The rapid engorgement phase is also associated with the greatest injection of the toxic saliva.

The dog or cat may show a great variety of signs that may be very subtle in the early stages. Early signs include lethargy, loss of appetite, apparent groaning when lifted, altered voice (bark or meow), noisy panting, coughing, drooling of saliva, gagging, regurgitation (dogs) and enlarged pupils (cats). Occasionally a single limb may appear to be weak or lame. A tick attached to the side of the face may cause loss of blink reflex, corneal ulceration and a discharge from the eye. A tick attached near the anus can cause anal incontinence.

As toxicity progresses the combination of signs becomes more characteristic of tick envenomation. There is progressive limb weakness which is seen first in the hind legs. A dog may appear to walk as though 'drunken' (ataxic). There may be an inability to climb stairs or an inability to turn in tight circles without stumbling. Respiration may become slower and have a grunt at the end of the expiration. Some animals are easily panicked at this stage and should be handled calmly (especially cats).

Ultimately paralysis becomes so severe that an animal is unable to stand or even lift its head. The breathing becomes slow, exaggerated and gasping. A foul odor on the breath can signal aspiration pneumonia. Although pain is not regarded as being a feature of tick paralysis, animals appear to be in severe distress. Finally, the mucous membranes develop a bluish hue (cyanosis) and a state of coma indicates that death is imminent.

After the tick is removed, the signs usually continue to worsen for up to 48 hours, though worsening is usually most pronounced in the first 12–24 hours after removal.

The primary treatment for tick paralysis is the careful administration of anti-tick serum. The effectiveness of anti-tick serum is most dependent on how early it is administered. Early treatment offers the best chance of full recovery. Unlike snake bite, tick envenomation has a relatively slow onset. Despite this slow onset, the fatality rate can be high (even higher than snake bite) if antiserum is not given early enough, before the signs are advanced.

Ancillary treatments may include:

- supporting respiration (ensuring airway patency, providing ventilation, supplying enriched oxygen, treating pulmonary edema, reducing risk of further aspiration, treating any secondary pneumonia)
- minimizing stress and reducing oxygen demand
- maintaining core body temperature
- maintaining hydration and blood pressure (not usually necessary initially)
- protecting eyes if eyelids paralyzed
- assisting urination if unable to urinate

Prevention of tick paralysis is mostly achieved by a combination of daily searching and the use of tick-repelling or tick-killing agents. These may be topical sprays, rinses and collars or systemic oral agents. Some owners clip the fur short to help detect ticks.

Daily searching usually gives a person a few days to find an attached tick. However ticks at the early stage of attachment are small and flat and so easily missed. Whilst most ticks on dogs are found around the head, neck and shoulders, they can be anywhere on the dog's surface. They are easily missed on the face, legs and between the toes. Occasionally they are found inside the lips, ear canals, prepuce or vulva, and anus.

Cats mostly have ticks where they cannot reach to groom themselves—often on the back of the neck or between the shoulder blades, under the chin, on the head, or on the upper leg. Ticks can attach elsewhere, even the tail, hard palate or inside the anus.

Long-haired cats that venture outdoors are more at risk. Matted coats and skin with lumpy lesions also make it more difficult to find ticks. Some veterinarians perform a close clip of the entire coat to help find attached ticks.

The incidence of tick toxicity on cats is unknown, and they may be less susceptible to paralysis than dogs.

Development of a vaccine to protect dogs against the tick toxin has been attempted but has not yet been successful.

=== Horses ===
The number of paralysis ticks required to paralyse a horse is unknown, but in one study there were cases of large horses with only one to two ticks being paralysed and unable to stand. Horses of any age and size can be affected by tick paralysis. In the same study, 26% of the horses died and, of the surviving horses, 35% developed one or more complications including pressure sores, corneal ulcers, pneumonia and sepsis. The relatively high mortality rates in horses in this study could be due to a range of factors, including horses being badly affected before vets are called, difficulties associated with nursing a recumbent horse, difficulties with owners needing to deliver the bulk of nursing care, and lack of information to veterinarians managing the disease in horses.

== Tick removal ==
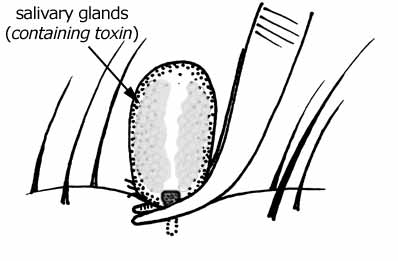
Tick removal. Compressing the body of the tick could cause more noxious substance (allergens, salivary toxins and infectious micro-organisms) to be injected into the host.

Debate around the best method of tick removal is based around two main concerns. The first is that the method of removal could cause further injection of noxious substances (allergens, paralysing toxins and infectious micro-organisms). The second is that the method may leave the 'head' (the tick's mouthparts) embedded in the skin.

The tick's salivary glands and gut contents are together the main source of the noxious substances, and these are located in the main body of the tick. It is thought that any irritation of the tick might cause it to either inject saliva or regurgitate gut contents or that any compression the body of the tick might squeeze saliva and gut contents into the host.

Application of methylated spirit, nail polish remover, turpentine or tea-tree oil is thought to irritate the tick and make it inject more of the noxious substances. Spreading butter or oil over the tick is no longer recommended either. Application of pyrethrin (or pyrethroid) insecticides has been suggested 'as a narcotic and a toxicant, which prevents the tick from injecting its saliva' but with this method the tick may remain physically attached for 24 hrs before it drops off dead. Do not use pyrethrin-containing products on cats as they are toxic to felines.

Leaving the mouthparts embedded in the skin is usually of lesser concern. If left embedded, the mouthparts cause a foreign body reaction and are usually eventually sloughed like a splinter. It has been noted that, when Ixodes holocyclus is forcibly extracted, the feeding tube (the hypostome) is usually damaged, which suggests that part of its tip remains embedded in the skin.

In sensitive areas of the body (e.g., the eyelids), touching the tick can make its presence become suddenly painful.

Before removal

- If a person has difficulty removing a tick, or has reason to be concerned about allergic reactions, it is best to seek professional medical attention. The process of removing ticks in humans has been associated with anaphylactic reactions, and so it is best to have appropriate medical supplies (oxygen, adrenaline) ready.
- Instruct children to seek adult help for proper tick removal
- Wear thin disposable gloves if available
- Avoid unnecessary touching of the tick's body

If freezing ether-spray is available

- For adult ticks, freezing them with an ether-containing spray (available at pharmacies and used for warts) is recommended for humans.
- Once killed, they can either be carefully removed (without squeezing the body) or allowed to drop off.

If freezing ether-spray is not available

- Grasp the tick's mouthparts as close to the skin as possible using fine, curved forceps, but avoid squeezing the body. Normal household tweezers are not recommended; they are too coarse and will squeeze the tick, injecting more of its contents into the body.
- Grasp very firmly; the long feeding tube of Ixodes holocyclus is deeply embedded and has reverse barbs

Other methods of grasping the tick

- A specialised tick removal tool. Tools include tick hooks, tick scoops, tick tweezers, and tick loops. These are usually inexpensive and often used in areas where ticks are prevalent.
- A loop of thread. This can sometimes be difficult to place without disturbing the tick.
- Monofilament fishing line. This method showed a high success rate, though on a limited cohort.

After removal

- Apply antiseptic to the bite site and disinfect the tick removal instrument
- Save the tick in a small airtight container with moist paper or a leaf or blade of grass. Label with the date removed and the locality where the tick was acquired. The tick can be identified later if the victim of the tick bite develops illness, especially in the following 4 weeks. (Note that an engorged female will deposit eggs within a few weeks and these will hatch into thousands of larvae which can escape the container if it is not properly sealed.)
- Look for more ticks (both on humans and on pets)

Removing larval ticks

- Larval ticks are usually present in large numbers
- For larval and nymph stage ticks, use permethrin cream (available at pharmacies).
- It has also been considered safe to soak for 30 minutes in a bath to which 1 cup (~240 mL) of sodium bicarbonate has been added, then scrape off the dead larvae.

== Zoonotic infections ==
Several bacterial diseases are spread by Ixodes holocyclus. As yet no viral or protozoal diseases associated with this vector are known.

Vector competence for hard (ixodid) ticks is believed to require that the microorganism be able to replicate within the tick. These ticks tend to not take multiple blood meals from different hosts in one stage, and passing an organism between tick stages (trans-stadial transmission) seemingly requires that an organism be able to propagate as the tick matures.

=== Spotted fevers ===
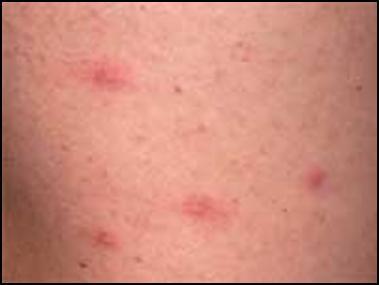
Rickettsial spotted fever caused by Rickettsia australis can be mistaken for chicken pox.

Ixodes holocyclus is the main vector for rickettsial spotted fever (also known as Queensland tick typhus) (causative organism Rickettsia australis) and Flinders Island spotted fever (causative organism Rickettsia honei). Rickettsia australis is an obligate intracellular bacterial parasite that proliferates within the endothelial cells of small blood vessels, causing a vasculitis. Spotted fever is probably more common than the tick-borne Lyme-like disease found in Australia. Sometimes infection with Rickettsia australis occurs without a rash; there may just be a high fever. Usually (in 65% of cases) there is a black spot (known as an eschar, usually 2–5 mm in diameter) at the site of the tick bite. This looks like a scab with redness and swelling around it. Usually there is only one eschar unless there has been more than one tick bite. Often lymph glands nearby are enlarged and painful. Fever starts 1–14 days (usually 7–10 days) after the tick bite, followed within a few days by a rash. The rash can look like chicken pox as the spots may contain some fluid. Other symptoms include headache, stiff neck, nausea, vomiting, mental confusion, and aching muscles and joints. The illness may be more severe in adults and elderly persons. Spotted fever is diagnosed by two blood tests (immunoglobulin M and Weil-Felix tests) taken 10 days apart. PCR analysis of skin biopsies is a more recent testing method. The disease runs its course in two weeks or so but can be cured more quickly with tetracycline antibiotics. As antibiotic treatment is very effective, many persons feel so well that they do not return to have the second blood sample collected. But this second blood test is important as it is the only way of proving the diagnosis of spotted fever. Spotted fever rarely, if ever, occurs more than once because someone infected once usually becomes immune for life. In rare instances there may be a repeated infection after recovery; it is not known whether this is caused by another strain. It is also presently unknown whether chronic infections occur. The disease is rarely fatal. Australian spotted fever was first described in 1946 when 12 soldiers contracted the disease during training exercises in north Queensland; it was at that time known as Queensland tick typhus. Infections generally arise in rural areas, but 10% of reported cases appear to have been acquired in cities. It is commonly seen in tick collectors in southern Queensland. It mostly occurs during the winter and spring, but can occur at any time in temperate areas.

=== Q fever ===
Ixodes holocyclus is also commonly mentioned as a potential vector of Q fever (Coxiella burnetii). The ornate kangaroo tick (wallaby tick) Amblyomma triguttatum has also been implicated in Q fever.

=== Lyme-like spirochaetal disease in Australia ===
Erythema migrans, bullseye or target lesion—typical of Lyme disease but not always present

Lyme disease was first described in Europe in 1883 and in the 1970s in North America. It is an illness caused by a spiral-shaped bacterium called a spirochaete. The best-known culprit is Borrelia burgdorferi, but many different Borrelia species cause Lyme disease worldwide. An Australian spirochaete has not been found in humans yet, and may be quite different from Borrelia burgdorferi. Despite clinical case reports, it is still controversial as to whether Lyme disease occurs in Australia. Some doctors and health authorities believe it does, while others are adamant that it does not. Until the controversy is resolved, patients with suspected Lyme-like disease should be treated with an appropriate course of antibiotics because early treatment of Lyme disease invariably results in a complete cure.

Some vector competence studies have been undertaken on Ixodes holocyclus with respect to the Lyme disease pathogen Borrelia burgdorferi sensu stricto (a United States strain). These suggested that the tick can not transmit this strain of spirochaete. Despite this, there is a strong belief that some kind of Lyme-like spirochaete causes a Lyme-like disease in Australia and that it is carried by Ixodes holocyclus. At the Royal North Shore Hospital in Sydney the Tick-borne Diseases Research Unit continues its study into this issue. Cases of Lyme-like disease are being diagnosed on the basis of clinical signs (often musculoskeletal, chronic fatigue, neurological and dermatological), exclusion of other infections, serology (which is supportive but not conclusive), and response to antibiotic treatment. Initially, antibiotics may cause a worsening of symptoms (the Herxheimer reaction), as spirochaetes are destroyed, which in part supports the diagnosis.

This putative Australian form of Lyme-like borreliosis is associated with a different clinical picture from true Lyme disease of North America.

==== Skin lesions of Lyme-like disease. ====
Early symptoms in the first four weeks after a tick bite include a rash or red patch that gradually expands over several days. It may get quite large (up to 50 mm or more in diameter). This rash is called erythema migrans or EM. It can be difficult to distinguish from an allergic reaction at the site of the bite. Allergic rashes usually occur within 48 hours of the bite, then fade. EM usually first appears after a delay of 48 hours following the tick bite and gets bigger over a few days or weeks. As it expands, the EM rash often has a 'target' or 'bullseye' appearance, clearing in the middle with a more obvious red edge. EM can persist for months or years, coming and going in that time. Sometimes many small EM rashes occur. EM may occur in as few as 20% of persons with Lyme disease.

==== Other body systems affected by Lyme-like disease. ====
More common than EM are symptoms due to invasion by the spirochaete of the nervous system, heart, muscles and joints. These may start weeks or months after the tick bite. Initially, they may include flu-like illness, fever, headache, sore throat, fatigue, aching muscles and joints. More serious are meningitis, Bell's palsy (weakness of the face muscles), swelling of joints, and heart problems with palpitations and breathlessness. Lyme disease is difficult to distinguish from many other illnesses, such as chronic fatigue syndrome, because the symptoms may be similar. If a patient has symptoms that could be Lyme disease, even if no tick bite was ever noticed, it is important to see a doctor. Diagnosis is helped by a blood test called a western blot test, but a doctor may do other tests to determine whether any other illness could be causing the symptoms.

==== Treatment of Lyme-like disease. ====
Early treatment with antibiotics is important to prevent more serious problems. Pregnant women bitten by a tick should see a doctor. Some data suggests that Lyme disease can affect the foetus, but two large studies in the US and Europe showed no increased risk of adverse effects on the foetus.

== See also ==
- Ticks of domestic animals
