= Alpha-gal syndrome =

Acquired allergy resulting from tick bites

- Other names: Alpha-gal syndrome (AGS); Acquired red meat allergy Mammalian meat allergy (MMA)
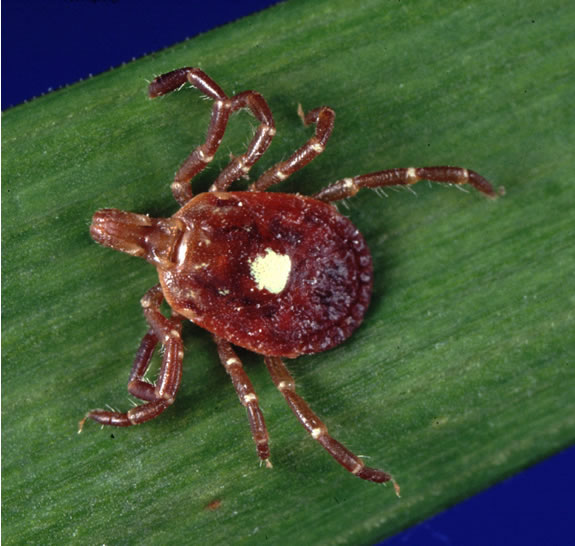
- Amblyomma americanum, a tick vector for AGS
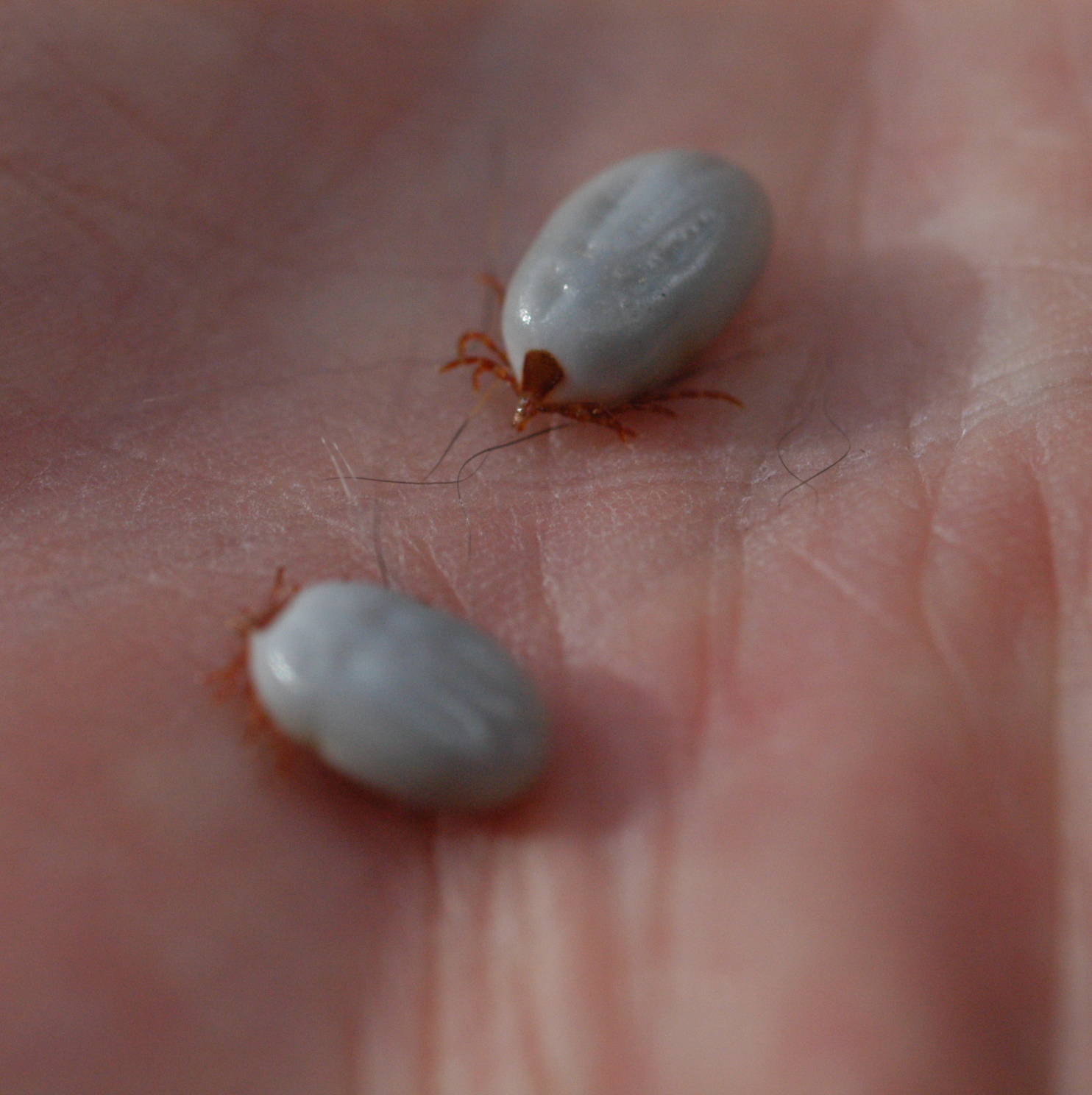
- Ixodes holocyclus, a tick vector for AGS
- Specialty: Allergy, immunology
- Symptoms: Abdominal pain, anaphylaxis, angiodema, difficulty breathing, drop in blood pressure, dizziness or faintness, headaches, heart attack, congestion, diarrhea, faintness, hives, nausea, rhinorrhea, sneezing, vomiting
- Usual onset: Immediate or delayed reactions
- Duration: Long-term
- Causes: Bites from certain species of ticks
- Diagnostic method: Clinical diagnosis, blood tests
- Differential diagnosis: Pork-cat syndrome
- Prevention: Avoidance of tick bites
- Management: Avoidance of additional tick bites, avoidance of alpha-gal exposure, desensitization
- Medication: Anti-histamines, epinephrine
- Prognosis: May require lifelong management
- Prevalence: Unknown, varies by region
- Deaths: Unknown

Alpha-gal syndrome (AGS), also known as alpha-gal allergy or mammalian meat allergy (MMA), is an acquired allergy to the epitope of the carbohydrate molecule galactose-alpha-1,3-galactose ("alpha-gal"). Reactions can be life-threatening, and typically either begin rapidly after exposure from intravenous therapy, or 2–8 hours after ingesting foods and medicines. Reactions can also occur from skin contact and environmental exposures. AGS results from tick bites, and possibly bites from other parasites.

Alpha-gal is present in all foods and ingredients made from beef, pork, lamb, venison, rabbit, and other mammal sources, including gelatin and milk. Certain seaweeds also contain alpha-gal. Alpha-gal is found worldwide among the inactive ingredients and materials of medications and healthcare products, and it is generally not required to be labeled. Reactions have been reported from breathing cooking fumes containing alpha-gal molecules, and from contact with health and personal care products. AGS patients may have a reaction near farm animals, and shoveling manure or other chores may require gloves or a respirator.

== Signs and symptoms ==
Reactions have been documented from intravenous medication, foods and medicines, skin contact, and environmental exposures.

Allergic symptoms vary greatly between individuals and include rash, hives, nausea or vomiting, difficulty breathing, drop in blood pressure, dizziness, diarrhea, severe stomach pain, anaphylaxis, heart attack, and death.

=== Reactions to intravenous treatments ===
Reactions to intravenous exposure, such as infusions and transfusions, are typically rapid. The cancer treatment cetuximab, gelatin-based plasma volume expanders, and certain antivenoms are forms of intravenous treatment that have been identified as particularly risky for patients with alpha-gal syndrome.

=== Reactions to foods and medicines ===
Anaphylaxis is a potential life-threatening reaction to the allergy.

Reactions to alpha-gal in food or medicine typically have a delayed onset, beginning 2–8 hours after consumption. After the delayed onset, the allergic response is like most IgE-mediated food allergies, including severe whole-body itching, hives, angioedema, gastrointestinal upset, and possible anaphylaxis. Anaphylactic reactions are seen in approximately 60% of afflicted individuals.

Some cases feature gastrointestinal (GI) symptoms without pruritus, hives, or other skin involvement. This presentation is not typical of food allergies, which can make the initial suspicion of alpha-gal syndrome less likely. It can lead to misdiagnosis of irritable bowel syndrome. American guidelines published in 2023 recommended physicians suspect alpha-gal syndrome in cases with abdominal pain and GI symptoms, but without traditional allergy symptoms like hives. In 70% of cases, the reaction is accompanied by respiratory distress and is particularly harmful to those with asthma.

The severity of reaction to alpha-gal has been found to correlate with the amount of alpha-gal in the ingested food or drug. However, for many patients, not every exposure to alpha-gal results in an allergic reaction. Symptoms and sensitivity to reactions vary greatly among individuals. Other factors, including exercise and alcohol consumption, can affect an individual's symptoms and reactivity to alpha-gal.

== Prevalence ==
Alpha-gal allergy has been reported in 30 countries on all six continents where humans are bitten by ticks, particularly the United States and Australia. Prevalence can be correlated to populations of tick species that have been documented as carriers, such as the lone star tick (Amblyomma americanum) in the US and the paralysis tick (Ixodes holocyclus) in Australia. Alpha-gal has also been shown to exist in the saliva of Ixodes scapularis but not Amblyomma maculatum.

=== Availability of prevalence data ===
In the United States, data on AGS prevalence is limited because positive blood test results and clinical diagnoses are not required to be reported in federal public health statistics. AGS is only a mandatory reportable condition for statistics in some US states. In September 2023, Arkansas became the first US state to make alpha-gal syndrome a reportable condition. As of June 2026, thirteen states track positive tests.

=== Australia ===
In November 2019, Australia had the highest rate of alpha-gal syndrome and tick paralysis worldwide.

=== United States ===
From 2010 to the end of 2022, over 100,000 cases of AGS were diagnosed by a laboratory in the United States. The Centers for Disease Control and Prevention's national estimate of cases totaled 450,000 at that time. The CDC report indicated that those numbers were likely an underestimate because AGS is neither nationally "reportable" nor mandated as reportable in all states, and also because many medical providers remain unfamiliar with AGS.

In a 2010–2018 study, more than 34,000 suspected cases of AGS were identified. After that period, the annual number of positive test results increased from 13,371 in 2017 to 18,885 in 2021. Virginia reported 14,000 positive cases from September 2025 to June 2026, ten times its rate of Lyme disease.

In the US, AGS is more prevalent in the central and southern regions, which corresponds to the distribution of the lone star tick. In the Southern United States, where the tick is most prevalent, allergy rates are 32% higher than elsewhere. 2012 research identified unexpectedly high rates of alpha-gal syndrome in certain western and north-central areas of the US. This suggests that another tick species may spread the allergy. The study also found alpha-gal syndrome cases in Hawaii, where no ticks associated with AGS are found.

== Prognosis ==
Alpha-gal syndrome is a long-term condition for which there is no cure. AGS can be fatal. AGS disproportionately affects people in their 40s and 50s when the human body begins to lose cardiac resilience. 30–40% of AGS patients have cardiac symptoms during reactions.

Management typically requires ongoing access to a medical provider and avoidance of the alpha-gal molecule epitope. Symptoms may lessen or resolve over time for some AGS patients. For some people, the allergy improves after avoiding further tick bites over a time period from 8 months to 5 years.

== Treatment ==
In addition to avoiding triggers, treatment aims to alleviate symptoms and is dependent on severity. If an individual with mild symptoms consumes food containing alpha-gal, then treatment with over-the-counter antihistamines may be acceptable. More severe reactions—like anaphylaxis—can require admission to a hospital for emergency treatment. In these situations, treatment is the same as for any anaphylactic reaction, such as epinephrine administration.

=== Desensitization ===
Desensitization involves the gradual introduction of increasing amounts of mammalian meat under medical supervision. The process is experimental and requires extended monitoring due to the risk of delayed anaphylaxis.

Successful oral desensitization for alpha-gal syndrome has been reported in multiple cases including two adults in 2017, a pediatric case in 2019, an adult in 2023, and a 63-year-old in 2024.

== Deaths ==
More than 10 deaths have been attributed to alpha-gal reactions to medications.

=== Availability of mortality data ===
There is no estimate of the number or rate of deaths due to alpha-gal syndrome. Awareness among healthcare providers remains limited, and AGS often goes undiagnosed, leading to AGS deaths not being reflected in public health data. Patients with life-threatening AGS symptoms often remain undiagnosed even after emergency department visits. One study in North Carolina evaluated more than 100 medical encounters with AGS patients, including 28 emergency department visits and 2 urgent care visits. The correct AGS diagnosis or an effective diagnosis referral occurred less than 10% of the time.

=== Reactions to intravenous treatments ===
In 2006, a patient in the United States died from an anaphylactic reaction following an infusion of cetuximab.

In 2010–12, a paper proposed that approximately 8 deaths could be attributed to anaphylactic reactions to cetuximab across Italy and France, with one additional death being reported but unpublished in the medical data. "Environmental factors, such as bites by ectoparasitic ticks, probably explain the heterogeneous ... incidence of anaphylactic reactions to cetuximab among studies and geographic areas."

In 2021, a forensic investigation confirmed that a fatal reaction to cetuximab in South Korea was due to alpha-gal syndrome.

A review from Australia connected anaphylactic reactions as a result of cetuximab administration to alpha-gal syndrome, noting that there had been two fatal cases before July 2022. In 2023, AGS experts Sheryl van Nunen and Melanie Burk reported that 3 deaths from cetuximab-triggered AGS reactions had occurred in Australia that year, and 8 in the rest of the world, totaling 11 deaths.

A case report from Washington DC documented three alpha-gal reactions in 2022 and 2023 to type B blood transfused to a type O patient, including one death from Transfusion Related Alpha-Gal-Syndrome (TRAGS). AGS may have caused the death of a Kansas woman in 2025 after heart surgery.

=== Reactions to food ingredients ===
The earliest known forensically documented fatal case of AGS from consuming mammal food products occurred in Australia in 2022. In November 2025, researchers at the University of Virginia School of Medicine described another fatal allergic reaction due to undiagnosed alpha-gal syndrome that occurred the previous summer. The cause was determined post-mortem because the deceased's family requested an investigation. AGS may have caused the reaction that killed a person in the United States in 2023 from an anaphylactic reaction to beef. One expert noted in 2025 that there were additional unreported deaths from food reactions.

== Sources of alpha-gal epitope ==
Galactose-alpha-1,3-galactose, or alpha-gal, is a carbohydrate molecule found widely in natural and manufactured substances.

=== Foods ===
Alpha-gal is a natural component of food ingredients made from mammals such as beef, pork, lamb, venison, rabbit, gelatin, and milk. Individuals with an alpha-gal allergy may still consume reptile meats, insects, poultry, and seafood that naturally do not contain alpha-gal.

The alpha-gal molecule can also be found in certain seaweeds. Carrageenan is the name for a group of linear sulfated polysaccharides that are extracted from red algae, or red seaweed. Carrageenan contains the alpha-gal epitope that some people with alpha-gal syndrome react to. Carrageenan is used for gelling, thickening, and stabilizing, as well as for clarifying beer, juice, and wine. Carrageenan is also sprayed on fruit and vegetables, and applied to fish to help them retain water. It can also be found in medications, medical products, personal care, and household products.

Some alpha-gal reactions attributed to dairy may instead be to carrageenan. Common names for carrageenan include: PES Irish Moss, Vegetable Gelatin, Norsk Gelatin, Danish Agar, Carastay, Eucheuma spinosum gum, and red seaweed extract.

=== Medication and medical products ===
Many medications incorporate alpha-gal molecules in inactive ingredients sourced from cows, pigs or other mammal sources that are often used as excipients or stabilizers, such as gelatin, lactose, glycerin, magnesium stearate, and polysorbates. A 2023 report found that more than 50% of AGS patients who reacted to medications experienced systemic or anaphylactic-type reactions. AGS can induce life-threatening intolerance to medical products including medicines, vaccines, antivenoms, infant formula, sutures, contact lenses, tattoo inks, and glycerin-based soaps and surfactants. Alpha-gal is found widely among nonsteroidal anti-inflammatory drugs, analgesics, and other common drugs.

Biologic therapies such as cetuximab and ustekinumab have been associated with allergic responses among alpha-gal syndrome patients. Other injectable drugs, including some vaccines and monoclonal antibodies, as well as medical products like surgical sutures or hemostatic agents, also incorporate alpha-gal.

Blood thinners derived from porcine intestine and replacement heart valves derived from porcine tissue may also contain alpha-gal. Alpha-gal is found on the fragment-antigen binding (Fab) region of the recombinant monoclonal cetuximab antibody used in the immunotherapy treatment of metastatic colon cancer. Immediate hypersensitivities and reactions, specifically concentrated in the southern part of the United States, can be seen from the alpha-gal components of this anti-cancer drug. Increasing evidence now suggests reactions to certain substances with traces of alpha-gal used in the preparation of certain medications, including nonsteroidal anti-inflammatory drugs (NSAIDs) and other analgesics and pain medications.

Anaphylactic transfusion reactions have been reported in patients with presumed alpha-gal syndrome who had type O blood and received group B plasma or platelets. The B blood group antigen is antigenically similar to Galactose-alpha-1,3-Galactose.

For those undergoing surgery, possible triggering agents include porcine-derived heart valves, insulin, heparin, thrombin, and Surgifoam powder.

Skin contact to products like adhesive bandages and topical antibiotics that contain the alpha-gal epitope can also lead to AGS reactions.

Use of a resource like Pill Clarity may assist healthcare providers and patients in identifying medications that do not contain mammal-derived ingredients. Due to limited transparency around excipient sourcing in drug labeling, some experts recommend that individuals with AGS consult allergists and, when needed, contact pharmaceutical manufacturers directly for ingredient information.

=== Environmental exposure ===
Alpha-gal reactions have been reported from breathing cooking fumes containing alpha-gal molecules, farm chores near domesticated mammals, and skin contact with health and personal care products. Farmers with AGS have reported needing to use gloves in order to safely handle mammal livestock.

== Cause and mechanism ==
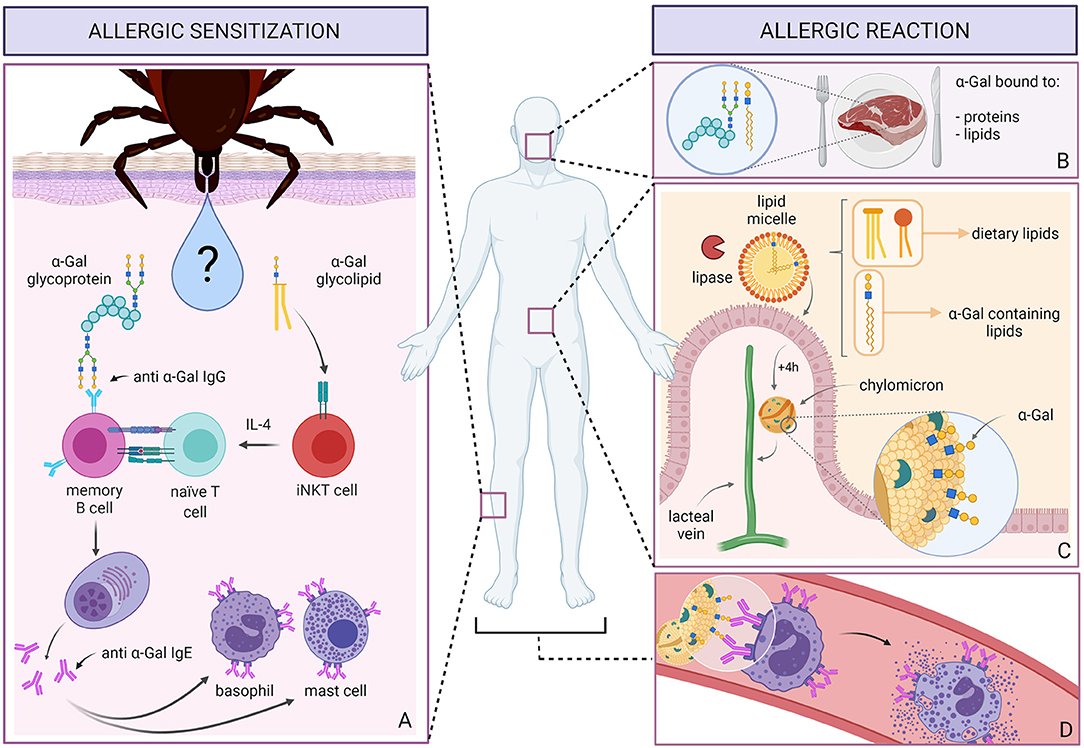
Allergic sensitization to α-Gal.

Alpha-gal allergies are the first known food-related allergies associated with a carbohydrate rather than a protein, and the first known to present the possibility of delayed-onset anaphylaxis.

During alpha-gal reactions the body is overloaded with immunoglobulin E (IgE) antibodies. Anti-gal is a human natural antibody that interacts specifically with the mammalian carbohydrate structure Galα1-3Galβ1-4GlcNAc-R (the alpha-galactosyl epitope).

The alpha-gal molecule is naturally found in the bodies of all mammal species except catarrhines (apes and Old World monkeys), the taxonomic branch that includes humans. Alpha-gal can also be found in the saliva of insects, including certain tick species. For humans, type B or type AB blood may confer some protection, as the type B blood antigen is similar to the alpha-gal molecule.

Alpha-gal allergies develop after a person has been bitten by the lone star tick (Amblyomma americanum) or the black-legged tick (Ixodes scapularis) in the United States, the European castor bean tick, the paralysis tick or Ixodes (Endopalpiger) australiensis in Australia, Haemaphysalis longicornis in Japan, or a currently unknown tick in South Africa, possibly Amblyomma hebraeum.

The role of lone star tick bites in causing alpha-gal syndrome has been confirmed using an alpha-gal knockout mouse model. This tick is established in the southeastern US, but has been reported from many additional areas.

Tick larvae, nymphs, and adults can cause AGS. Tick larvae are tiny and often mistaken for chiggers when hundreds bite a person at once. There are also reports of AGS cases from true chiggers, mites, fleas, and hookworms.

The tick injects the alpha-gal into a person's skin with its bite. Recent research has shown that saliva from the lone star tick contains alpha-gal, and that saliva is injected into the bloodstream. Researchers still do not know which specific component of tick saliva causes the reaction. The immune system then releases a flood of IgE antibodies to fight this foreign sugar. After this reaction, the future intake of mammal meat with the same alpha-gal causes an allergic reaction.

Symptoms of the allergy reaction are caused by too many IgE antibodies attacking the allergen, namely the alpha-gal. Other types of ticks are suspected of causing similar problems. Only a small percentage of people—whether children or adults—will acquire a red meat allergy after receiving a bite from a lone star tick.

== Diagnosis ==
Diagnosis begins with suspicion of alpha-gal syndrome after a thorough review of an individual's medical history and clinical symptoms. Research has shown that in the US it takes on average more than seven years from time of symptom onset to receive a correct diagnosis. Regarding laboratory testing, diagnosis tends to be difficult, and no specific test is recommended over others.

A blood test for the specific IgE antibody to the alpha-gal carbohydrate is commonly used for diagnosis in clinical practice. Typically, a level of 1% for IgE specific for alpha-gal out of total IgE has been identified in patients with alpha-gal syndrome. Traditional skin-prick allergy tests for allergy to meat may give a false-negative answer and are not generally considered reliable. Skin and basophil activation tests with cetuximab are the most sensitive, but high costs limit their use.

In certain instances in which a person does not present with the typical symptoms and history of alpha-gal syndrome but is found to have elevated alpha-gal IgE levels, improvement with avoidance of red meat can be diagnostic as well.

Alpha-gal allergies are similar to pork–cat syndrome; hence, misidentification can occur. Pork–cat syndrome usually elicits an immediate allergic response, whereas a true alpha-gal allergy typically features a delayed allergic reaction of 3 to 8 hours after ingestion of the allergen.

== Prevention ==
Preventing alpha-gal syndrome means preventing or reducing tick exposure. Tick bites can be prevented by treating clothing and gear with products containing 0.5% permethrin and avoiding areas inhabited by ticks.

=== Tick management ===
In the United States, deer are the primary host of lone star ticks. Dramatic increases in lone star tick populations and geographic range correlate with similar increases in deer populations. Thousands of lone star ticks may infest a single deer. Reducing deer populations has been proposed as a way to manage lone star ticks and therefore reduce rates of alpha-gal syndrome

In Australia, researcher Sheryl Van Nunen concluded that the sudden rise in alpha-gal allergies was the result of a local fox baiting program that began in 2003. Historically, foxes were introduced to Australia and had decimated the local indigenous bandicoot population. However, an unforeseen effect of efforts to reduce the invasive fox population to increase the bandicoot population was a rise in ticks and tick bites, as bandicoots are a major host for ticks.

=== Tick removal ===
Other recommendations are to conduct tick checks after coming inside, remove outdoor clothing, and run them in a dryer on high heat to kill undetected ticks. Taking a shower or bath promptly can help detect ticks on the skin.

Tick removal is best done with forceps or tweezers and pulling straight out is favored over rotation.

== Bioethics ==
In recent years, alpha-gal syndrome has received attention from highly contentious proposals for its use as a biological agent to deliberately force an end to human consumption of animal meat for ethical or environmental purposes. One of the earliest to propose exploring ways to bioengineer a reduction in human meat consumption was S. Matthew Liao, chair of bioethics at NYU, who argued in 2013 that pharmacological meat intolerance is a less risky alternative to large-scale environmental geoengineering to reduce anthropogenic carbon emissions and curb climate change.

In 2018, PETA drew controversy after posting what it called an April Fools' Day joke in which the group announced its intent to release AGS-infected ticks in public parks. In a 2025 article in the journal Bioethics, Crutchfield and Hereth argued that "promoting tickborne AGS is strongly pro tanto obligatory" and should be spread as a "moral bioenhancer" to compel a reduction in human consumption of meat in order to reduce the environmental impacts of the meat industry with a method that rejects anthropocentrism and speciesism.

Most scholars reject these proposals as extreme and unethical, with philosophers and religious scholars warning of the dangers of using consequentialism to ignore informed consent and bodily autonomy, and disability advocates condemning the ethicists framing of infliction of biological impairment as a positive outcome as dehumanizing and ableist. Medical professionals highlight that AGS is not a simple dietary preference, but a life-threatening condition which can induce life-threatening intolerance to other medical products manufactured with mammalian byproducts, including medicines, vaccines, antivenoms, infant formula, sutures, contact lenses, tattoo inks, and glycerin-based soaps and surfactants.

=== Myths and conspiracy theories ===
In 2013, PETA posted an April Fools' Day joke about the benefits of alpha-gal syndrome and the spread of lone star ticks. Claims that this was a serious plan have circulated periodically in the years since.

In 2023, a conspiracy theory connecting alpha-gal syndrome to Gates Foundation tick research was spread on social media.

== History ==
The allergy was first formally identified as originating from tick bites in the United States in 2002 by Thomas Platts-Mills, and independently by Sheryl van Nunen in Australia in 2007.

Platts-Mills, Tina Hatley Merritt, and Scott Commins were attempting to discover why some people were reacting negatively to the cancer drug cetuximab. They had previously hypothesized that a fungal infection or parasite could lead to the allergy.

Thomas Platts-Mills and Scott Commins discovered that these individuals had IgE antibodies for the portion of cetuximab that contained the alpha-gal carbohydrate. When Platts-Mills himself was bitten by a tick and developed alpha-gal allergies, his team concluded that a link existed between tick bites and the allergy. They found that the IgE antibody response to the mammalian oligosaccharide epitope alpha-gal was associated with both the immediate-onset anaphylaxis during first exposure to intravenous cetuximab and the delayed-onset anaphylaxis 3 to 6 hours after ingesting foods with mammal ingredients.

Van Nunen, an immunologist specialising in allergies, had been practicing in a tick-prone area of Sydney, Australia, when 25 patients reported having allergic reactions to red meat after being bitten by ticks. This indicated a sudden rise in this type of allergy, corresponding to an increase in the local bandicoot population due to changes in wildlife management policy.

In 2020, the U.S. Food and Drug Administration approved the genetic modification of pigs that do not produce alpha-gal sugars. Pigs developed with the trademarked name GalSafe may be consumed safely by people with alpha-gal allergy. They may also produce alpha-gal-safe drugs, and their organs can also be used for xenotransplantation.

== See also ==
- Poultry allergy
- Pork–cat syndrome
