= Barry Kay (immunologist) =

British immunologist (1939–2020)

Anthony Barrington "Barry" Kay (1939 – 30 December 2020) was a British immunologist known for his research in asthma and allergy. He was a professor at Imperial College London and a consultant immunologist to Royal Brompton Hospital.

== Early life ==
Kay was born in Northampton in 1939 to Tony Chambers, a manager at a washing machine company, and Eva Gertrude Pearcey, a dressmaker. When he was young, his parents divorced and his mother remarried Harry Kay, a Jewish businessman in London. Barry later described his childhood in a memoir titled, Whatever Happened to Barry Chambers?, where he recalls his transformation from "Barry Chambers" into "Barry Kay". He boarded at The King's (The Cathedral) School and went on to study medicine at the University of Edinburgh, graduating in 1963.

== Career ==
Kay completed house officer posts at Edinburgh City Hospital before pursuing a PhD in immunology at Jesus College, Cambridge. His thesis, titled "Eosinophils and Allergic Tissue Reactions", was supervised by Robin Coombs and completed in 1969. He travelled to the United States for a postdoctoral fellowship at Harvard University before returning to Edinburgh in 1971 as a lecturer in respiratory diseases and later a senior lecturer in clinical pathology. At this time he also served as deputy director of the Scottish National Blood Transfusion Service. In 1980, he moved to London to become Professor of Immunology at Imperial College London and an honorary consultant physician and head of the allergy clinic at Royal Brompton Hospital. He remained in those roles until 2004.

Kay's research demonstrated the key role played by T cells in asthma and allergy. He also investigated the role of eosinophils in airway remodelling and pulmonary fibrosis, and the mechanisms of late-phase allergic reactions. He served as president of the European Academy of Allergy and Clinical Immunology (1989–1992) and the British Society for Allergy & Clinical Immunology (1993–1996). He was co-editor of Clinical & Experimental Allergy from 1984 to 2007. He was elected Fellow of the Academy of Medical Sciences in 1999.

== Personal life ==
Kay married his wife Rosemary (née Johnstone) in 1963, and they had three daughters together. He was a keen musician, playing bassoon in the Hounslow Symphony Orchestra and the Wandsworth Symphony Orchestra, and playing a harpsichord that he had built himself. He died in 2020 from metastatic bladder cancer for which he had undergone chemotherapy and immunotherapy.
