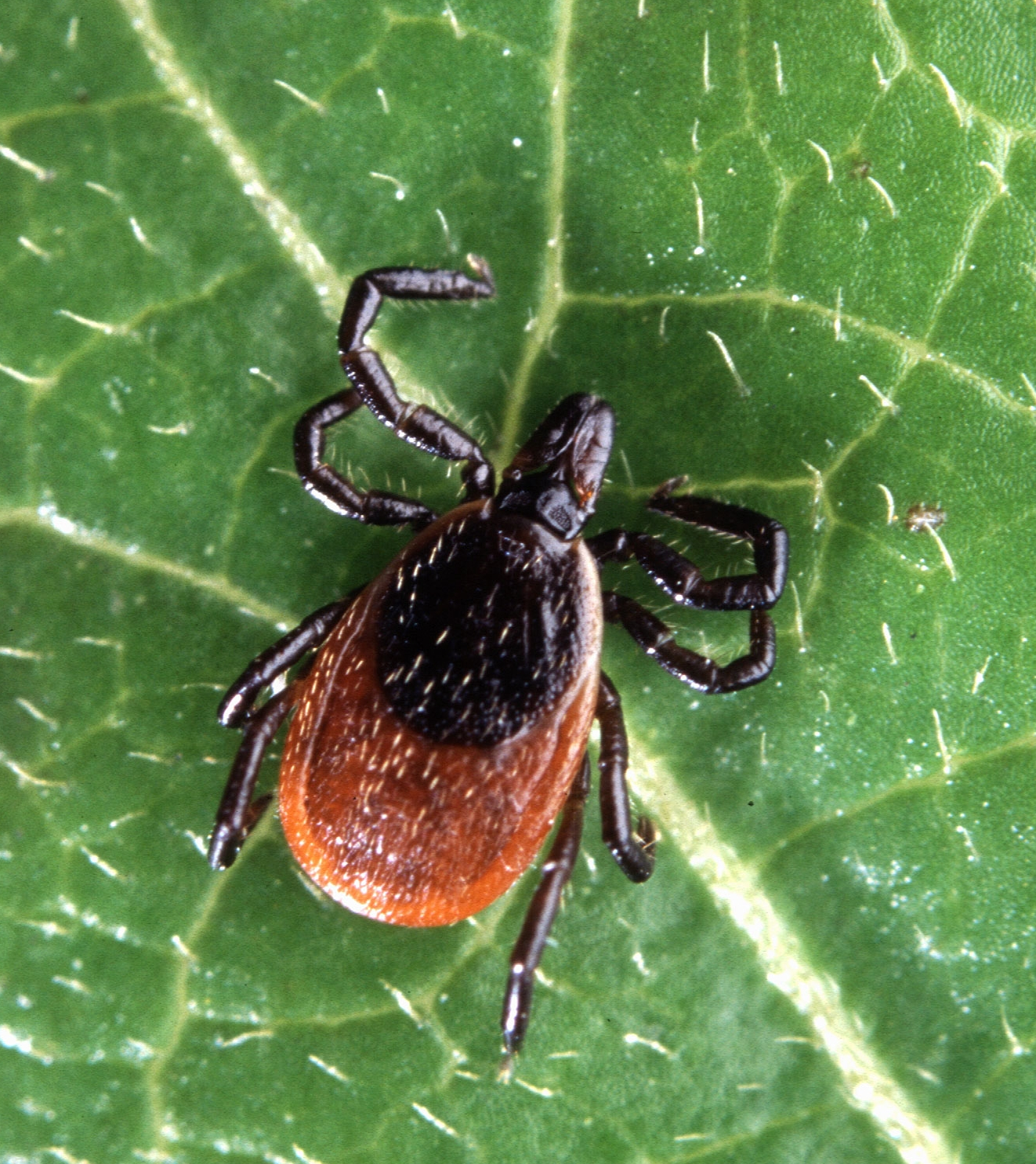
- Adult female black-legged tick

Scientific classification
- Kingdom: Animalia
- Phylum: Arthropoda
- Subphylum: Chelicerata
- Class: Arachnida
- Order: Ixodida
- Family: Ixodidae
- Genus: Ixodes
- Species: I. scapularis

Binomial name
- Ixodes scapularis Say, 1821

Synonyms
- Ixodes dammini Spielman et al., 1979; Ixodes fuscous Say, 1821; Ixodes fuscus Neumann, 1911; Ixodes ozarkus Cooley, 1944; Ixodes reduvius Neumann, 1899; Ixodes ricinus subsp. scapularis Nuttall & Warburton, 1911; Ixodes ricinus var. scapularis Nuttall & Warburton, 1911; Ixodes (Ixodes) scapularis Neumann, 1911

= Ixodes scapularis =

Species of tick

Ixodes scapularis is a hard-bodied tick found in much of the eastern half of North America. Its common name is the black-legged tick, although it is sometimes known by the misnomer deer tick because its adult life stages frequently feed on white-tailed deer. In 1979, ticks found associated with Babesiosis in the northeastern US were given the scientific name Ixodes dammini and the common name deer tick. In 1993, it was shown that Ixodes dammini was the same as a previously identified species, Ixodes scapularis, from the southeastern US, which already had the common name black-legged tick.

The black-legged tick is a vector for several diseases: Lyme disease, babesiosis, anaplasmosis, and Powassan virus disease. It is also known to parasitize mice, lizards, migratory birds, etc. especially while the tick is in the larval or nymphal stage.

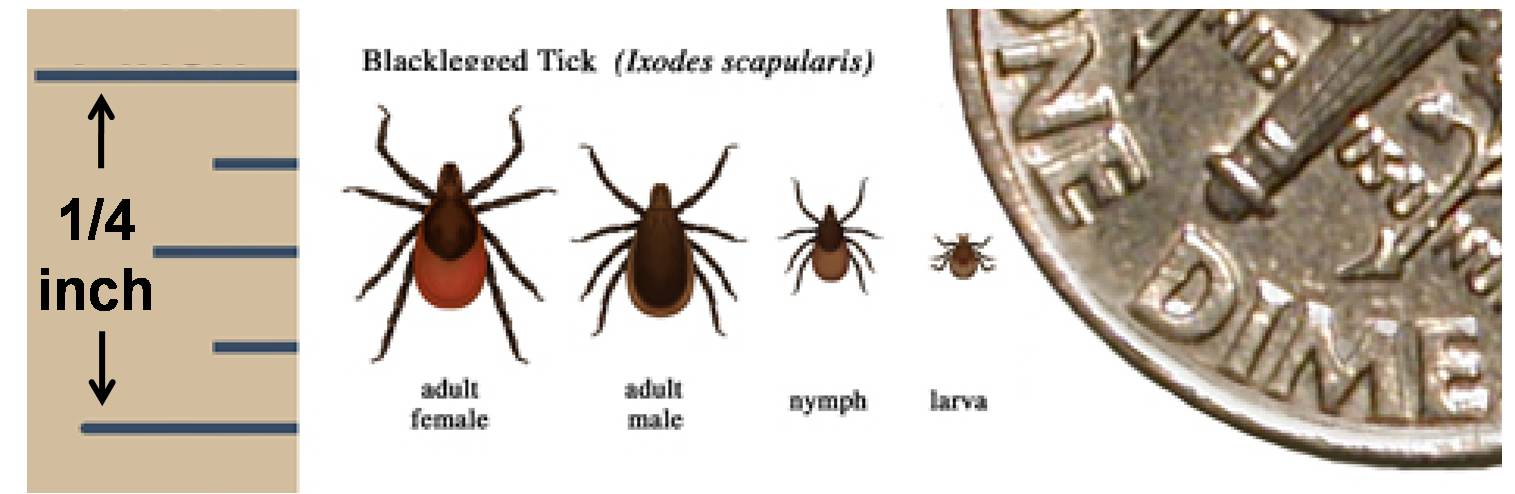
Black-legged tick

== Description ==
As a nymph and adult, Ixodes scapularis has eight legs, while larvae have six. Unlike ticks from other genera, black-legged ticks do not have eyes. The scutum is dark, inornate (plain), and, in unfed females, contrasts with the exposed orange or red remainder of the idiosoma. There are no festoons. Ixodes ticks have an anal groove that resembles a horseshoe on their underside anterior to the anal pore. The palps of male black-legged ticks, part of the mouthparts or capitulum, are shorter than those of the female. Adult female black-legged ticks are approximately 3 to 4 mm long, and may engorge while feeding, while adult males are 2 to 3 mm long and cannot engorge due to the rigidity of their scutum, which covers the entire male body.

== Distribution ==
Warming trends attributed to climate change are pushing the distribution of black-legged ticks to higher latitudes in Canada and the northern United States, and extending populations in central regions of the United States.

== Behavior ==
Ixodes scapularis has a 2-year life cycle, during which time it passes through three stages: larva, nymph, and adult. The tick must take a blood meal at each stage before maturing to the next. Black-legged tick females latch onto a host and drink its blood for 4–5 days. Deer are the preferred host of the adult black-legged tick, but it is also known to feed on small rodents. After she is engorged, the tick drops off and overwinters in the leaf litter of the forest floor. The following spring, the female lays several hundred to a few thousand eggs in clusters. Transtadial (between tick stages) passage of Borrelia burgdorferi is common. Vertical passage (from mother to egg) of Borrelia is uncommon.

Like other ticks, I. scapularis is hardy. It can be active after a hard frost, as daytime temperatures can warm it enough to keep it actively searching for a host. In the spring, it can be one of the first invertebrates to become active. Black-legged ticks can be quite numerous.

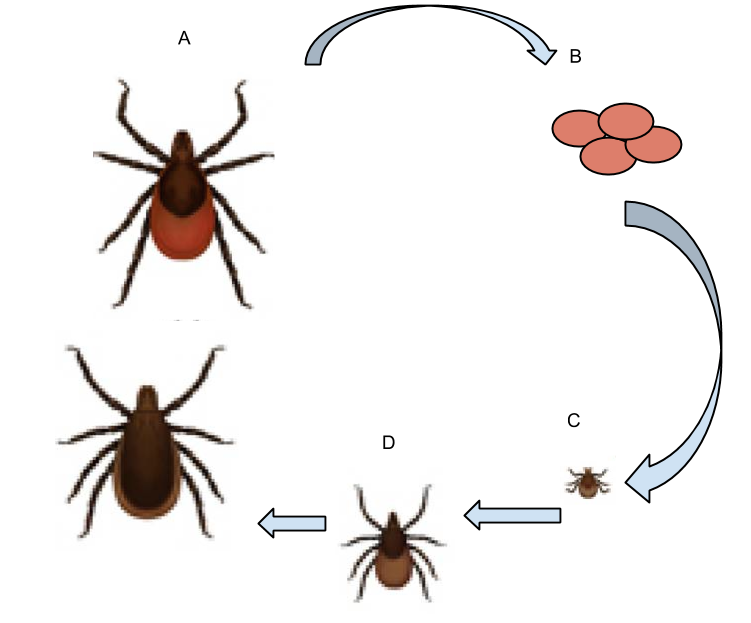
Black-legged tick life cycle

== As disease vector ==
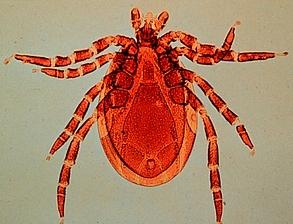
Black-legged tick

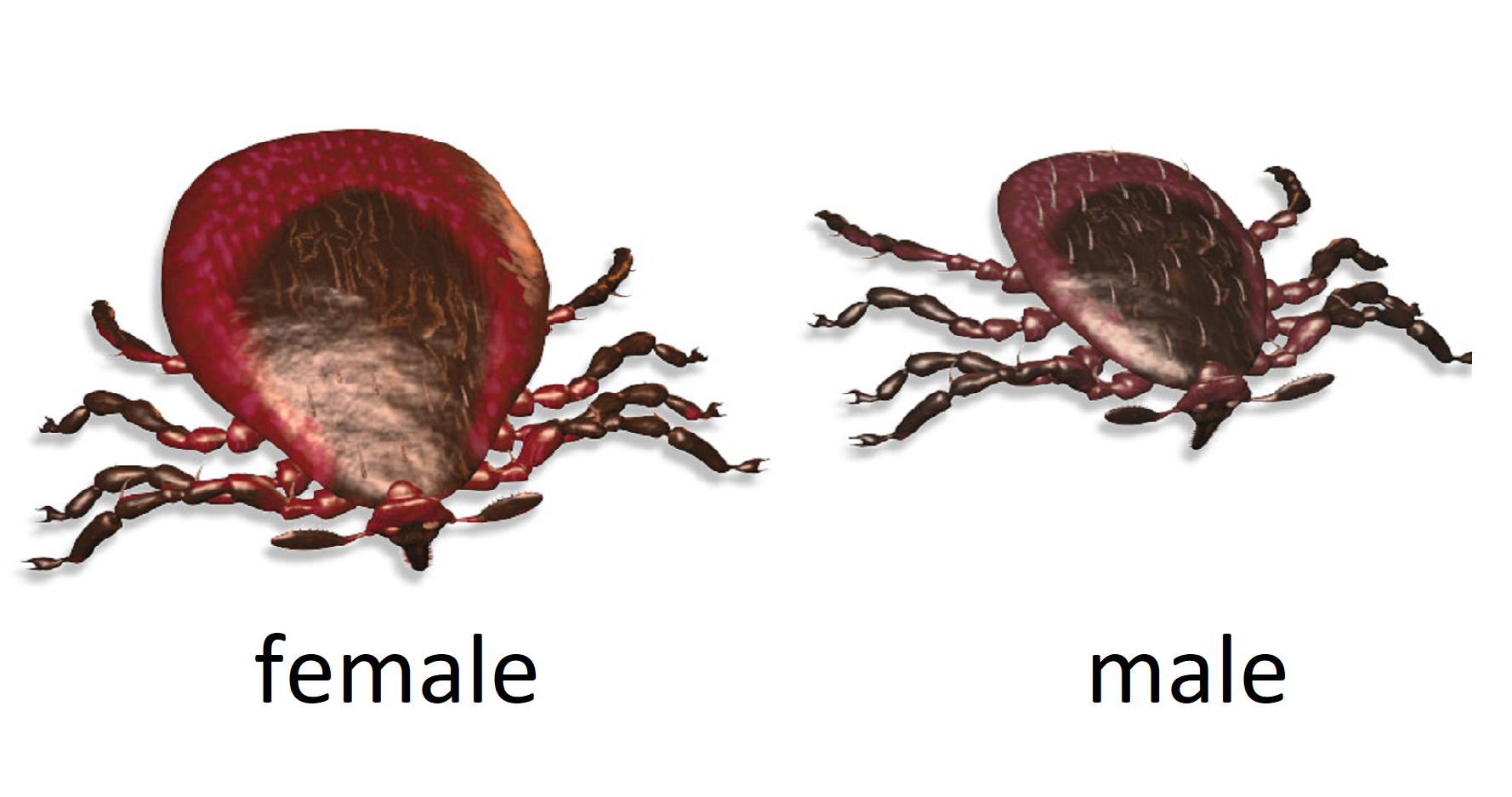
3D rendering of a male and female black-legged tick

Ixodes scapularis is the main vector of Lyme disease in North America. The CDC reported over 30,000 new cases of the disease in 2016 alone, the majority of which were contracted in the summer months, which is when ticks are most likely to bite humans. While adult black-legged ticks are more likely to carry and transmit Borrelia burgdorferi, it is more common for the hard-to-spot nymphal stage to infect humans.

It can also transmit other Borrelia species, including Borrelia miyamotoi. Ticks that transmit B. burgdorferi to humans can also carry and transmit several other parasites, such as Babesia microti and Anaplasma phagocytophilum, which cause the diseases babesiosis and human granulocytic anaplasmosis (HGA), respectively. Among early Lyme disease patients, depending on their location, 2%–12% will also have HGA and 2%–40% will have babesiosis.

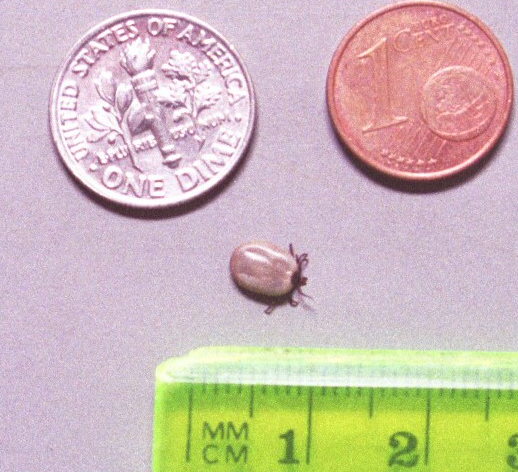
Engorged deer tick

Co-infections complicate Lyme symptoms, especially diagnosis and treatment. It is possible for a tick to carry and transmit one of the co-infections and not Borrelia, making diagnosis difficult and often elusive. The Centers for Disease Control's emerging infectious diseases department did a study in rural New Jersey of 100 ticks, and found 55% of the ticks were infected with at least one of the pathogens.

Deer, the preferred mammalian hosts of adult I. scapularis, cannot transmit Borrelia spirochaetes to ticks. Ticks acquire Lyme disease microbes by feeding on infected mice and other small rodents as nymphs or larvae.

One of the keys of the success of I. scapularis as a Borrelia vector relies on its ability to limit the proliferation of the spirochaete. This is due to the activity of domesticated amidase effector (dae) genes. Dae genes are a family of horizontally acquired genes related to type VI secretion amidase effector (tae) genes in certain bacteria which encode toxins honed to mediate interbacterial antagonism. Once transferred to eukaryotes tae genes confer novel antibacterial capabilities; this provides a selective advantage to the tick and to other eukaryotes also: tae genes have been transferred from bacteria to eukaryotes at least in six independent events. In particular, I. scapularis have inherited the dae 2 family from a common ancestor between ticks and mites. The product of dae2 expression has been shown to degrade bacterial peptidoglycan of different species and particularly from B. burgdorferi, but does not limit initial acquisition of the bacterium by the tick. Dae2 contributes to the innate ability of I. scapularis to control B. burgdorferi levels after its acquisition. This has potential ramifications for Lyme disease transmission, as spirochaete load in the tick can influence transmission efficiency.

A recent study has identified the alpha-gal sugar in the tick, and they have suggested that it may also be involved in the onset of red meat allergy (Alpha-Gal Syndrome or Mammalian Meat Allergy, MMA).

== Genome sequencing ==
The genome of I. scapularis has been sequenced. An initial genome project described the black-legged tick as having a large genome of about 2.1 gigabases, and a later chromosome-scale assembly resolved the genome into 15 pseudochromosomes corresponding to 13 autosomes and X and Y sex chromosomes.

== See also ==
- Ticks of domestic animals
- Andrew Spielman
