= Platts-Mills =

Platts-Mills is a surname, and may refer to:

- Barney Platts-Mills (1944–2021), British film director
- Daisy Platts-Mills (1868–1956), New Zealand doctor and community leader
- John Platts-Mills (1906–), New Zealand barrister and politician in the United Kingdom, son of Daisy Platts-Mills
- Thomas Platts-Mills (born 1941), British allergy researcher
