= Sheryl van Nunen =

Australian allergy researcher and immunologist

Sheryl van Nunen OAM
- Education: University of Sydney
- Scientific career
- Fields: Immunologist
- Workplaces: University of Sydney

Sheryl van Nunen is an Australian researcher who is a Visiting Medical Officer at Northern Beaches Hospital in Sydney, Australia, and Clinical Professor at the Faculty of Medicine and Health, University of Sydney. Van Nunen is most recognized for her research in allergic diseases.

== Education and career ==
Van Nunen, a specialist in allergies, is widely recognized for her work in 2007 identifying tick-induced mammalian meat allergy, which has increased in prevalence worldwide since then. In 2007 she was the first immunologist in the world to describe in a published paper the link between ticks and meat allergy. According to van Nunen, Australia has the highest rate of mammalian meat allergy and tick anaphylaxis in the world.

In 2018, after four years in development, van Nunen, in collaboration with a pharmaceuticals company and northern Sydney hospital Emergency Department, released a world-first freeze spray designed to be topically applied to ticks that have attached to humans. The spray kills ticks by freezing, rather than by the traditional method of removal using tweezers. Removing ticks by tweezers was found to have a significantly detrimental effect because tweezers squeeze toxins from the tick into the host and thereby significantly increase the allergen injected. A study released in 2019 by van Nunen supports the growing consensus in Australia to kill the tick in situ rather than pull the tick out.

== Medical research ==
Van Nunen had been working at a practice in a tick-prone area of Sydney, when some patients reported having allergic reactions to red meat after being bitten by ticks in their local areas.

Some patients developed allergies to sugar molecule alpha galactose, more commonly known as alpha-gal, which is commonly found in meat and animal products e.g. cow's milk and gelatine.

"Mammalian meat allergy will only come up under certain circumstances, so it's an anytime but not an every time allergy," van Nunen said. "This is one of the problems with diagnosis."

Van Nunen advises that tick anaphylaxis and mammalian meat allergy is preventable if one deals appropriately with the ticks. Preventative measures can also be applied by regularly treating your lawns and dressing appropriately to minimize your risk of exposure to ticks.

Van Nunen advises that mammalian-meat allergy is a rare condition, albeit that she has managed hundreds of cases to date. “After you’ve seen a couple of people and the story’s the same, I like to know what’s happening to them, so I always take a family history of allergy,” she says. These patients said they had experienced a large, localized reaction, or a more extreme systemic reaction, when they’d been bitten by a tick.

When more and more patients presented presenting with similar symptoms, it quickly became clear that it was a tick causing these significant reactions in patients. The tick causing these significant reactions in patients can be found in the Northern Beaches areas.

The tick deploys a unique strategy to maintain attached to its host for an extended period of time, thereby going unnoticed. The tick remains undetectable by using its saliva, which contains anticoagulants, ensuring uninterrupted blood flow, which numbs the surrounding skin, suppresses the host's immune response, preventing any inflammatory reactions, thereby remaining undetectable for extended periods of time.

In August 2020 van Nunen urged sufferers of hay fever to get tested for COVID-19.

== Selected publications ==
- An association between tick bite reactions and red meat allergy in humans (2009),, Sheryl A Van Nunen, Kate S O'Connor, Lesley R Clarke, Richard X Boyle, Suran L Fernando; Medical journal of Australia 190 (9)
- Post‐mammoplasty connective tissue disease (1982),, Sheryl A Van Nunen, Paul A Gatenby, Antony Basten; Arthritis & Rheumatism: Official Journal of the American College of Rheumatology
- An immunoassay for the detection of IgE antibodies to trimethoprim in the sera of allergic patients (1987), DG Harle, BA Baldo, MA Smal, SA Van Nunen; Clinical & Experimental Allergy Vol 17, Issue 3
- Clinical utility of allergen-specific IgE measurement in the diagnosis of mammalian meat-induced anaphylaxis associated with prior tick bites (2011), Sheryl van Nunen, Monica Mastroanni, Richard Fulton, Suran Fernando, Tony Basten; Internal Medicine Journal, Vol 41, pp21-21

== Awards and recognition ==
In 2021 van Nunen was awarded the Order of Australia Medal for service to medicine, particularly to clinical immunology and allergy.
