= Pork–cat syndrome =

Allergy to pork linked with cat allergy

- Specialty: Immunology

Pork–cat syndrome is an allergy to pork, usually after adolescence, that is related to a cat allergy. Although first described in 1994, it was first documented in the U.S. by Scott Commins and Thomas Platts-Mills during their research on alpha-gal allergy.

It is called "pork–cat syndrome" because it is a cross-reactivity where an allergy to cat serum albumin (protein made by a cat's liver) cross-reacts with pork albumin and "can lead to severe or even fatal allergic reactions on occasions when pork is consumed."

In its 1994 description, the subjects studied that were suffering from the allergy were predominantly female, and only 1 out of the 5 observed were male.

== See also ==
- Allergy to cats
- Alpha-gal syndrome (mammal meat allergy)
- List of allergies
