= Galactose-α-1,3-galactose =

Names
- Systematic IUPAC name 3-O-α-D-Galactopyranosyl-D-galactopyranose
- Other names Alpha-gal; 3-α-Galactobiose; Gal(α1-3)Gal; alpha-D-Gal-(1→3)-D-Gal

Identifiers
CAS Number	13168-24-6; 7313-98-6 (alternative)
3D model (JSmol)	Interactive image
ChemSpider	17346769
PubChem CID	16219440
UNII	XW90KQ841P
CompTox Dashboard (EPA)	DTXSID501045270
- InChI: InChI=1S/C12H22O11/c13-1-3-5(15)7(17)8(18)12(22-3)23-10-6(16)4(2-14)21-11(20)9(10)19/h3-20H,1-2H2/t3-,4-,5+,6+,7+,8-,9-,10+,11?,12-/m1/s1 Key: QIGJYVCQYDKYDW-SDOYDPJRSA-N
- SMILES: O([C@@H]1[C@@H](O)C(O)O[C@H](CO)[C@@H]1O)[C@H]2O[C@@H]([C@H](O)[C@H](O)[C@H]2O)CO

Properties
Chemical formula	C_{12}H_{22}O_{11}
Molar mass	342.297 g·mol^{−1}
- Except where otherwise noted, data are given for materials in their standard state (at 25 °C [77 °F], 100 kPa). Infobox references

Galactose-α-1,3-galactose, commonly known as alpha gal and the Galili antigen, is a disaccharide (a type of carbohydrate) formed from two galactose molecules.

== Biology ==
Galactose-α-1,3-galactose is found in most mammalian cell membranes. It is not found in catarrhines, including humans, who have lost the glycoprotein alpha-1,3-galactosyltransferase (GGTA1) gene.

Anti-alpha gal immunoglobulin G (IgG) antibodies are some of the most common in humans. Regular stimulation from gut flora, typically initiated within the first six months of life, leads to an exceptionally high titre of around 1% of all circulating IgG.

Human reaction to alpha gal has beneficial uses as a vaccine adjuvant and for enhancing wound healing.

=== Allergy ===
Alpha-gal syndrome is an allergic reaction to the carbohydrate. It is caused by tick bites.

Alpha gal has been suggested to play a role in an immunoglobulin E-specific allergic response to some meats. While this allergic response is quite well documented, there is significant discrepancy between laboratory tests and clinical findings, indicating that much research must still be done on the alpha gal mechanism of action and related tests. Recent studies are showing increasing evidence that this allergy may be induced by the bite of the lone star tick (Amblyomma americanum) in North America and the castor bean tick (Ixodes ricinus) in Sweden.

=== Xenotransplantation ===
The human immune system recognizes alpha gal as a foreign substance and produce xenoreactive immunoglobulin M (IgM) antibodies, leading to organ rejection after xenotransplantation.

A bacterial α-galactosidase that efficiently removes linear alpha gal ends from molecules has been identified. It could be useful for xenotransplantation in the future.

== See also ==
- Alpha-gal allergy
- Galactose
