= Poultry allergy =

Rare food allergy caused by poultry meat

Poultry meat allergy is a rare food allergy in humans caused by consumption of poultry meat (commonly chicken and turkey) whereby the body triggers an immune reaction and becomes overloaded with immunoglobulin E (IgE) antibodies.

It can co-occur with egg allergy but more often occurs without allergy to poultry eggs. One study found that not chicken, just turkey meat is the primary cause of allergic reactions, whilst goose, pheasant, and duck meat cause milder reaction or no symptoms.

== Symptoms and signs ==
Symptoms are similar to other forms of allergies and occur after ingestion of the allergen. Some symptoms include abdominal cramping, angioedema, generalized urticaria, and chest tightness.

== Epidemiology ==
As it is a rare condition and it is not well documented; epidemiological data is unknown. Severe cases have been documented. A research study in 2016 found only 16 cases of previously published poultry meat allergy, plus an additional 28 cases that were being analyzed in the study.
