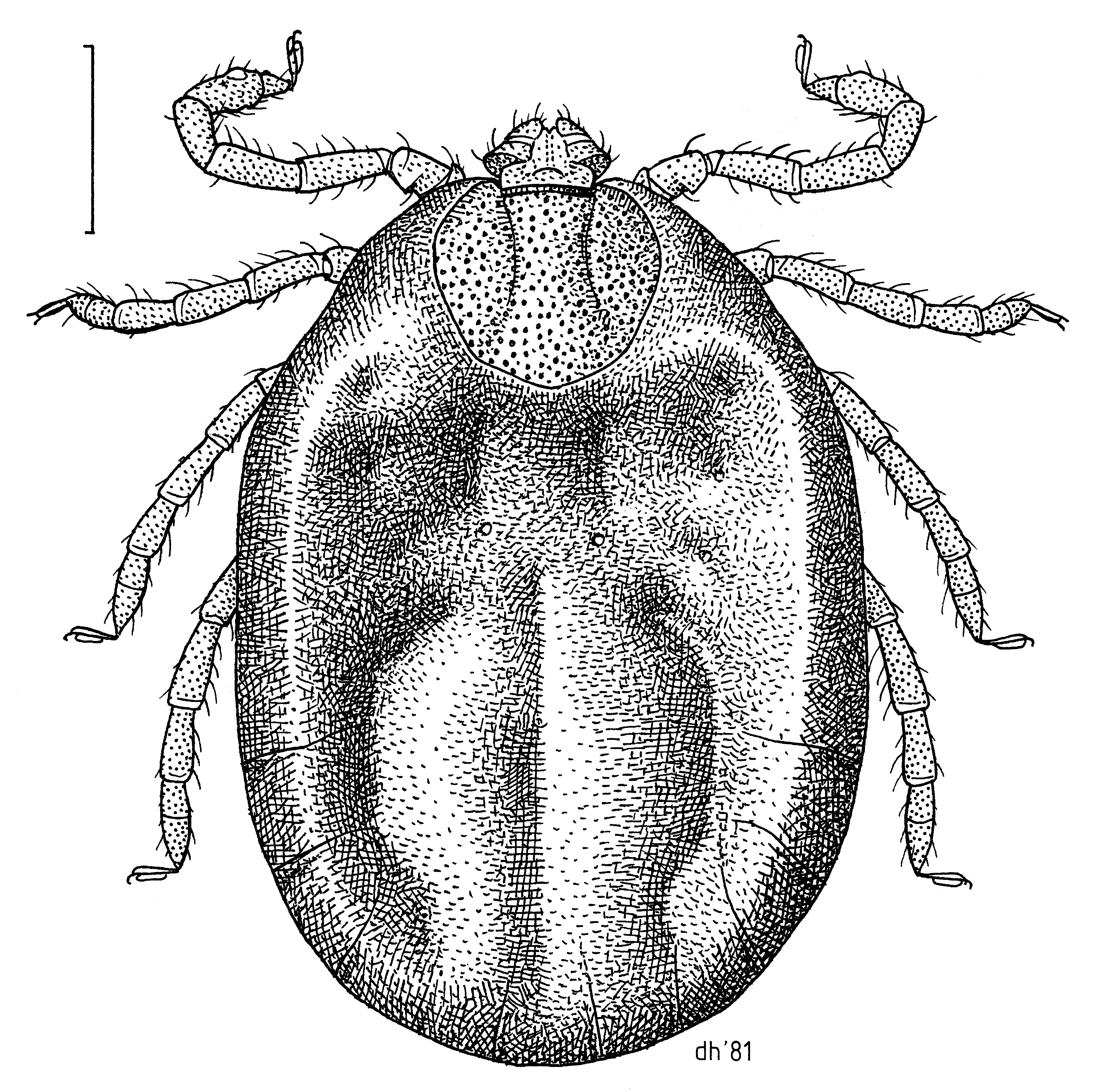
- Illustration by Des Helmore

Scientific classification
- Kingdom: Animalia
- Phylum: Arthropoda
- Subphylum: Chelicerata
- Class: Arachnida
- Order: Ixodida
- Family: Ixodidae
- Genus: Haemaphysalis
- Species: H. longicornis

Binomial name
- Haemaphysalis longicornis Neumann, 1901

= Haemaphysalis longicornis =

Species of tick

Haemaphysalis longicornis, the Asian longhorned tick, longhorned tick, bush tick, Asian tick, or cattle tick, is a parasitic arachnid belonging to the tick family Ixodidae. The Asian longhorned tick is a known livestock pest, especially in New Zealand, and can transmit a disease called theileriosis to cattle but not to humans. However, the tick has been associated with several other tickborne diseases in humans.

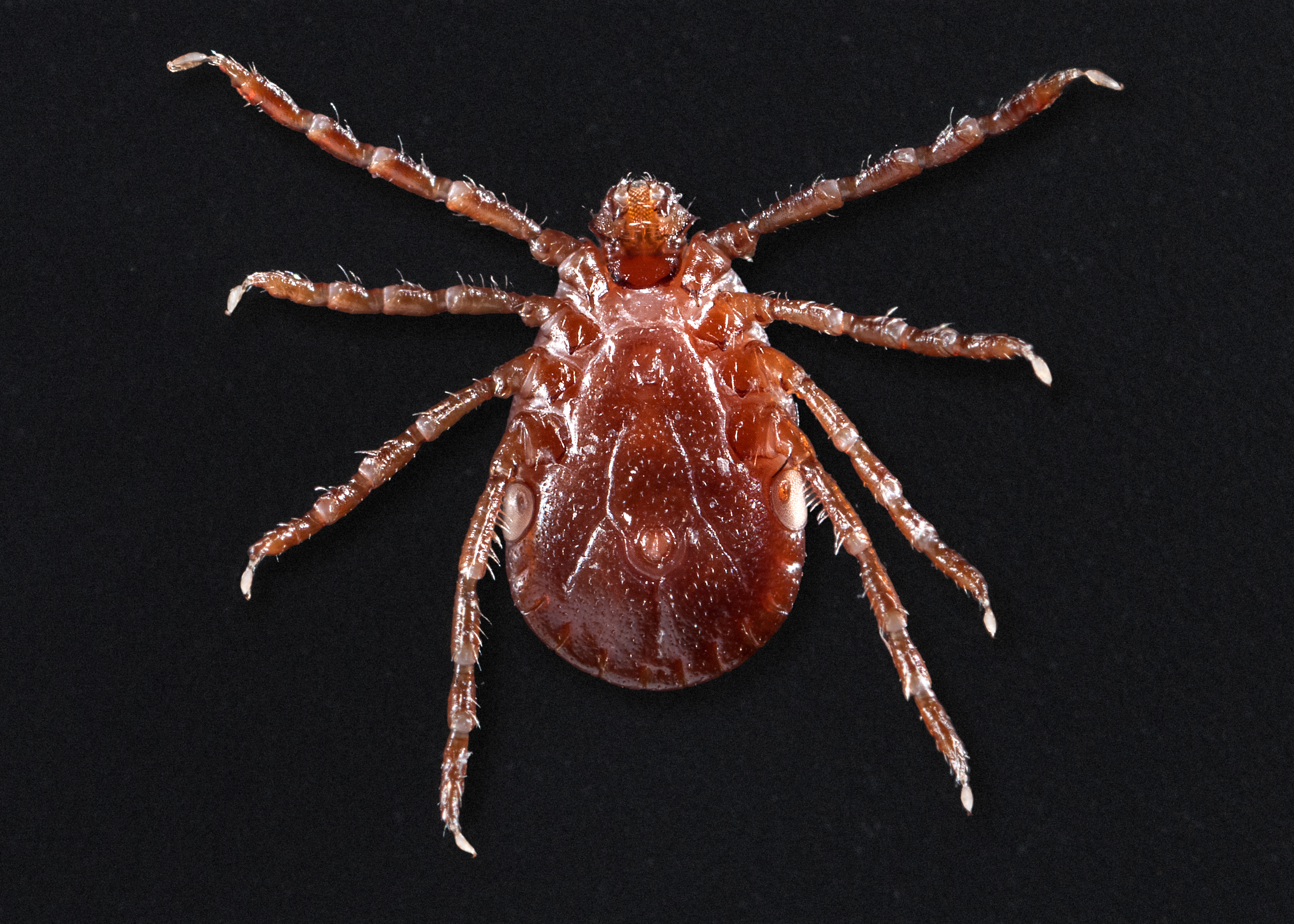
Unfed female Haemaphysalis longicornis, ventral (underside) view, about 2.3 mm long.

An unfed female is typically 2.0–2.6 mm long and 1.5–1.8 mm wide, and grows to 9.8 mm long and 8.2 mm wide with engorgement. Distinguishing a specimen from other members of the genus Haemaphysalis requires microscopic examination of minor physical characteristics.

== Geographic distribution ==
The Asian longhorned tick is native to temperate areas of East and Central Asia, including China, Korea, and Japan, as well as Pacific islands including Australia, New Zealand, and Fiji to name a few.

The species was not known to be present on the mainland United States until 9 November 2017, when it was first discovered on a sheep farm in Hunterdon County, New Jersey, although it had been intercepted at U.S. ports on import animals and materials at least a dozen times. The Asian longhorned tick has been found in 12 states: New Jersey, Virginia, West Virginia, North Carolina, South Carolina, Pennsylvania, New York, Arkansas, Maryland, Connecticut, Ohio, and Maine. Attempts to eradicate the species from New Jersey failed; the tick successfully overwintered and has since become established in the state as an invasive species. The tick may have been present in the eastern US for several years, but only recently detected.

== Biology ==
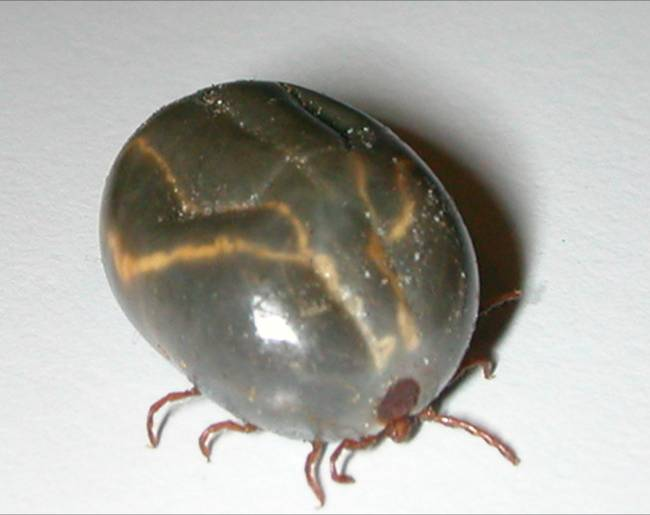
Engorged female H. longicornis, dorsal view, about 10 mm long

The H. longicornis seasonal feeding and reproductive cycles resemble those of other ticks. The tick can reproduce sexually or by an asexual process called parthenogenesis. The latter exist in northern Japan and Russia, whereas the former exist in southern Japan, southern Korea, and southern parts of the former Soviet Union. An aneuploid race capable of both sexual and asexual reproduction exists in China. Unfed ticks can survive for close to a year, nymphs and adult females the longest, depending on temperature and humidity.

=== Host ===
The Asian longhorned tick parasitizes mammals and birds. It spreads quickly in farm animals such as cattle, horses, sheep, pigs, and chickens. Natural infestations have been found on wild animals such as bear, deer, foxes, and hares, small mammals such as ferrets and rats, and birds. It has also been found on cats, dogs, and humans. It is believed to migrate by parasitizing birds, which carry it to new areas.

=== Disease vector ===
The Asian longhorned tick can transmit an animal disease called theileriosis to cattle, which can cause considerable blood loss and occasional death of calves, but mainly is important to dairy farmers because of decreased milk production and sheep farmers because of decreased wool quantity and quality.

Human diseases such as Lyme spirochetes, spotted fever group rickettsiae, Ehrlichia chaffeensis, and Anaplasma bovis have been detected in H. longicornis. It has been associated with Russian spring-summer encephalitis, Powassan virus, Khasan virus, tick-borne encephalitis virus, Japanese spotted fever, and severe fever with thrombocytopenia syndrome. In a survey of 13,053 ticks collected in nine provinces of South Korea, H. longicornis accounted for 90.8% of the specimens and SFTSV was detected in every developmental stage. Human pathogens have not so far been detected in the Asian longhorned tick in the US.

== See also ==
- Haemaphysalis concinna
