= Thomas Platts-Mills =

British academic

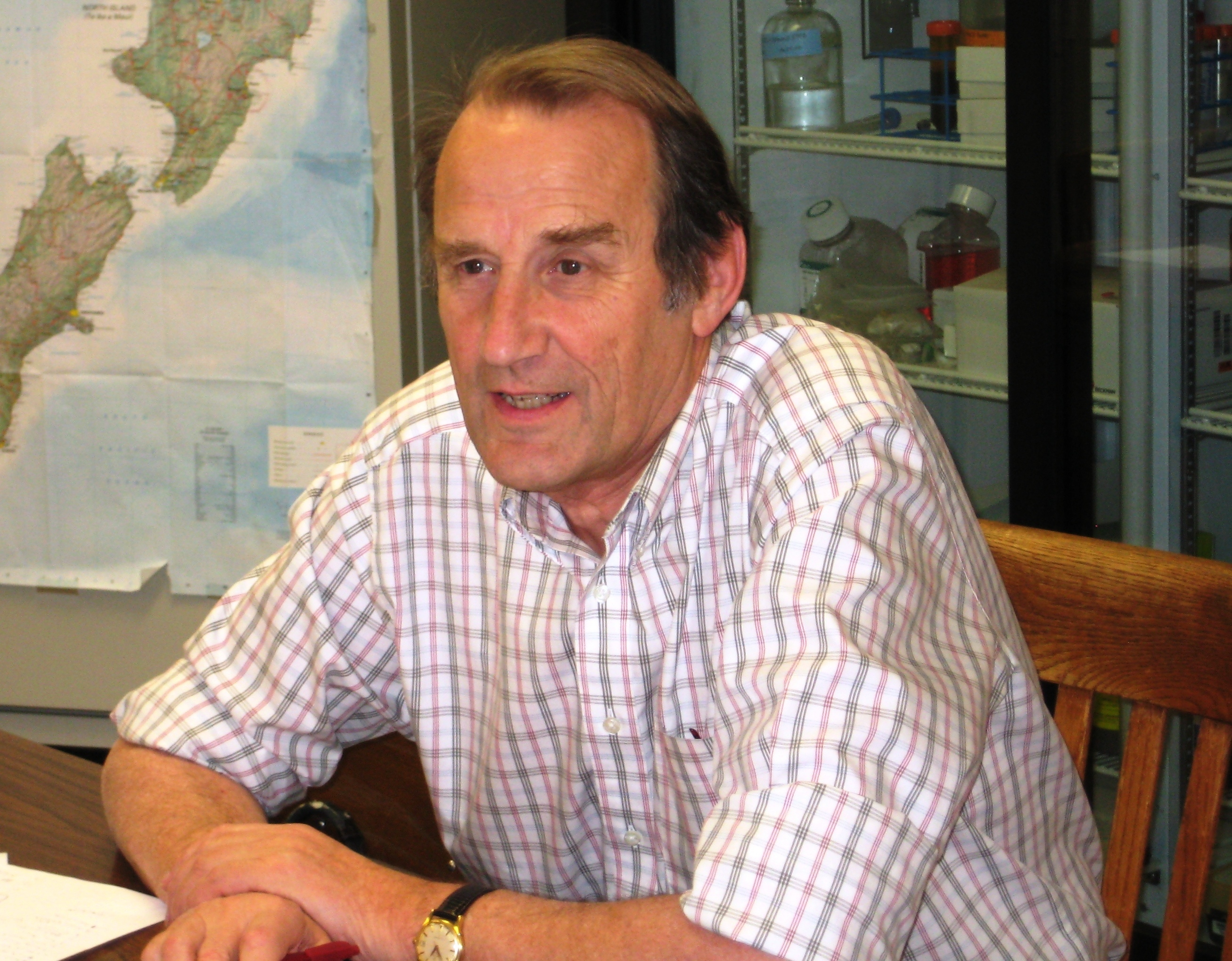
- Thomas Platts-Mills in 2010
- Born: 22 November 1941 (age 84); Colchester
- Education: Balliol College, Oxford; St. Thomas' Hospital Medical School; London University; Johns Hopkins University
- Awards: Fellow of the Royal Society
- Scientific career
- Fields: Allergy, Immunology
- Workplaces: University of Virginia School of Medicine, Medical Research Council

Thomas Alexander Evelyn Platts-Mills, FRS (born 1941, Colchester), son of British member of parliament John Platts-Mills, is a British allergy researcher and director of the Division of Allergy and Clinical Immunology at the University of Virginia School of Medicine.

Platts-Mills was educated at University College London. He then went to Balliol College, Oxford and St. Thomas' Hospital Medical School, received his PhD from London University, and completed a fellowship at Johns Hopkins University under the tutelage of Kimishige Ishizaka. He became a member of the Royal College of Physicians in 1971.

From 1975 to 1982, he worked in Britain for the Medical Research Council. Since 1982 he has worked at the University of Virginia where he has been Professor of Medicine and Microbiology and, since 1993, head of the Division of Allergy and Clinical Immunology. He served as President of the American Academy of Allergy, Asthma, and Immunology (AAAAI) from March 2006 to March 2007.

== Research ==
Since 1974, Platts-Mills has been active in research on allergic disease and has published more than 350 papers.

His research includes the first purification and publication of a dust mite allergen in 1978, the development of immunoassays for dust mite allergens, and the establishment that it is mite fecal particles which are inhaled. Platts-Mills has researched the immune response to a range of allergens including those from pollens, dust mites, the fungus Trichophyton, and domestic cats.

Platts-Mills is credited with the discovery of the mammalian meat allergy, after he discovered in 2002 the link between alpha-gal allergy and Lone Star tick bites.

== Awards ==
In 2010, his research earned Platts-Mills election as a Fellow of the Royal Society, the first allergist to be named to this select group.
