= Clinical & Experimental Allergy =

- Discipline: Allergy
- Language: English
- Edited by: Andy Wardlaw

Publication details
- History: 1971-present
- Publisher: Wiley-Blackwell (United Kingdom)
- Frequency: monthly
- Impact factor: 5.018 (2020)

Standard abbreviations
- ISO 4: Clin. Exp. Allergy

Indexing
- ISSN: 0954-7894 (print); 1365-2222 (web)

Links
- Journal homepage

Clinical & Experimental Allergy is a monthly journal dedicated to the field of allergy. The official journal of the British Society for Allergy & Clinical Immunology (BSACI), it has been in publication since 1971. A subscription to the journal is included with BSACI membership, but the journal is also available to other subscribers.
