= Kliegl =

Kliegl is a German surname. It may refer to:

- Johann Kliegl (1869–1959), German-American businessman
- Anton Kliegl (1872–1927), German-American businessman and inventor, brother of Johann Kliegl
- Kliegl Brothers Universal Electric Stage Lighting Company, Johann and Anton Kliegl's company
- Klieg light, carbon arc light invented by Anton Kliegl
