= Robert Ferryman =

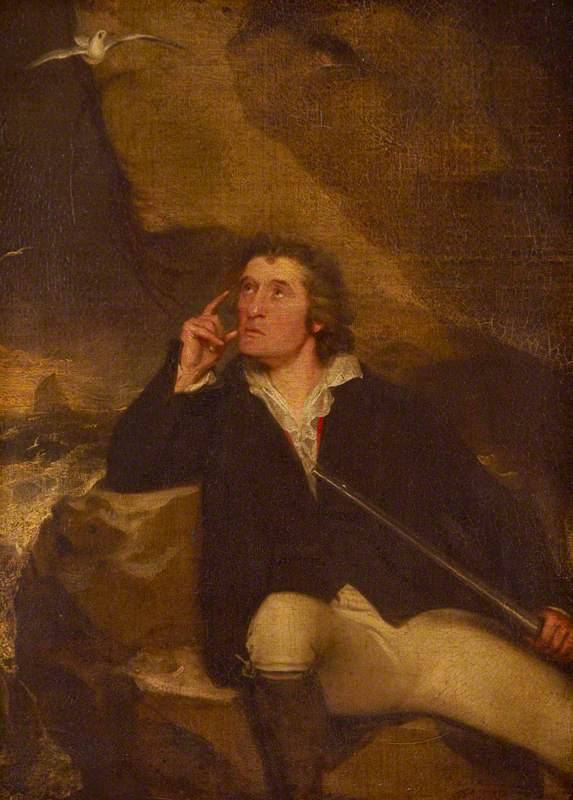
Portrait, 1797, by Thomas Phillips (1770–1845)

Robert Ferryman (1752 – November 1837) was an English clergyman, naturalist, private museum owner, and pioneer of American ornithology. He was a friend of Edward Jenner who promoted his work.

== Life and work ==
Ferryman was born in Barrow-on-Soar, Leicestershire, the son of gentleman farmer John Ferryman (c.1720-1784) and Elizabeth Beaumont (c.1727-1797). He became interested in natural history at an early age, collecting specimens of birds at the age of seventeen. He trained as a priest and was ordained deacon in the Church of England in 1776. In 1777 he was curate at Ratcliffe-on-Wreake. He married Sibylla Mary Barke (1758–1838) at St Margaret's church, Westminster, in 1782 and they would have seven children. Financial strains forced him to try a career as a brewer in London but failed and he was back in 1776 as a curate at Nettleton, Lincolnshire. As a naturalist, he became a friend of Edward Jenner (1749–1823) and the Earl of Berkeley, Frederick Augustus who visited his private collection. In 1787, Jenner introduced him to Sir Joseph Banks. In 1788 Ferryman began to charge 1 shilling for visitors to his private museum with stuffed specimens of birds and mammals. Jenner noted that the eyes of the taxidermied specimens were made by Ferryman himself from glass and enamel, more accurate than the specimens in the Leverian museum. The museum which is thought to have been in Gloucester was documented in a 12-page catalogue published from Bristol and had 84 species of bird listed. By the 1790s, Ferryman had a circle of wealthy people and he tried his hand at inventing devices such as a lock, a valve cock, a corn processing machine, and also tried his hand at gardening. In 1795 he again ran into financial difficulties, shifting from Fulham to Gloucestershire County, possibly living with Edward Jenner in Cheltenham. Ferryman built the Temple of Vaccinia for Jenner in Berkeley where vaccinations were provided for the poor. Jenner helped Ferryman find a position in Gloucester and in 1796 as rector at Iping and Chithurst, Sussex. Ferryman helped in the private museum of George Wyndham, 3rd Earl of Egremont at Petworth House. He separated from his wife in 1815, who moved to live in Boulogne, France. He left his position as rector and moved to Nova Scotia. In 1808-9 he had made a short visit to Nova Scotia with support from the Society for the Propagation of the Gospel in Foreign Parts, possibly also to escape from his creditors. He collected bird and mammal specimens in Nova Scotia and produced "A descriptive catalogue of the quadrupeds and birds collected and preserved in the British North American colonies" (1817). He worked in Luneburg for a year as a missionary. He returned to England in 1819 and lived in Iping until his death.

Ferryman's publications included:

- Ferryman, R. 1789. A catalogue of British quadrupeds and birds in the museum. Bristol: J. Rudhall
- Ferryman, R. 1795. A catalogue of British quadrupeds and birds in the British Zoological Museum, Oxford Street, London
- Ferryman, R. 1802. Observations on the proper modes for preparing what flour for bread. London
- Ferryman, R. 1817. A descriptive catalogue of the quadrupeds and birds collected and preserved in the British North American colonies. London: Darton, Harvey and Darton
