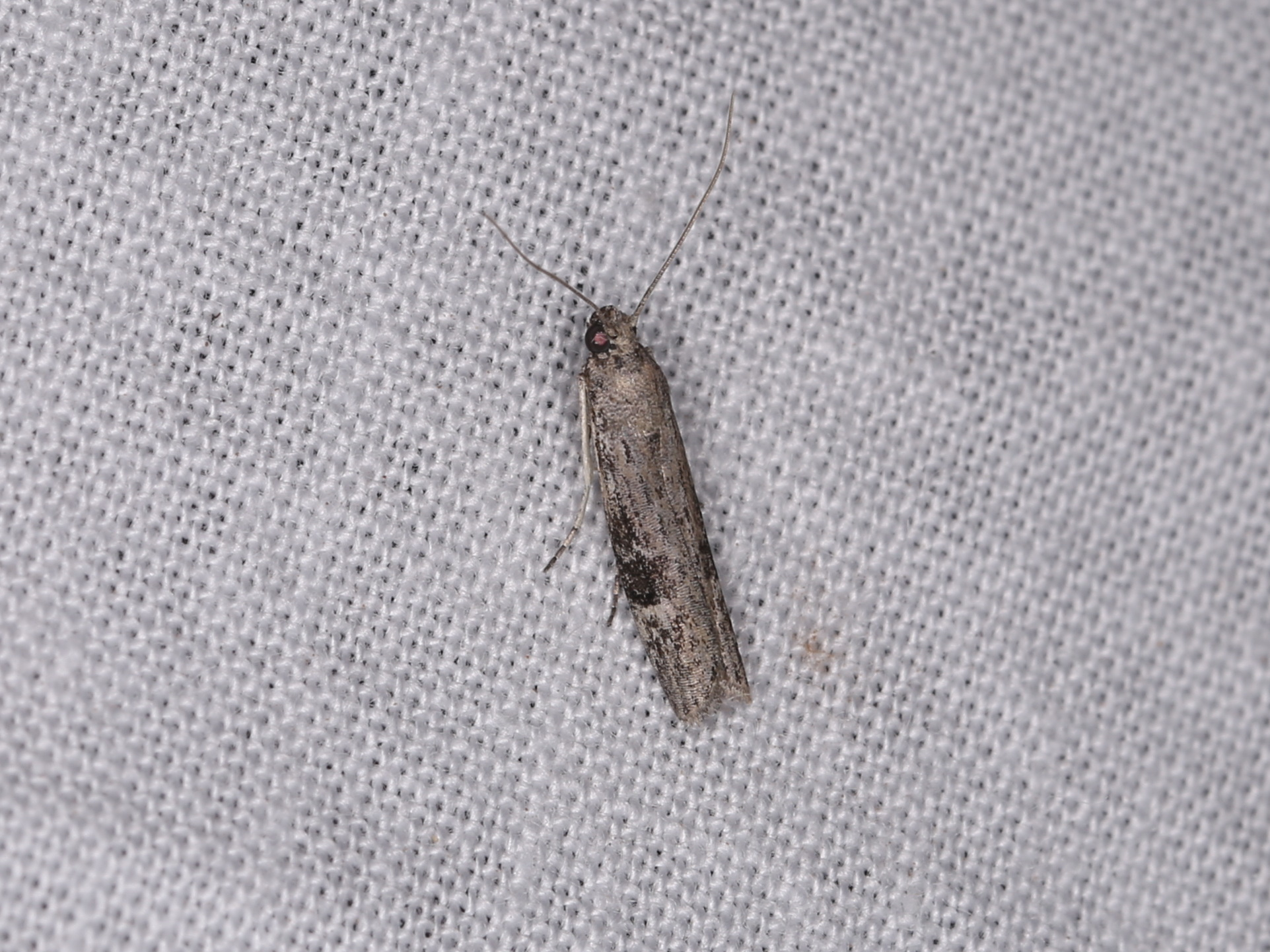
- Copamyntis leptocosma to actinic light

Scientific classification
- Domain: Eukaryota
- Kingdom: Animalia
- Phylum: Arthropoda
- Class: Insecta
- Order: Lepidoptera
- Family: Pyralidae
- Genus: Copamyntis
- Species: C. leptocosma

Binomial name
- Copamyntis leptocosma (Turner, 1904)

Synonyms
- Euzopherodes leptocosma Turner, 1904; Euzopherodes poliocrana Lower, 1905

= Copamyntis leptocosma =

Species of moth

Copamyntis leptocosma is a species of snout moth in the genus Copamyntis. It is found in Australia.
