= Copamyntis spodoptila =

Scientific classification
- Domain: Eukaryota
- Kingdom: Animalia
- Phylum: Arthropoda
- Class: Insecta
- Order: Lepidoptera
- Family: Pyralidae
- Genus: Copamyntis
- Species: C. spodoptila

Binomial name
- Copamyntis spodoptila (Turner, 1913)

Synonyms
- Euzopherodes spodoptila Turner, 1913

Species of moth

Copamyntis spodoptila is a species of snout moth in the genus Copamyntis. It is found in Australia.
