= Klieg light =

Carbon arc lamp

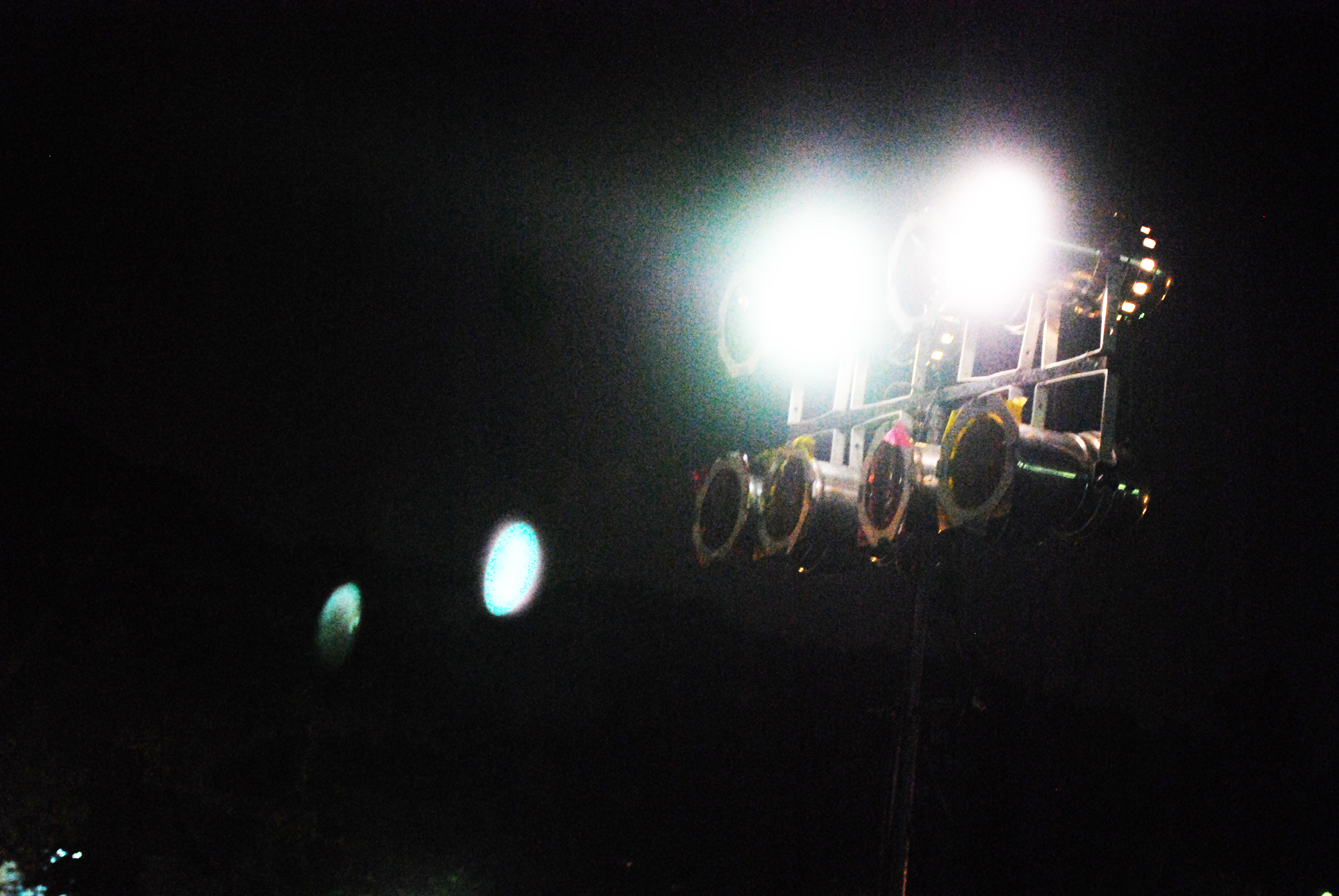
Klieg lights

A Klieg light is an intense carbon arc lamp especially used in filmmaking. It is named after inventor John Kliegl and his brother Anton Kliegl. Klieg lights usually have a Fresnel lens with a spherical reflector or an ellipsoidal reflector with a lens train containing two plano-convex lenses or a single step lens.

== Film ==
The carbon-arc source was so bright that it allowed film directors to shoot daytime scenes at night. The intense light produced by the light led to some actors developing an eye inflammation referred to as "Klieg eye".

== Stage ==
In the early days of spotlights, the name "Klieg light" became synonymous with any ellipsoidal reflector spotlight (ERS), other carbon-arc sources or any bright source. Initially developed for film, the Klieg light was adapted for use as an incandescent stage fixture in 1911.

Although not completely certain, the title of the first ellipsoidal reflector spotlight often goes to the 1933 Klieglight, which was first used to light an outdoor pageant in New York. Century Lighting introduced their Lekolite, developed by Levy & Kook, hence the name "Leko", in the same year.

Kliegl Brothers Universal Electric Stage Lighting Company was founded in 1896 and grew to be the largest stage lighting company in the world. The company closed in the 1990s, though members of the original Kliegl family continue to work professionally in the lighting industry to this day.

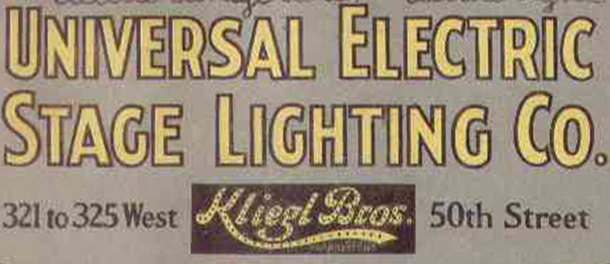
Kliegl Brothers' ad

== Alternative name ==
While the Kliegls were German-born, the "klieg light" generic name for their type of stage and film lights was never popular in Germany, which developed Europe's largest movie industry in the 1920s. "Kliegl-Leuchte" never caught on and was almost unknown, since the Kliegl Brothers company had limited business in continental Europe. Instead, the generic term was "Jupiterlicht," or literally, Jupiter light, or in French "lampes Jupiter," so named after a Berlin company supplying German and European studios and theater stages. The technical brand name quickly became popular as a generic metaphor for the movies. For example, renowned German-American cinema theorist and sociologist Siegfried Kracauer used the title "Die Jupiterlampen brennen weiter" for his 1926 critique of Sergey Eisenstein's film Battleship Potemkin; this classic text, often used in cinema studies, has been translated into English as "The Klieg Lights Stay On" but in French as "Les lampes Jupiter restent allumées".

== See also ==
- Actinic conjunctivitis—inflammation of the eye that may be caused by overexposure to Klieg lights or other bright lights
- Limelight
