= Photophthalmia =

Type of photokeratitis

Photophthalmia ( pho·toph·thal·mia (fōt″of-thal´me-ah) ) is ophthalmia or inflammation of the eye, especially of the cornea and conjunctiva due to exposure to intense light of short wavelength (as ultraviolet light), as in snow blindness.

It involves occurrence of multiple epithelial erosions due to the effect of ultraviolet rays, especially between 311 and 290 nm. Snow blindness occurs due to reflection of ultraviolet rays from snow surface. Photoretinitis is another form that can occur due to infra-red rays (eclipse burn of retina).

== Presentation ==
It can present with the following:

- severe burning pain
- lacrimation
- photophobia
- blepharospasm
- swelling of palpebral conjunctiva
- retrotarsal folds

Usually the effect of UV exposure is felt after 6-8 hours from exposure. With severe irritation, the eyes become blood red. In minor cases, avoid rubbing and wash the eyes thoroughly with water until the irritation subdues. Always consult an eye specialist as soon as possible. Medications (for minor erosion of cornea) usually involve eye drop such as Hydroxypropyl Methycellulose Ophthalmic solution USP sold under the trade name GenTeal®. (February 2019)

== Prevention ==
Crooke’s glass is a prophylactic aid consisting of a spectacle lens combined with metallic oxides to absorb ultraviolet or infrared rays and should be used by those who are prone to exposure e.g. Welding workers, cinema operators.

== Treatment ==
The following may provide relief:

- Cold compresses
- Pad and bandage with antibiotics drops for 24 hours, heals most of the cases
- anaesthetic drops should not be used
- Oral analgesics if pain is intolerable
- Single dose of tranquilizers
