= John Baron (physician) =

English physician

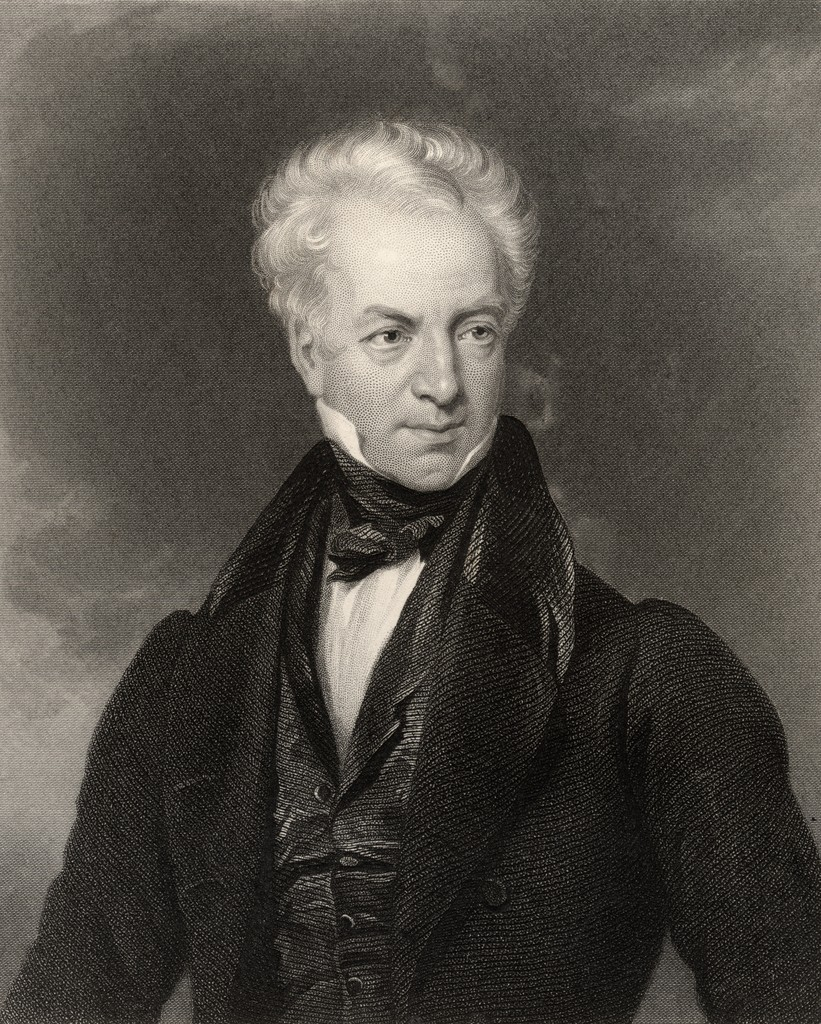
John Baron c. 1820.

John Baron, M.D. (1786–1851), was an English physician, the biographer of Edward Jenner.

== Life ==
He was born at St. Andrews, where his father was professor of rhetoric in the university. At the age of fifteen he was sent to Edinburgh to study medicine, and he graduated M.D. there four years later (1805), at the age of nineteen. The same year his father died, and he prepared his college lectures for the press. He then attended a patient in Lisbon for two years, and on his return settled in practice at Gloucester. Appointed one of the physicians to the General Infirmary, he acquired a practice as a physician in Gloucester and the surrounding country.

In 1832, poor health after Asiatic cholera obliged him to retire. He lived at Cheltenham during the rest of his life, disabled by 'creeping palsy' during his later years. He was an early advocate, at the Gloucester asylum, of the more humane treatment of lunatics, was a founder of the Medical Benevolent Fund, and an active supporter of the Medical Missionary Society of Edinburgh. He died in 1851.

Among his friends were Dr. Matthew Baillie, who had a country house in the Cotswolds, near Cirencester, and Edward Jenner, who practised in the Vale of Berkeley, on the other side of the hills, sixteen miles from Gloucester.

== Works ==
He came to know Jenner about 1809, and was designated as Jenner's biographer by the executors. Copious biographical materials were put into his hands soon after Jenner's death in 1823; but the 'Life of Edward Jenner, M.D., LL.D., F.R.S., with Illustrations of his Doctrine and Selections from his Correspondence,’ in two vols. with two portraits, was not completed until 1838. The book includes a history of the vaccination movement.

Baron's attitude to Jenner was that of the unquestioning disciple. In 1839 he prepared a report on vaccination for the Provincial Medical and Surgical Association, ahead of legislation; it was attacked for uncritical acceptance of Jenner's view of the permanence of protection given by vaccinations. Baron's use of statistical evidence was also questioned, by George Gregory.

Baron also published three books on tubercles:

- 'Enquiry illustrating the Nature of Tuberculated Accretions of Serous Membranes,’ &c., plates, London, 1819;
- 'Illustrations of the Enquiry respecting Tuberculous Diseases,’ plates, London, 1822; and
- 'Delineations of the Changes of Structure which occur in Man and some of the Inferior Animals,’ plates, London, 1828.

His services to pathology gained Baron admission to the Royal Society in 1823. The theory of tubercles, from Jenner and earlier John Hunter, later ran out as misleading; it had opponents in Gaspard Laurent Bayle, René Laennec, and François-Joseph-Victor Broussais. Dupuy, a French veterinarian, had been led two years earlier (1817), and independently of Baron, to adopt the same hydatid theory, to explain the hanging 'pearls' or 'grapes' that are a common form of tubercle in cattle. The idea was that tubercles were hydatids become solid. Hydatids were then understood to include not only bladderworms, but almost any kind of vesicle filled with fluid. Jenner had been misled by the coexistence of tubercles and true hydatids in the lung of the ox, leading him to adopt the "hydatid theory" of tubercles in general.
