= Ophthalmia =

Inflammation of the eye

Ophthalmia (/ɒpˈθælmiə/; also called ophthalmitis, and archaically obtalmy) is inflammation of the eye. It results in congestion of the eyeball, often eye-watering, redness and swelling, itching and burning, and a general feeling of irritation under the eyelids. Ophthalmia can have different causes, such as infection from bacteria, viruses, fungi, or may result from a physical trauma to the eye, chemical irritation, and allergies. A bacterial infection can result in a mucus and pus secretion. Severe cases of ophthalmia can cause blindness if not treated, especially in newborns, who contract it from the environment in the womb. Treatments vary according to the nature of the cause, with minor irritations going away on their own.

== Types ==
Types include sympathetic ophthalmia (inflammation of both eyes following trauma to one eye), gonococcal ophthalmia, trachoma or "Egyptian" ophthalmia, ophthalmia neonatorum (a conjunctivitis of the newborn due to either of the two previous pathogens), photophthalmia and actinic conjunctivitis (inflammation resulting from prolonged exposure to ultraviolet rays), and others.

== Noted historical cases ==
- Aristodemus, a Spartan captain during the Second Persian invasion of Greece, was affected by ophthalmia and was thus unable to fight at the Battle of Thermopylae (of the famous Spartan 300). However, he fought bravely and died at the Battle of Plataea. Due to the ophthalmia, and his absence from the first battle, he was not buried with proper funeral rites of a Spartan captain.
- Cicero, on 1 March 49 BC wrote to Atticus that he had ophthalmia.
- Eratosthenes, who among other things was a Greek geographer and mathematician, contracted ophthalmia as he aged, becoming blind around 195 BC, depressing him and causing him to voluntarily starve himself to death. He died in 194 BC at the age of 82.
- Hannibal's sight was lost in his right eye in 217 BC by what was likely ophthalmia. He lost the sight while crossing a swamp area on a four-day march through water early in his Italian campaign.
- Citing Galatians 4:13–15 and 6:11, Restoration Movement scholar J. W. McGarvey theorized that ophthalmia may have very well been the Apostle Paul's "thorn in the flesh" (2 Cor. 12:7).
- King John of Bohemia, who died in battle in 1346 at age 50 after being blind for a decade, lost his sight to this general condition.
- Christopher Columbus had ophthalmitis late in his life. Ophthalmitis was a common disease of sailors, possibly related to scurvy or poor nutrition. In the book Negro Builders and Heroes by Benjamin Brawley, in the chapter entitled "The Wake of the Slave-Ship", is a description of this condition affecting, on slave ships, sometimes the whole crew and captive slaves.
- Elizabeth Blackwell, physician in the United States, lost an eye from purulent ophthalmia contracted from an infant with an eye infection, while working in Paris at La Maternité (1849), and after loss of the eye she could no longer be a surgeon.
- The Spanish composer and guitar virtuoso Francisco Tárrega also had ophthalmia and seriously impaired sight after a traumatic childhood event (1850s).
- Hugh Fortescue, aka Lord Ebrington, (1818-1905), British Liberal MP and sanitary reformer, contracted ophthalmia in the course of a visit in 1856 to a barracks whilst researching sanitary conditions in the army. He lost sight in one eye.
- Richard Henry Dana Jr., author of the American classic, Two Years Before the Mast (1840), developed "a weakness of the eyes" after contracting measles while a junior at Harvard College. In an attempt to cure his condition, he undertook a two-year sailing voyage to California from Boston via Cape Horn, which provided the experiences for his memoir. The cure worked.
- Edward Rushton, 18th-century blind poet and slavery abolitionist, who founded the first blind school in the UK in 1776. He is believed to have caught ophthalmia while compassionately feeding slaves who had been isolated for it.
- Wild Bill Hickok, 1876, Hickok was diagnosed by a doctor in Kansas City, Missouri, at just 39, as his marksmanship and health were apparently in decline.
