= Copamyntis infusella =

Scientific classification
- Kingdom: Animalia
- Phylum: Arthropoda
- Clade: Pancrustacea
- Class: Insecta
- Order: Lepidoptera
- Family: Pyralidae
- Genus: Copamyntis
- Species: C. infusella

Binomial name
- Copamyntis infusella (Meyrick, 1879)

Synonyms
- Nephopteryx infusella Meyrick, 1879; Phycita bipartella Hampson, 1896; Phycita infusella (Meyrick, 1879)

Species of moth

Copamyntis infusella is a species of snout moth in the genus Copamyntis. It is found in Australia, India and Sri Lanka.

This species is a pest on cotton.

An associated Chalcididae to this species is Brachymeria rufescens.
