= Copamyntis alectryonura =

Scientific classification
- Kingdom: Animalia
- Phylum: Arthropoda
- Class: Insecta
- Order: Lepidoptera
- Family: Pyralidae
- Genus: Copamyntis
- Species: C. alectryonura

Binomial name
- Copamyntis alectryonura (Meyrick, 1932)

Synonyms
- Elegia alectryonura Meyrick, 1932; Copamyntis obliquifasciella Hampson, 1896

Species of moth

Copamyntis alectryonura is a species of snout moth in the genus Copamyntis. It was described by Edward Meyrick in 1932. It is found on Java in Indonesia.
