= Copamyntis =

Scientific classification
- Kingdom: Animalia
- Phylum: Arthropoda
- Class: Insecta
- Order: Lepidoptera
- Family: Pyralidae
- Subfamily: Phycitinae
- Tribe: Phycitini
- Genus: Copamyntis; Meyrick, 1934

Synonyms
- Compamyntis Roesler & Küppers, 1979

Genus of moths

Copamyntis is a genus of snout moths (family Pyralidae). It was erected by Edward Meyrick in 1934.

== Species ==
- Copamyntis alectryonura (Meyrick, 1932)
- Copamyntis ceroprepiella
- Copamyntis infusella (Meyrick)
- Copamyntis leptocosma
- Copamyntis martimella Kirpichnikova & Yamanaka, 2002
- Copamyntis obliquifasciella Hampson 1896
- Copamyntis prays
- Copamyntis spodoptila
