= Dr. Jenner's House =

Museum in Berkeley, Gloucestershire, England

Dr. Jenner's House, The Chantry
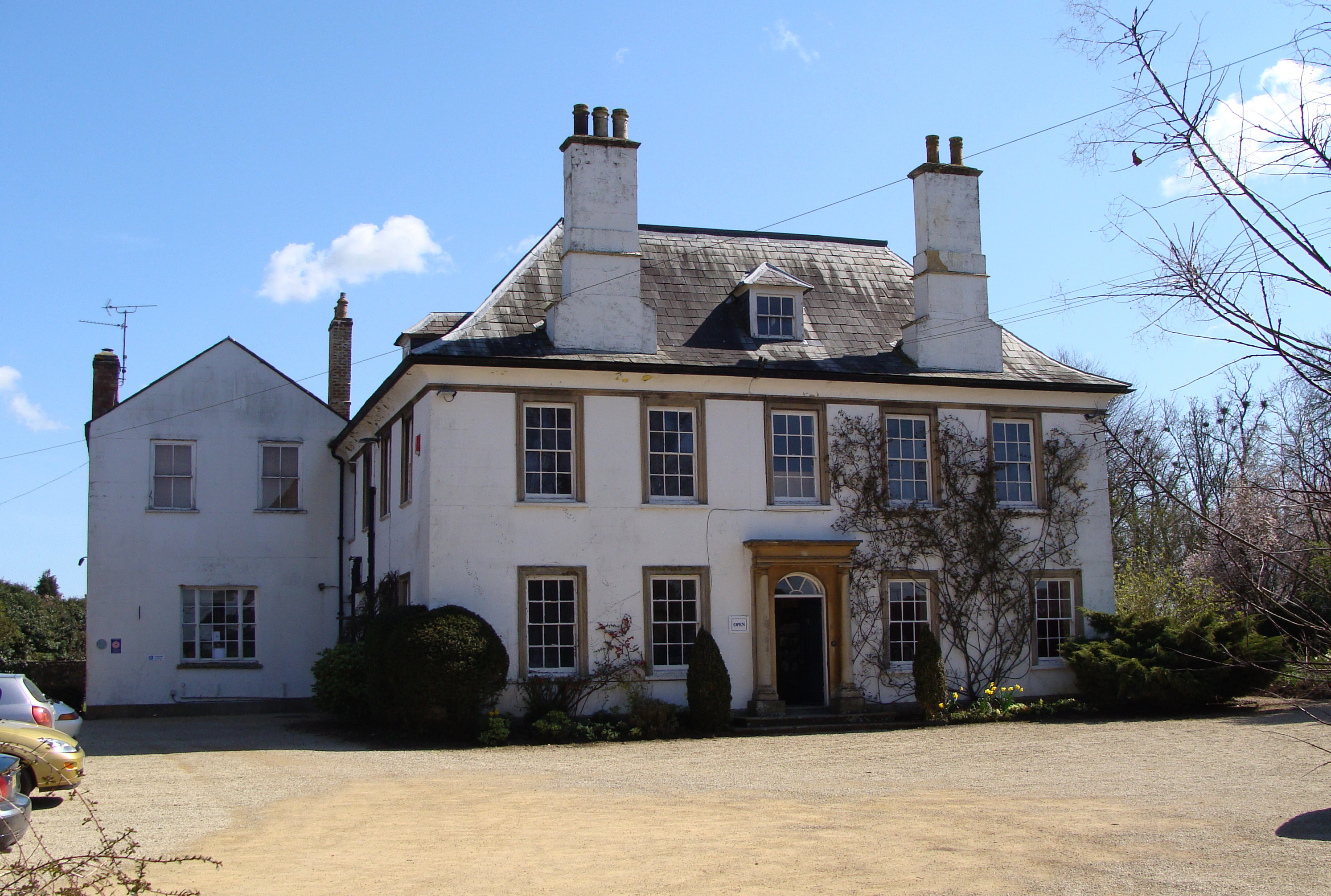
- The Chantry

- Location within Gloucestershire
- Location: Berkeley, England
- Coordinates: 51.6903°N 2.4574°W
- Website: Jenner Museum

Dr. Jenner's House, formerly known as the Edward Jenner Museum, in Berkeley, England, is housed in a grade II* listed early 18th century building called the Chantry, famous as the home of Edward Jenner FRS, physician, surgeon, and pioneer of smallpox vaccination, and now used as a museum. Jenner is acknowledged as having saved more lives than any other human, as his discovery led to the complete elimination of smallpox by 1977.

== History ==
The Chantry was built in the village of Berkeley in the early 18th century and gained its name from being built on land associated with a former community of monks, next to the village church. Edward Jenner bought the property, owned by the Weston family, in 1785, and moved there before his marriage to Catherine Kingscote in 1788. Jenner planted ivy that in later years grew up the sides of the adjacent church tower, and a grapevine in a vinery built against the Chantry. He also had the Reverend Robert Ferryman build a rustic hut at the bottom of the garden where Jenner treated the poorer families in the district. Jenner later did vaccinations in it and referred to it as "the Temple of Vaccinia".

Prior to this invention, smallpox was a global killer with mortality rates of 60% for adults and 80% for children, and it was a safer alternative to the existing 'variolation' method, which had a dangerous 2% mortality rate and was infectious.

Jenner was living at the Chantry when he conducted the first ever vaccinations in 1796 and 1798, which showed the potential for the control of smallpox. The first controlled experiment took place on 14 May 1796 in the hut, where he inoculated James Phipps, his gardener's 8-year-old son, with pus from cowpox blisters taken from Sarah Nelmes, a milkmaid who had contracted the virus from the cow Blossom. After Phipps recovered, a subsequent reinfection with smallpox material proved him to be immune. After testing his method on 23 individuals and publishing his findings, his theory of vaccination was instantly taken up globally. Although Jenner briefly maintained homes in Cheltenham and London, the Chantry remained his principal residence until his death in 1823. In 1876, Jenner's descendants sold the house to the Church of England, who used it as the local vicarage.

== Museum ==
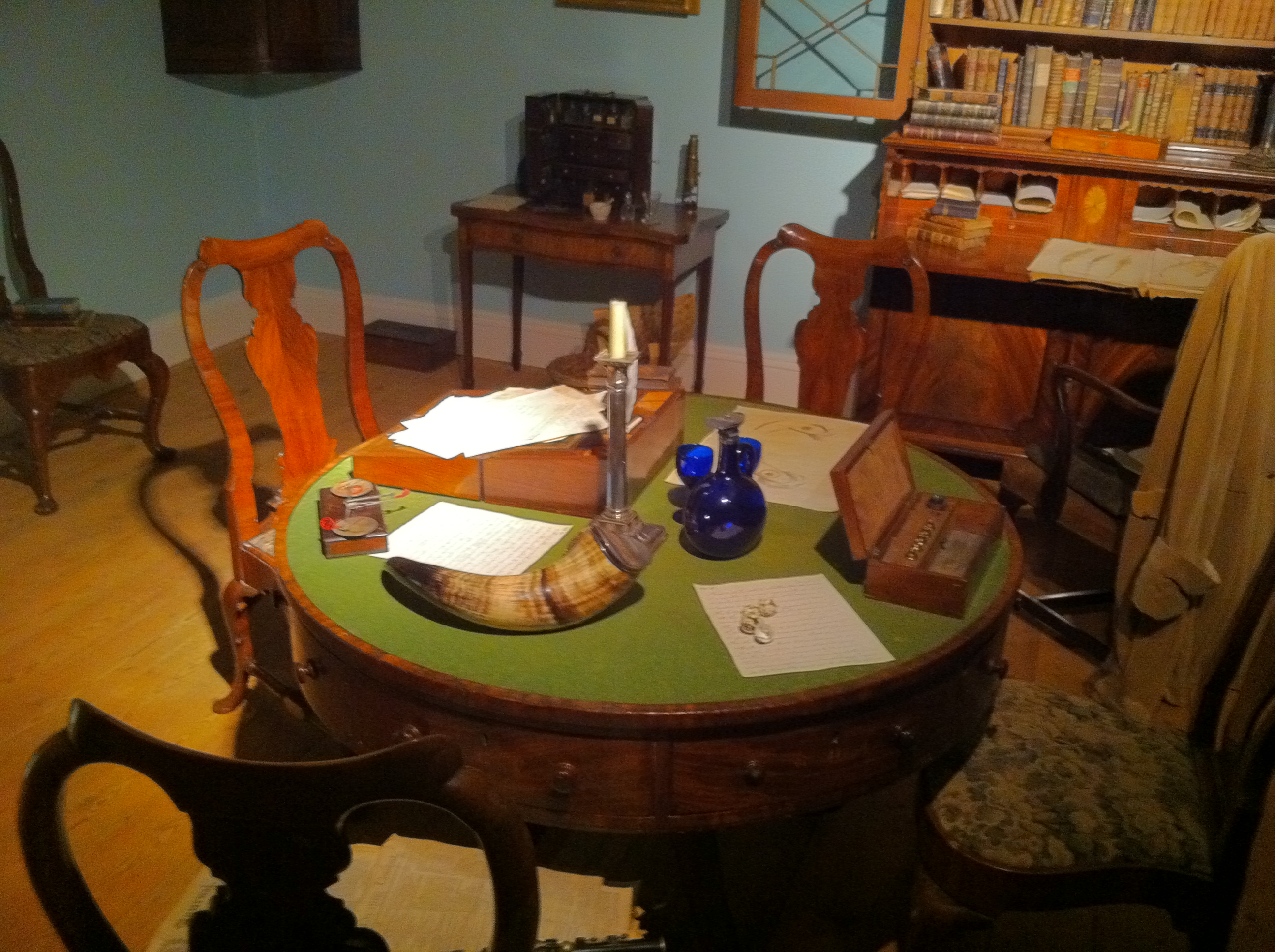
Edward Jenner's study, furnished with his belongings as in 1823

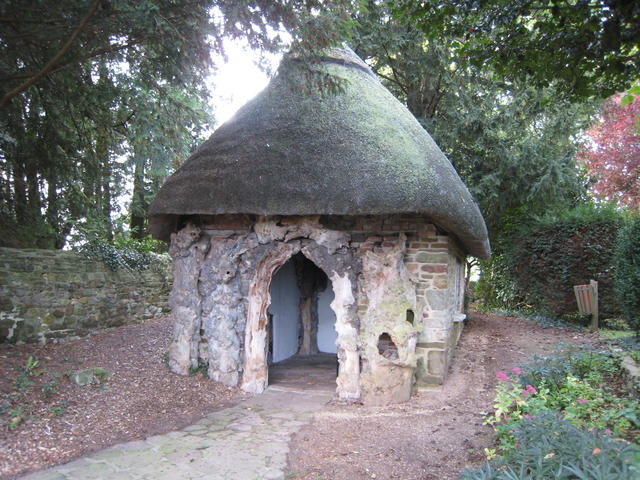
Temple of Vaccinia

Edward Jenner's study, furnished with his belongings as in 1823 Temple of Vaccinia In 1985 the Chantry was purchased by the Edward Jenner Museum, dedicated to the work of the doctor and wider immunology; the Japanese businessman Ryoichi Sasakawa donated a significant sum to enable the acquisition. Restoration work was gradually carried out over the following years, allowing more of the building to be opened to the public. The rustic hut, the "Temple of Vaccinia", was used by Jenner to continue providing vaccinations free of charge to the poor of the district and is considered by many to be the birthplace of public health.

The chantry building holds grade II* listed status, as does the rustic "Temple of Vaccinia" in the garden.

In 2025, the hut was placed on the Heritage at Risk Register, needing repairs to its thatched roof, rear wall and chimney. It is due to repoen in May 2026 following restoration.

== Bibliography ==
- Baron, John (1838). The Life of Edward Jenner. Vol. 2. London: Henry Colburn. OCLC 654980884.
