= Copamyntis martimella =

Scientific classification
- Domain: Eukaryota
- Kingdom: Animalia
- Phylum: Arthropoda
- Class: Insecta
- Order: Lepidoptera
- Family: Pyralidae
- Genus: Copamyntis
- Species: C. martimella

Binomial name
- Copamyntis martimella Kirpichnikova & Yamanaka, 2002

Species of moth

Copamyntis martimella is a species of snout moth in the genus Copamyntis. It was described by Valentina A. Kirpichnikova and Hiroshi Yamanaka in 2002 and is known from Primorsky Krai, Russia.
