= Copamyntis ceroprepiella =

Scientific classification
- Kingdom: Animalia
- Phylum: Arthropoda
- Clade: Pancrustacea
- Class: Insecta
- Order: Lepidoptera
- Family: Pyralidae
- Genus: Copamyntis
- Species: C. ceroprepiella

Binomial name
- Copamyntis ceroprepiella (Hampson, 1901)

Synonyms
- Salebria ceroprepiella Hampson, 1901

Species of moth

Copamyntis ceroprepriella is a species of snout moth in the genus Copamyntis. It is found in Australia.
