= Copamyntis prays =

Scientific classification
- Domain: Eukaryota
- Kingdom: Animalia
- Phylum: Arthropoda
- Class: Insecta
- Order: Lepidoptera
- Family: Pyralidae
- Genus: Copamyntis
- Species: C. prays

Binomial name
- Copamyntis prays (Turner, 1947)

Synonyms
- Tylchares prays Turner, 1947

Species of moth

Copamyntis prays is a species of snout moth in the genus Copamyntis. It is found in Australia.
