= Anton Kliegl =

Businessman

Anton Tiberius Kliegl
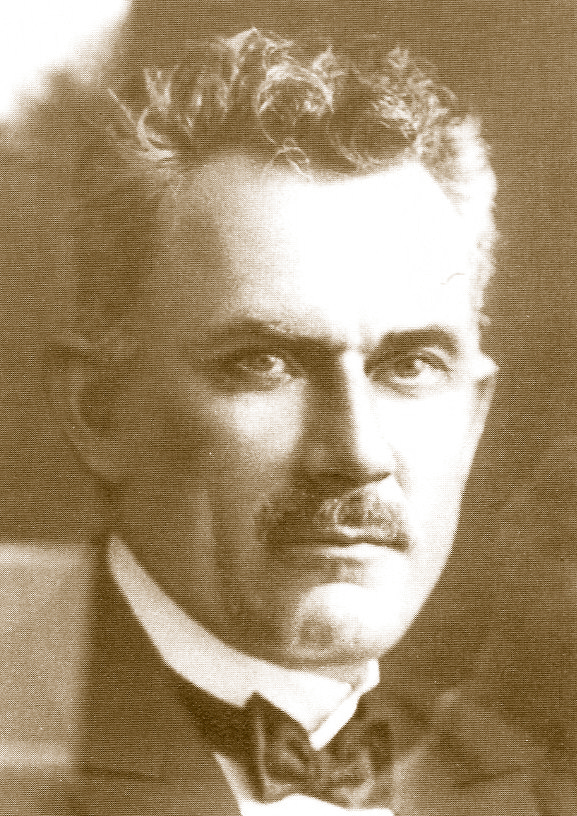
- Born: September 15, 1872; Bad Kissingen, Bavaria, German Empire
- Died: May 19, 1927 (aged 54); Bad Kissingen, Germany
- Citizenship: German, then American
- Occupations: Plumber, businessman, inventor
- Organization: Kliegl Brothers Universal Electric Stage Lighting Company
- Known for: Invention of Klieg light
- Spouse: Leopoldine Herbig (m. 1902)
- Children: 0
- Relatives: Johann Kliegl (1869–1959; brother, business partner)
- Website: klieglbros.com

Anton Tiberius Kliegl (September 15, 1872 – May 19, 1927) was a German–American businessman and inventor.

== Life and work ==
Kliegl was one of eight children of the spa musician Adam Tiberius Kliegl and his wife Therese Ströhlein. Anton Kliegl's grandfather Johann Kliegl came with his orchestra from Bohemia to Bad Kissingen in 1836, where he founded the Kurorchester Bad Kissingen ("Bad Kissingen Spa Orchestra") in 1837.

In 1893, Anton Kliegl, then 21 years old and trained as a plumber, followed his elder brother Johann (1869–1959) to New York City, United States. Johann had emigrated earlier, in 1888. There they both worked in a factory which manufactured electric arc lamps. They bought the factory in 1896, and renamed it as their own company, Kliegl Brothers Universal Electric Stage Lighting Company. The company specialized in stage technology and stage effects, which they themselves designed. The company was one of the first of its kind.

On December 27, 1902, Kliegl married Leopoldine Herbig. They had no children.

In 1911 Kliegl invented the carbon arc lamp still known as Klieg light, which produced double the brightness with the same energy needs as contemporary lamps of that time, and was specifically used for stage lighting and filming. In the silent film era he developed many new special effects for movies such as Ben Hur and Wizard of Oz.

Kliegl gave generous donations to his home town of Bad Kissingen – the Kliegl children's park, the Anton Kliegl Elementary School, feeding the poor, a nursery, a children's recreation center, and the interior of the council hall in the Old Town Hall benefited from his generosity.

Kliegl died in Bad Kissingen in 1927 and is buried in the Woodlawn Cemetery in the Bronx, New York.

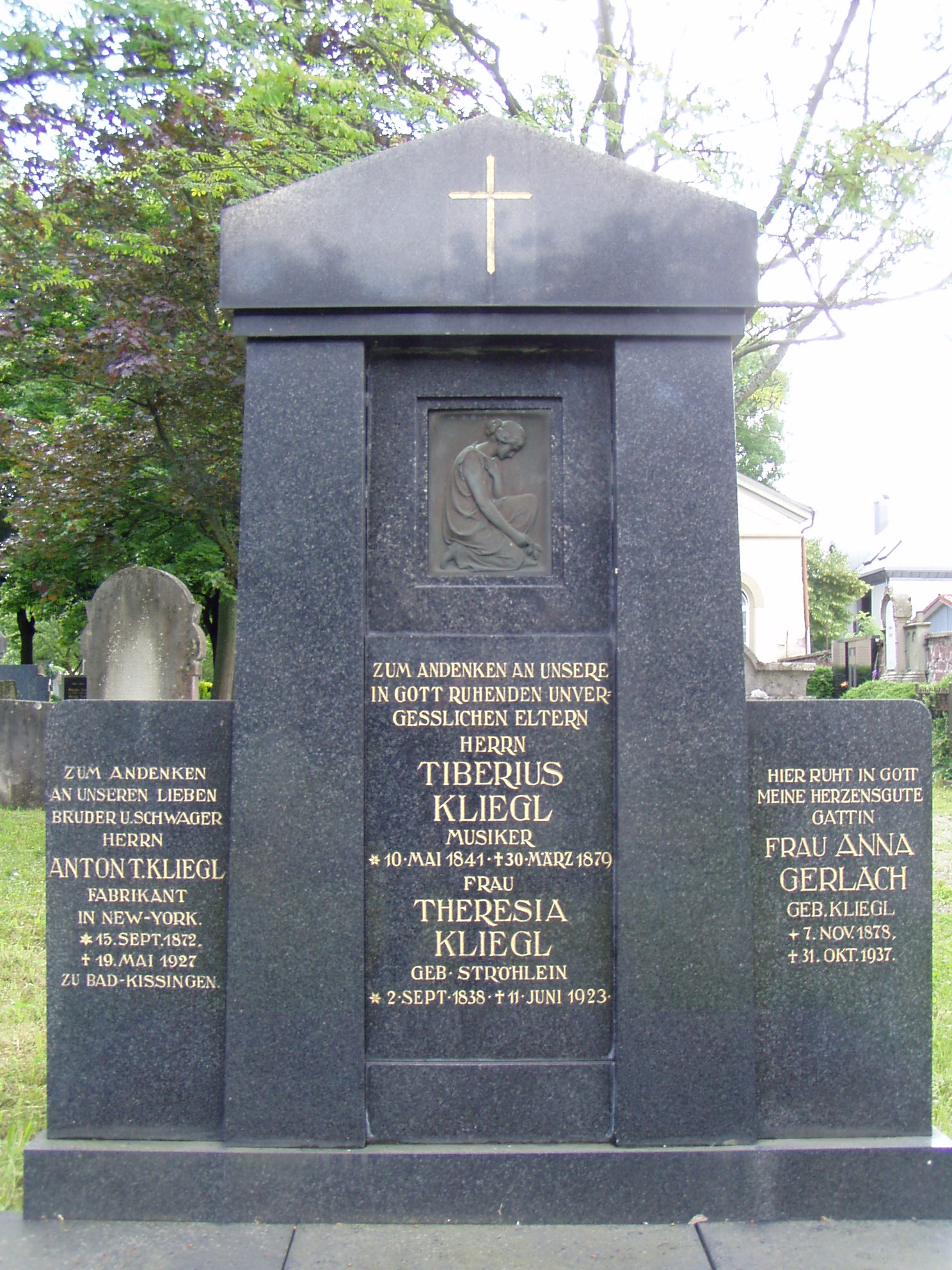
Kliegl family tomb with a memorial stone for Anton Kliegl (Kapellenfriedhof, Bad Kissingen)

== Honors ==
- Bad Kissingen has a Kliegl-Platz ("Kliegl Square"). It was redesigned in 2009, and a Kliegl-Brunnen ("Kliegl Fountain") was added.
- The Anton Kliegl Elementary School (Anton Kliegl Middle School since 2010) still exists in Bad Kissingen.
- The city of Bad Kissingen awarded Kliegl an honorary citizenship in 1922.
