= Kliegl Brothers Universal Electric Stage Lighting Company =

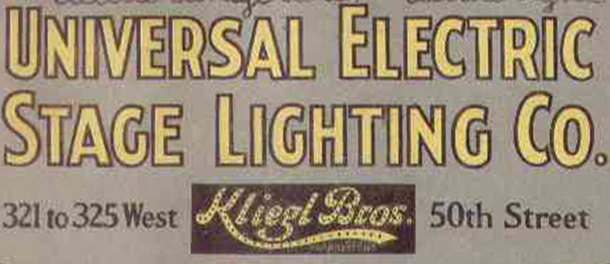
- Company logo from the 1922 catalog
- Industry: Stage lighting
- Founded: New York City, United States (1896)
- Founder: Anton Kliegl, Johann Kliegl
- Defunct: 1996
- Headquarters: Manhattan, New York City, United States
- Products: Electric stage lighting products
- Parent: Myerhofer Electric Stage Lighting Company
- Website: klieglbros.com

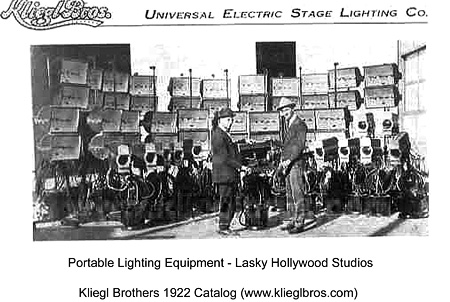
An illustration from Kliegl Brothers' 1922 catalog, depicting portable lighting equipment used at Lasky Hollywood Studios

Kliegl Brothers Universal Electric Stage Lighting Company was an American manufacturer of electrical stage lighting products in the 20th century. The company had a significant influence in the development of theatrical, cinema, television, and specialty lighting. It equipped many major performing venues in the United States and its products were used in several other countries as well. Their eponymous product, the Klieglight, was the trade name for two quite different production lights manufactured by the company, and survives today in both industry argot and in popular idiom as a synonym for "spotlight" or "center of attention".

== History ==
=== Origins ===
The company was founded in 1896 in New York City when a Bavarian immigrant, Anton Kliegl, in partnership with A. H. Guendel, purchased the Myerhofer Electric Stage Lighting Company, and renamed it the Universal Electric Stage Lighting Company. A year later his older brother Johann Kliegl replaced Guendel, and the firm became known as the Kliegl Brothers Universal Electric Stage Lighting Company. From its infancy as a firm so small that its proprietors also worked as stagehands to supplement their income, it grew to be one of the largest firms in North America manufacturing lighting and control equipment for the theatre and television stage.

=== Factories ===
In the beginning, the firm occupied the Meyerhofer facilities in the old Star Theatre at 842 Broadway, New York City. By 1901 they had moved to 1393-95 Broadway/129 West 38th Street. After the loss of this plant to fire on August 15, 1911, they moved again, this time to 240 West 50th Street, and in September 1921, they built and occupied their own four-story plus basement factory at 321-325 West 50th Street. In 1962 they moved to a new, modern two-story plant at 32-32 48th Avenue in Long Island City. By 1966 an annex had been opened two blocks away to meet the press of business. By 1966 "NY/LA" appeared on drawing title blocks, denoting their last expansion, the opening of a branch sales/engineering office in Los Angeles under George Howard. By 1979 "LA" had vanished from the title blocks. After 1980, the company's business began to decline, and by the mid-1980s they had moved to a smaller plant at 5 Aerial Way, Syosset, Long Island, New York. In 1996 the company filed for bankrupt and closed.

=== Management ===
Johann Kliegl was born in 1869, and his brother Anton in 1872, in Bad Kissingen, Bavaria, Germany. Johann, trained as a locksmith, emigrated to the United States in 1888, and Anton, trained as a plumber, followed him there in 1893. There they both started working in a factory which manufactured electric arc lamps.

Throughout their lives, the two brothers maintained close ties to Bad Kissingen, and endowed there a school, still extant, and grown to encompass grade, middle and high school divisions. Many of their employees were brought over from Bad Kissingen, such that the "patois" on the factory floor was known to the staff as "50th Street Deutsch". Anton, in fact, died in Bad Kissengen on May 19, 1927.

Management was retained by the Kliegl family throughout the history of the firm. Johann remained active until a few days prior to his death on September 30, 1959. His son, Herbert Kliegl, was by that time the managing head of the firm, and remained so until a few weeks before his death on October 3, 1968. Control then passed to Herbert's son John H. Kliegl II. By 1992 the firm was in Chapter 11, and a stockbroker, Richard Davisson, took complete ownership and control, replacing John Kliegl II with Al Vitale. The firm ceased operations in November 1996.

=== Products ===
At the time of the firm's founding, electric lighting for the stage was in its infancy. According to author McDonald Watkins Held, and cited by Dr. Joel Rubin, there was "...no catalog of stage lighting equipment earlier than Kliegl's catalog of 1898." Indeed, it may be inferred that the use of "Electric" in the company's name was intended to distinguish its products from the illuminating gas or acetylene fueled lime light equipment they would replace. Many of what became common devices, such as the stage "shoe" or thrust plug and the disappearing footlight were patented by the Kliegls, and many others were developed into the forms still familiar today Initially they continued the Myerhofer business as "contractors and manufacturers", as noted in their Catalog G of 1913. In 1903 they furnished and installed the complete stage lighting system for the Metropolitan Opera Company's new home on West 37th Street (John was at the time an electrician for the Met). In 1933 they would be again called to provide a complete new stage lighting system, although not as installers. Catalog G also displayed the carbon arc floodlight, developed by the firm in 1911, as the iconic Klieglight. A diverse assortment of lighting and electrical products were also cataloged, such as exit signs, backup batteries, dimmer boards, connectors, effect projectors, chandeliers, marquee lights (and complete marquees), charging outlets for electric cars, switchboards, etc. Featured was a "Skyrocket" sign for Tilyou's Steeplechase Park in Coney Island. The development of electrical standards was spurred, in part, by the Iroquois Theatre fire of 1903. Kliegl Brothers' Catalog E states that "plugs and receptacles are in accordance with Underwriter's requirements and pass city inspections"page 10. The Kliegls maintained a direct interest in the development of standards for theatre electrical systems. From 1950 to his death, Herbert Kliegl was a member of the National Fire Protection Association (NFPA) code making panel No. 115. A precursor of today's spotlights, the "baby spotlight", their first using an incandescent lamp, was introduced in their Catalog E of 1906. The takeover of the incandescent lamp would be inexorable. From about 1908, motion picture studios were using the company's floor-stand arc lamps, which allowed for point-source lighting, including some of the first low-light effects; the shadow produced by the two pairs of carbon rods can be seen in some early films. In their 1922 catalog, the company was still featuring its motion picture studio equipment, but by 1926, references to motion picture applications had dwindled to a single line of type on the first page. In 1924 they introduced the use of glass rondels as color media in border and footlights, eliminating coloring of individual lamps.

Kliegl Brothers introduced its Fresnel lens spots in 1929, and by 1935 were ordering their own Fresnel lenses from Corning.

Pages devoted to Kliegl products in the 1928/29 catalogs of retailers such as Holzmueller on the west coast and wholesalers like Marle in Stamford, Connecticut, showed that their sales now extended well beyond their own factory. The condensed catalog of 1929 for the first time lists a broader range of "Mazda" (incandescent lamps) than arc spots. By 1930, the "Mazda" name has vanished, yielding to "incandescents".

In 1932, the Kliegl brothers installed their new ellipsoidal reflector spotlights in the Center Theatre in Radio City. Based on the new GE T14 medium bipost lamps, these had triple the efficiency of the standard plano convex spots. They were demonstrated to a meeting of the Illuminating Engineering Society on April 19, 1933page 186 and introduced as a standard product in Catalog B of 1933 as "Klieglights" page 187, note 75 and billed on pages 42–45 of Catalog 40 of 1936 as "The New Klieglight".

Catalog 40 of 1936 introduced a full line of architectural downlights (individual architectural products had been made for some time), the autotransformer dimmer (originally dubbed the "Transtat", the catalog was overstamped, changing the trade name to "Autrastat"), motor operated dimmers, Fresnel lens spots, etc. At the same time, the more obsolete and exotic products began to disappear.

This catalog also introduced "Alzak" reflectors, Alzak being a proprietary process for producing a mirror-like finish on aluminium. Under agreement with the process owner, Alcoa, Kliegl Brothers created reflectors using the Alzak process for their own use and for sale at the Kliegl Reflector Company, a separate subsidiary plant located on 11th Avenue between 33rd and 34th streets (opposite the location of the present Javits Center). Major was the only other licensee for stage lighting reflectors.page 205

An interesting specialty, prominently featured in this catalog, but dating to the first catalog, was the effect projector, in which rotating, hand painted, transparent discs rotated before projector spots. Precise optical lenses spread the image to beam lighted patterns or images, ranging from a simple snowfall to the elaborate "Christ Rising to Heaven with Three Angels", onto a stage backdrop. Six artists sat before the tall 50th Street windows on the third floor hand painting the tiny images which would be magnified many times when in use.pagees 10-11 These were used not only on stage, but also in architectural applications. By 1960, effect projectors had been made obsolete by film, and later, computer-generated projections.

By catalog T61, issued in 1954, the arc spots were represented by a single model, while the Klieglight line offered models ranging from 250 watt to 3000 watt spots. The company was also offering their "Dynabeam" lensed follow spot, and Fresnel lanterns ranging from 100 to 2000 watts. In that era of patch panels and small numbers of high wattage dimmers, Kliegl Brothers offered its "Safpatch" patch panels, and "Rotolector" rotary power switches, both developed by Herbert Kliegl. Both products interlocked the electrical contacts with a circuit breaker, preventing arcs while switching or patching. From the beginning of the firm's operations, custom products were readily available. Indeed, the craft shop system used throughout its history made little differentiation between custom and standard products. High-end lighting designers regularly sought out Kliegl Brothers, who could design and produce the hardware that would fulfill their visions. Often, the custom product made its mark on the industry, such as the wall washers designed for the UN General Assembly room, or the fluorescent wall washers for New York's Pan American (now Met Life) building lobby, both designed by Herbert Kliegl. A custom oddity was the scoreboard designed for Madison Square Garden, across 50th Street from the factory. This remained in use until the relocation of the Garden to its current home atop Penn Station.

Until 1959 Kliegl provided controls as an assembler of equipment purchased or licensed from others. Resistance plates and variable brush autotransformers were largely purchased from Ward Leonard; magnetic amplifiers from General Electric. Thyratron dimmers were manufactured under license from Strand Electric of England. All this started to change in 1958.

In 1959 the first commercially viable solid state theatre dimmer, Kliegl's SCR(R), was introduced as model R59. Improved models followed. Within two years, the solid state dimmer had, as a practical matter, swept away all other dimming systems.

In the 1960s, like other theatrical suppliers, the company was making more from amateur theatre companies than from either film or professional theatre.

In 1970, Kliegl began to import computerized control desks, known as the QFile, from Thorn of Great Britain. The first of those control boards were purchased for the MGM Grand Hotel, in Las Vegas, followed shortly thereafter for the San Francisco Opera, and other major venues. It was moderately successful, primarily because sales were limited to QFile's high costs for such equipment, a single desk selling for upwards of $100,000. Thorn/Kliegl boards continued to evolve and the costs began moderate, but they were still beyond the reach of all but major colleges and universities.

Around 1975, Broadway's first computerized control console was designed for the musical "Chorus Line" on the Broadway stage by Electronics Diversified, a small Portland, Oregon company. The conceptualizer, and design engineer for the board was Gordon Pearlman, who left EDI shortly thereafter, and was hired by Kliegl in late 1975 or early 1976. In mid-1976, Pearlman, along with his longtime partner and colleague, Steve Carlson, designed and built the first of many successful, so-called moderately-priced computer consoles for Kliegl, called the Performance. Harrahs became the first buyer for the product, which at the time was simply known as the "Lower Cost Computer Board." That first Performance, essentially a one-off, was installed in the Lounge at Harrah's Lake Tahoe. Harrah's subsequently purchased a second board for it main showroom a year later, and yet another for its Reno showroom. By that time the Performance boards found great success around the world for its clean, modular design.

Another one-off, was developed for ABC-TV, Hollywood, when they requested a console capable of combining the control of multiple channels, and it became the Performancea SofPatch.

By the late 70's, or perhaps 1980, Kliegl brought out the Performer, at the time the only portable computer console, and it found success at every level of the market. The first purchaser of that product - for five boards - was a rental house, Olesen in Hollywood, which did place it in its rental inventory.

The successor to that first Performance board continued to evolve, culminating in the Grand Performance, which was capable of controlling virtually an unlimited numbers of control channels (dimmers). One of the earliest Grand Permance's was installed in Mexico City at the Congreso, the government's main parliament hall. That board controlled almost one thousand of Kliegl's latest dimmers - the compact K96. The K96 was another landmark product developed by Pearlman and Carlson, and became an essential item in the Kliegl catalog. When that first installation was purchased, again, it was simply known as "The New Compact Dimmer," and was another one-off was developed especially for the Mexico project. The K96 became a critical product, because its main competitor at time, Strand Electric was dominating the market with its own compact dimmer, which had begun deliveries a few years earlier.

In 1977, the company received permission from the Canadian government to start a Toronto subsidiary.

The 1978 series of catalog brochures shows that product development had significantly slowed. By the mid-1980s, attempts to build the next generation modern control console had failed. Luminaire and accessory lines had further narrowed, and the trend was inexorable. Unable to compete in a world of low-cost mass production, the firm finally ceased operations in 1996.

=== Klieg light ===
The first "Klieg light" was a powerful carbon arc light designed for the motion picture industry. It was not the first arc light offered by the company (arc floods are offered in their bulletin "Stage Lighting Apparatus and Effects of Every Description", published prior to 1906), and nor was it a spotlight. Its first listing is in Catalog G of 1913, where it is shown as a horizontal wide flood. None of the surviving catalogs, through to its disappearance from the company's product line, describe any other lighting instrument as a "Klieglight", with all arc spotlights uniformly described as "arc spotlights". "Klieglight", however, reappears on pages 42–45 of Catalog 40 of 1936 as the name of their new line of ellipsoidal reflector incandescent spotlights, and this usage continued as long as the company was in existence. Oddly enough, the company apparently did not attempt to trademark the name, although there was a filing for a logo that was never carried through.

== Major projects ==
The following is a representative sampling of major projects undertaken by Kliegl Brothers:

- Metropolitan Opera at 37th Street, New York City (1903 and 1933); replacements thereafter
- Roxy Theatre, stage lighting
- CEA Movie Studios, Madrid, Spain
- Madison Square Garden at 50th Street, NYC
- Metropolitan Opera at Lincoln Center, architectural lighting
- Radio City Music Hall
- Jones Beach Marine Theatre
- 666 5th Avenue, New York City, exterior lighting
- RCA Building at Rockefeller Center, exterior lighting
- Philharmonic Hall, (Avery Fisher Hall) Lincoln Center, architectural lighting (1962)
- Place des Arts, Montreal (1963)
- New York State Theatre, Lincoln Center (1964)
- Los Angeles Music Center (1965)
- CBS Studios 31 & 3, Los Angeles (1967, 70)
- Moscow World Trade Center (1971)
- ABC TV 66th and 67th Street Studios, New York City
- NBC TV studios, Hollywood
- Teatro Teresa Careno, Caracas, Venezuela
- State Opera House (Staatsoper), Vienna, Austria
- Ernie Pyle Theatre, Tokyo, Japan
