= Actinic conjunctivitis =

Inflammation of the conjunctiva by ultraviolet damage

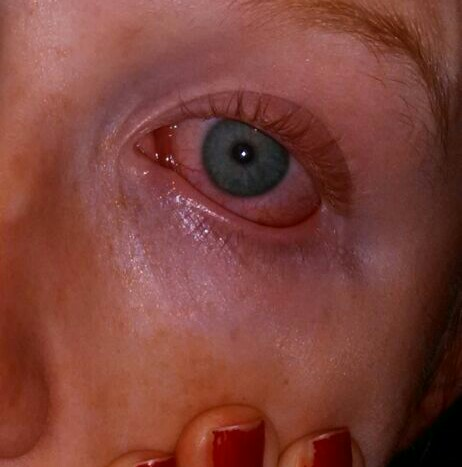
- Actinic conjunctivitis causes a redness of the eyes, as well as swelling and often greyness around the eyes.

Actinic conjunctivitis is an inflammation of the eye contracted from prolonged exposure to actinic (ultraviolet) rays. Symptoms are redness and swelling of the eyes. Most often the condition is caused by prolonged exposure to Klieg lights, therapeutic lamps or acetylene torches. Other names for the condition include Klieg eye, eyeburn, arc-flash, welder's conjunctivitis, flash keratoconjunctivitis, actinic ray ophthalmia, X-ray ophthalmia and ultraviolet ray ophthalmia.

== Symptoms and signs ==
Conjunctivitis eye condition contracted from exposure to actinic rays. Symptoms are redness and swelling.

== Causes ==
Conjunctivitis is prevalent among children of the highlands of Ecuador. The finding supports the hypothesis that prolonged exposure to the sun at altitude, in the less dense atmosphere (with the resultant lower UV absorption), is one cause of the condition.

== Diagnosis ==
The diagnostic process of Actinic conjunctivitis stems from a doctor check-up once symptoms of redness, itching, or infection become evident in one or both eyes. In addition to the doctor inquiring about your symptoms, the medical appointment can consist of a slit lamp examination to observe the eye closely and in some cases an eye surface swabbing with fluorescein to test for foreign agents in the eye.

== Management ==
The wearing of sunglasses and avoiding prolonged sun exposure are the two main ways to prevent actinic conjunctivitis. Once the patient contracts this conjunctivitis, however, the symptoms can be treated with cyclosporine A and other steroids. On more advanced lesions, surgery may be necessary.

== See also ==
- Conjunctivitis
- Photokeratitis
