= Actinism =

Property of solar radiation

Actinism is the property of solar radiation that leads to the production of photochemical and photobiological effects. It is important in chemical photography and x-ray imaging, and causes sunburn and photodegradation of materials. Actinic chemicals include silver salts used in photography and other light-sensitive chemicals.

The word actinism is derived from the Ancient Greek ἀκτίς, ἀκτῖνος ('ray, beam').

== In chemistry ==
In chemical terms, actinism is the property of radiation that lets it be absorbed by a molecule and cause a photochemical reaction as a result. Albert Einstein was the first to correctly theorize that each photon would be able to cause only one molecular reaction. This distinction separates photochemical reactions from exothermic reduction reactions triggered by radiation.

For general purposes, photochemistry is the commonly used vernacular rather than actinic or actino-chemistry, which are again more commonly seen used for photography or imaging.

== In medicine ==
In medicine, actinic effects are generally described in terms of the dermis or outer layers of the body, such as eyes (see: Actinic conjunctivitis) and upper tissues that the sun would normally affect, rather than deeper tissues that higher-energy shorter-wavelength radiation such as x-ray and gamma might affect. Actinic is also used to describe medical conditions that are triggered by exposure to light, especially UV light (see actinic keratosis).

The term actinic rays is used to refer to this phenomenon.

== In biology ==
In biology, actinic light denotes light from solar or other sources that can cause photochemical reactions such as photosynthesis in a species.

== In photography ==
Actinic light was first commonly used in early photography to distinguish light that would expose the monochrome films from light that would not. A non-actinic safe-light (e.g., red or amber) could be used in a darkroom without risk of exposing (fogging) light-sensitive films, plates or papers.

Early "non colour-sensitive" (NCS) films, plates and papers were only sensitive to the high-energy end of the visible spectrum from green to UV (shorter-wavelength light). This would render a print of the red areas as a very dark tone because the red light was not actinic. Typically, light from xenon flash lamps is highly actinic, as is daylight as both contain significant green-to-UV light.

In the first half of the 20th century, developments in film technology produced films sensitive to red and yellow light, known as orthochromatic and panchromatic, and extended that through to near infra-red light. These gave a truer reproduction of human perception of lightness across the color spectrum. In photography, therefore, actinic light must now be referenced to the photographic material in question.

== In manufacturing ==
Actinic inspection of masks in computer chip manufacture refers to inspecting the mask with the same wavelength of light that the lithography system will use.

== In aquaculture ==
Actinic lights are also common in the reef aquarium industry. They are used to promote coral and invertebrate growth. They are also used to accentuate the fluorescence of fluorescent fish.

Actinic lighting is also used to limit algae growth in the aquarium. Since algae (like many other plants), flourish in shallower warm water, algae cannot effectively photosynthesize from blue and violet light, thus actinic light minimizes its photosynthetic benefit.

Actinic lighting is also a great alternative to black lights as it provides a "night environment" for the fish, while still allowing enough light for coral and other marine life to grow. Aesthetically, they make fluorescent coral "pop" to the eye, but in some cases also to promote the growth of deeper-water coral adapted to photosynthesis in regions of the ocean dominated by blue light.

== In artificial lighting ==
"Actinic" lights are a high-color-temperature blue light. They are also used in electric fly killers to attract flies. The center wavelength for most actinic light products is 420 nanometers, with longer wavelengths regarded as "royal blue" (450nm) to sky blue (470nm) and cyan (490nm) and shorter wavelengths regarded as "violet" (400nm) and blacklight (365nm). Actinic light centered at 420nm may appear to the naked eye as a color between deep blue and violet.

== See also ==
- Spectral sensitivity is commonly used to describe the actinic responsivity of photographic materials.
- Ionizing radiation
