= Johann Kliegl =

Johann Hugo "John" Kliegl
- Born: October 13, 1869; Bad Kissingen, Bavaria
- Died: September 30, 1959 (aged 89); New York City, United States
- Citizenship: German, then American
- Occupations: Locksmith, businessman, inventor
- Organization: Kliegl Brothers Universal Electric Stage Lighting Company
- Spouse: Anna Schlund (m. 1899)
- Children: Alfred Hugo (b. 1900), Franzes Julia (b. 1901), Herbert Anton (b. 1904), Anna Beatrix (b. 1907)
- Relatives: Anton Kliegl (1872–1927; brother, business partner)
- Website: klieglbros.com

Johann Hugo "John" Kliegl (October 13, 1869 – September 30, 1959) was a German–American businessman and inventor.

== Life and work ==
Kliegl was one of eight children of the spa musician Adam Tiberius Kliegl and his wife Therese Ströhlein. Johann Kliegl's grandfather Johann Kliegl came with his orchestra from Bohemia to Bad Kissingen in 1836, where he founded the Kurorchester Bad Kissingen ("Bad Kissingen Spa Orchestra") in 1837.

In 1888, Johann Kliegl, trained as a locksmith, emigrated to New York City, United States. His brother Anton followed him there in 1893. There they both worked in a factory which manufactured electric arc lamps. They bought the factory in 1896, and renamed it as their own company, Kliegl Brothers Universal Electric Stage Lighting Company. The company specialized in stage technology and stage effects, which they themselves designed. The company was one of the first of its kind.

On May 27, 1899, Kliegl married Anna Schlund (b. 1878 in Dürrwangen). They had four children – Alfred Hugo (b. 1900), Franzes Julia (b. 1901), Herbert Anton (b. 1904), and Anna Beatrix (b. 1907).

The city of Bad Kissingen awarded Kliegl an honorary citizenship in 1922. Johann Kliegl participated in his brother Anton's philanthropic activities in Bad Kissingen and continued them after the latter's death in 1927.
