= William Douglass (physician) =

American physician

William Douglass (c. 1691–1752) was a physician in 18th-century Boston, Massachusetts, who wrote pamphlets on medicine, economics and politics that were often polemical. He was a central figure, along with Cotton Mather, during the controversy surrounding the 1721 smallpox epidemic in Boston.

== Personal life ==
Douglass was born in Gifford, Scotland in about 1691. Douglass studied at Edinburgh (MA, 1705), Leyden, Paris, and Utrecht, where he received his MD in 1712. He first arrived in Boston in 1716, with letters of introduction to Increase Mather, Cotton Mather and Benjamin Colman. After travelling in the West Indies, Douglass returned to Boston in 1718, where he lived for the rest of his life. Douglass prospered in Boston, and put his money into property, both in the city and in remote parts of the Massachusetts Bay colony. Although he owned houses in Boston, he lived at the Green Dragon Tavern, which he also owned. In 1746 Douglass offered the town of New Sherburn, where he had purchased a large quantity of land, $500 and thirty acres, with a house and barn, to be used to establish free schools in the town, in exchange for the town changing its name to Douglas.

In common with other educated men of the time, William Douglass pursued a wide range of interests. He corresponded with Cadwallader Colden for twenty-five years about subjects such as botany and geography, as well as medicine. He knew five languages, accumulated a collection of 1,100 American plants, observed the weather, and studied magnetic deviation and astronomy. His almanac Mercurius Novanglicanus, published in 1743, has been called "useful" and "good". His map of New England, which was published posthumously, was, at least in part, the basis for every map of New England published over the following fifty years.

Douglass did not always fit in well with Boston society. He was a self-proclaimed "rationalist", and quickly joined in the growing dissent against official Puritanism in Boston. He was probably a member of the group of freethinkers (the "hell fire club") that contributed to The New-England Courant published by James Franklin. He engaged in economic, political and medical controversies. Douglass never married, but had an illegitimate son (born in 1745) whom he adopted, causing a scandal in society.

Although Douglass was a member of what may have been the first medical society in America, formed in Boston around 1735, he did not always get along with his fellow physicians. In 1721 Douglass described himself as the only physician in Boston with a medical degree. He complained about the system that allowed someone with as little as a one-year apprenticeship with any sort of medical practitioner to present himself as a physician. He claimed that his fellow physicians were a major cause of death for their patients, and that they too often relied on a single treatment, such as bloodletting or emetics, for all conditions. He is believed to be the author of a pseudonymous proposal in 1737 to register all medical practitioners in the province of Massachusetts Bay. He instructed John Sprague in medicine.

William Douglass died in Boston on 21 October 1752.

== Smallpox inoculation controversy ==
During the 1721 Boston smallpox epidemic, Cotton Mather learned of the Turkish practice of inoculation to control the severity of smallpox, accounts of which had been published that year in the Philosophical Transactions of the Royal Society (William Douglas claimed to have loaned those issues of the Transactions to Mather). Mather urged that inoculation for smallpox be practiced in Boston. William Douglass, along with almost all of Boston's physicians, opposed inoculation. Mather and Douglass attacked each other personally, and publicly through newspapers like The Boston Gazette and The New-England Courant respectively. By the next year, however, Douglass admitted that the inoculations were safer and more effective than he had believed they would be in 1721, and he eventually performed them himself, although he remained on bad terms with Mather.

== Epidemic of 1735/1736 ==
In 1735 and 1736 an epidemic of diphtheria or scarlet fever struck Boston. Douglass's account of the disease, The Practical History of a New Epidemic Eruptive Miliary Fever, with an Angina Ulcusculosa, Which Prevailed in Boston, New England, in the Years 1735 and 1736, has been called "one of the most valuable essays upon diphtheria up to that time", and "the first adequate description of scarlet fever in English." The Practical History was reprinted in The New England Journal of Medicine in 1825, as "one of the best works extant on the subject." Cadwallader Colden wrote that Douglass had published the "only successful method of cure" for the disease.

== Economics ==
Douglass wrote several pamphlets condemning the use of paper money by the American colonies. His Summary of ... the British Settlements in North America attracted favorable notice from Adam Smith, who cited the work in The Wealth of Nations, and called Douglass "honest and downright." Douglass also wrote about wampum, the Bank of Amsterdam, the ideas of John Law, the South Sea Bubble, taxation, and "political arithmetic."

== Louisbourg ==
The capture of the Fortress of Louisbourg in 1745 by forces from New England caused great excitement and joy in Massachusetts. Douglas had been opposed to the expedition against Louisbourg from the beginning, and continued to criticize it afterwards. Douglass held that the expedition had been poorly planned and inadequately manned for an attack on the powerful fortress at Louisbourg, and had succeeded only by a string of lucky turns of events. Critics have cited Douglass's continued criticism of the Louisbourg expedition as evidence of his stubbornness and failure to acknowledge the errors of his opinions. Bullock, however, notes that historians largely agree with Douglass's assessment of the inadequacy of the preparations for the expedition against Louisbourg, and the role played by luck in it.

== Libel ==
Douglass repeatedly attacked William Shirley, Governor of the Province of Massachusetts Bay, over Shirley's support of paper money in the colony, and over his leadership in the expedition against Louisbourg. In 1747 Royal Navy Captain Charles Knowles, who had served as governor of Louisbourg after its capture, sought to impress American seaman from Boston to bring the ships in his squadron up to strength. The press gangs were heavy-handed, and Boston was still smarting from an incident two years earlier in which two American seamen had been killed in a fight with a Royal Navy press gang. Mobs roamed the streets of Boston, threatening naval officers and ships, and Governor Shirley at his home and at the Boston Town House. Douglass used his pamphlets to attack both Shirley and Knowles over the impressment issue. Both men sued Douglas for libel, but the courts found in favour of Douglass in both cases.

== Scholarly assessment ==
Douglass has been accused of being partial and prejudiced, often in error, careless in writing, and having a "conception of historical method" that was "entirely inadequate." One assessment of Douglass's work was, "Always positive, and sometimes right." On the other hand, Bullock calls Douglass "generally a reliable and valuable authority" on colonial trade, commerce, and money, and states that he gave "intelligent accounts of colonial taxation." Trent and Wells described the Summary of ... the British Settlements in North America as "interesting" and "valuable, in spite of its prejudices and inaccuracies."

== Works ==
- Inoculation of the Small Pox as practised in Boston, considered in a letter to A[lexander] S[tuart], M. D. F. R. S., in London. (1722)
- The Abuses and Scandals of some late Pamphlets in favor of Inoculation of the Small-pox, as practised in Boston. (1722)
- Inoculation, The Abuses and Scandals of some late Pamphlets in favor of Inoculation of the Small-pox, mostly obviated, and Inoculation further considered, considered in a letter to A[lexander] S[tuart], M. D. F. R. S. (1722)
- Postscript to the Above, Being a short answer to the Matters of fact, &c, misrepresented in a late doggerel dialogue (between Academicus and Sawny, &c). (1722)
- Some historical remarks on the city of St. Andrews in North-Britain, with a particular account of the ...Harbour, etc. (1728)
- A Dissertation concerning the Inoculation of the Small-pox. (1730)
- A Practical Essay Concerning the Small-pox. (1730)
- The Practical History of a New Epidemic Eruptive Miliary Fever, with an Angina Ulcusculosa, Which Prevailed in Boston, New England, in the Years 1735 and 1736. (1736)
- Some Observations on the Scheme projected for emitting 60000 £ in Bills of a New Tenour, to be redeemed in Silver and Gold. (1738)
- An Essay, Concerning Silver and Paper Currencies; More Especially with Regard to the British Colonies in New England. (1738)
- A Discourse Concerning the Currencies of the British Plantations in America: More Particularly in Relation to the Province of Massachusetts-Bay, in New England. London: T. Cooper, at the Globe. 1740 – via Internet Archive.
- Mercurius Novanglicanus. (Almanac for 1743–1744) (1743)
- A Summary, Historical and Political, of the First Planting, Progressive Improvements, and Present State of the British Settlements in North America. (1748) (Online at Google Books).
- Plan of the British Dominions of New England. (Map) (1753)

== Bibliography ==
- Bigelow, Jacob. (1880) Memoir. Cambridge, Massachusetts: University Press. Found at Google Books.
- Bullock, Charles J. (1897) "Introduction: Life and Writings of William Douglas". In "A Discourse Concerning the Currencies of the British Plantations in America, &c. by William Douglas. Edited by Charles J. Bullock." Economic studies. (Journal of the American Economic Association) Vol. 2 No. 5. Found at Google Books
- Carr, J. Revell. (2008) Seeds of Discontent: The Deep Roots of the American Revolution: 1650-1750. Walker and Company. ISBN 978-0-8027-1512-8
- C., T. E. Jr. (1981) "William Douglass on the first reported cases of Scarlet Fever in New England, 1736." Pediatrics. Vol. 68 No. 2 August 1981. Abstract found at
- Fireoved, Joseph (Winter 1985). "Nathaniel Gardner and the "New-England Courant"". Early American Literature. 20 (3). University of North Carolina Press: 214–235. JSTOR 25055558.
- Gould, George Milbry and James Hendrie Lloyd. (1900) The Philadelphia medical journal, Volume 5. Philadelphia Medical Publishing Company. Found at Google Books
- Emerson, Wm. A. (1879) History of the Town of Douglas (Massachusetts,) from the earliest period to the close 1878. Frank W. Bird. Found at Google Books
- Harrington, Thomas Francis. (1905) "Chapter V. American Medical Literature of the Eighteenth Century." The Harvard medical school: a history, narrative and documentary. 1782-1905, Volume 1. Lewis Publishing Company. Found at Google Books
- Lemay, J. A. Leo (2006). The life of Benjamin Franklin. University of Pennsylvania Press. ISBN 978-0-8122-38556.
- Trent, William P. and Benjamin W. Wells. (1901) Colonial Prose and Poetry. Thomas Y. Crowell Company. Found at Internet Archive
