= Lydia Lee =

Lydia Lee may refer to the maiden names of"

- Julie Meadows (born 1974), American writer, web designer and former pornographic actress
- Lydia Lee Mather (1670–1734), English-Colonial American wife of Cotton Mather
