= Amateur =

Person who participates in activities on a nonprofessional basis

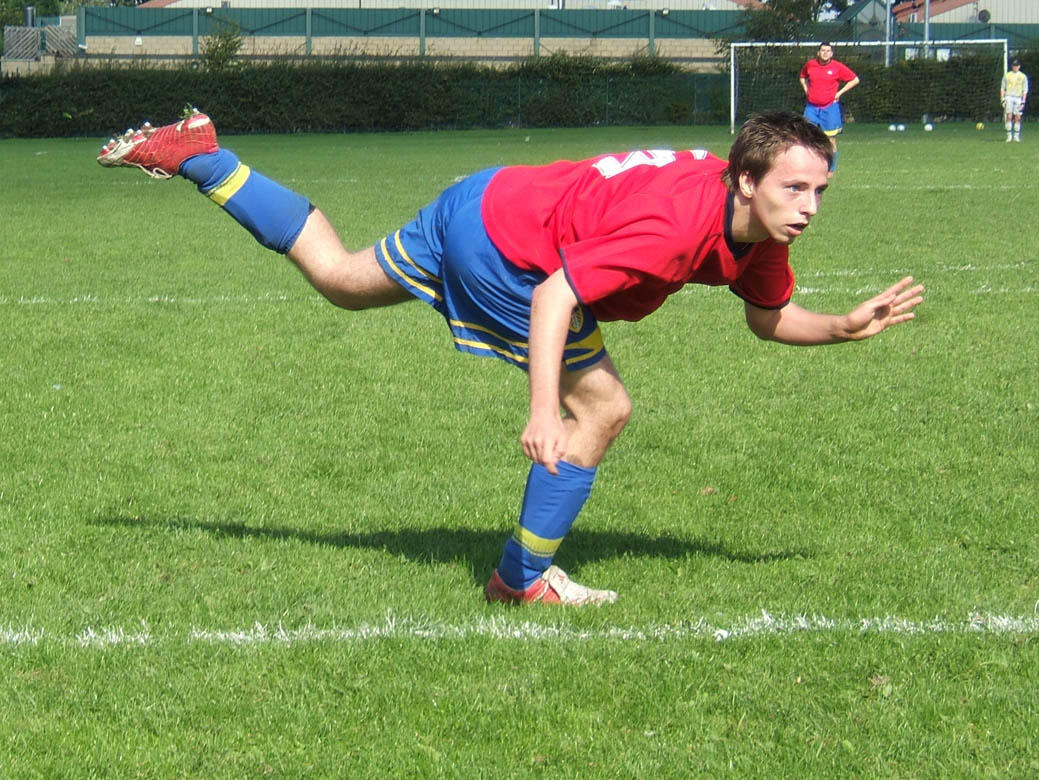
Amateur association football player

An amateur (from French 'one who loves') is generally considered a person who pursues an avocation independent from their source of income. Amateurs and their pursuits are also described as popular, informal, self-taught, user-generated, DIY, and hobbyist.

== History ==
Historically, the amateur was considered to be the ideal balance between pure intent, open mind, and the interest or passion for a subject. That ideology spanned many different fields of interest. It may have its roots in the ancient Greek philosophy of amateur athletes competing in the Olympics. The ancient Greek citizens spent most of their time in other pursuits, but competed according to their natural talents and abilities.

The "gentleman amateur" was a phenomenon among the gentry of Great Britain from the 17th century until the 20th century. With the start of the Age of Reason, with people thinking more about how the world works around them, (see science in the Age of Enlightenment), things like the cabinets of curiosities, and the writing of the book The Christian Virtuoso, started to shape the idea of the gentleman amateur. He was vastly interested in a particular topic, and studied, observed, and collected things and information on his topic of choice. The Royal Society in Great Britain was generally composed of these "gentleman amateurs", and is one of the reasons science today exists the way it does. A few examples of these gentleman amateurs are Francis Bacon, Isaac Newton, and Sir Robert Cotton, 1st Baronet, of Connington.

Amateurism can be seen in both a negative and positive light. Since amateurs often lack formal training and are self-taught, some amateur work may be considered sub-par. For example, amateur athletes in sports such as basketball, baseball, or football are regarded as possessing a lower level of ability than professional athletes. On the other hand, an amateur may be in a position to approach a subject with an open mind (as a result of the lack of formal training) and in a financially disinterested manner. An amateur who dabbles in a field out of interest rather than as a profession, or possesses a general but superficial interest in any art or a branch of knowledge, is often referred to as a dilettante.

== Olympics ==
Through most of the 20th century the Olympics allowed only amateur athletes to participate and this amateur code was strictly enforced, Jim Thorpe was stripped of track and field medals for having taken expense money for playing baseball in 1912.

Later on, the nations of the Communist Bloc entered teams of Olympians who were all nominally students, soldiers, or working in a profession, but many of whom were in reality paid by the state to train on a full-time basis.

Near the end of the 1960s, the Canadian Amateur Hockey Association (CAHA) felt their amateur players could no longer be competitive against the Soviet team's full-time athletes and the other constantly improving European teams. They pushed for the ability to use players from professional leagues but met opposition from the International Ice Hockey Federation (IIHF) and the International Olympic Committee (IOC). At the IIHF Congress in 1969, the IIHF decided to allow Canada to use nine non-NHL professional hockey players at the 1970 World Championships in Montreal and Winnipeg, Manitoba, Canada. The decision was reversed in January 1970 after IOC President Avery Brundage said that ice hockey's status as an Olympic sport would be in jeopardy if the change was made. In response, Canada withdrew from all international ice hockey competitions and officials stated that they would not return until "open competition" was instituted. Günther Sabetzki became president of the IIHF in 1975 and helped to resolve the dispute with the CAHA. In 1976, the IIHF agreed to allow "open competition" between all players in the World Championships. However, NHL players were still not allowed to play in the Olympics, because of the unwillingness of the NHL to take a break mid-season and the IOC's amateur-only policy.

Before the 1984 Winter Olympics, a dispute formed over what made a player a professional. The IOC had adopted a rule that made any player who had signed an NHL contract but played less than ten games in the league eligible. However, the United States Olympic Committee maintained that any player contracted with an NHL team was a professional and therefore not eligible to play. The IOC held an emergency meeting that ruled NHL-contracted players were eligible, as long as they had not played in any NHL games. This made five players on Olympic rosters—one Austrian, two Italians and two Canadians—ineligible. Players who had played in other professional leagues—such as the World Hockey Association—were allowed to play. Canadian hockey official Alan Eagleson stated that the rule was only applied to the NHL and that professionally contracted players in European leagues were still considered amateurs. Murray Costello of the CAHA suggested that a Canadian withdrawal was possible. In 1986, the IOC voted to allow all athletes to compete in Olympic Games starting in 1988, but let the individual sport federations decide if they wanted to allow professionals.

After the 1972 retirement of IOC President Brundage, the Olympic amateurism rules were steadily relaxed, amounting only to technicalities and lip service, until being completely abandoned in the 1990s (in the United States, the Amateur Sports Act of 1978 prohibits national governing bodies from having more stringent standards of amateur status than required by international governing bodies of respective sports. The act caused the breakup of the Amateur Athletic Union as a wholesale sports governing body at the Olympic level).

Olympic regulations regarding amateur status of athletes were eventually abandoned in the 1990s with the exception of wrestling, where the amateur fight rules are used because professional wrestling is largely staged with predetermined outcomes. Starting from the 2016 Summer Olympics, professionals were allowed to compete in boxing, though amateur fight rules are still used for the tournament.

== Contribution of amateurs ==
Many amateurs make valuable contributions in the field of computer programming through the open source movement. Amateur dramatics is the performance of plays or musical theater, often to high standards, but lacking the budgets of professional West End or Broadway performances. Astronomy, chemistry, history, linguistics, and the natural sciences are among the fields that have benefited from the activities of amateurs. Gregor Mendel was an amateur scientist who never held a position in his field of study. Radio astronomy was founded by Grote Reber, an amateur radio operator. Radio itself was greatly advanced by Guglielmo Marconi, a young Italian man who started out by tinkering with a coherer and a spark coil as an amateur electrician. Pierre de Fermat was a highly influential mathematician whose primary vocation was law.

In the 2000s and 2010s, the distinction between amateur and professional has become increasingly blurred, especially in areas such as computer programming, music and astronomy. The term amateur professionalism, or pro-am, is used to describe these activities.

== List of amateur pursuits ==
- Amateur astronomy, including a list of notable amateur astronomers
- Amateur rocketry, including a list of notable achievements
- Amateur chemistry, including a list of notable amateur chemists
- Amateur film
- Amateur geology or rockhounding, including a list of notable amateur geologists
- Amateur journalism
- Amateur radio
- Amateur sports
- Amateur theatre
- Amateur pornography
- Arts and crafts or handicraft, including a list of handicrafts carried out by amateurs
- Fan fiction
- Fan art
- Independent scholar
- Independent scientist or gentleman scientist, including a list of notable amateur scientists

== See also ==
- Professional
- Semi-professional
- Amateurism in the NCAA
- Amateur professionalism
- Hobby
- List of amateur chess players
- List of amateur mathematicians
- List of amateur wrestlers
- Volunteering
