= Samuel Lee (English minister) =

English Puritan academic and minister

Samuel Lee (1625–1691) was an English Puritan academic and minister, late in life in New England.

== Early life ==
He was the only son of Samuel Lee, haberdasher of small wares in Fish Street Hill, London. He was educated at St. Paul's School, London under Alexander Gill.

== Academic and minister ==
Lee entered Magdalen Hall, Oxford, in 1647, and was created M.A. by the parliamentary visitors on 14 April 1648. He was elected fellow of Wadham College on 3 October 1648, was recommended for a fellowship at Merton in 1649, and was appointed to one at All Souls in 1650, but nevertheless remained at Wadham. He was elected proctor for 1651, objection on the ground of insufficient standing being overruled by the parliamentary visitors, and he was admitted 9 April 1651. He was bursar of his college in 1648, 1650, and 1664, sub-warden in 1652, and dean in 1653. From about 1650 he was a preacher in and near Oxford, although he had not received orders from a bishop. After preaching in London he was, in 1654, recalled to his duties at Wadham by the visitors of that year. He gave up his rooms on 13 June 1656, and vacated his fellowship in 1657.

In July 1655 Lee was made minister of St. Botolph's, Bishopsgate, by Oliver Cromwell. He occupied the church till August 1659, when he was removed by a committee of the Rump parliament. Towards the end of the Protectorate he was also lecturer of St. Helen's, Bishopsgate.

== After 1660 ==
After the Restoration Lee became a member of John Owen's congregation in Leadenhall Street, though John Wilkins, his former tutor, vainly urged him to conform. He preached in London churches, and sometimes resided on an estate he possessed at Bignal, near Bicester in Oxfordshire. On the death of John Rowe (12 October 1677) he became joint pastor with Theophilus Gale of Howe's congregation in Baker's Court, Holborn. The following year, on Gale's death, he removed to Newington Green, where he was minister of an independent congregation till 1686.

== Last years ==
Lee migrated to New England in 1686, and on the formation of a church at Bristol, Rhode Island was chosen minister on 8 May 1687. After the Glorious Revolution he decided to return to England. He sailed from Boston 2 October 1691. His ship was seized by a French privateer and taken to St. Malo. His wife and daughter were separated from him and, unknown to him, were sent to England. He died at St. Malo of a fever about Christmas 1691, and was buried outside the town. Lee inclined more to independency than to presbyterianism, but was not rigid.

Lee rejected a call from the First Church and Parish in Dedham to settle with them in 1687.

== Works ==
Lee was a noted scholar, and studied astrology, but then destroyed the books and manuscripts that he had collected. on the subject. He continued the Theatrum Historicum of Helvicus from 1629 (Oxford edition, 1651). For the sixth edition (Oxford, 1662) he further supplied a treatise De Antiquitate Academiæ Oxoniensis, and Tractatulus ad Periodum Julianum spectans, both in the name of the printer H. Hall, and continued the work to that year. His Chronicum Cestrenæ was published in Daniel King's Vale Royal of England, London, 1656.

Other works by Lee were:

- Orbis Miraculum, or the Temple of Solomon, London, 1659, 1665, printed at the expense of the university of Oxford. This book was plagiarised by Christopher Kelly, who reproduced the last part as Solomon's Temple spiritualized at Dublin in 1803. It was again published as Kelly's in 1820, at Philadelphia.
- De Excidio Anti-christi, 1659.
- What means may be used towards the Conversion of our Carnal Relations? London, 1661; in Samuel Annesley's Morning Exercises, 1677 and 1844.
- Contemplations on Mortality, London, 1669.
- The Visibility of the True Church, in Nathanael Vincent's Morning Exercises, 1675; Annesley, 1845.
- How to manage Secret Prayer, in Annesley's Supplement, 1676 and 1844.
- The Triumph of Mercy, London, 1677; Boston, 1718.
- Ecclesia Gemens (anon.), London, 1677, 1678, 1679.
- Israel Redux, London, 1677, 1678, 1679, including a hitherto unpublished essay on the Ten Tribes by Giles Fletcher.
- The Joy of Faith, Boston, 1687; London, 1689.

After Lee's death appeared The Great Day of Judgment, an assize sermon, Boston, 1692, 1694, 1696. He published a collection of thirty sermons by John Rowe, under the title of Emmanuel, or the Love of Christ, London, 1680. Lee has been identified as the "S. L." who wrote the preface to Thomas Mall's History of the Martyrs epitomised.

== Family ==
In his will Lee left property to his wife Martha, and books and manuscripts to his four daughters, Rebecca, Anna, Lydia, and Elizabeth. His daughter Lydia married John George, a merchant of Boston, and after George's death became, on 5 July 1716, the third wife of Cotton Mather. She died on 22 January 1734.

== Notes ==
Attribution

This article incorporates text from a publication now in the public domain: Lee, Sidney, ed. (1892). "Lee, Samuel (1625-1691)". Dictionary of National Biography. Vol. 32. London: Smith, Elder & Co.
