= Jane Minor =

African-American healer and slave emancipator (c.1792–1858)

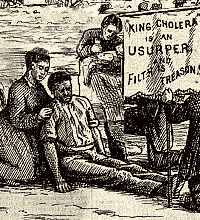
Early poster of a cholera epidemic. Jane Minor was emancipated because of her healing work during an 1825 epidemic in Virginia

Jane Minor (c. 1792 – 1858), also known as Gensey (or Jensey) Snow, was an African-American healer and slave emancipator, one of the few documented enslaved healing practitioners in United States history.

== Early life ==
Minor was born into slavery as Gensey Snow in Dinwiddie County, Virginia. She worked on the estate of Benjamin Harris May.

== Healer and emancipator ==
Minor "was apparently skilled medically and a very gifted, nurturing healer, someone patients really responded to," according to historian Susan Lebsock. In 1825, a fever epidemic struck Petersburg, Virginia, and many families, black and white, were affected. As a result of her healing work, Benjamin May gave Minor her freedom. In the manumission deed, he notes that he freed Minor "for several acts of extraordinary merit in nursing at the imminent risk of her own health and safety, exercising the most unexampled patience and attention in watching over the sick beds of several individuals of this town, as well as on account of my belief that she will in the future continue ... to perform similar acts ... "

In 1826, she met and married Lewis Minor, a free laborer. After her emancipation, she took the name Jane Minor. The money Jane Minor earned as a medical practitioner, usually from $2-$5 per visit, allowed her to purchase and free at least sixteen slaves, some of whom cost over $2,000. In one case, in July, 1840, she bought and freed a mulatto woman named Emily Smith and her five children. In another, the same month and year, she emancipated a fellow healing practitioner named Phoebe Jackson. Lebsock says Minor was the most active free black emancipator in Petersburg, male or female.

More than 30 years after her manumission, Petersburg newspapers printed reports of operations performed by physicians in "the Hospital of the well-known nurse Jinsey Snow." Cupping and leeching were standard medical practices of that time. Researchers have observed that enslaved medical practitioners like Jane Minor often brought herbal and other medical knowledge from Africa that was at that time unknown in early colonial America.

== See also ==
- Onesimus (Bostonian) (the 1600s – 1700s), an enslaved African man in Boston who advocated smallpox inoculation
