= Cotton Mather =

Puritan clergyman (1663–1728)

The Reverend Cotton Mather FRS
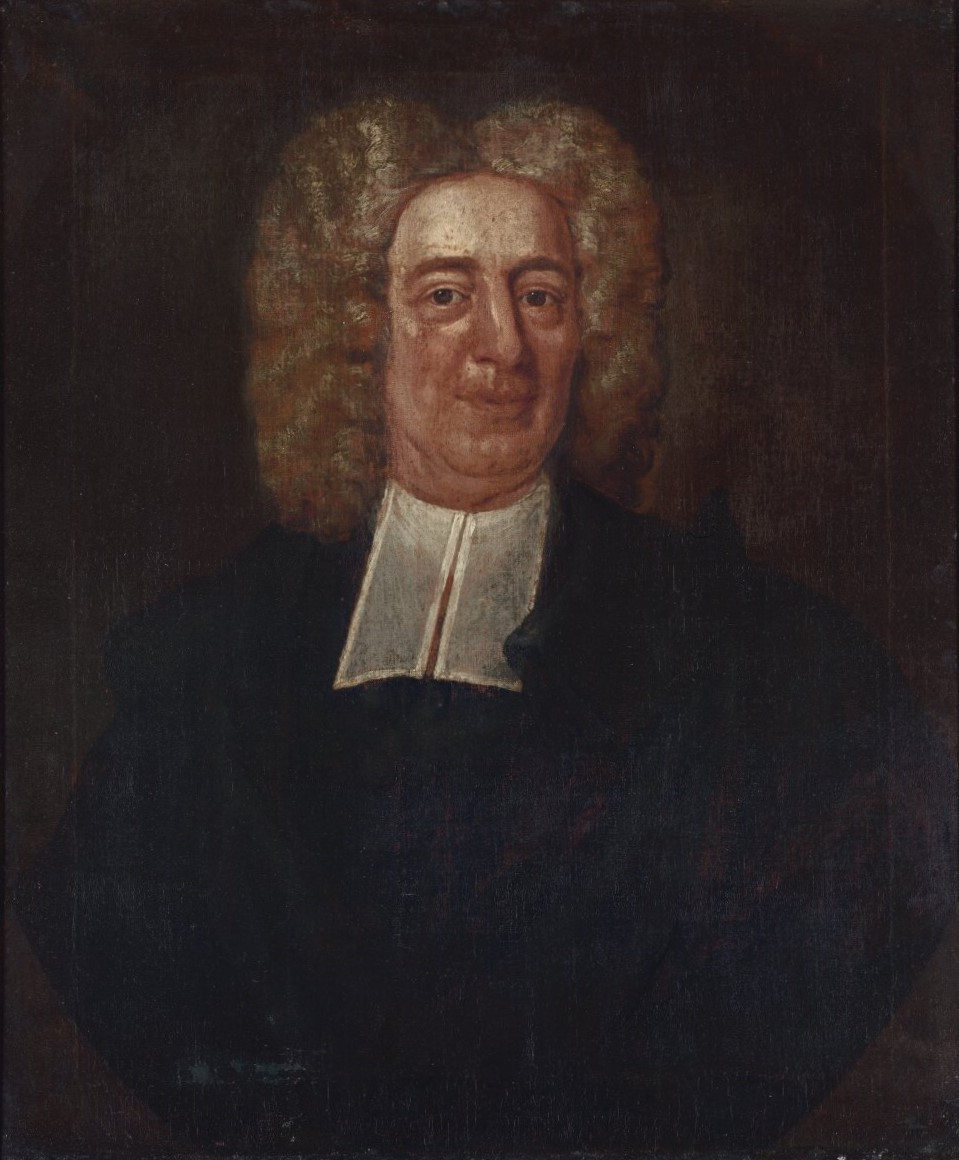
- Portrait by Peter Pelham, 1727
- Born: February 12, 1663; Boston, Massachusetts Bay Colony, British America
- Died: February 15, 1728 (aged 65); Boston, Province of Massachusetts Bay, British America
- Resting place: Copp's Hill Burying Ground, Boston
- Education: Harvard College (AB, 1678; MA, 1681)
- Occupations: Minister; writer
- Parents: Increase Mather; Maria Cotton
- Relatives: John Cotton (maternal grandfather); Richard Mather (paternal grandfather); Albert D. Mather (descendant)

Cotton Mather (/ˈmæðər/; February 12, 1663 – February 15, 1728) was a Puritan polymath who was a theologian, scientist, medical writer and chronicler active in British America. After being educated at Harvard College, he joined his father Increase Mather as minister of the Congregationalist Old North Meeting House in Boston, then part of the Massachusetts Bay Colony, where he preached for the rest of his life and was active in local politics. Mather was a prolific author concerning subjects such as witchcraft, medicine, religion and contemporary events.

Cotton Mather was one of the leaders of the successful revolt of 1689 against Sir Edmund Andros, the governor of New England appointed by King James II. Mather's subsequent involvement in the Salem witch trials of 1692–1693, which he defended in the book Wonders of the Invisible World (1693), attracted intense controversy in his own day and has negatively affected his historical reputation. As a historian of colonial New England, Mather is noted for his Magnalia Christi Americana (1702). A modern biographer has identified Mather as the "first American Evangelical".

Personally and intellectually committed to the waning social and religious orders in New England, Cotton Mather unsuccessfully sought the presidency of Harvard College, which had previously been occupied by his father Increase. After 1702, he clashed with Joseph Dudley, the governor of the Province of Massachusetts Bay. Mather championed the new Yale College as an intellectual bulwark of Puritanism in colonial New England. He corresponded extensively with European intellectuals and received an honorary Doctor of Divinity degree from the University of Glasgow in 1710.

A promoter of the new experimental science, Cotton Mather carried out original research on plant hybridization. He also promoted the variolation method of inoculation as a means of preventing smallpox contagion, which he had learned about from an African-American slave whom he owned, Onesimus. He dispatched multiple reports on scientific matters to the Royal Society of London, which elected him as a fellow in 1713. Mather's promotion of inoculation against smallpox caused violent controversy in Boston during the outbreak of 1721. Scientist and United States Founding Father Benjamin Franklin, who as a young Bostonian had opposed the old Puritan order represented by Mather and participated in the anti-inoculation campaign, later described Mather's book Bonifacius, or Essays to Do Good (1710) as a major influence on his life.

== Early life and education ==
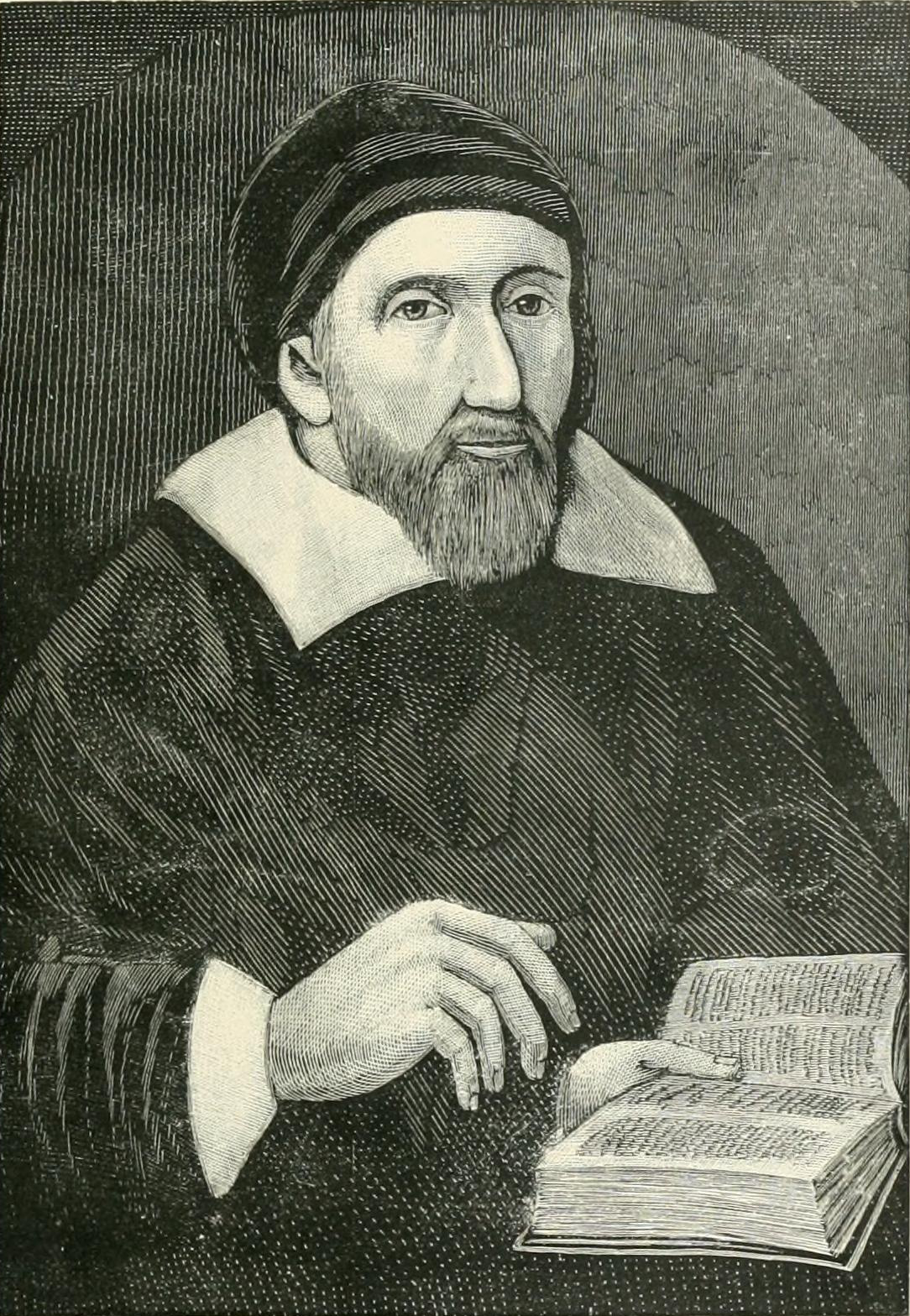
Richard Mather

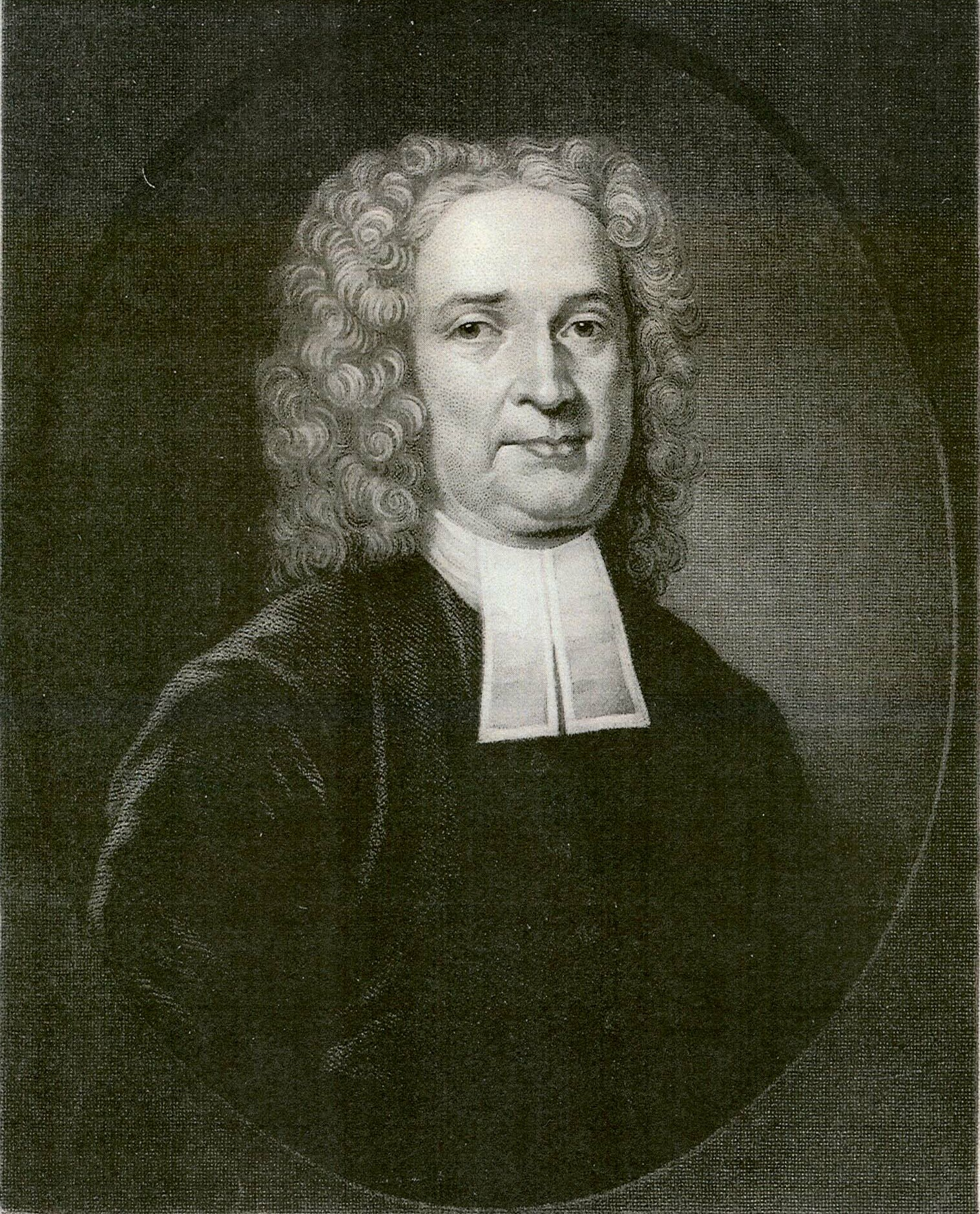
John Cotton (1585–1652)

Cotton Mather was born in 1663 in the city of Boston, the capital of the Massachusetts Bay Colony, to the Rev. Increase Mather and his wife Maria Cotton. His grandfathers were Richard Mather and John Cotton, both of them prominent Puritan ministers who had played major roles in the establishment and growth of the Massachusetts colony. Richard Mather was a graduate of the University of Oxford and John Cotton a graduate of the University of Cambridge. Increase Mather was a graduate of Harvard College and the Trinity College Dublin, and served as the minister of Boston's original North Church (not to be confused with the Anglican Old North Church of Paul Revere fame). This was one of the two principal Congregationalist churches in the city, the other being the First Church established by John Winthrop. Cotton Mather was therefore born into one of the most influential and intellectually distinguished families in colonial New England and seemed destined to follow his father and grandfathers into the Puritan clergy.

Cotton entered Harvard College, in the neighboring town of Cambridge, in 1674. Aged only eleven and a half, he is the youngest student ever admitted to that institution. At around this time, Cotton began to be afflicted by stuttering, a speech disorder that he would struggle to overcome throughout the rest of his life. Bullied by the older students and fearing that his stutter would make him unsuitable as a preacher, Cotton withdrew temporarily from the college, continuing his education at home. He also took an interest in medicine and considered the possibility of pursuing a career as a physician rather than as a religious minister. Cotton eventually returned to Harvard and received his Bachelor of Arts degree in 1678, followed by a Master of Arts degree in 1681, the same year his father became Harvard President. At Harvard, Cotton studied Hebrew and the sciences.

After completing his education, Cotton joined his father's church as assistant pastor. In 1685, Cotton was ordained and assumed full responsibilities as co-pastor of the church. Father and son continued to share responsibility for the care of the congregation until the death of Increase in 1723. Cotton would die less than five years after his father, and was therefore throughout most of his career in the shadow of the respected and formidable Increase.

When Increase Mather became president of Harvard in 1692, he exercised considerable influence on the politics of the Massachusetts colony. Despite Cotton's efforts, he never became quite as influential as his father. One of the most public displays of their strained relationship emerged during the Salem witch trials, which Increase Mather reportedly did not support. Cotton did surpass his father's output as a writer, producing nearly 400 works.

== Personal life ==
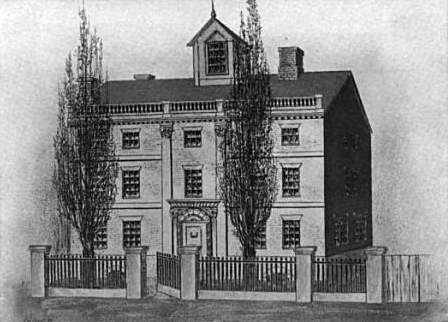
Mather lived on Hanover Street, Boston, 1688–1718

Cotton Mather married Abigail Phillips, daughter of Colonel John Phillips of Charlestown, on May 4, 1686, when Cotton was twenty-three and Abigail was fifteen years old. They had eight children.

Abigail died of smallpox in 1702, having previously suffered a miscarriage. He married widow Elizabeth Hubbard in 1703. Like his first marriage, he was happily married to a very religious and emotionally stable woman. They had six children. Elizabeth, the couple's newborn twins, and a two-year-old daughter, Jerusha, all succumbed to a measles epidemic in 1713.

On July 5, 1715, Mather married widow Lydia Lee George. Her daughter Katherine, wife of Nathan Howell, became a widow shortly after Lydia married Mather and she came to live with the newly married couple. Also living in the Mather household at that time were Mather's children Abigal (21), Hannah (18), Elizabeth (11), and Samuel (9). Initially, Mather wrote in his journal how lovely he found his wife and how much he enjoyed their discussions about scripture. Within a few years of their marriage, Lydia was subject to rages which left Mather humiliated and depressed. They clashed over Mather's piety and his mishandling of Nathan Howell's estate. He began to call her deranged. She left him for ten days, returning when she learned that Mather's son Increase was lost at sea. Lydia nursed him through illnesses, the last of which lasted five weeks and ended with his death on February 15, 1728. Of the children that Mather had with Abigail and Elizabeth, the only children to survive him were Hannah and Samuel. He did not have any children with Lydia.

== Revolt of 1689 ==
On May 14, 1686, ten days after Cotton Mather's marriage to Abigail Phillips, Edward Randolph disembarked in Boston bearing letters patent from King James II of England that revoked the Charter of the Massachusetts Bay Company and commissioned Randolph to reorganize the colonial government. James's intention was to curb Massachusetts's religious separatism by incorporating the colony into a larger Dominion of New England, without an elected legislature and under a governor who would serve at the pleasure of the Crown. Later that year, the King appointed Sir Edmund Andros as governor of that new Dominion. This was a direct attack upon the Puritan religious and social orders that the Mathers represented, as well as upon the local autonomy of Massachusetts. The colonists were particularly outraged when Andros declared that all grants of land made in the name of the old Massachusetts Bay Company were invalid, forcing them to apply and pay for new royal patents on land that they already occupied or face eviction. In April 1687, Increase Mather sailed to London, where he remained for the next four years, pleading with the Court for what he regarded as the interests of the Massachusetts colony.

The birth of a male heir to King James in June 1688, which could have cemented a Roman Catholic dynasty in the English throne, triggered the so-called Glorious Revolution in which Parliament deposed James and gave the Crown jointly to his Protestant daughter Mary and her husband, the Dutch Prince William of Orange. News of the events in London greatly emboldened the opposition in Boston to Governor Andros, finally precipitating the 1689 Boston revolt. Cotton Mather, then aged twenty-six, was one of the Puritan ministers who guided resistance in Boston to Andros's regime. Early in 1689, Randolph had a warrant issued for Cotton Mather's arrest on a charge of "scandalous libel", but the warrant was overruled by Wait Winthrop.

According to some sources, Cotton Mather escaped a second attempted arrest on April 18, 1689, the same day that the people of Boston took up arms against Andros. The young Mather may have authored, in whole or in part, the "Declaration of the Gentlemen, Merchants, and Inhabitants of Boston and the Country Adjacent", which justified that uprising by a list of grievances that the declaration attributed to the deposed officials. The authorship of that document is uncertain: it was not signed by Mather or any other clergymen, and Puritans frowned upon the clergy being seen to play too direct and personal a hand in political affairs. That day, Mather probably read the Declaration to a crowd gathered in front of the Boston Town House.

In July, Andros, Randolph, Joseph Dudley, and other officials who had been deposed and arrested in the Boston revolt were summoned to London to answer the complaints against them. The administration of Massachusetts was temporarily assumed by Simon Bradstreet, whose rule proved weak and contentious. In 1691, the government of King William and Queen Mary issued a new Massachusetts Charter. This charter united the Massachusetts Bay Colony with Plymouth Colony into the new Province of Massachusetts Bay. Rather than restoring the old Puritan rule, the Charter of 1691 mandated religious toleration for all non-Catholics and established a government led by a Crown-appointed governor. The first governor under the new charter was Sir William Phips, who was a member of the Mathers' church in Boston.

== Involvement with the Salem witch trials ==
Cotton Mather's reputation, in his own day as well as in the historiography and popular culture of subsequent generations, has been adversely affected by his association with the events surrounding the Salem witch trials of 1692–1693. As a consequence of those trials, nineteen people were executed by hanging for practicing witchcraft and one was pressed to death for refusing to enter a plea before the court. Although Mather had no official role in the legal proceedings, he wrote the book Wonders of the Invisible World, which appeared in 1693 with the endorsement of William Stoughton, the Lieutenant Governor of Massachusetts and chief judge of the Salem witch trials. Mather's book constitutes the most detailed written defense of the conduct of those trials. Mather's role in drumming up and sustaining the witch hysteria behind those proceedings was denounced by Robert Calef in his book More Wonders of the Invisible World, published in 1700. In the 19th century, Nathaniel Hawthorne called Mather "the chief agent of the mischief" at Salem.

More recently historians have tended to downplay Mather's role in the events at Salem. According to Jan Stievermann, of the Heidelberg Center for American Studies,

unlike some other ministers [Cotton Mather] never called for an end to the trials, and he afterwards wrote New England's official defense of the court's proceedings, the infamous Wonders of the Invisible World (1693). Still, there is now a general agreement that his beliefs were very typical of the period, that he acted as a moderating force in the context of the trials, and that he never directly participated in the proceedings. He advised the judges against using spectral evidence and offered recommendations to proceed with caution lest innocent people come to harm. In the end, Mather's role in the witchcraft episode was thus ambivalent and conflicted.

=== Prelude: The Goodwin case ===
In 1689, Mather published Memorable Providences, Relating to Witchcrafts and Possessions, based on his study of events surrounding the affliction of the children of a Boston mason named John Goodwin. Those afflictions had begun after Goodwin's eldest daughter confronted a washerwoman whom she suspected of stealing some of the family's linen. In response to this, the washerwoman's mother, Ann Glover, verbally insulted the Goodwin girl, who soon began to suffer from hysterical fits that later began to afflict also the three other Goodwin children. Glover was an Irish Catholic widow who could understand English but spoke only Gaelic. Interrogated by the magistrates, she admitted that she tormented her enemies by stroking certain images or dolls with her finger wetted with spittle. After she was sentenced to death for witchcraft, Mather visited her in prison and interrogated her through an interpreter.

Before her execution, Glover warned that her death would not bring relief to the Goodwin children, as she was not the one responsible for their torments. Indeed, after Glover was hanged the children's afflictions increased. Mather documented these events and attempted to de-possess the "Haunted Children" by prayer and fasting. He also took in the eldest Goodwin child, Martha, into his own home, where she lived for several weeks. Eventually, the afflictions ceased and Martha was admitted into Mather's church.

The publication of Mather's Memorable Providences attracted attention on both sides of the Atlantic, including from the eminent English Puritan Richard Baxter. In his book, Mather argued that since there are witches and devils, there are "immortal souls". He also claimed that witches appear spectrally as themselves. He opposed any natural explanations for the fits, believed that people who confessed to using witchcraft were sane, and warned against all magical practices due to their diabolical connections.

Mather's contemporary Robert Calef would later accuse Mather of laying the groundwork, with his Memorable Providences, for the witchcraft hysteria that gripped Salem three years later:

Mr Cotton Mather, was the most active and forward of any Minister in the Country in those matters, taking home one of the Children, and managing such Intreagues with that Child, and after printing such an account of the whole, in his Memorable Providences, as conduced much to the kindling of those Flames, that in Sir William's time threatened the devouring of this Country.

Similar views, on Mather's responsibility for the climate of hysteria over witchcraft that led to the Salem trials, were repeated by later commentators, such as the politician and historian Charles W. Upham in the 19th century.

=== Preparation for the Salem trials ===
When the accusations of witchcraft arose in Salem Village in 1692, Cotton Mather was incapacitated by a serious illness, which he attributed to overwork. He suggested that the afflicted girls be separated and offered to take six of them into his home, as he had done previously with Martha Goodwin. That offer was not accepted.

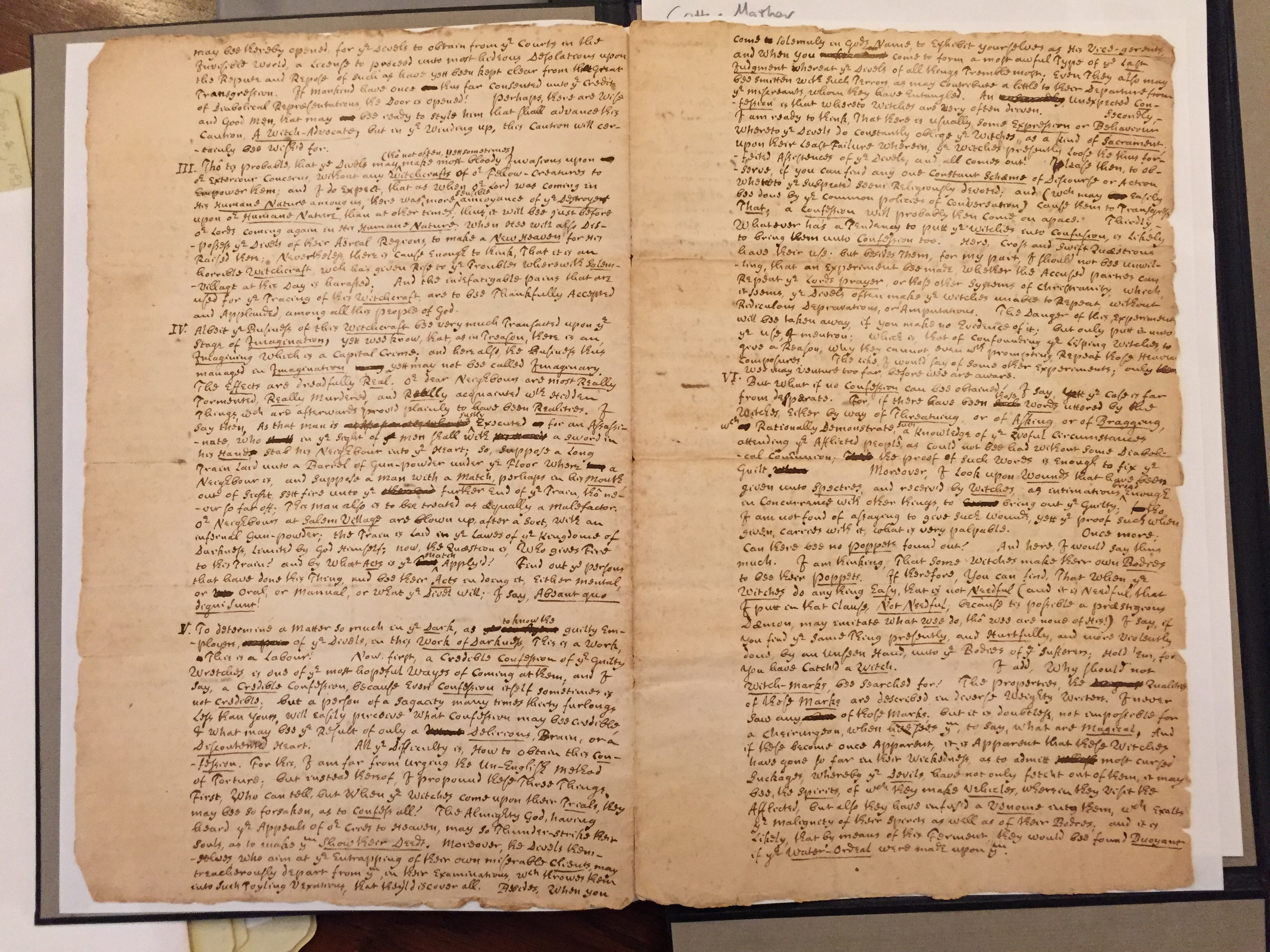
Holograph copy of Cotton Mather's letter of advice to John Richards concerning the impending trials at Salem, May 31, 1692

In May of that year, Sir William Phips, governor of the newly chartered Province of Massachusetts Bay, appointed a special "Court of Oyer and Terminer" to try the cases of witchcraft in Salem. The chief judge of that court was Phips's lieutenant governor, William Stoughton. Stoughton had close ties to the Mathers and had been recommended as Governor Phips's lieutenant by Increase Mather.

Another of the judges in the new court, John Richards, requested that Cotton Mather accompany him to Salem, but Mather refused due to his ill health. Instead, Mather wrote a long letter to Richards in which he gave his advice on the impending trials. In that letter, Mather states that witches guilty of the most grievous crimes should be executed, but that witches convicted of lesser offenses deserve more lenient punishment. He also wrote that the identification and conviction of all witches should be undertaken with the greatest caution and warned against the use of spectral evidence (i.e., testimony that the specter of the accused had tormented a victim) on the grounds that devils could assume the form of innocent and even virtuous people. Under English law, spectral evidence had been admissible in witchcraft trials for a century before the events in Salem, and it would remain admissible until 1712. There was, however, debate among experts as to how much weight should be given to such testimonies.

=== Response to the trials ===
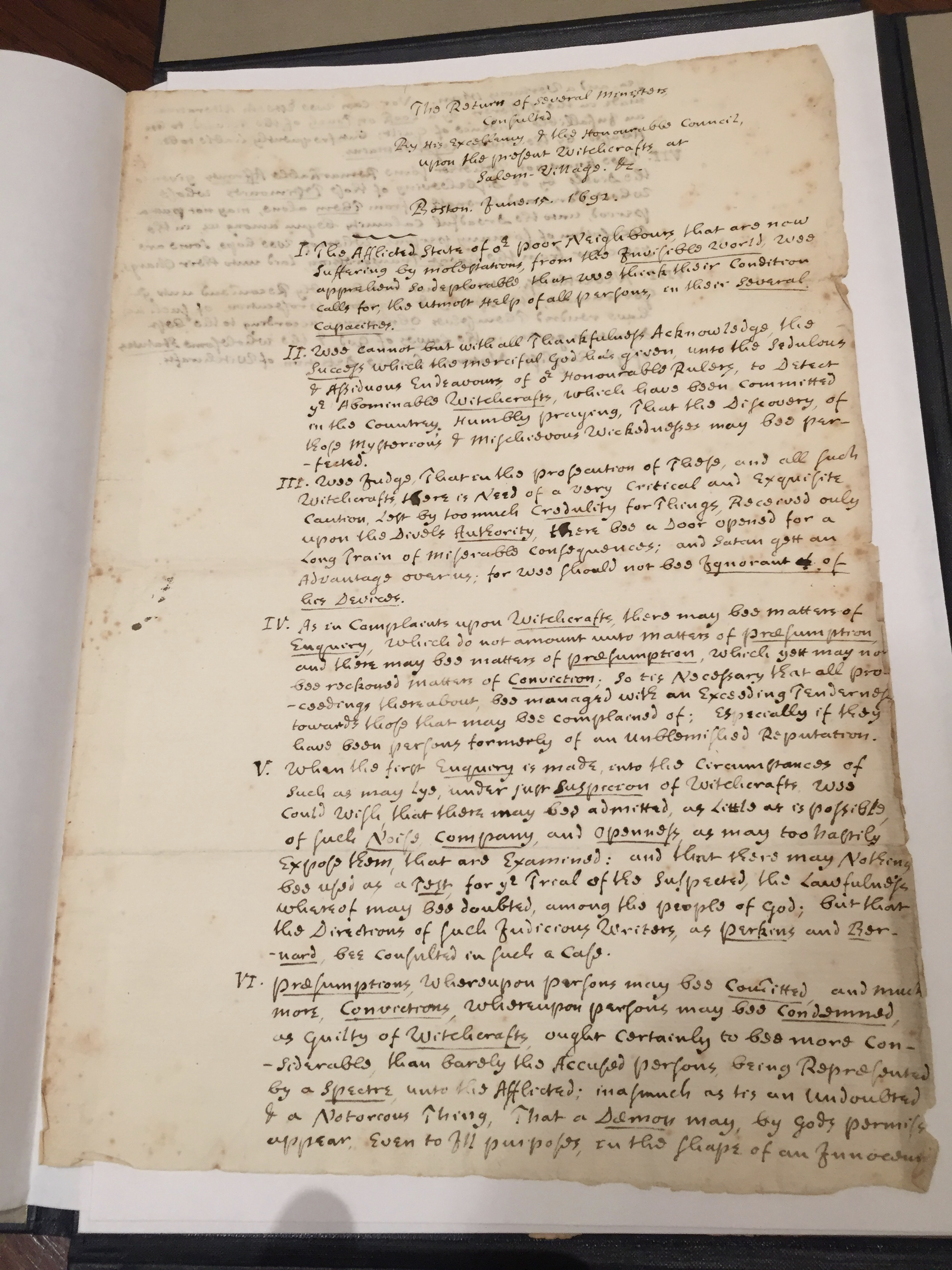
The Return of Several Ministers, written in Cotton Mather's hand

On June 10, 1692, Bridget Bishop, the thrice-married owner of an unlicensed tavern, was hanged after being convicted and sentenced by the Court of Oyer and Terminer, based largely on spectral evidence. A group of twelve Puritan ministers issued a statement, drawn up by Cotton Mather and presented to Governor Phips and his council a few days later, entitled The Return of Several Ministers. In that document, Mather criticized the court's reliance on spectral evidence and recommended that it adopt a more cautious procedure. However, he ended the document with a statement defending the continued prosecution of witchcraft according to the "Direction given by the Laws of God, and the wholesome Statues of the English Nation". Robert Calef would later criticize Mather's intervention in The Return of Several Ministers as "perfectly ambidexter, giving a great or greater encouragement to proceed in those dark methods, than cautions against them".

On August 4, Cotton Mather preached a sermon before his North Church congregation on the text of Revelation 12:12: "Woe to the Inhabitants of the Earth, and of the Sea; for the Devil is come down unto you, having great Wrath; because he knoweth, that he hath but a short time." In the sermon, Mather claimed that the witches "have associated themselves to do no less a thing than to destroy the Kingdom of our Lord Jesus Christ, in these parts of the World". Although he did not intervene in any of the trials, there are some testimonies that Mather was present at the executions that were carried out in Salem on August 19. According to Mather's contemporary critic Robert Calef, the crowd was disturbed by George Burroughs's eloquent declarations of innocence from the scaffold and by his recitation of the Lord's Prayer, of which witches were commonly believed to be incapable. Calef claimed that, after Burroughs had been hanged,

Mr. Cotton Mather, being mounted upon a Horse, addressed himself to the People, partly to declare that [Burroughs] was no ordained Minister, partly to possess the People of his guilt, saying that the devil often had been transformed into the Angel of Light. And this did somewhat appease the People, and the Executions went on.

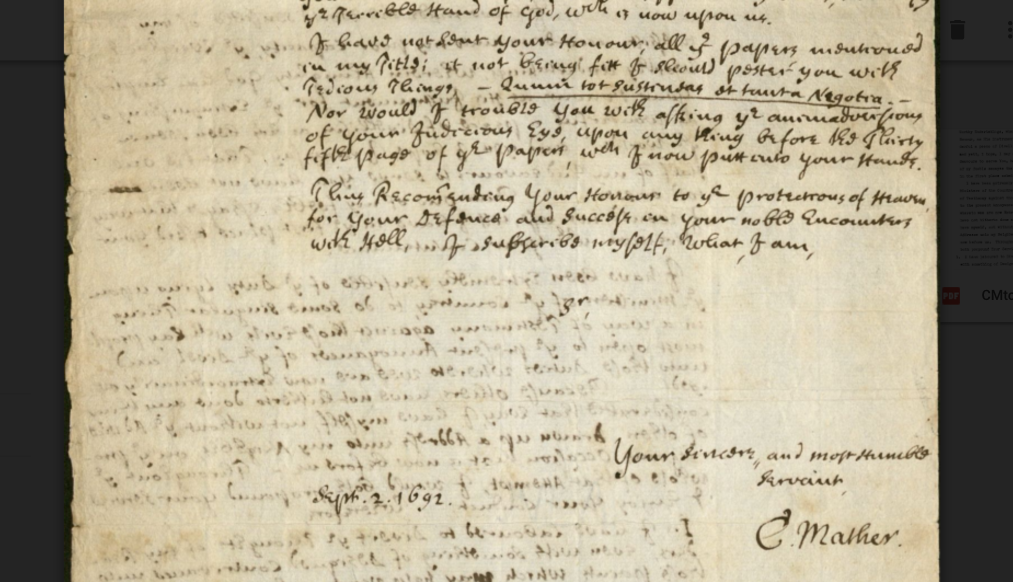
Letter from Cotton Mather to Judge William Stoughton, September 2, 1692

As public discontent with the witch trials grew in the summer of 1692, threatening civil unrest, Cotton Mather felt compelled to defend the responsible authorities. On September 2, 1692, after eleven people had been executed as witches, Cotton Mather wrote a letter to Judge Stoughton congratulating him on "extinguishing of as wonderful a piece of devilism as has been seen in the world". As the opposition to the witch trials was bringing them to a halt, Mather wrote Wonders of the Invisible World, a defense of the trials that carried Stoughton's official approval.

=== Post-trials ===
Mather's Wonders did little to appease the growing clamor against the Salem witch trials. At around the same time that the book began to circulate in manuscript form, Governor Phips decided to restrict greatly the use of spectral evidence, thus raising a high barrier against further convictions. The Court of Oyer and Terminer was dismissed on October 29. A new court convened in January 1693 to hear the remaining cases, almost all of which ended in acquittal. In May, Governor Phips issued a general pardon, bringing the witch trials to an end.

The last major events in Mather's involvement with witchcraft were his interactions with Mercy Short in December 1692 and Margaret Rule in September 1693. Mather appears to have remained convinced that genuine witches had been executed in Salem and he never publicly expressed regrets over his role in those events. Robert Calef, an otherwise obscure Boston merchant, published More Wonders of the Invisible World in 1700, bitterly attacking Cotton Mather over his role in the events of 1692. In the words of 20th-century historian Samuel Eliot Morison, "Robert Calef tied a tin can to Cotton Mather which has rattled and banged through the pages of superficial and popular historians". Intellectual historian Reiner Smolinski, an expert on the writings of Cotton Mather, found it "deplorable that Mather's reputation is still overshadowed by the specter of Salem witchcraft".

== Historical and theological writings ==
Cotton Mather was an extremely prolific writer, producing 388 different books and pamphlets during his lifetime. His most widely distributed work was Magnalia Christi Americana (which may be translated as "The Glorious Works of Christ in America"), subtitled "The ecclesiastical history of New England, from its first planting in the year 1620 unto the year of Our Lord 1698. In seven books." Despite the Latin title, the work is written in English. Mather began working on it towards the end of 1693 and it was finally published in London in 1702. The work incorporates information that Mather put together from a variety of sources, such as letters, diaries, sermons, Harvard College records, personal conversations, and the manuscript histories composed by William Hubbard and William Bradford. The Magnalia includes about fifty biographies of eminent New Englanders (ranging from John Eliot, the first Puritan missionary to the Native Americans, to Sir William Phips, the incumbent governor of Massachusetts at the time that Mather began writing), plus dozens of brief biographical sketches, including those of Hannah Duston and Hannah Swarton.

According to Kenneth Silverman, an expert on early American literature and Cotton Mather's biographer,

If the epic ambitions of Magnalia, its attempt to put American on the cultural map, recall such later American works as Moby-Dick (to which it has been compared), its effort to rejoin provincial America to the mainstream of English culture recalls rather The Waste Land. Genuinely Anglo-American in outlook, the book projects a New England which is ultimately an enlarged version of Cotton Mather himself, a pious citizen of "The Metropolis of the whole English America".

Silverman argues that, although Mather glorifies New England's Puritan past, in the Magnalia he also attempts to transcend the religious separatism of the old Puritan settlers, reflecting Mather's more ecumenical and cosmopolitan embrace of a Transatlantic Protestant Christianity that included, in addition to Mather's own Congregationalists, also Presbyterians, Baptists, and low church Anglicans.

In 1693 Mather also began work on a grand intellectual project that he titled Biblia Americana, which sought to provide a commentary and interpretation of the Christian Bible in light of "all of the Learning in the World". Mather, who continued to work on it for many years, sought to incorporate into his reading of Scripture the new scientific knowledge and theories, including geography, heliocentrism, atomism, and Newtonianism. According to Silverman, the project "looks forward to Mather's becoming probably the most influential spokesman in New England for a rationalized, scientized Christianity". Mather could not find a publisher for the Biblia Americana, which remained in manuscript form during his lifetime. It is currently being edited in ten volumes, published by Mohr Siebeck under the direction of Reiner Smolinski and Jan Stievermann. As of 2026, eight of the ten volumes have appeared in print.

== Conflict with Governor Dudley ==
In Massachusetts at the start of the 18th century, Joseph Dudley was a highly controversial figure, as he had participated actively in the government of Sir Edmund Andros in 1686–1689. Dudley was among those arrested in the revolt of 1689, and was later called to London to answer the charges against him brought by a committee of the colonists. However, Dudley was able to pursue a successful political career in Britain. Upon the death in 1701 of acting governor William Stoughton, Dudley began enlisting support in London to procure appointment as the new governor of Massachusetts.

Although the Mathers (to whom he was related by marriage) continued to resent Dudley's role in the Andros administration, they eventually came around to the view that Dudley would now be preferable as governor to the available alternatives, at a time when the English Parliament was threatening to repeal the Massachusetts Charter. With the Mathers' support, Dudley was appointed governor by the Crown and returned to Boston in 1702. Contrary to the promises that he had made to the Mathers, Governor Dudley proved a divisive and high-handed executive, reserving his patronage for a small circle composed of transatlantic merchants, Anglicans, and religious liberals such as Thomas Brattle, Benjamin Colman, and John Leverett.

In the context of Queen Anne's War (1702–1713), Cotton Mather preached and published against Governor Dudley, whom Mather accused of corruption and misgovernment. Mather sought unsuccessfully to have Dudley replaced by Sir Charles Hobby. Outmaneuvered by Dudley, this political rivalry left Mather increasingly isolated at a time when Massachusetts society was steadily moving away from the Puritan tradition that Mather represented.

== Relationship with Harvard and Yale ==
Cotton Mather was a fellow of Harvard College from 1690 to 1702, and at various times sat on its Board of Overseers. His father Increase had succeeded John Rogers as president of Harvard in 1684, first as acting president (1684–1686), later with the title of "rector" (1686–1692, during much of which period he was away from Massachusetts, pleading the Puritans' case before the Royal Court in London), and finally with the full title of president (1692–1701). Increase was unwilling to move permanently to the Harvard campus in Cambridge, Massachusetts, since his congregation in Boston was much larger than the Harvard student body, which at the time counted only a few dozen. Instructed by a committee of the Massachusetts General Assembly that the president of Harvard had to reside in Cambridge and preach to the students in person, Increase resigned in 1701 and was replaced by the Rev. Samuel Willard as acting president.

Cotton Mather sought the presidency of Harvard, but in 1708 the fellows instead appointed a layman, John Leverett, who had the support of Governor Dudley. The Mathers disapproved of the increasing independence and liberalism of the Harvard faculty, which they regarded as laxity. Cotton Mather came to see the Collegiate School, which had moved in 1716 from Saybrook to New Haven, Connecticut, as a better vehicle for preserving the Puritan orthodoxy in New England. In 1718, Cotton convinced Boston-born British businessman Elihu Yale to make a charitable gift sufficient to ensure the school's survival. It was also Mather who suggested that the school change its name to Yale College after it accepted that donation.

Cotton Mather sought the presidency of Harvard again after Leverett's death in 1724, but the fellows offered the position to the Rev. Joseph Sewall (son of Judge Samuel Sewall, who had repented publicly for his role in the Salem witch trials). When Sewall turned it down, Mather once again hoped that he might get the appointment. Instead, the fellows offered it to one of its own number, the Rev. Benjamin Coleman, an old rival of Mather. When Coleman refused it, the presidency went finally to the Rev. Benjamin Wadsworth.

== Advocacy for smallpox inoculation ==
The practice of smallpox inoculation (as distinguished from to the later practice of vaccination) was developed possibly in 8th-century India or 10th-century China and by the 17th-century had reached Turkey. It was also practiced in western Africa, but it is not known when it started there. Inoculation or, rather, variolation, involved infecting a person via a cut in the skin with exudate from a patient with a relatively mild case of smallpox (variola), to bring about a manageable and recoverable infection that would provide later immunity. By the beginning of the 18th century, the Royal Society in England was discussing the practice of inoculation, and the smallpox epidemic in 1713 spurred further interest. It was not until 1721, however, that England recorded its first case of inoculation.

=== Early New England ===
Smallpox was a serious threat in colonial America, most devastating to Native Americans, but also to Anglo-American settlers. New England suffered smallpox epidemics in 1677, 1689–90, and 1702. It was highly contagious, and mortality could reach as high as 30 percent. Boston had been plagued by smallpox outbreaks in 1690 and 1702. During this era, public authorities in Massachusetts dealt with the threat primarily by means of quarantine. Incoming ships were quarantined in Boston Harbor, and any smallpox patients in town were held under guard or in a "pesthouse".

In 1716, Onesimus, one of Mather's slaves, explained to Mather how he had been inoculated as a child in Africa. Mather was fascinated by the idea. By July 1716, he had read an endorsement of inoculation by Dr Emanuel Timonius of Constantinople in the Philosophical Transactions. Mather then declared, in a letter to Dr John Woodward of Gresham College in London, that he planned to press Boston's doctors to adopt the practice of inoculation should smallpox reach the colony again.

By 1721, a whole generation of young Bostonians was vulnerable and memories of the last epidemic's horrors had by and large disappeared. Smallpox returned on April 22 of that year, when HMS Seahorse arrived from the West Indies carrying smallpox on board. Despite attempts to protect the town through quarantine, nine known cases of smallpox appeared in Boston by May 27, and by mid-June, the disease was spreading at an alarming rate. As a new wave of smallpox hit the area and continued to spread, a number of residents fled to outlying rural settlements. The combination of exodus, quarantine, and outside traders' fears disrupted business in the capital of the Bay Colony for weeks. Guards were stationed at the House of Representatives to keep Bostonians from entering without special permission. The death toll reached 101 in September, and the Selectmen, powerless to stop it, "severely limited the length of time funeral bells could toll". As one response, legislators delegated a thousand pounds from the treasury to help the people who, under these conditions, could no longer support their families.

On June 6, 1721, Mather sent an abstract of reports on inoculation by Timonius and Jacobus Pylarinus to local physicians, urging them to consult about the matter. He received no response. Next, Mather pleaded his case to Dr. Zabdiel Boylston, who tried the procedure on his youngest son and two slaves—one grown and one a boy. All recovered in about a week. Boylston inoculated seven more people by mid-July. The epidemic peaked in October 1721, with 411 deaths; by February 26, 1722, Boston was again free from smallpox. The total number of cases since April 1721 came to 5,889, with 844 deaths—more than three-quarters of all the deaths in Boston during 1721. Meanwhile, Boylston had inoculated 287 people, with six resulting deaths.

=== Inoculation debate ===
Boylston and Mather's inoculation crusade "raised a horrid Clamour" among the people of Boston. Both Boylston and Mather were "Object[s] of their Fury; their furious Obloquies and Invectives", which Mather acknowledges in his diary. Boston's Selectmen, consulting a doctor who claimed that the practice caused many deaths and only spread the infection, forbade Boylston from performing it again.

The New-England Courant published writers who opposed the practice. The editorial stance was that the Boston populace feared that inoculation spread, rather than prevented, the disease; however, some historians, notably H. W. Brands, have argued that this position was a result of the contrarian positions of editor-in-chief James Franklin (a brother of Benjamin Franklin). Public discourse ranged in tone from organized arguments by John Williams from Boston, who posted that "several arguments proving that inoculating the smallpox is not contained in the law of Physick, either natural or divine, and therefore unlawful", to those put forth in a pamphlet by Dr. William Douglass of Boston, entitled The Abuses and Scandals of Some Late Pamphlets in Favour of Inoculation of the Small Pox (1721), on the qualifications of inoculation's proponents. (Douglass was exceptional at the time for holding a medical degree from Europe.) At the extreme, in November 1721, someone hurled a lighted grenade into Mather's home.

==== Medical opposition ====
Several opponents of smallpox inoculation, among them John Williams, stated that there were only two laws of physick (medicine): sympathy and antipathy. In his estimation, inoculation was neither a sympathy toward a wound or a disease, or an antipathy toward one, but the creation of one. For this reason, its practice violated the natural laws of medicine, transforming health care practitioners into those who harm rather than heal.

As with most colonists, Williams' Puritan beliefs were enmeshed in every aspect of his life, and he used the Bible to state his case. He quoted Matthew 9:12, when Jesus said: "It is not the healthy who need a doctor, but the sick." William Douglass proposed a more secular argument against inoculation, stressing the importance of reason over passion and urging the public to be pragmatic in their choices. In addition, he demanded that ministers leave the practice of medicine to physicians, and not meddle in areas where they lacked expertise. According to Douglass, smallpox inoculation was "a medical experiment of consequence", one not to be undertaken lightly. He believed that not all learned individuals were qualified to doctor others, and while ministers took on several roles in the early years of the colony, including that of caring for the sick, they were now expected to stay out of state and civil affairs. Douglass felt that inoculation caused more deaths than it prevented. The only reason Mather had had success in it, he said, was because Mather had used it on children, who are naturally more resilient. Douglass vowed to always speak out against "the wickedness of spreading infection". Speak out he did: "The battle between these two prestigious adversaries [Douglass and Mather] lasted far longer than the epidemic itself, and the literature accompanying the controversy was both vast and venomous."

==== Puritan resistance ====
Generally, Puritan pastors favored the inoculation experiments. Increase Mather, Cotton's father, was joined by prominent pastors Benjamin Colman and William Cooper in openly propagating the use of inoculations. "One of the classic assumptions of the Puritan mind was that the will of God was to be discerned in nature as well as in revelation." Nevertheless, Williams questioned whether the smallpox "is not one of the strange works of God; and whether inoculation of it be not a fighting with the most High". He also asked his readers if the smallpox epidemic may have been given to them by God as "punishment for sin", and warned that attempting to shield themselves from God's fury (via inoculation), would only serve to "provoke him more".

Puritans found meaning in affliction, and they did not yet know why God was showing them disfavor through smallpox. Not to address their errant ways before attempting a cure could set them back in their "errand". Many Puritans believed that creating a wound and inserting poison was doing violence and therefore was antithetical to the healing art. They grappled with adhering to the Ten Commandments, with being proper church members and good caring neighbors. The apparent contradiction between harming or murdering a neighbor through inoculation and the Sixth Commandment—"thou shalt not kill"—seemed insoluble and hence stood as one of the main objections against the procedure. Williams maintained that because the subject of inoculation could not be found in the Bible, it was not the will of God, and therefore "unlawful". He explained that inoculation violated The Golden Rule, because if one neighbor voluntarily infected another with disease, he was not doing unto others as he would have done to him. With the Bible as the Puritans' source for all decision-making, lack of scriptural evidence concerned many, and Williams vocally scorned Mather for not being able to reference an inoculation edict directly from the Bible.

==== Inoculation defended ====
With the smallpox epidemic catching speed and racking up a staggering death toll, a solution to the crisis was becoming more urgently needed by the day. The use of quarantine and various other efforts, such as balancing the body's humors, did not slow the spread of the disease. As news rolled in from town to town and correspondence arrived from overseas, reports of horrific stories of suffering and loss due to smallpox stirred mass panic among the people. "By circa 1700, smallpox had become among the most devastating of epidemic diseases circulating in the Atlantic world."

Mather strongly challenged the perception that inoculation was against the will of God and argued the procedure was not outside of Puritan principles. He wrote that "whether a Christian may not employ this Medicine (let the matter of it be what it will) and humbly give Thanks to God's good Providence in discovering of it to a miserable World; and humbly look up to His Good Providence (as we do in the use of any other Medicine) It may seem strange, that any wise Christian cannot answer it. And how strangely do Men that call themselves Physicians betray their Anatomy, and their Philosophy, as well as their Divinity in their invectives against this Practice?" The Puritan minister began to embrace the sentiment that smallpox was an inevitability for anyone, both the good and the wicked, yet God had provided them with the means to save themselves. Mather reported that, from his view, "none that have used it ever died of the Small Pox, tho at the same time, it were so malignant, that at least half the People died, that were infected With it in the Common way".

While Mather was experimenting with the procedure, prominent Puritan pastors Benjamin Colman and William Cooper expressed public and theological support for them. The practice of smallpox inoculation was eventually accepted by the general population due to first-hand experiences and personal relationships. Although many were initially wary of the concept, it was because people were able to witness the procedure's consistently positive results, within their own community of ordinary citizens, that it became widely utilized and supported. One important change in the practice after 1721 was regulated quarantine of inoculees.

=== The aftermath ===
Although Mather and Boylston were able to demonstrate the efficacy of the practice, the debate over inoculation would continue even beyond the epidemic of 1721–22. After overcoming considerable difficulty and achieving notable success, Boylston traveled to London in 1725, where he published his results and was elected to the Royal Society in 1726, with Mather formally receiving the honor two years prior.

== Other scientific work ==
In 1716, Mather used different varieties of maize ("Indian corn") to conduct one of the first recorded experiments on plant hybridization. He described the results in a letter to his friend James Petiver:

First: my Friend planted a Row of Indian corn that was Coloured Red and Blue; the rest of the Field being planted with corn of the yellow, which is the most usual color. To the Windward side, this Red and Blue Row, so infected Three or Four whole Rows, as to communicate the same Colour unto them; and part of ye Fifth and some of ye Sixth. But to the Leeward Side, no less than Seven or Eight Rows, had ye same Colour communicated unto them; and some small Impressions were made on those that were yet further off.

In his Curiosa Americana (1712–1724) collection, Mather also announced that flowering plants reproduce sexually, an observation that later became the basis of the Linnaean system of plant classification. Mather may also have been the first to develop the concept of genetic dominance, which later would underpin Mendelian genetics.

In 1713, the Secretary of the Royal Society of London, naturalist Richard Waller, informed Mather that he had been elected as a fellow of the Society. Mather was the eighth colonial American to join that learned body, with the first having been John Winthrop the Younger in 1662. During the controversies surrounding Mather's smallpox inoculation campaign of 1721, his adversaries questioned that credential on the grounds that Mather's name did not figure in the published lists of the Society's members. At the time, the Society responded that those published lists included only members who had been inducted in person and who were therefore entitled to vote in the Society's yearly elections. In May 1723, Mather's correspondent John Woodward discovered that, although Mather had been duly nominated in 1713, approved by the council, and informed by Waller of his election at that time, due to an oversight the nomination had not in fact been voted upon by the full assembly of fellows or the vote had not been recorded. After Woodward informed the Society of the situation, the members proceeded to elect Mather by a formal vote.

Mather's enthusiasm for experimental science was strongly influenced by his reading of Robert Boyle's work. Mather was a significant popularizer of the new scientific knowledge and promoted Copernican heliocentrism in some of his sermons. He also argued against the spontaneous generation of life and compiled a medical manual titled The Angel of Bethesda that he hoped would assist people who were unable to procure the services of a physician, but which went unpublished in Mather's lifetime. This was the only comprehensive medical work written in colonial English-speaking America. Although much of what Mather included in that manual were folk remedies now regarded as unscientific or superstitious, some of them are still valid, including smallpox inoculation and the use of citrus juice to treat scurvy. Mather also outlined an early form of germ theory and discussed psychogenic diseases, while recommending hygiene, physical exercise, temperate diet, and avoidance of tobacco smoking.

In his later years, Mather also promoted the professionalization of scientific research in America. He presented a Boston tradesman named Grafton Feveryear with the barometer that Feveryear used to make the first quantitative meteorological observations in New England, which he communicated to the Royal Society in 1727. Mather also sponsored Isaac Greenwood, a Harvard graduate and member of Mather's church, who travelled to London and collaborated with the Royal Society's curator of experiments, John Theophilus Desaguliers. Greenwood later became the first Hollis professor of mathematics and natural philosophy at Harvard, and may well have been the first American to practice science professionally.

== Slavery and racial attitudes ==
Cotton Mather's household included both free servants and a number of slaves who performed domestic chores. Surviving records indicate that, over the course of his lifetime, Mather owned at least three, and probably more, slaves. Like the majority of Christians at the time, but unlike his political rival, Judge Samuel Sewall, Mather was never an abolitionist, although he did publicly denounce what he regarded as the illegal and inhuman aspects of the burgeoning Atlantic slave trade. Concerned about the New England sailors enslaved in Africa since the 1680s and 1690s, in 1698 Mather wrote them his Pastoral Letter to the Captives, consoling them, and expressing hope that "your slavery to the monsters of Africa will be but short". On the return of some survivors of African slavery in 1703, Mather published The History of What the Goodness of God has done for the Captives, lately delivered out of Barbary, wherein he lamented the death of multiple American slaves, the length of their captivity—which he described as between 7 and 19 years,—the harsh conditions of their bondage, and celebrated their refusal to convert to Islam, unlike others who did.

In his book The Negro Christianized (1706), Mather insisted that slaveholders should treat their black slaves humanely and instruct them in Christianity with a view to promoting their salvation. Mather received black members of his congregation in his home and he paid a schoolteacher to instruct local black people in reading. Mather consistently held that black Africans were "of one Blood" with the rest of mankind and that blacks and whites would meet as equals in Heaven. After a number of black people carried out arson attacks in Boston in 1723, Mather asked the outraged white Bostonians whether the black population had been "always treated according to the Rules of Humanity? Are they treated as those, that are of one Blood with us, and those who have Immortal Souls in them, and are not mere Beasts of Burden?"

Mather advocated the Christianization of black slaves both on religious grounds and as tending to make them more patient and faithful servants of their masters. In The Negro Christianized, Mather argued against the opinion of Richard Baxter that a Christian could not enslave another baptized Christian. The African slave Onesimus, from whom Mather first learned about smallpox inoculation, had been purchased for him as a gift by his congregation in 1706. Despite his efforts, Mather was unable to convert Onesimus to Christianity and finally manumitted him in 1716.

== Sermons against pirates and piracy ==
Throughout his career Mather was also keen to minister to convicted pirates. He produced a number of pamphlets and sermons concerning piracy, including Faithful Warnings to prevent Fearful Judgments; Instructions to the Living, from the Condition of the Dead; The Converted Sinner... A Sermon Preached in Boston, May 31, 1724, In the Hearing and at the Desire of certain Pirates; A Brief Discourse occasioned by a Tragical Spectacle of a Number of Miserables under Sentence of Death for Piracy; Useful Remarks. An Essay upon Remarkables in the Way of Wicked Men and The Vial Poured Out Upon the Sea. His father Increase had preached at the trial of Dutch pirate Peter Roderigo; Cotton Mather in turn preached at the trials and sometimes executions of pirate Captains (or the crews of) William Fly, John Quelch, Samuel Bellamy, William Kidd, Charles Harris, and John Phillips. He also ministered to Thomas Hawkins, Thomas Pound, and William Coward; having been convicted of piracy, they were jailed alongside "Mary Glover the Irish Catholic witch", daughter of witch "Goody" Ann Glover at whose trial Mather had also preached.

In his conversations with William Fly and his crew Mather scolded them: "You have something within you, that will compell you to confess, That the Things which you have done, are most Unreasonable and Abominable. The Robberies and Piracies, you have committed, you can say nothing to Justify them. ... It is a most hideous Article in the Heap of Guilt lying on you, that an Horrible Murder is charged upon you; There is a cry of Blood going up to Heaven against you."

== Death and place of burial ==
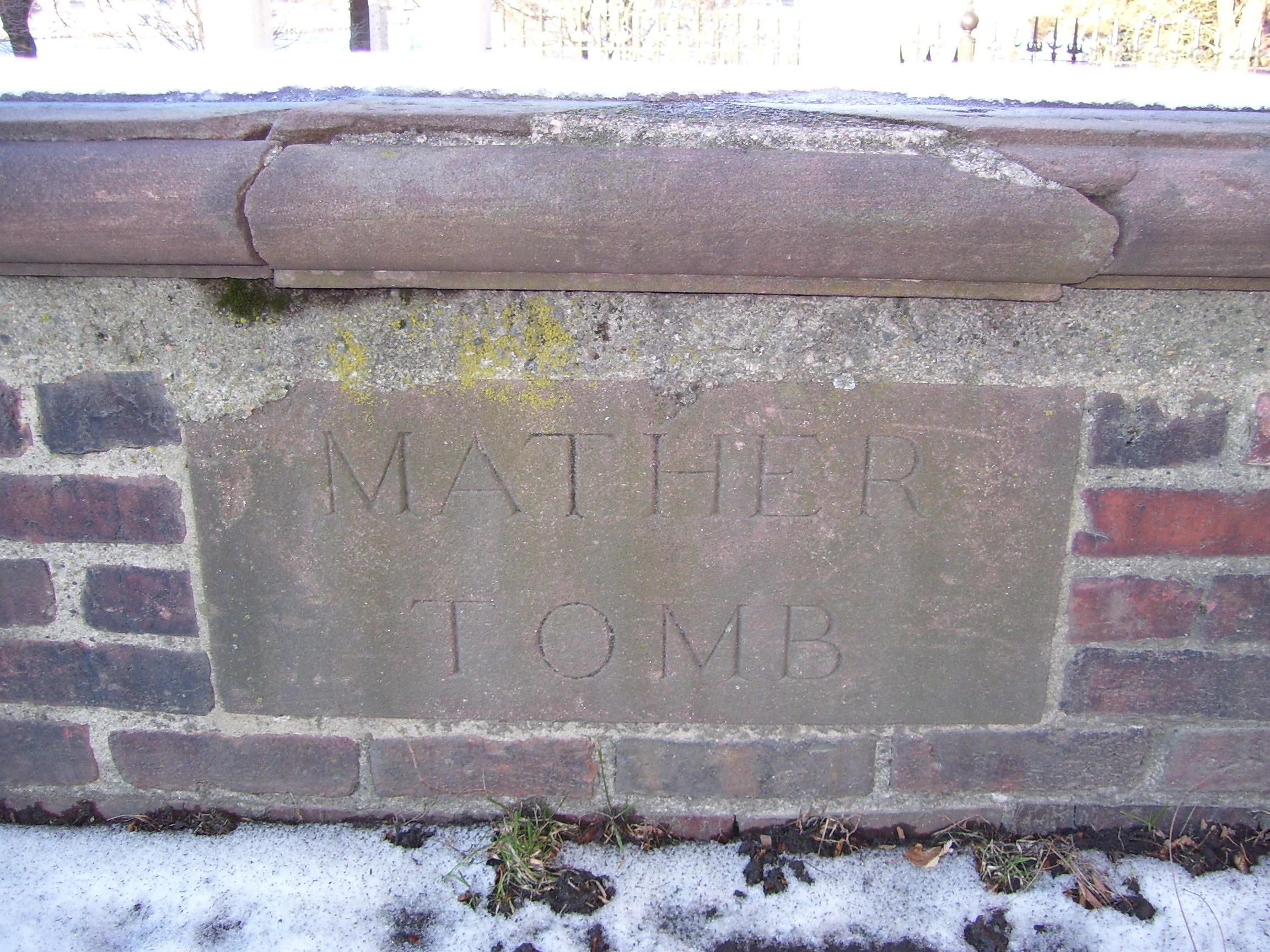
The Mather tomb in Copp's Hill Cemetery in Boston

Cotton Mather was twice widowed, and only two of his 15 children survived him. He died on the day after his 65th birthday and was buried on Copp's Hill Burying Ground, in Boston's North End.

== Works ==
Mather was a prolific writer and industrious in having his works printed, including a vast number of his sermons.

Major

- Memorable Providences (1689) his first full book, on the subject of witchcraft
- Wonders of the Invisible World (1692) his second major book, also on witchcraft, sent to London in October, 1692
- Pillars of Salt (1699)
- Magnalia Christi Americana (1702)
- The Negro Christianized (1706)
- Corderius Americanus: A Discourse on the Good Education of Children (1708)
- Bonifacius (1710)
- The Christian Philosopher. 1721.

=== Pillars of Salt ===
Mather's first published sermon, printed in 1686, concerned the execution of James Morgan, convicted of murder. Thirteen years later, Mather published the sermon in a compilation, along with other similar works, called Pillars of Salt.

=== Magnalia Christi Americana ===
Magnalia Christi Americana, considered Mather's greatest work, was published in 1702, when he was 39. The book includes several biographies of saints and describes the process of the New England settlement. In this context "saints" does not refer to the canonized saints of the Catholic church, but to those Puritan divines about whom Mather is writing. It comprises seven total books, including Pietas in Patriam: The life of His Excellency Sir William Phips, originally published anonymously in London in 1697. Despite being one of Mather's best-known works, some have openly criticized it, labeling it as hard to follow and understand, and poorly paced and organized. However, other critics have praised Mather's work, citing it as one of the best efforts at properly documenting the establishment of America and growth of the people.

=== The Christian Philosopher ===
In 1721, Mather published The Christian Philosopher, the first systematic book on science published in America. Mather attempted to show how Newtonian science and religion were in harmony. It was in part based on Robert Boyle's The Christian Virtuoso (1690). Mather took inspiration from Hayy ibn Yaqdhan, by the 12th-century Islamic philosopher Abu Bakr Ibn Tufail.

Mather's short treatise on the Lord's Supper was later translated by his cousin Josiah Cotton.

== In popular culture ==
=== Comic books ===
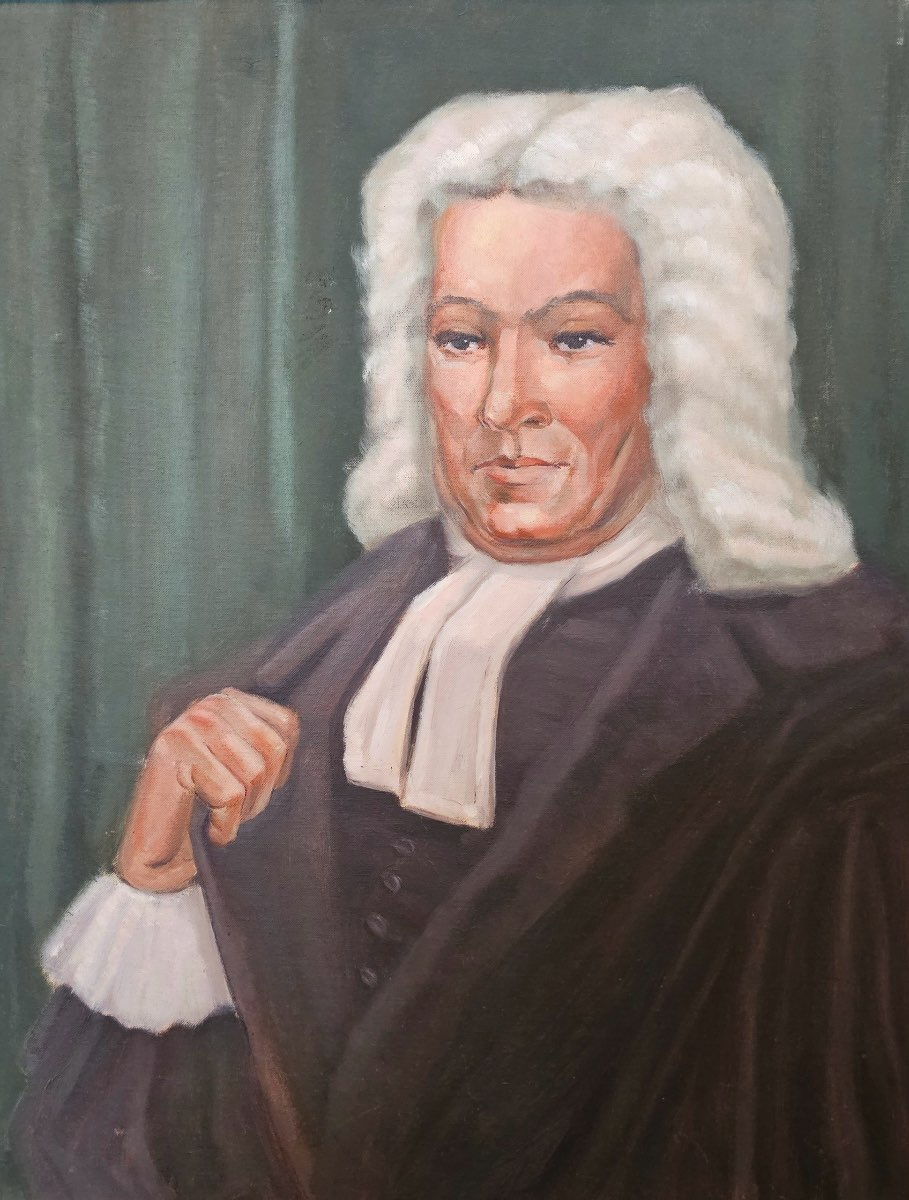
Mid 20th century painting of Cotton. Painted for the American Literature Collection.

Marvel Comics features a supervillain character named Cotton Mather with alias name, 'Witch-Slayer', that is an enemy of Spider-Man.

He first appears in the 1972 comic 'Marvel Team-Up' issue #41, and appears in the subsequent issues until issue #45.

=== Music ===
The rock band Cotton Mather is named after Mather.

The Handsome Family's 2006 album Last Days of Wonder is named in reference to Mather's 1693 book Wonders of the Invisible World, which lyricist Rennie Sparks found intriguing because of what she called its "madness brimming under the surface of things".

=== Radio ===
Howard da Silva portrayed Mather in Burn, Witch, Burn, a December 15, 1975 episode of the CBS Radio Mystery Theater.

=== Literature ===
One of the stories in Richard Brautigan′s collection Revenge of the Lawn is called ″1692 Cotton Mather Newsreel″.

Mather is mentioned in several of the New England horror stories of H.P. Lovecraft, such as "The Picture in the House", "The Unnamable" and "Pickman's Model".

=== Television ===
Seth Gabel portrays Cotton Mather in the TV series Salem, which aired from 2014 to 2017.

== See also ==
- Charles Colcock Jones
- Increase Mather
- Salem Witch Trials
- Evangelicalism

== Sources ==
- Bancroft, George (1874–1878). History of the United States of America, From the Discovery of the American Continent. Boston: Little, Brown, & Co. LCCN 09016693.
- Claudio, Vicki, ed. (2012). A Pastoral Letter to the Captives. Exagorazo Press. ISBN 978-1441417930.
