= The Angel of Bethesda =

Book by Puritan minister Cotton Mather

The Angel of Bethesda is a book written by Cotton Mather, a Puritan minister from Massachusetts, in 1724. The book would not be published until the 20th century, long after Mather's death in 1728. It explains many illnesses in a spiritual context, attributing illnesses to demonic and divine sources. It also endorsed the use of repentance and traditional folk medicine as treatments for mental illness. The text blamed afflicted individuals for their own sickness.

== See also ==
- Faith healing
