= Albert D. Mather =

American politician and theologian

Member of the South Dakota House of Representatives
- In office 1905–1905

Personal details
- Born: Albert Douglas Mather; January 8, 1851 Wisconsin, U.S.
- Died: February 12, 1940 (aged 89) Yankton County, South Dakota, U.S.
- Party: Republican
- Relatives: Cotton Mather (ancestor)
- Occupation: Theologian

Albert Douglas Mather (January 8, 1851 – February 12, 1940) was an American politician and theologian. A member of the Republican Party, he served in the South Dakota House of Representatives in 1905.
