= The Christian Virtuoso =

1690 book by Robert Boyle

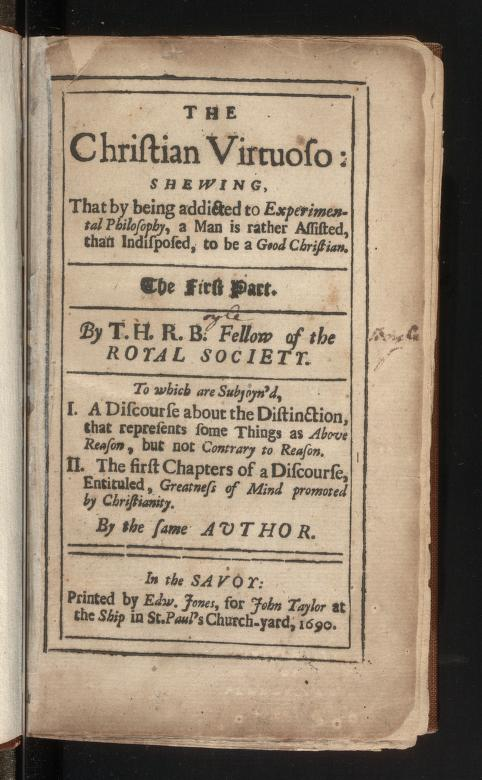
Title page of The Christian Virtuoso (1690)

The Christian Virtuoso (1690) was one of the last books published by Robert Boyle, who was a champion of his Anglican faith. This book summarised his religious views, including his idea of a clockwork universe created by God. Boyle was a devout Anglican, and with the rise of science and reason during his lifetime, was troubled by increasing atheism. This spurred him to write about his belief of science and religion supporting each other.

== Contents ==
On this book's title page (see picture) Boyle states "that, being addicted to experimental philosophy a man is rather assisted than indisposed to be a good Christian." And this principle is what he sets out to show. The Christian Virtuoso summarized Boyle's views that the study of God's handiwork was a religious duty and that by studying God's handiwork, God's goodness and overarching existence would be illuminated. Some see The Christian Virtuoso as a manifesto of Boyle's life as the ideal Christian scientist.

== John Locke's review ==
John Locke read and reviewed a manuscript of the book in 1681.

== Meaning of the word virtuoso ==
In the early 17th century the word virtuoso first referred to a gentleman interested in precious stones and antiquities. In the title Boyle equates a natural philosopher (later to be called a scientist) with a virtuoso, which by the middle of 17th century had already begun to take on this meaning.

== Its influence ==
This book was in part the basis for Cotton Mather's 1721 book The Christian Philosopher.

== Boyle's religious views ==
The historian and Oxford University Science and Religion theologian John Hedley Brooke has pointed out that one of many ironies in the history of religion and science interactions is that while the 17th century Boyle used the idea of a clockwork universe "to affirm God's sovereignty," 18th century deists would use the same clockwork image "to attack established religion." Boyle saw scientific inquiry as a form of religious worship; a view shared by other 17th century scientific figures such as John Ray. Explicit in Boyle's writings are the images of nature as temple and the scientist as priest.

Besides The Christian Virtuoso, Boyle also wrote at least three other works championing his Christian faith. These were Of the high Veneration Man's Intellect owes to God, peculiar for his Wisdom and Power (1684), Discourse Of Things Above Reason, inquiring whether a Philosopher should admit there are any such (1681), and Some Considerations touching the Style of the Holy Scriptures (1661). An 1835 book by Henry Rogers is a collection of these works.

== See also ==
- Boyle Lectures
- Faith and rationality
