= Richard Waller (naturalist) =

English naturalist, translator and illustrator

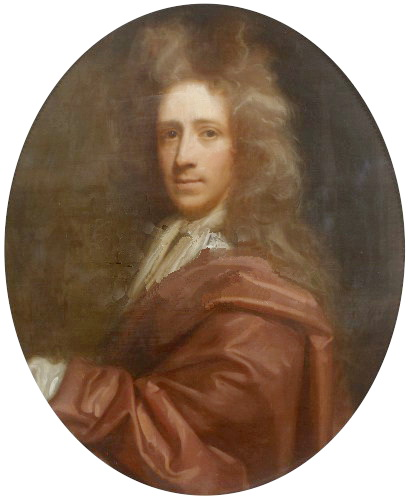
Portrait by Thomas Murray

Richard Waller FRS (d. 1715) was an English naturalist, translator and illustrator, long-time member and secretary of the Royal Society.

Little is known about his early life. He became a member of the Royal Society on 27 April 1681, acting as secretary from 1687 to 1709, and again from 1710 to 1714, and member of its council from 1686 to 1699, Vice-President during Isaac Newton’s presidency. Waller edited the Philosophical Transactions from 1691 to 1695, also acting as translator for submissions from abroad.

His Essays of Natural Experiments, a translation of the collection of essays Saggi di naturali esperienze of the Accademia del Cimento is one of the important early publications by the Royal Society. The archive of the Royal Society also holds a number of botanical illustrations by Waller, possibly intended for a publication by John Ray. His fossil drawings were rediscovered together with Robert Hooke’s drawings in the British Library. On Hooke's death in 1703, his records were entrusted to Waller, parts of which were edited by Waller and published as Hooke’s Posthumous Works (1705). Waller had an extensive library, and often exchanged books with Hooke.

In 1685, Waller married Anne Blackwell (1669–1744), a daughter of the Bristol wine merchant, Jonathan Blackwell (d. 1676), and noted for funding the construction of the Christmas Steps. Waller’s children did not survive to adulthood. Accordingly, Waller’s estate, including the library and a house in Northaw, Hertfordshire, passed to his widow Anne. She in turn made her younger brother, Jonathan Blackwell, her sole heir. Jonathan was also a Fellow of the Royal Society, and had been nominated by Waller, though apparently he was not scientifically active.

Waller most likely died at his residence in Northaw, Hertfordshire, at some point between 23 December 1714 and 13 January 1715.

== Bibliography ==
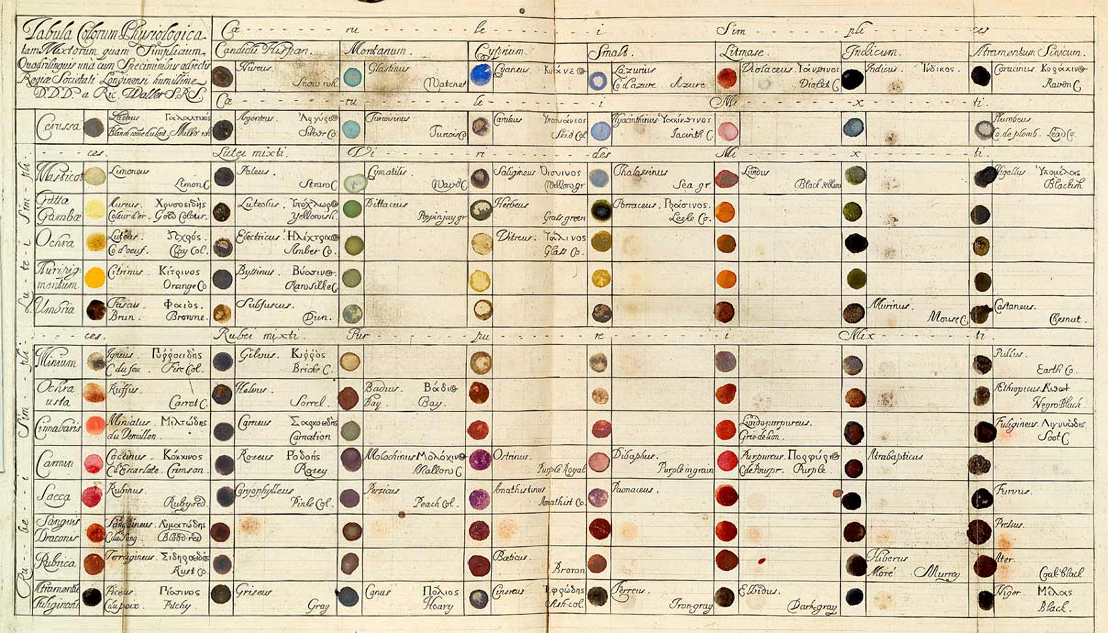
Tabula Colorum Physiologica, 1686

Philosophical Transactions

- Observations on the Cicindela Volans, or Flying Glow-Worm, with the Figure Thereof Made, and Dsiegned by Richard Waller Esq. F. of the R. S. Band 15, 1685, 841–845, doi:10.1098/rstl.1685.0003.
- A Catalogue of Simple and Mixt Colours, with a Specimen of Each Colour Prefixt to Its Proper Name. vol. 16, 1686, 24–32, doi:10.1098/rstl.1686.0005.
- Some Observations Made on the Spawn of Frogs, and of the Production of Todpoles therein. vol. 16, 1686, 523–524, doi:10.1098/rstl.1686.0096.
- Observations in the Dissection of a Paroquet. vol. 18, 1694, 153–157, doi:10.1098/rstl.1694.0031.
- Some Observations Sent from the East-Indies; Being in Answer to Some Queries Sent Thither. vol. 20, 1698, 273–277, doi:10.1098/rstl.1698.0053.
- Part of a Letter from Richard Waller, Esq; S R. S. to Dr. Hans Sloane, R. S. Secr. concerning Two Deaf Persons, Who can Speak and Understand What is Said to Them by the Motion of the Lips. vol. 25, 1706, 2468–2469, doi:10.1098/rstl.1706.0060.
- A Description of That Curious Natural Machine, the Wood-Peckers Tongue, etc. vol. 29, 1714, 509–522, doi:10.1098/rstl.1714.0067.

as translator

- Essayes of Natural Experiments made in the Academie del Cimento. Benjamin Alsop, London 1684, (online).
- The Measure of the Earth In: Perrault, Claude: Memoir's for a natural history of animals : containing the anatomical descriptions of several creatures dissected by the Royal Academy of Sciences at Paris. 1688, (online).

as editor

- The posthumous works of Robert Hooke. London 1705, (online).

== Sources ==
- Boschiero, L.: Translation, Experimentation and the Spring of the Air: Richard Waller's Essayes of Natural Experiments. In: Notes and Records of the Royal Society of London 64.1, 2010, 67–83, doi:10.1098/rsnr.2009.0026
- Ezell, M. J. M.: Richard Waller, SRS: „In the Pursuit of Nature“. In: Notes and Records of the Royal Society of London 38, 1984, 215–233, doi:10.1098/rsnr.1984.0013.
- Lyons, H. G.: Richard Waller (About 1650 to 1715). In: Notes and Records of the Royal Society of London 3, 1940, 92–94, doi:10.1098/rsnr.1940.0010.
- Lotte Mulligan: Waller, Richard (c.1660–1715). In: Oxford Dictionary of National Biography. Oxford University Press, 2008 doi:10.1093/ref:odnb/48707
