= Lydia Lee Mather =

Wife of Cotton Mather (ca. 1670–1734)

- Born: Lydia Lee ca. 1670; England
- Died: January 23, 1734 (aged 63–64)
- Other name: Lydia Lee George
- Spouses: John George; Cotton Mather
- Parent: Dr. Samuel Lee

Lydia (Lee) George Mather (ca. 1670–January 23, 1734) was the English-American wife of wealthy businessman John George and Reverend Cotton Mather. She was the mother of Katherine Howell and stepmother to five of Mather's children. Mather was a rare woman in the 17th century. She was well-informed, wealthy, and independent. She protected her financial assets before her marriage to Cotton by having a nuptial agreement drawn up and signed. Like other Colonial women of her time, she had few choices for improving her lot as a married woman. After a few years of marriage, she had a hard time dealing with the stress of her marriage and began to rage at Cotton, who became humiliated and depressed as a result, but did little to improve the situation. There seemed to be a change that came over Mather after she left Cotton for ten days. She returned after word spread to the family that Cotton's son Increase was lost at sea. She returned to their home and nursed him in his last five weeks of life.

== Early life ==
Lydia Lee, daughter of Dr. Samuel Lee, was born in England about 1670. Her father was a minister, author, and collector of naturalists accounts of Native Americans, and a collector of information about American diseases and epidemics. He was somewhat wealthy, having received a large inheritance. The Lees immigrated to the American Colonies by 1686, when Dr. Lee was asked to be a minister in a church in Bristol, in the Rhode Island colony. He built a large home for his family. Her father, educated at Oxford University, was considered an intelligent and forceful man. Cotton Mather said of him, "hardly ever a more Universally Learned Person, trod the American Strand". Lydia had three sisters.

== Marriage to John George ==
Lydia returned to the colonies by 1687, when she married John George of Boston. George was a wealthy merchant and exporter. He served as a town selectman. Their daughter Katherine was born about 1692. She married Nathan Howell, George's business partner, about 1711. They had two sons. John George died in 1714, leaving Lydia a wealthy woman.

== Marriage to Cotton Mather ==
Lydia married Cotton Mather on July 5, 1715, becoming Lydia Lee Mather. They were married by Increase Mather, Cotton's father. She was Cotton's third wife. Due to the size of her fortune, and the disparity with Cotton's financial means, Mather had a prenuptial contract drawn up that gave her complete control of "all the lands, tenements, money goods, chattels or other estates whatsoever" that Lydia had at the time of the marriage. Cotton's third wife likely came into the marriage with different points of view than his previous two wives, who likely provided "uncritical adulation and unquestioning obedience," the ideal Puritan woman being defined in the book Ornaments for the Daughters of Zion. On the other hand, Mather was independent, better educated, richer, and older. Shortly after their marriage, the Mathers moved to a large house on Ship Street, near the harbor and the wharves on the North End. It had three or four floors, a great chamber, and both a small and large parlor. Outside there were pasture land, yards, and gardens. He used a number of the rooms in the house, like his study, library, and a great hall, for church business.

Nathan Howell died in the fall of 1715, leaving her daughter Katherine a widow. She and her sons moved in with Mather and her husband. Mather became stepmother to children from Cotton's previous marriages: Abigail (21), Hannah (18), Elizabeth (11), and Samuel (9). Cotton also had a son, Increase (16), nicknamed "Cresy", who was in London at the time of their marriage and returned in May 1716. The following year he fathered an illegitimate child and in 1721 he was arrested for his role in a "night riot" in Boston. She developed good relationships with the Mather children, which may have waned over time. Two children were their servants, a Spanish Native American girl and an enslaved by named Obadiah.

Cotton wrote in his journal about their marriage, stating that he found her to be very lovely and that he enjoyed talking with her about Scripture. They prayed several times each day. In April 1716, he said of her: "how happy I am in the conversation of so fine a Soul, and one so capable of soaring to the higher Flights of piety." He admired her intelligence, and how he considered her well born and well informed. He noted how much he and the children missed her when she was away for short periods, such as "We enjoy nothing as we used to do. We are not sensible that the sun shines into any room in the house, nor that our chocolate has any sugar in it."

Mather found him to be hard to live with in some ways. He was a great minister, but he could be overbearing, certain that he was always right, and extremely pious. He also spent most of each day working in his study, coming out just for meals and prayer. Cotton began to be depressed and humiliated by Mather's rages, which were nearly always directed at him. By 1719, Cotton was finding it difficult at times to bear Mather's behavior, but he was proud of this ability to overcome her "prodigious paroxysms", a term he used to describe the behavior of people who did not agree with him. Although Cotton worried to what extend his relationship with Mather might affect his ministry, there is no evidence that anyone was aware of Mather's condition. He began writing in his journal in Latin and Greek so that she could not understand what he wrote about her. Cotton was concerned about the effect that her anger had on him and his children. He also noted in his diaries that he was concerned that she would make markings or destroy his journals.

Cotton assumed debts incurred by Mather's husband. When Cotton had to cut back on household expenses and those for his children during the economic crisis of 1719, it appears that Mather did not help out with funds from her estate.

In 1721, Cotton sent his daughters Hannah and Elizabeth to a boarding school, to remove them from the influences of Mather's niece who lived with them for a while. During the smallpox epidemic, Mather stayed with her daughter Katherine and her family on Spectacle Island in the Boston Harbor. Cotton's daughter Abigail and her newborn baby died of the disease. Cotton's father, Increase, had a debilitating stroke and died the following year.

In July 1721, Cotton found that his salary could not adequately support him. He borrowed some money from his son Increase and sold some of his clothes to bring in funds. To provide his son Samuel an education at Harvard College, he arranged for a scholarship. He was warned in April 1724 that if he did not get his finances in order, he would go to debtors' prison. Mather became increasingly angry and Cotton began calling her deranged. Cotton's congregation collected £200 sterling for him, which was used to pay off his debts on July 31, 1724. He wrote that he was surprised to see that miraculously Mather was restored to "a new and healthy state", where instead of raging "she embraced me with the highest ardors of love." By August 13, he wrote that she was very angry and said that she could not live with him. She moved out, but returned ten days later after she learned that Cotton's son, Increase, was considered lost at sea. He made no further entries about Mather being angry. By that time, Mather's niece seems to have left the house and some of his debts were paid. Increase and Abigail had died, and the rest of his children were moving on with their lives. Samuel had graduated from Harvard and was becoming a minister, Elizabeth had married, and Hannah was living elsewhere.

== Cotton's management of Nathan Howell's estate ==
Although Cotton was not a good financial manager, he accepted Katherine Howell's request that he administer her husband Nathan Howell's estate. From the start, the estate was in disarray and there were regular visits to the court to answer to claim against the estate. He was due to provide an accounting to Howell's estate on June 4, 1717, but there is no record of an accounting until 1720. In 1717, Katherine married Samuel Sewall, Cotton's nephew, who also pressed Cotton on the status of the estate.

At some point, Lydia realized that Cotton had spent some of the money from Howell's estate. He may have felt right, in God's eyes, to have made a donation to Yale College (now Yale University), named after his friend Elihu Yale. Puritans approved of the college for its "strict observance of Calvinist doctrine". In November 1719, Cotton wrote in his journal that he was considering asking Mather if there were any funds "remaining from any Estate" remaining for a donation.

== Death ==
After five weeks in which Mather took care of her sick husband, Cotton died on February 15, 1728. She received one-third of his estate, valued at £245 sterling. Mather died on January 23, 1734.

== Legacy ==
After Mather's death, scholars and Cotton's biographers researched his journals and decided that she was insane, mad, crazed, and deranged. Kenneth Silverman, a recent biographer, described her as "vain, jealous, manipulative, and perhaps psychopathic"... which became "signs of mental breakdown." Although, he asserts that it is impossible to tell if she was insane.

There was contemporaneous material, though, that suggested that Cotton may have been somewhat hyperbolic in his writing in his journal, based upon what was said of her in her obituary in 1734, where she was described as "virtuous"; in the memorial sermons for him in 1728, and in the biography that his Samuel son wrote about him, The Life of the Very Reverend and Learned Cotton Mather, where he described her as a woman with "many and great accomplishments" and a "disconsolate widow".

Joshua Gee, Cotton's associate pastor at Second Church, said of Cotton's last days with Mather:

To his gracious and beloved consort, he said, "You and I must never any more retired and pray together, as we used to do; but you may now, when you go alone and pray, think that I am at the very time praising and blessing and singing hallelujahs, before the same throne of grace. I’ll meet you there as often as you please." And upon hearing her remark it, that he pleasantly smiled upon her while she was looking on him with tears at his bed-side, the day before his death, he said, "Why should I not smile, when everything looks smiling upon me."

According to Bernhard, rather than being insane, Mather may have been unhappily married, with little that she could do to rectify the situation and at a time when women were expected to submit to their husbands and to be happy.

== Sources ==
- Bernhard, Virginia (1987). "Cotton Mather's "Most Unhappy Wife": Reflections on the Uses of Historical Evidence". The New England Quarterly. 60 (3): 341–362. doi:10.2307/365020. ISSN 0028-4866.
- Silverman, Kenneth (1984). The life and times of Cotton Mather. New York : Harper & Row. ISBN 978-0-06-015231-4.
- Waldrup, Carole Chandler (2004). More Colonial women : 25 pioneers of early America. Jefferson, N.C. : McFarland & Co. ISBN 978-0-7864-1839-8.
