= Onesimus (Bostonian) =

African man enslaved in Boston

Onesimus (late 1600s–1700s) was an African (likely Akan) man who was instrumental in the mitigation of smallpox in Boston, Massachusetts.

He introduced his enslaver, Puritan clergyman Cotton Mather, to the principle and procedure of the variolation method of inoculation, which prevented smallpox and laid the foundation for the development of vaccines.

After a smallpox outbreak began in Boston in 1721, Mather proliferated Onesimus's knowledge to advocate for inoculation in the population. This practice eventually spread to other colonies.

Recognition for Onesimus's contributions to medical science came in 2016, when the Boston magazine declared him among the 100 Best Bostonians of All Time. Historian Ted Widmer of CUNY's Macaulay Honors College noted that "Onesimus reversed many of [the colonists'] traditional racial assumptions... [h]e had a lot more knowledge medically than most of the Europeans in Boston at that time."

== Early life and enslavement ==
Onesimus's name at birth and place of birth are unknown with certainty. He was first documented as living in the colonies in 1706, having been brought to North America as an enslaved person. In December of that year, he was given as a gift to the Puritan minister Cotton Mather by his congregation at North Church. Mather was known as a prominent figure in the Salem witch trials. Mather renamed him after a first-century AD enslaved person mentioned in the Bible. The name, "Onesimus" means "useful, helpful, or profitable".

Mather referred to the ethnicity of Onesimus as "Guaramantee", which may refer to the Coromantee (also known as Akan people of modern Ghana).

Mather saw Onesimus as highly intelligent and educated him in reading and writing with the Mather family (for context, according to biographer Kathryn Koo, at that time, literacy was primarily associated with religious instruction, and writing as means of note-taking and conducting business).

== Inoculation advocacy and controversy ==
Enquiring of my Negro-man Onesimus, who is a pretty Intelligent Fellow, Whether he ever had the Small-Pox; he answered, both, Yes, and No; and then told me, that he had undergone an Operation, which had given him something of the Small-Pox, and would forever preserve him from it, adding that it was often used among the Guramantese, & whoever had the Courage to use it, was forever free from the Fear of the Contagion. He described the Operation to me, and showed me in his Arm the Scar.

— Mather, in a 1716 letter to the Royal Society of London, on his introduction to inoculation from Onesimus

In 1716 or shortly before, Onesimus had described to Mather the process of inoculation that had been performed on him and others in his society in Africa (as Mather reported in a letter): "People take Juice of Small-Pox; and Cut the Skin, and put in a drop." In the book, African Medical Knowledge, the Plain Style, and Satire in the 1721 Boston Inoculation Controversy, Kelly Wisecup wrote that Onesimus is believed to have been inoculated at some point before being sold into slavery or during the slave trade, as he most likely traveled from the West Indies to Boston. The variolation method of inoculation was long practiced in Africa among sub-Saharan people. The practice was widespread among enslaved colonial people from many regions of Africa and, throughout the slave trade in the Americas, slave communities continued the practice of inoculation despite regional origin.

Mather followed Onesimus's medicinal advice because, as Margot Minardi writes, "inferiority had not yet been indelibly written onto the bodies of Africans." Additionally, Mather believed that disease, specifically smallpox, was a spiritual and physical punishment, so he saw a cure as "God's providential gift", as well as a means of receiving recognition from New England society and re-establishing the influence of religious figures in politics.

When Boston experienced a smallpox outbreak in 1721, Mather promoted inoculation as protection against it, citing Onesimus and African folk medicine as the source of the procedure. His advocacy for inoculation met resistance from those suspicious of African medicine. Doctors, ministers, laymen, and Boston city officials argued that the practice of inoculating healthy individuals would spread the disease and that it was immoral to interfere with the working of divine providence. Also, Mather was ridiculed publicly for relying on the testimony of an enslaved person. It was commonly anticipated that enslaved Africans would attempt an overthrow of white society; therefore, the medicinal wisdom of Onesimus was met with severe mistrust and assumed to be a ploy to poison white citizens. The Acts and Resolves passed in Boston, which included race-based punishments and codes to prevent enslaved or servant uprisings (because Bostonians feared conspiracy and conflict), showed a society skeptical of African medicine.

Nonetheless, a physician, Zabdiel Boylston, carried out the method Onesimus had described, which involved sticking a needle into a pustule from an infected person's body and scraping the infected needle across a healthy person's skin. Dr. Boylston first inoculated his six-year-old son and two of his slaves. Two hundred eighty individuals were inoculated during the 1721–22 Boston smallpox epidemic. The population of 280 inoculated patients experienced only six deaths (approx. 2.2 percent), compared to 844 deaths among the 5,889 non-inoculated smallpox patients (approx. 14.3 percent). An inscription on his tomb incorrectly identifies Boylston as the "first" to have introduced the practice of inoculation into America.

== Personal life ==
Onesimus earned independent wages and afforded a household for himself and the wife he took while serving the Mather family. It is unclear whether his wife was a free woman. They had two children, both of whom died before they were ten years old. His son, Onesimulus, died in 1714. Katy, his second child, died due to consumption. Culturally, Puritans believed that children "belonged to God", and parents were admonished to be prepared for the loss of a child. Likely, this belief was connected to the fact that, between 1640 and 1759, one in four children died before age ten.

After the deaths of his children, Mather attempted to convert Onesimus to Christianity, overtures Onesimus rejected. Mather saw his inability to convert the man he enslaved as his failure as a Puritan evangelist and head of his household, as Onesimus' refusal was supposed to bring God's displeasure on the Mather family. Onesimus was catechized in his free time as Mather attempted to convert him to Christianity. Onesimus' refusal to convert led to Mather's unhappiness with his presence in the household. Mather's diary reports "stubborn behavior" from Onesimus following the death of his children.

In 1716, Onesimus attempted to buy his freedom from Mather, raising funds to "purchase" another enslaved man named Obadiah to take his place. Mather placed conditions on his release however, requiring that he remain available to perform work in the Mather household at their command and return five pounds that Mather claimed that Onesimus had stolen from him.

== Legacy ==
Boston and London, in 1726 and 1722, respectively, performed trials on citizens, and, on average, inoculation decreased the mortality rate from 17% to 2% of the infected population.

In 1796, the inoculation methodology Onesimus introduced was replaced by Edward Jenner's development of vaccination for smallpox and cowpox. Thereafter, vaccination became compulsory in Wales and England, and variolation was banned for its side effects. In 1980, the World Health Organization declared that smallpox had been completely eradicated due to global immunization efforts, making it the first and only human infectious disease for which this has been accomplished.

== See also ==
- Jane Minor, African-American healer and slave emancipator

== Footnotes ==
=== Works cited ===
- Koo, Kathryn (2007). "Strangers in the House of God: Cotton Mather, Onesimus, and an Experiment in Christian Slaveholding" (PDF). Proceedings of the American Antiquarian Society. 117: 143–75.
- Hayden, Christopher Ellis (2008). Of Medicine and Statecraft: Smallpox and Early Colonial Vaccination in French West Africa (Senegal-Guinea) (Thesis). Evanston, IL: Northwestern University. p. 229. doi:10.21985/N2SM7H.
- Yancey, Philip; Stafford, Tim (2011). Student Bible: New International Version. Grand Rapids, MI: Biblica. ISBN 978-0-31043731-4.
