= List of memorials to Robert Hooke =

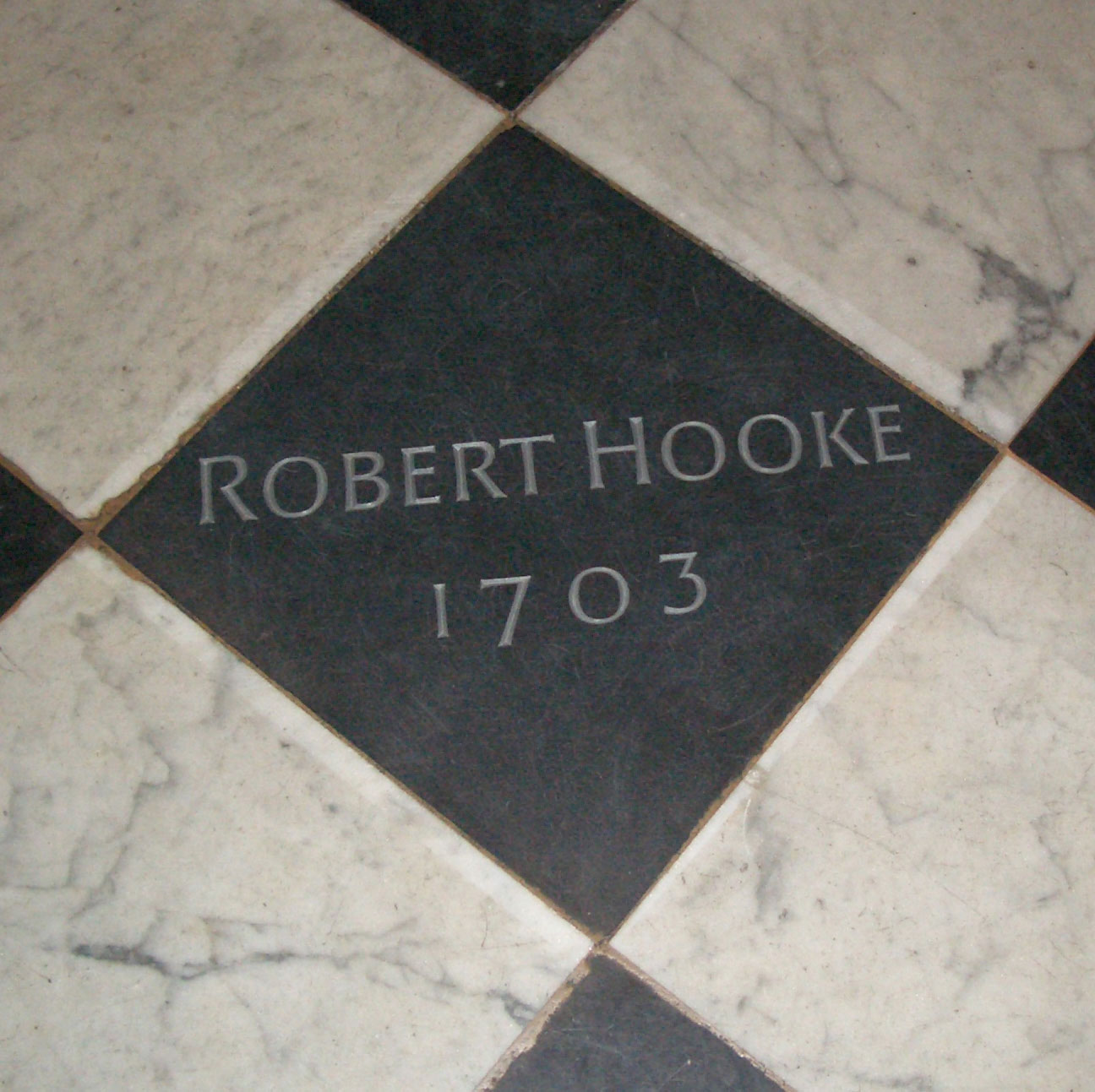
Inscription to Hooke in Westminster Abbey.

Robert Hooke, a major figure of 17th-century England, died essentially unmemorialized. With no immediate family, and with personal disputes with many members of the Royal Society, no memorials were erected in his honour on the occasion of his death. On the occasion of the tercentenary of his death in 2003, several efforts were made to address this situation.

== Westminster Abbey ==
Eddie Smith, former Undermaster and archivist at Westminster School of which Hooke was a member, worked tirelessly on Hooke's behalf to get him a small memorial in Westminster Abbey. The work took years but eventually in 2005 one was unveiled. The inscription reads "Robert Hooke 1703" and is carved from one of the black marble tiles in the floor beneath the Lantern, near the pulpit. This is appropriate as Hooke was responsible for the laying of this floor.

== The Monument ==
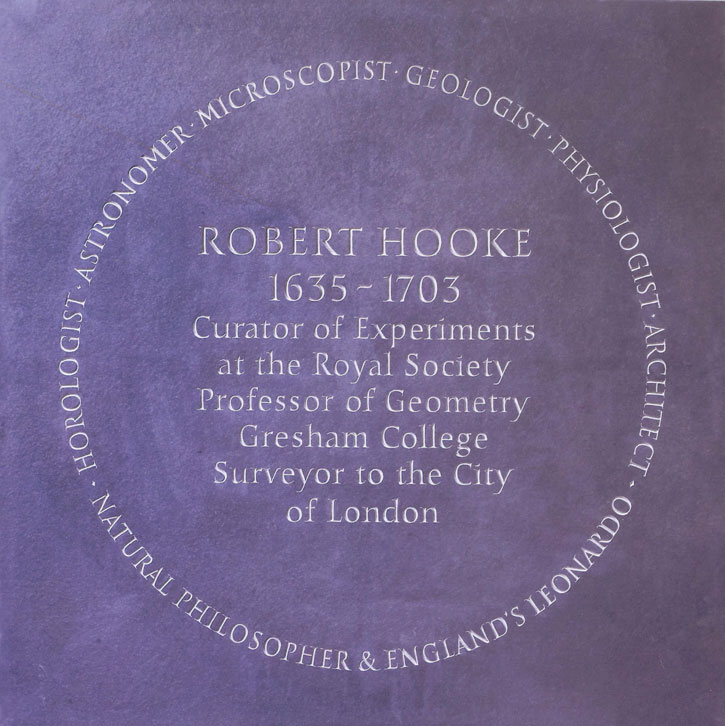
Inscription to Hooke on The Monument, London.

Hooke's name was omitted from the Monument to the Great Fire of London (known generally as just "The Monument"), erected to commemorate the Great Fire of London in 1666, as Sir Christopher Wren has generally been given credit for the design of this monument. The new inscription acknowledges Hooke’s role in the monument's development.

As part of a project to improve the area around the pillar in 2007 it was possible to take a space in the paving for a large (16 square feet (1.5 m^{2})) carved stone. The stone was quarried at Caithness and made its long journey down to London to be carved at the workshop of Richard Kindersley. It can be seen from the entrance to the Monument Underground Station and is now included in sightseeing tours for tourists.

The wording on the memorial was written by Dr. Allan Chapman.

== St Paul's Cathedral ==
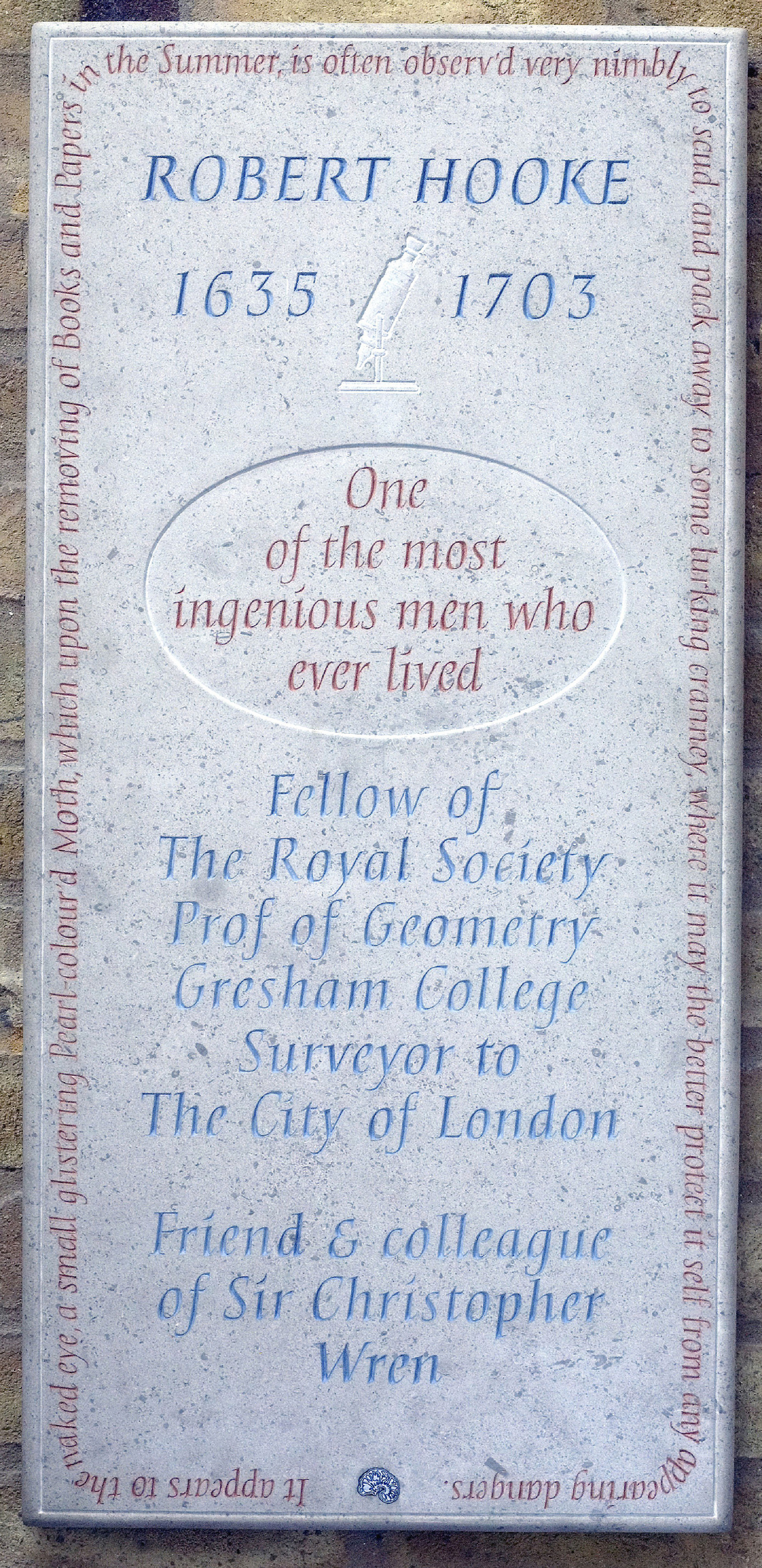
Inscription to Hooke in St. Paul's Cathedral.

Hooke's memorial at St. Paul's Cathedral is on the wall in the crypt of the cathedral, next to the tomb of Sir Christopher Wren. The quotation around the edge is from Micrographia, Hooke's amazing book, published in 1665 and describes a bookworm.

... it appears to the naked eye, a small glittering Pearl-colour'd Moth, which upon the removing of Books and Papers in the Summer, is often observ'd very nimbly to scud, and pack away to some lurking cranney, where it may the better protect itself from any appearing danger ...

— Micrographia, Chapter 52.

At the bottom of the memorial is an engraved metal bookworm in brass and chrome, recessed into the stone surface.

As the crypt is rather a dark place, a pale, ivory-coloured stone was chosen and the carved letters were painted with blue and brownish-red watercolour to make them more easily readable.

The memorial was dedicated by the Dean of St. Paul's after a special Evensong.
