= Robert Hooke =

English polymath (1635–1703)

Robert Hooke FRS
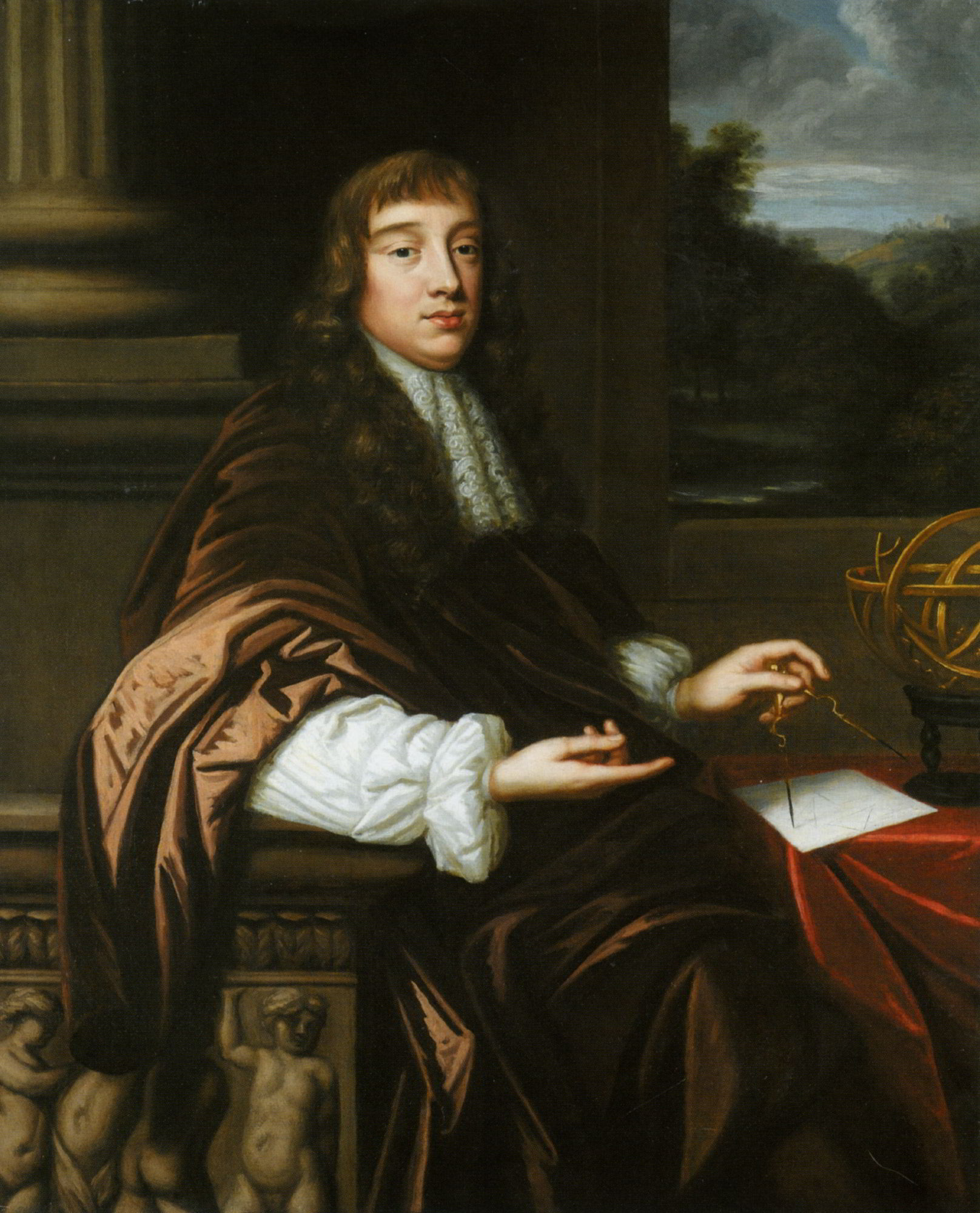
- c. 1680 Portrait of a Mathematician by Mary Beale, of an unknown subject, conjectured to be Hooke or Isaac Barrow
- Born: 18 July 1635; Freshwater, Isle of Wight, England
- Died: 3 March 1703 (aged 67) (Note: These dates are according to the Julian calendar, which was still in use in England at the time. His date of death raises an additional complication: formally the civil year began on 25 March although common practice then as now was to start the year on 1 January. Thus his legal date of death was 3 March 1702 but was 3 March 1703 according to common usage and as shown here: according to the dual dating practice at the time it would be recorded in church records as 3 March 170 2/3. Wikipedia follows the convention adopted by most modern historical writing of retaining the dates according to the Julian calendar but taking the year as starting on 1 January rather than 25 March. (According to the Gregorian calendar that was used in most of Europe, he was born on 28 July 1635 and died on 14 March 1703. The deviation between the calendars grew from ten to eleven days between his birth and his death because the Julian calendar had a 29 February 1700 but the Gregorian calendar did not. For a more detailed explanation, see Calendar (New Style) Act 1750.)); London, England
- Resting place: St Helen's Church, Bishopsgate
- Education: Christ Church, Oxford
- Known for: Balance spring Conical pendulum Constant force escapement Cymatics; Discovery of Gamma Arietis; Discovery of cell Discovery of Great Red Spot; Hooke's law Hooke's joint Hooke's instrument Hooke's wheel Micrographia; Microscopy; Portable camera obscura Reticle; Schlieren; Shadowgraph; Structural coloration Sash window Tin can telephone
- Scientific career
- Fields: Physics and Biology
- Workplaces: University of Oxford
- Academic advisors: John Wilkins, Robert Boyle

Signature
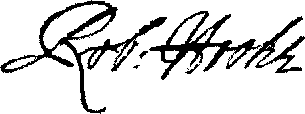

Robert Hooke (/hʊk/; 18 July 1635 – 3 March 1703) was an English polymath who was active as a physicist ('natural philosopher'), astronomer, geologist, meteorologist, and architect. He is credited as one of the first scientists to investigate living things at microscopic scale in 1665, using a compound microscope that he designed. Hooke was an impoverished scientific inquirer in young adulthood who went on to become one of the most important scientists of his time. After the Great Fire of London in 1666, Hooke (as a surveyor and architect) attained wealth and esteem by performing more than half of the property line surveys and assisting with the city's rapid reconstruction. Often vilified by writers in the centuries after his death, his reputation was restored at the end of the twentieth century and he has been called "England's Leonardo [da Vinci]".

Hooke was a Fellow of the Royal Society and from 1662, he was its first Curator of Experiments. From 1665 to 1703, he was also Professor of Geometry at Gresham College. Hooke began his scientific career as an assistant to the physical scientist Robert Boyle. Hooke built the vacuum pumps that were used in Boyle's experiments on gas law and also conducted experiments. In 1664, Hooke identified the rotations of Mars and Jupiter. Hooke's 1665 book Micrographia, in which he coined the term cell, encouraged microscopic investigations. Investigating optics – specifically light refraction – Hooke inferred a wave theory of light. His is the first-recorded hypothesis of the cause of the expansion of matter by heat, of air's composition by small particles in constant motion that thus generate its pressure, and of heat as energy.

In physics, Hooke inferred that gravity obeys an inverse square law and arguably was the first to hypothesise such a relation in planetary motion, a principle Isaac Newton furthered and formalised in Newton's law of universal gravitation. Priority over this insight contributed to the rivalry between Hooke and Newton. In geology and palaeontology, Hooke identified the organic origin and significance of fossils embedded in sedimentary rocks, thus questioning the Biblical view of the Earth's creation. His explanations for the origin of such fossils, some of which he identified as being of extinct species, presaged 19th-century arguments for biological evolution. He also argued that hills and mountains had become elevated by geological processes (rather than having been created exactly as they are today).

== Life and works ==
=== Early life ===
Much of what is known of Hooke's early life comes from an autobiography he commenced in 1696 but never completed; Richard Waller FRS mentions it in his introduction to The Posthumous Works of Robert Hooke, M.D. S.R.S., which was printed in 1705. (Note: "SRS" means "Secretary of the Royal Society". He was also a Fellow of the Royal Society. The "MD" was an honorary degree conferred by Oxford University.) The work of Waller, along with John Ward's Lives of the Gresham Professors, and John Aubrey's Brief Lives form the major near-contemporaneous biographical accounts of his life.

Hooke was born in 1635 in Freshwater, Isle of Wight, to Cecily Gyles and the Anglican priest John Hooke, who was the curate of All Saints' Church, Freshwater. Robert was the youngest, by seven years, of four siblings (two boys and two girls); he was frail and not expected to live. Although his father gave him some instruction in English, (Latin) Grammar, and Divinity, Robert's education was largely neglected. Left to his own devices, he made little mechanical toys; seeing a brass clock dismantled, he built a wooden replica that "would go".

Hooke's father died in October 1648, leaving £40 in his will to Robert (plus another £10 held over from his grandmother). (Note: Aubrey says £100 but the will (Hampshire Record Office 1648B09/1) clearly states £40. Adjusted for retail price inflation, £50 in 1648 equates to about £7,400 today; Gribbin and Gribbin estimate its purchasing power as rather closer to £20,000.) At the age of 13, he took this to London to become an apprentice to the celebrated painter Peter Lely. Hooke also had "some instruction in drawing" from the limner Samuel Cowper but "the smell of the Oil Colours did not agree with his Constitution, increasing his Head-ache to which he was ever too much subject", and he became a pupil at Westminster School, living with its master Richard Busby. Hooke quickly mastered Latin, Greek, and Euclid's Elements; he also learnt to play the organ and began his lifelong study of mechanics. He remained an accomplished draughtsman, as he was later to demonstrate in his drawings that illustrate the work of Robert Boyle and Hooke's own Micrographia.

=== Oxford ===
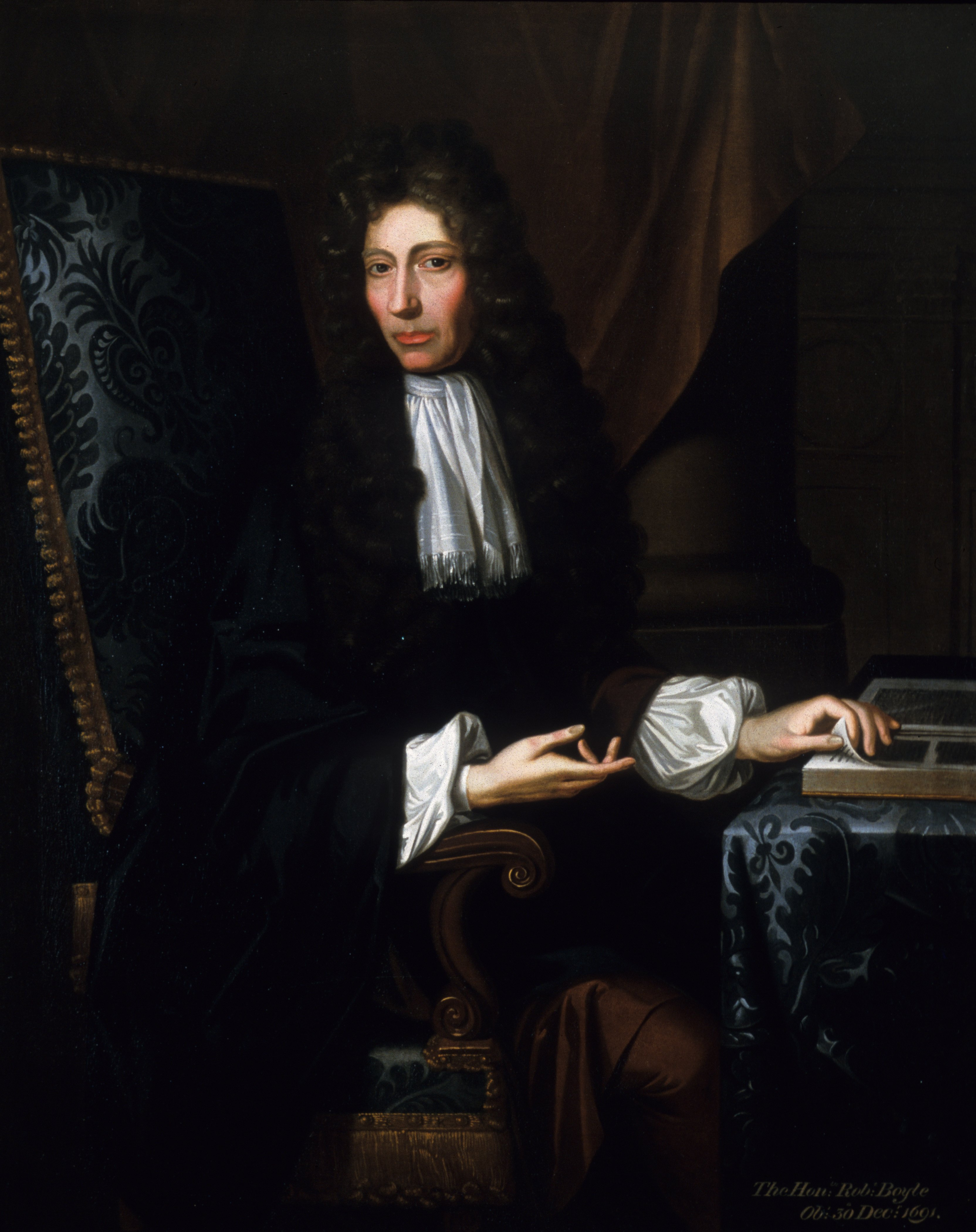
1689 portrait of Robert Boyle by Johann Kerseboom, at Gawthorpe Hall, Lancashire

In 1653, Hooke secured a place at Christ Church, Oxford, receiving free tuition and accommodation as an organist and a chorister, and a basic income as a servitor, (Note: According to Gribbin and Gribbin, the Puritan laws at the time forbade music in churches. The Mr Goodman to whom Hooke was nominally servitor was not an undergraduate at the time so Hooke was not required to perform any services in return.) (despite the fact he did not officially matriculate until 1658.) In 1662, Hooke was awarded a Master of Arts degree.

While a student at Oxford, Hooke was also employed as an assistant to Dr Thomas Willis – a physician, chemist, and member of the Oxford Philosophical Club. (Note: A chance-surviving copy of Willis's pioneering work De anima brutorum, a gift from the author, was chosen by Hooke from Wilkins's library on his death as a memento at John Tillotson's invitation. This book is now in the Wellcome Library.) The Philosophical Club had been founded by John Wilkins, Warden of Wadham College, who led this important group of scientists who went on to form the nucleus of the Royal Society. In 1659, Hooke described to the club some elements of a method of heavier-than-air flight but concluded human muscles were insufficient to the task. Through the club, Hooke met Seth Ward (the University's Savilian Professor of Astronomy) and developed for Ward a mechanism that improved the regularity of pendulum clocks used for astronomical time-keeping. Hooke characterised his Oxford days as the foundation of his lifelong passion for science. The friends he made there, particularly Christopher Wren, were important to him throughout his career. Willis introduced Hooke to Robert Boyle, who the club sought to attract to Oxford.

In 1655, Boyle moved to Oxford and Hooke became nominally his assistant but in practice his co-experimenter. Boyle had been working on gas pressures; the possibility a vacuum might exist despite Aristotle's maxim "Nature abhors a vacuum" had just begun to be considered. Hooke developed an air pump for Boyle's experiments rather than use Ralph Greatorex's pump, which Hooke considered as "too gross to perform any great matter". Hooke's engine enabled the development of the eponymous law that was subsequently attributed to Boyle; (Note: Gribbin and Gribbin say: "it is now widely accepted that it was Hooke who discovered what is now known as 'Boyle's Law' of gasses". Boyle published the law in his 1662 book but did not claim it as his own.) Hooke had a particularly keen eye and was an adept mathematician, neither of which applied to Boyle. Hooke taught Boyle Euclid's Elements and Descartes's Principles of Philosophy; it also caused them to recognise fire as a chemical reaction and not, as Aristotle taught, a fundamental element of nature.

=== Royal Society ===
According to Henry Robinson, Librarian of The Royal Society in 1935:

Without his weekly experiments and prolific work the Society could scarcely have survived, or, at least, would have developed in a quite different way. It is scarcely an exaggeration to say that he was, historically, the creator of the Royal Society.

The Royal Society for the Improvement of Natural Knowledge by Experiment (Note: Subsequently renamed "The Royal Society of London for Promoting Natural Knowledge") was founded in 1660 and given its Royal Charter in July 1662. On 5 November 1661, Robert Moray proposed the appointment of a curator to furnish the society with experiments and this was unanimously passed and Hooke was named on Boyle's recommendation. The society did not have a reliable income to fully fund the post of 'curator of experiments' but in 1664, John Cutler settled an annual gratuity of £50 on the society to found a "Mechanick" lectureship at Gresham College on the understanding the society would appoint Hooke to this task. On 27 June 1664, Hooke was confirmed to the office and on 11 January 1665, he was named Curator by Office for life with an annual salary of £80, (Note: About £15,100 today, indexed by retail prices rather than earnings.) consisting of £30 from the society and Cutler's £50 annuity. (Note: Cutler proved unreliable and Hooke had to sue him in following years to secure payment. Following Cutler's death, Hooke enlisted the aid of friends of the Cutler family, including Master of The Haberdashers Company Richard Levett, with whom Hooke was separately involved in a building commission, to help recover the funds Cutler owed.)

In June 1663, Hooke was elected a Fellow of the Royal Society (FRS). On 20 March 1665, he was also appointed Gresham Professor of Geometry. On 13 September 1667, Hooke became acting secretary of the society and on 19 December 1677, he was appointed its joint secretary.

=== Personality, relationships, health, and death ===
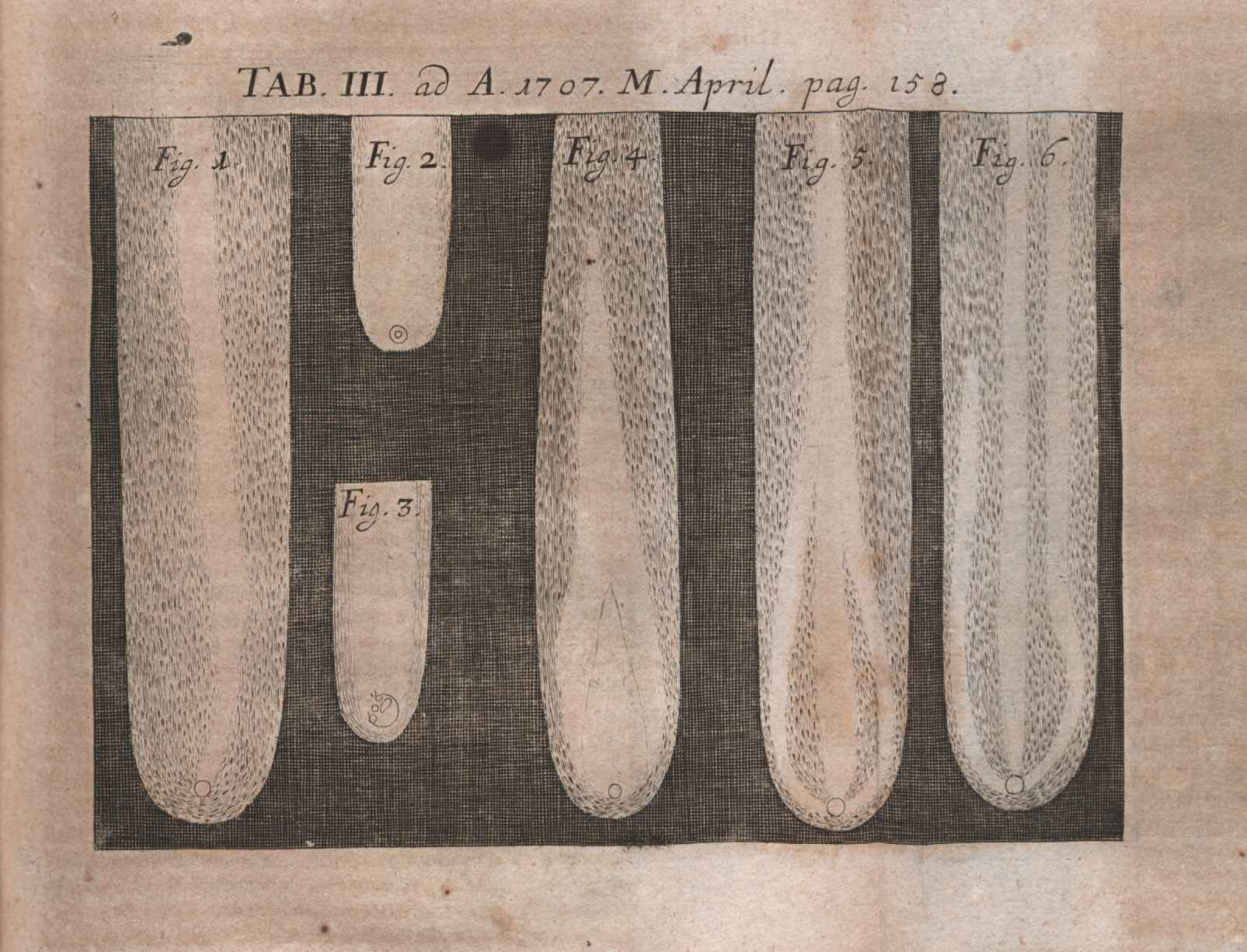
Illustration from The posthumous works of Robert Hooke... published in Acta Eruditorum, 1707

Although John Aubrey described Hooke as a person of "great virtue and goodness". much has been written about the unpleasant side of Hooke's personality. According to his first biographer Richard Waller, Hooke was "in person, but despicable", and "melancholy, mistrustful, and jealous". Waller's comments influenced other writers for more than 200 years such that many books and articles – especially biographies of Isaac Newton – portray Hooke as a disgruntled, selfish, anti-social curmudgeon. For example, Arthur Berry said Hooke "claimed credit for most of the scientific discoveries of the time". Sullivan wrote he was "positively unscrupulous" and had an "uneasy apprehensive vanity" in dealings with Newton. Manuel described Hooke as "cantankerous, envious, vengeful". According to More, Hooke had both a "cynical temperament" and a "caustic tongue". Andrade was more sympathetic but still described Hooke as "difficult", "suspicious" and "irritable". In October 1675, the Council of the Royal Society considered a motion to expel Hooke because of an attack he made on Christiaan Huygens over scientific priority in watch design but it did not pass. According to Hooke's biographer Ellen Drake:

if one studies the intellectual milieu of the time, the controversies and rivalries of the type in which he was involved seem almost to be the rule rather than the exception. And Hooke's reaction to such controversy involving his own discoveries and inventions seems mild in comparison to the behaviour of some of his contemporaries".

The publication of Hooke's diary in 1935 revealed previously unknown details about his social and familial relationships. His biographer Margaret 'Espinasse said: "the picture which is usually painted of Hooke as a morose ... recluse is completely false". He interacted with noted artisans such as clock-maker Thomas Tompion and instrument-maker Christopher Cocks (Cox). Hooke often met Christopher Wren, with whom he shared many interests, and had a lasting friendship with John Aubrey. His diaries also make frequent reference to meetings at coffeehouses and taverns, as well as to dinners with Robert Boyle. On many occasions, Hooke took tea with his lab assistant Harry Hunt. Although he largely lived alone – apart from the servants who ran his home – his niece Grace Hooke and his cousin Tom Giles lived with him for some years as children.

Hooke never married. According to his diary, Hooke had a sexual relationship with his niece Grace, after she had turned 16. Grace had been in his custody since the age of 10. He also had sexual relations with several maids and housekeepers. Hooke's biographer Stephen Inwood considers Grace to have been the love of his life, and he was devastated when she died in 1687. Inwood also mentions "The age difference between him and Grace was commonplace and would not have upset his contemporaries as it does us". The incestuous relationship would nevertheless have been frowned upon and tried by an ecclesiastical court had it been discovered: it was not, however, a capital felony after 1660. (Note: Inwood considers it unlikely Hooke was father to a daughter by Grace, and it is more likely the father was Sir Robert Holmes, Governor of the Isle of Wight. Jardine concurs.)

Since childhood, Hooke suffered from migraine, tinnitus, dizziness, and bouts of insomnia; he also had a spinal deformity that was consistent with a diagnosis of Scheuermann's kyphosis, giving him in middle and later years a "thin and crooked body, over-large head and protruding eyes". Approaching these in a scientific spirit, he experimented with self-medication, diligently recording symptoms, substances, and effects in his diary. He regularly used sal ammoniac, emetics, laxatives, and opium, which appear to have had an increasing effect on his physical and mental health over time.

Hooke died in London on 3 March 1703, having been blind and bedridden during the last year of his life. A chest containing £8,000 in money and gold was found in his room at Gresham College. (Note: About £1,700,000 today.) His library contained over 3,000 books in Latin, French, Italian, and English. Although he had talked of leaving a generous bequest to the Royal Society, which would have given his name to a library, laboratory, and lectures, no will was found and the money passed to a cousin named Elizabeth Stephens. Hooke was buried at St Helen's Church, Bishopsgate, in the City of London but the precise location of his grave is unknown.

== Science ==
Hooke's role at the Royal Society was to demonstrate experiments from his own methods or at the suggestion of members. Among his earliest demonstrations were discussions of the nature of air and the implosion of glass bubbles that had been sealed with enclosed hot air. He also demonstrated that a dog could be kept alive with its thorax opened, provided air was pumped in and out of its lungs. (Note: Hooke was distressed by the experience of vivisection. In a letter to Boyle, he wrote: "I shall hardly be induced to make further trials of this kind, because of the torture of the creature".) He noted the difference between venous blood and arterial blood, and thus demonstrated that the Pabulum vitae ("food of life") (Note: "Here then we observe a striking similarity between combustion and animal respiration. The ancients seem to have had a more accurate idea of respiration than most of the philosophers who followed them. They supposed that the air contained a principle proper for the support and nourishment of life, which they called pabulum vitae" – Thomas Garnett, Popular lectures on zoonomia, or the laws of animal life, in health and disease (1804). We now know this to be oxygen.) and flammae [flames] were the same thing. There were also experiments on gravity, the falling of objects, the weighing of bodies, the measurement of barometric pressure at different heights, and the movement of pendulums up to 200 ft (61 m) long. His biographer Margaret 'Espinasse described him as England's first meteorologist, in her description of his essay Method for making a history of the weather. (Hooke specifies that a thermometer, a hygrometer, a wind gauge, and a record sheet be used for proper weather records. (Note: Hooke described a wind speed gauge in Method, but he did not invent it. See Anemometer § Plate anemometers.))

=== Astronomy ===
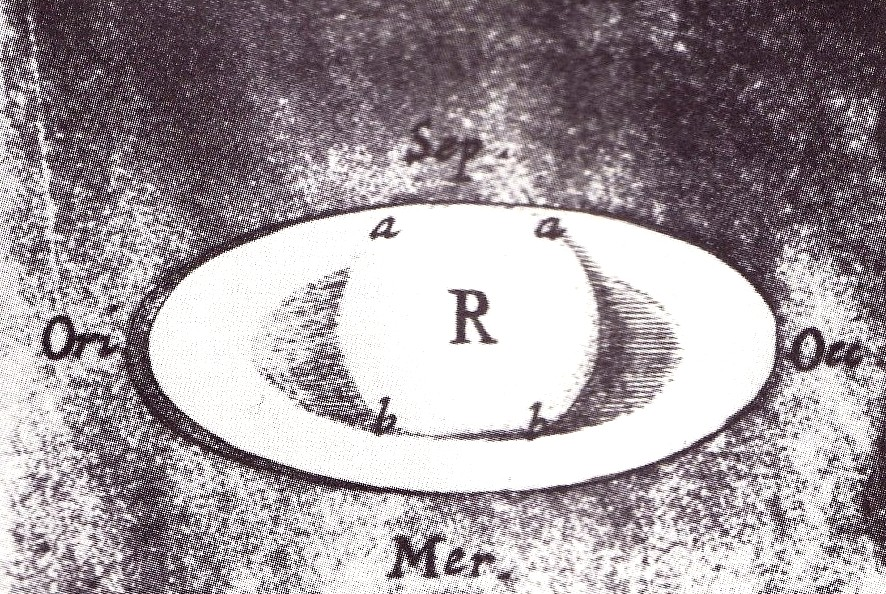
Hooke noted the shadows (a and b) cast by both the globe and the rings on each other in this drawing of Saturn.

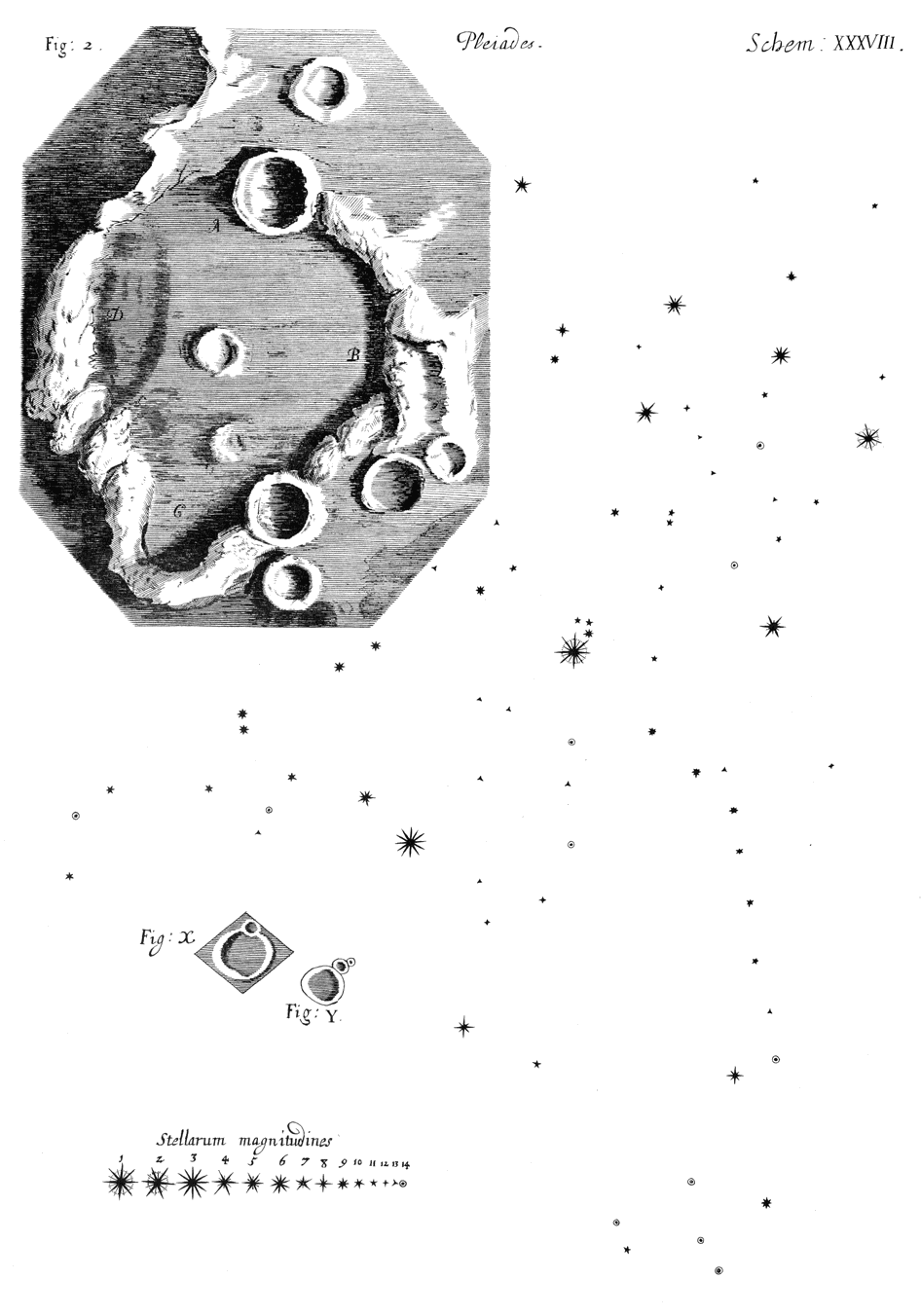
Drawings of the Moon and the Pleiades from Hooke's Micrographia

In May 1664, using a 12 ft (3.7 m) refracting telescope, Hooke observed the Great Red Spot of Jupiter for two hours as it moved across the planet's face. In March 1665, he published his findings and from them, the Italian astronomer Giovanni Cassini calculated the rotation period of Jupiter to be nine hours and fifty-five minutes.

One of the most-challenging problems Hooke investigated was the measurement of the distance from Earth to a star other than the Sun. Hooke selected the star Gamma Draconis and chose the method of parallax determination. In 1669, after several months of observing, Hooke believed the desired result had been achieved. It is now known his equipment was far too imprecise to obtain an accurate measurement.

Hooke's Micrographia contains illustrations of the Pleiades star cluster and lunar craters. He conducted experiments to investigate the formation of these craters and concluded their existence meant the Moon must have its own gravity, a radical departure from the contemporaneous Aristotelian celestial model. He also was an early observer of the rings of Saturn, and discovered one of the first-observed double stars, Gamma Arietis (a visual binary), in 1664.

To achieve these discoveries, Hooke needed better instruments than those that were available at the time. Accordingly, he invented three new mechanisms: the Hooke joint, a sophisticated universal joint that allowed his instruments to smoothly follow the apparent motion of the observed body; the first clockwork drive to automate the process; and a micrometer screw that allowed him to achieve a precision of ten seconds of arc. Hooke was dissatisfied with refracting telescopes so he built the first practical Gregorian telescope that used a silvered glass mirror. (Note: Between Gregory's initial effort and Hooke's improvement, Isaac Newton had built a reflecting telescope – but because its mirror was made from polished steel, it tarnished and rapidly became useless.)

=== Mechanics ===
In 1660, Hooke discovered the law of elasticity that bears his name and describes the linear variation of tension with extension in an elastic spring. Hooke first described this discovery in an anagram "ceiiinosssttuv", whose solution he published in 1678 as Ut tensio, sic vis ("As the extension, so the force"). His work on elasticity culminated in his development of the balance spring or hairspring, which for the first time enabled a portable timepiece – a watch – to keep time with reasonable accuracy. A bitter dispute between Hooke and Christiaan Huygens on the priority of this invention was to continue for centuries after the death of both but a note dated 23 June 1670 in the journals of the Royal Society, describing a demonstration of a balance-controlled watch before the Royal Society, may support Hooke's claim to priority for the idea. Nevertheless, it is Huygens who is credited with building the first watch to use a balance spring.

Hooke's announcement of his law of elasticity using an anagram was a method scientists, such as Hooke, Huygens, and Galileo, sometimes used to establish priority for a discovery without revealing details. Hooke used mechanical analogues to understand fundamental processes such as the motion of a spherical pendulum and of a ball in a hollow cone, to demonstrate central force due to gravity, and a hanging chain net with point loads to provide the optimum shape for a dome with heavy cross on top.

Despite continuing reports to the contrary, Hooke did not influence Thomas Newcomen's invention of the steam engine; this myth, which originated in an article in the third edition of Encyclopædia Britannica, has been found to be mistaken.

=== Gravitation ===
While many of Hooke's contemporaries, such as Isaac Newton, believed in aether as a medium for transmitting attraction and repulsion between separated celestial bodies, Hooke argued for an attracting principle of gravitation in Micrographia (1665). In a communication to the Royal Society in 1666, he wrote:

I will explain a system of the world very different from any yet received. It is founded on the following positions. 1. That all the heavenly bodies have not only a gravitation of their parts to their own proper centre, but that they also mutually attract each other within their spheres of action. 2. That all bodies having a simple motion, will continue to move in a straight line, unless continually deflected from it by some extraneous force, causing them to describe a circle, an ellipse, or some other curve. 3. That this attraction is so much the greater as the bodies are nearer. As to the proportion in which those forces diminish by an increase of distance, I own I have not discovered it. ...

Hooke's 1674 Gresham lecture, An Attempt to Prove the Motion of the Earth by Observations (published 1679), said gravitation applies to "all celestial bodies" and restated these three propositions.

Hooke's statements up to 1674 make no mention, however, that an inverse square law applies or might apply to these attractions. His model of gravitation was also not yet universal, though it approached universality more closely than previous hypotheses. Hooke did not provide accompanying evidence or mathematical demonstration; he stated in 1674: "Now what these several degrees [of gravitational attraction] are I have not yet experimentally verified", indicating he did not yet know what law the gravitation might follow; and about his whole proposal, he said: "This I only hint at present ... having my self many other things in hand which I would first compleat, and therefore cannot so well attend it" (i.e. "prosecuting this Inquiry").

In November 1679, Hooke initiated a notable exchange of letters with Newton that was published in 1960. Hooke's ostensible purpose was to tell Newton he (Hooke) had been appointed to manage the Royal Society's correspondence; Hooke therefore wanted to hear from members about their research or their views about the research of others. Hooke asked Newton's opinions about various matters. Among other items, Hooke mentioned "compounding the celestial motions of the planets of a direct motion by the tangent and an attractive motion towards the central body"; his "hypothesis of the lawes or causes of springinesse"; a new hypothesis from Paris about planetary motions, which he described at length; efforts to carry out or improve national surveys; and the difference of latitude between London and Cambridge.

Newton's reply offered "a fansy of my own" about a terrestrial experiment rather than a proposal about celestial motions that might detect the Earth's motion; the experiment would use a body suspended in air and then dropped. Hooke wanted to discern how Newton thought the falling body could experimentally reveal the Earth's motion by its direction of deviation from the vertical but Hooke went on hypothetically to consider how its motion could continue if the solid Earth had not been in the way, on a spiral path to the centre. Hooke disagreed with Newton's idea of the body's continuing motion. A further short correspondence developed; towards the end of it, writing on 6 January 1680 to Newton, Hooke communicated his "supposition ... that the Attraction always is in a duplicate proportion to the Distance from the Center Reciprocall, and Consequently that the Velocity will be in a subduplicate proportion to the Attraction and Consequently as Kepler Supposes Reciprocall to the Distance". (Hooke's inference about the velocity is incorrect.)

In 1686, when the first book of Newton's Principia was presented to the Royal Society, Hooke said he had given Newton the "notion" of "the rule of the decrease of Gravity, being reciprocally as the squares of the distances from the Center". At the same time, according to Edmond Halley's contemporaneous report, Hooke agreed "the Demonstration of the Curves generated thereby" was wholly Newton's.

According to a 2002 assessment of the early history of the inverse square law: "by the late 1660s, the assumption of an 'inverse proportion between gravity and the square of distance' was rather common and had been advanced by a number of different people for different reasons". In the 1660s, Newton had shown for planetary motion under a circular assumption, force in the radial direction had an inverse-square relation with distance from the centre. Newton, who in May 1686 was presented with Hooke's claim to priority on the inverse square law, denied he was to be credited as author of the idea, giving reasons including the citation of prior work by others. Newton also said that, even if he had first heard of the inverse square proportion from Hooke (which Newton said he had not), he would still have some rights to it because of his mathematical developments and demonstrations. These, he said, enabled observations to be relied upon as evidence of its accuracy while according to Newton, Hooke, without mathematical demonstrations and evidence in favour of the supposition, could only guess it was approximately valid "at great distances from the centre".

Newton accepted and acknowledged, in all editions of his Principia, that Hooke and others had separately appreciated the inverse square law in the solar system. Newton acknowledged Wren, Hooke, and Halley in this connection in his "Scholium to Proposition 4" in Book 1. In a letter to Halley, Newton also acknowledged his correspondence with Hooke in 1679–1680 had reawakened his dormant interest in astronomical matters but that did not mean, according to Newton, Hooke had told Newton anything new or original. Newton wrote:

Yet am I not beholden to him for any light into that business ... but only for the diversion he gave me from my other studies to think on these things & for his dogmaticalness in writing as if he had found the motion in the Ellipsis, which inclined me to try it.

Whilst Newton was primarily a pioneer in mathematical analysis and its applications, and optical experimentation, Hooke was a creative experimenter of such great range who left some of his ideas, such as those about gravitation, undeveloped. In 1759, decades after the deaths of both Newton and Hooke, Alexis Clairaut, mathematical astronomer eminent in his own right in the field of gravitational studies, reviewed Hooke's published work on gravitation. According to Stephen Peter Rigaud, Clairaut wrote: "The example of Hooke and that of Kepler [serves] to show what a distance there is between a truth that is glimpsed and a truth that is demonstrated". (Note: Original French: "L'exemple de Hook & celui de Kepler [serve] à faire voir quelle distance il y a entre une vérité entrevue & une vérité démontrée.") I. Bernard Cohen said: "Hooke's claim to the inverse-square law has masked Newton's far more fundamental debt to him, the analysis of curvilinear orbital motion. In asking for too much credit, Hooke effectively denied to himself the credit due him for a seminal idea".

=== Horology ===
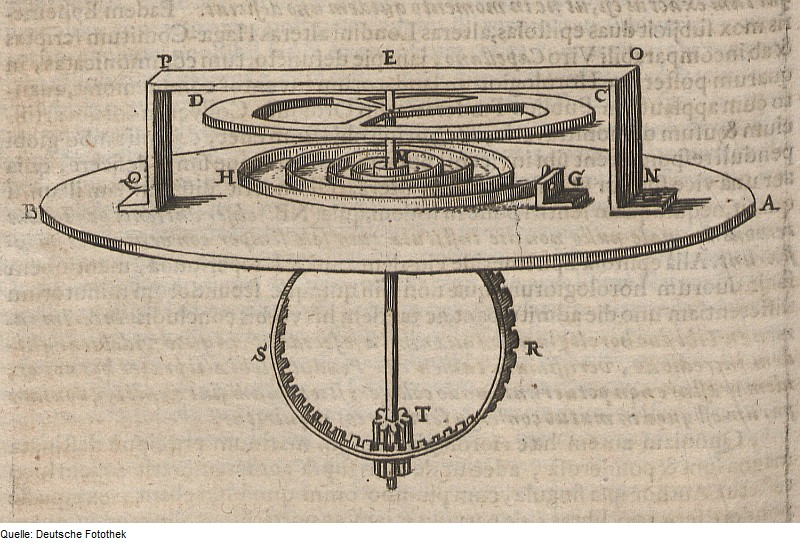
Drawing by Christiaan Huygens of one of his first balance springs, which is attached to a balance wheel

Hooke made important contributions to the science of timekeeping and was intimately involved in the advances of his time; these included refinement of the pendulum as a better regulator for clocks, increased precision of clock mechanisms and the use of the balance spring to improve the timekeeping of watches.

Galileo had observed the regularity of a pendulum and Huygens first incorporated it in a clock; in 1668, Hooke demonstrated his new device to keep a pendulum swinging regularly in unsteady conditions. His invention of a tooth-cutting machine enabled a substantial improvement in the accuracy and precision of timepieces. Waller reported the invention was, by Hooke's death, in constant use among clock makers.

Hooke announced he conceived a way to build a marine chronometer to determine longitude. (Note: As Gemma Frisius had already observed, each four minutes of time difference is equivalent to one degree of longitude difference. The latitude is easily determined by sextant.) and with the help of Boyle and others, he attempted to patent it. In the process, Hooke demonstrated a pocket-watch of his own devising that was fitted with a coil spring attached to the arbour of the balance. Hooke's refusal to accept an escape clause in the proposed exclusive contract for the use of this idea resulted in its abandonment. (Note: His exclusivity would lapse as soon as another made any improvement to it which, he argued, would be easy to do.)

Hooke developed the principle of the balance spring independently of Huygens and at least five years beforehand. Huygens published his own work in Journal de Scavans in February 1675 and built the first functioning watch to use a balance spring.

=== Microscopy ===
In 1663 and 1664, Hooke made his microscopic, and some astronomic, observations, which he collated in Micrographia in 1665. His book, which describes observations with microscopes and telescopes, as well as original work in biology, contains the earliest-recorded observation of a microorganism, the microfungus Mucor. Hooke coined the term "cell", suggesting a resemblance between plant structures and honeycomb cells.The hand-crafted, leather-and-gold-tooled microscope he designed and used to make the observations for Micrographia, which Christopher Cock made for him in London, is on display at the National Museum of Health and Medicine in Maryland. Hooke's work developed from that of Henry Power, who published his microscopy work in Experimental Philosophy (1663); in turn, the Dutch scientist Antonie van Leeuwenhoek went on to develop increased magnification and so reveal protozoa, blood cells, and spermatozoa.

Micrographia also contains Hooke's, or perhaps Boyle's and Hooke's, ideas on combustion. Hooke's experiments led him to conclude combustion involves a component of air, a statement with which modern scientists would agree but that was not understood widely, if at all, in the seventeenth century. He also concluded respiration and combustion involve a specific and limited component of air. According to Partington, if "Hooke had continued his experiments on combustion, it is probable that he would have discovered oxygen".

Samuel Pepys wrote of the book in his diary on 21 January 16 64/65: "Before I went to bed I sat up till two o'clock in my chamber reading of Mr. Hooke's Microscopicall Observations, the most ingenious book that ever I read in my life".

Hooke's microscopy
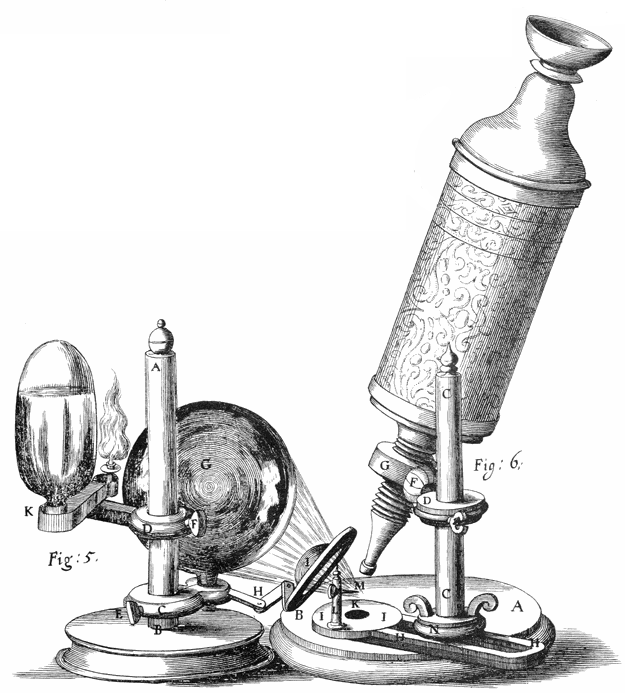
Hooke's microscope, from an engraving in Micrographia

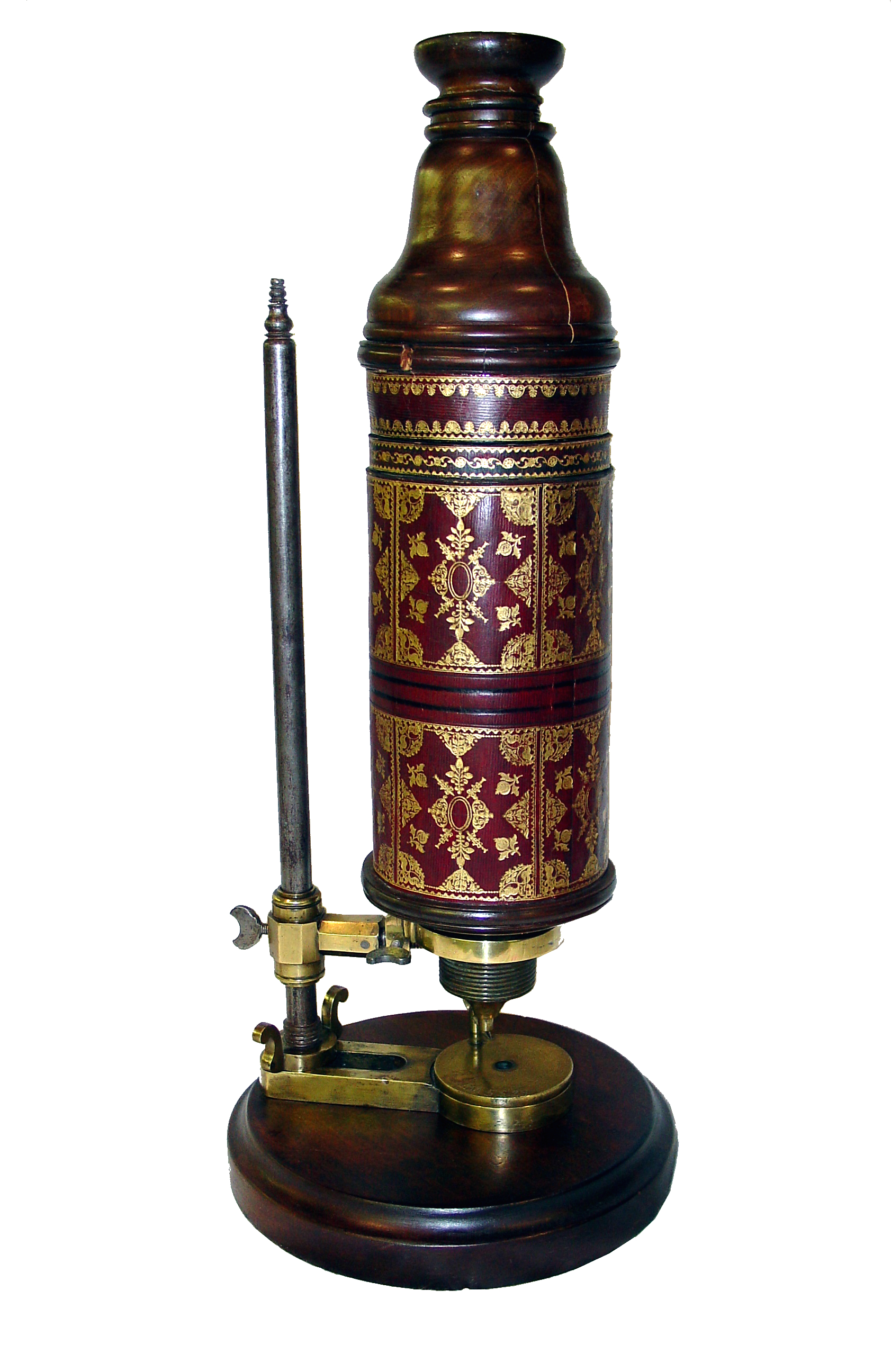
Hooke's microscope

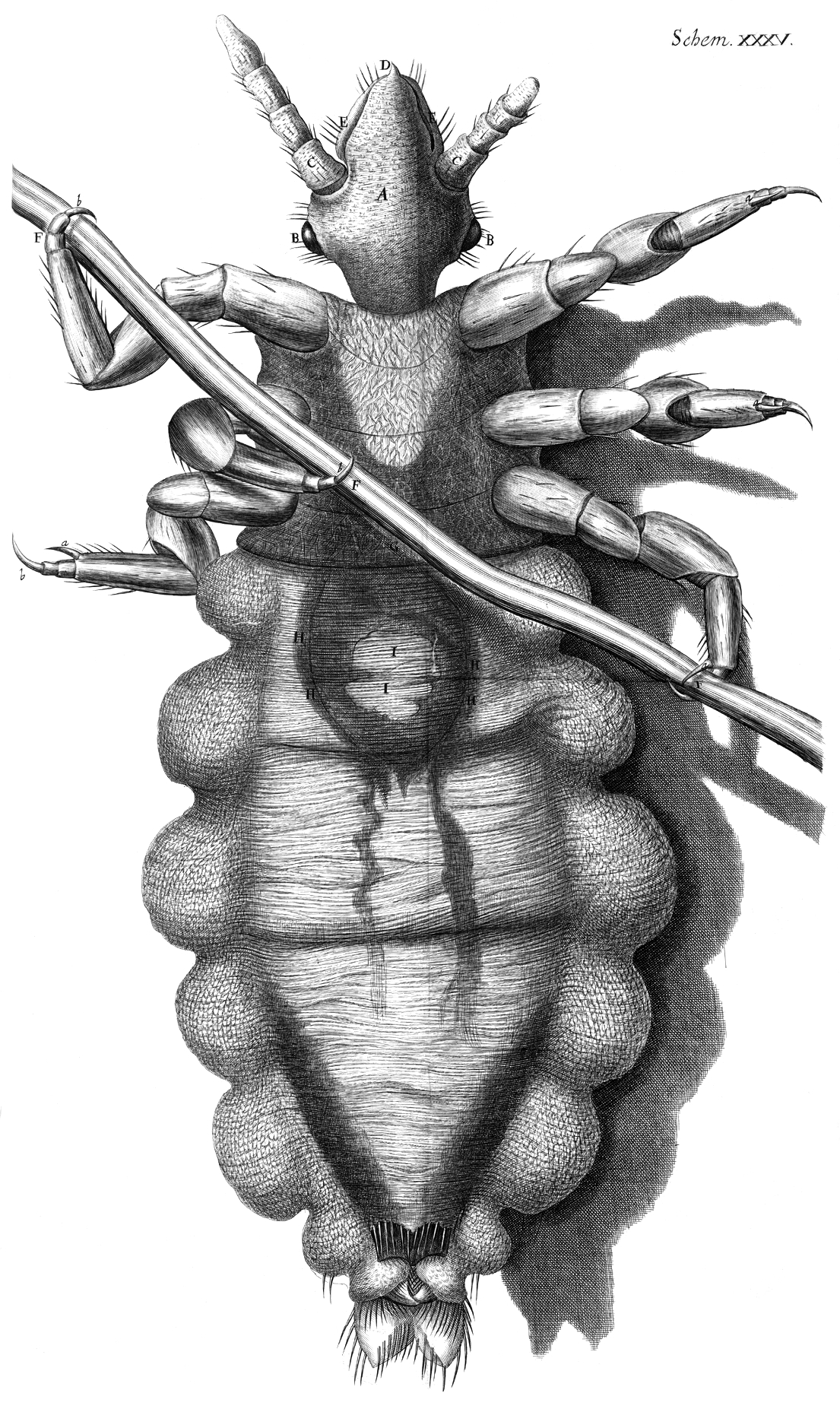
Engraving of a louse from Hooke's Micrographia

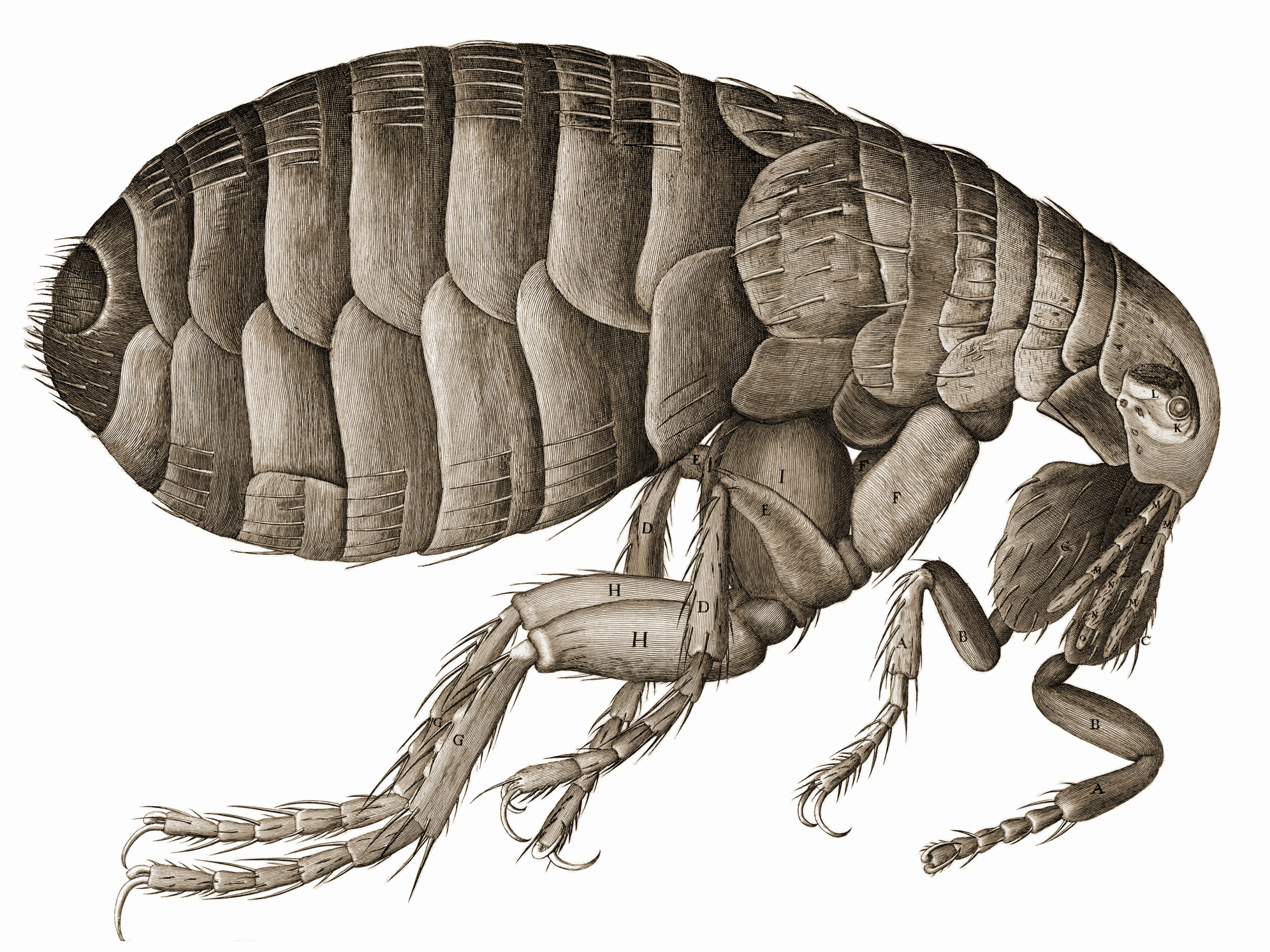
Hooke's drawing of a flea

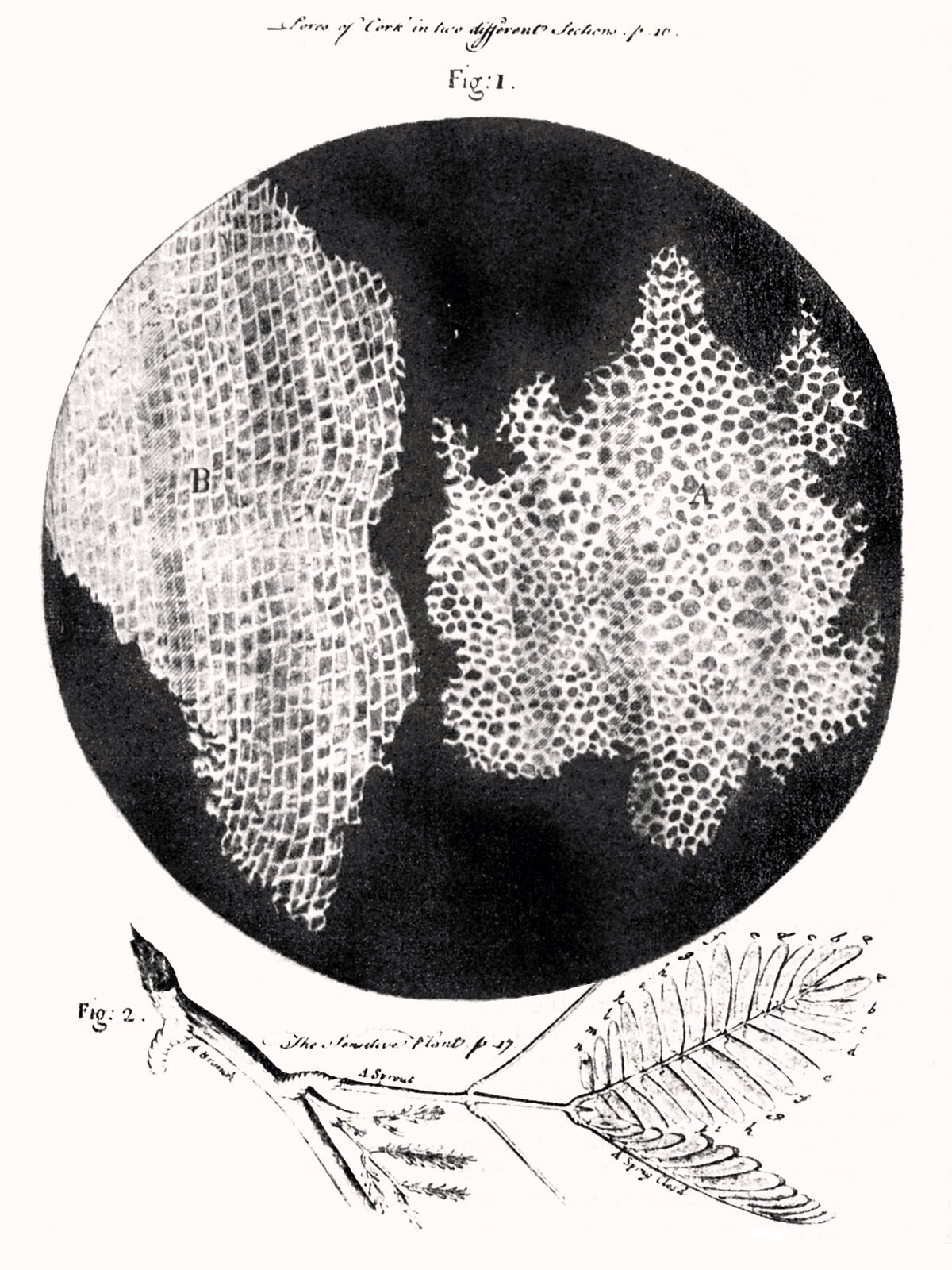
Cell structure of cork by Hooke

=== Palaeontology and geology ===
One of the observations in Micrographia is of fossil wood, the microscopic structure of which Hooke compared to that of ordinary wood. This led him to conclude that fossilised objects like petrified wood and fossil shells such as ammonites were the remains of living things that had been soaked in mineral-laden petrifying water. He believed that such fossils provided reliable clues about the history of life on Earth and, despite the objections of contemporary naturalists like John Ray – who found the concept of extinction theologically unacceptable – that in some cases they might represent species that had become extinct through some geological disaster. In a series of lectures in 1668, Hooke proposed the then-heretical idea the Earth's surface had been formed by volcanoes and earthquakes, and that the latter were responsible for shell fossils being found far above sea level.

In 1835, Charles Lyell, the Scottish geologist and associate of Charles Darwin, wrote of Hooke in Principles of Geology: "His treatise ... is the most philosophical production of that age, in regard to the causes of former changes in the organic and inorganic kingdoms of nature".

=== Memory ===
Hooke's scientific model of human memory was one of the first of its kind. In a 1682 lecture to the Royal Society, Hooke proposed a mechanical analogue model of human memory that bore little resemblance to the mainly philosophical models of earlier writers. This model addressed the components of encoding, memory capacity, repetition, retrieval, and forgetting – some with surprisingly modern accuracy. According to psychology professor Douglas Hintzman, Hooke's model's most-interesting points are that it allows for attention and other top-down influences on encoding; it uses resonance to implement parallel, cue-dependent retrieval; it explains memory for recency; it offers a single-system account of repetition and priming; and the power law of forgetting can be derived from the model's assumption in a straightforward way.

=== Other ===
On 8 July 1680, Hooke observed the nodal patterns associated with the modes of vibration of glass plates. He ran a bow along the edge of a flour-covered glass plate and saw the nodal patterns emerge. In acoustics, in 1681, Hooke showed the Royal Society that musical tones can be generated using spinning brass cogs cut with teeth in particular proportions.

== Architecture ==
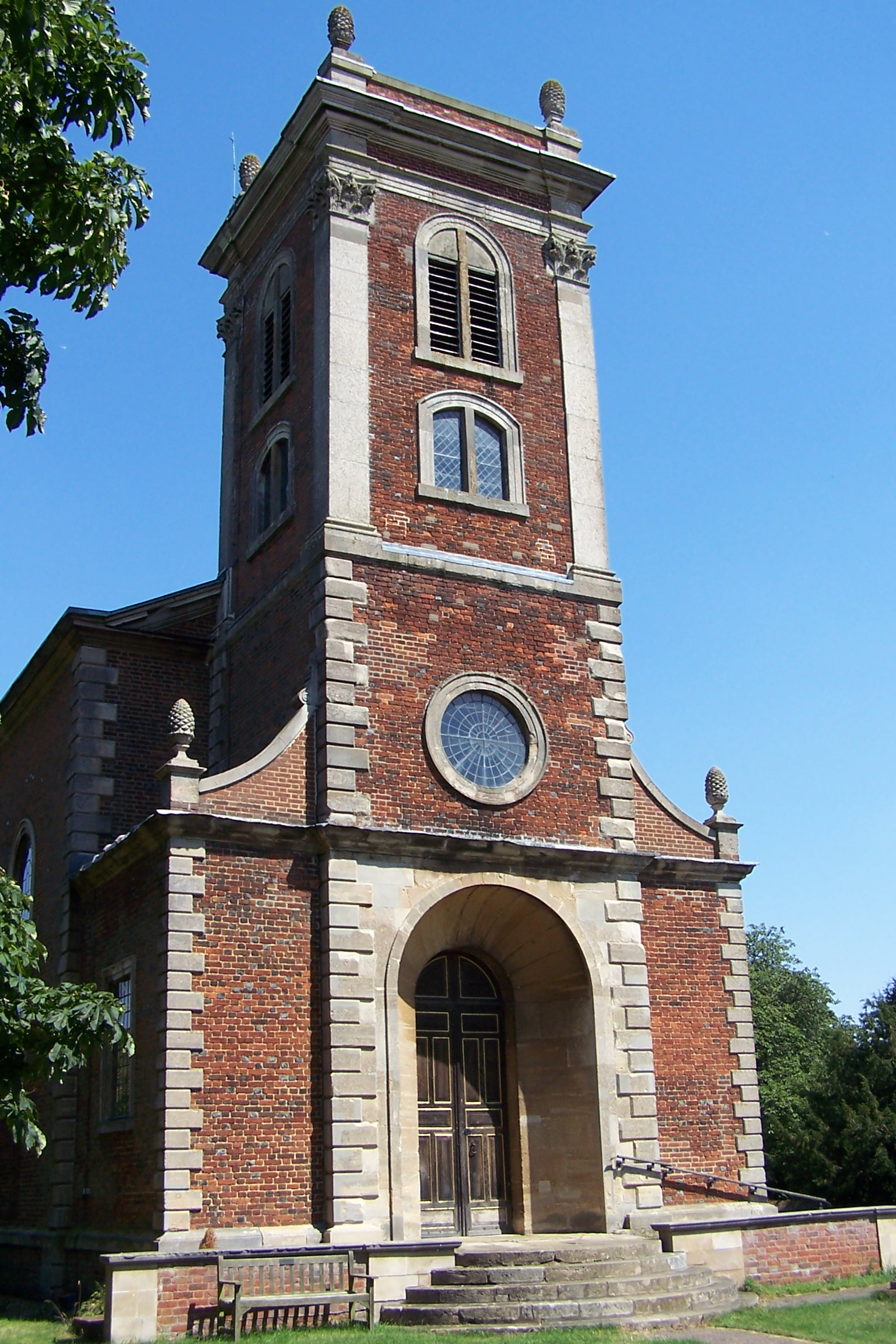
Church of St Mary Magdalene at Willen, Milton Keynes, designed by Hooke

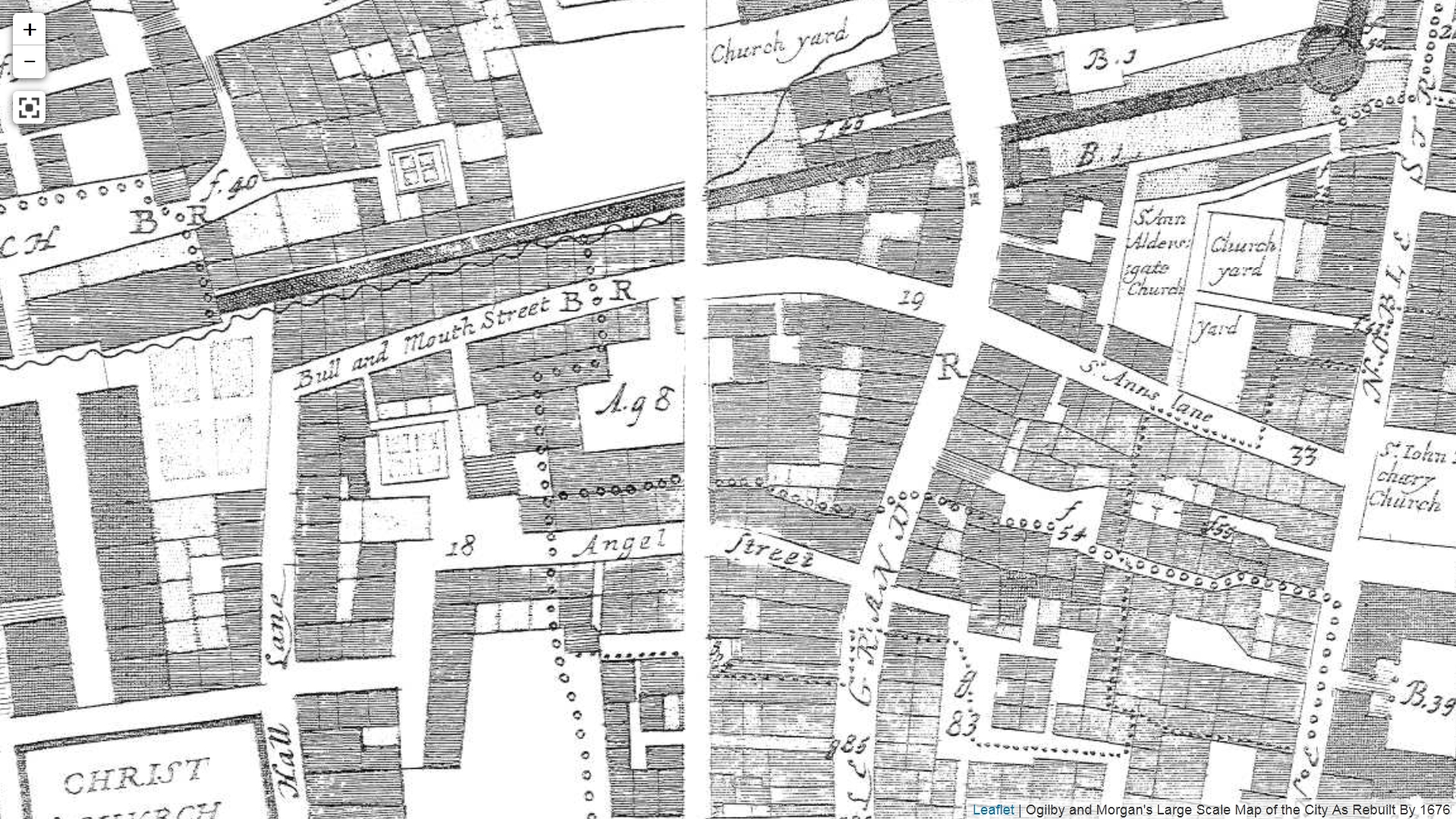
Detail from Ogilby and Morgan's "most accurate Survey of the City of London and Libertyes therof"

Robert Hooke was Surveyor to the City of London and chief assistant to Christopher Wren, in which capacities he helped Wren rebuild London after the Great Fire of 1666. Hooke designed the Monument to the Great Fire of London (1672), (Note: The plaque on the structure that attributes it to Wren is not correct.) Montagu House in Bloomsbury (1674) and Bethlem Royal Hospital (1674), which became known as "Bedlam". Other buildings Hooke designed include the Royal College of Physicians (1679); Aske's Hospital (1679), Ragley Hall, Warwickshire (1680); the Church of St Mary Magdalene at Willen, Buckinghamshire (1680) and Ramsbury Manor, Wiltshire (1681). He worked on many of the London churches that were rebuilt after the fire; Hooke was generally subcontracted by Wren; from 1671 to 1696, Wren's office paid Hooke £2,820 in fees, (Note: About £582,000 today.) more than he ever earned from his Royal Society and Cutler Lectureship posts.

Wren and Hooke were both keen astronomers. The Monument to the Great Fire of London was designed to serve a scientific function as a zenith telescope for astronomical observation, though traffic vibration made it unusable for this purpose. The legacy of this can be observed in the construction of the spiral staircase, which has no central column, and in the observation chamber, which remains in place below ground level. He also collaborated with Wren on the design of St Paul's Cathedral; Hooke determined the ideal shape of an arch is an inverted catenary and thence that a circular series of such arches makes an ideal shape for the cathedral's dome.

In the reconstruction after the Great Fire, Hooke proposed redesigning London's streets on a grid pattern with wide boulevards and arteries, for which Wren and others also submitted proposals. The king decided both the prospective cost of building and compensation, and the need to quickly restore trade and population meant the city would be rebuilt on the original property lines. Hooke was given the task of surveying the ruins to identify foundations, street edges, and property boundaries. He was closely involved with the drafting of an Act of Common Council (April 1667), which set out the process by which the original foundations would be formally recognised and certificated. According to Lisa Jardine: "in the four weeks from the 4th of October, [Hooke] helped map the fire-damaged area, began compiling a Land Information System for London, and drew up building regulations for an Act of Parliament to govern the rebuilding". Stephen Inwood said: "the surveyors' reports, which were generally written by Hooke, show an admirable ability to get to the nub of intricate neighbourly squabbles, and to produce a crisp and judicious recommendation from a tangle of claims and counter-claims".

Hooke also had to measure and certify land that would be compulsorily purchased for the planned road widening so compensation could be paid. In 1670, he was appointed Surveyor of the Royal Works. Hooke's precise and detailed surveys enabled the production in 1677 of Ogilby and Morgan's large-scale map of London, the first-known to be of a specific scale (1:1200).

== Likenesses ==
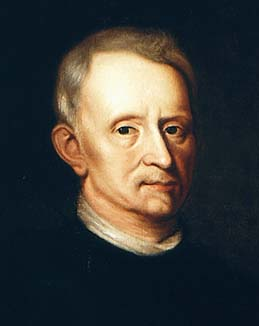
Portrait conjectured to be Hooke, but almost certainly Jan Baptist van Helmont

No authenticated portrait of Robert Hooke exists, a situation that has sometimes been attributed to the heated conflicts between Hooke and Isaac Newton, although Hooke's biographer Allan Chapman rejects as a myth claims Newton or his acolytes deliberately destroyed Hooke's portrait. German antiquarian and scholar Zacharias Conrad von Uffenbach visited the Royal Society in 1710 and his account of his visit mentions him being shown portraits of "Boyle and Hoock", which were said to be good likenesses but, while Boyle's portrait survives, Hooke's has been lost. In Hooke's time, the Royal Society met at Gresham College, but within a few months of Hooke's death Newton became the society's president, and plans for a new meeting place were made. When the Royal Society moved to new premises in 1710, Hooke's was the only portrait that went missing and remains so. According to Hooke's diary, he sat for a portrait by renowned artist Mary Beale, so it is possible such a portrait did at some time exist. Conversely, Chapman draws attention to the fact that Waller's extensively illustrated work, Posthumous works of Robert Hooke, published shortly after Hooke's death, has no portrait of him.

Two contemporaneous, written descriptions of Hooke's appearance have survived; his close friend John Aubrey described him in middle age and at the height of his creative powers:

He is but of midling stature, something crooked, pale faced, and his face but little below, but his head is lardge, his eie full and popping, and not quick; a grey eie. He haz a delicate head of haire, browne, and of an excellent moist curle. He is and ever was temperate and moderate in dyet, etc.

— Brief Lives

Richard Waller, writing in 1705 in The Posthumous Works of Robert Hooke, described the elderly Hooke:

As to his Person he was but despicable, being very crooked, tho' I have heard from himself, and others, that he was strait till about 16 Years of Age when he first grew awry, by frequent practising, with a Turn-Lath ... He was always very pale and lean, and laterly nothing but Skin and Bone, with a Meagre Aspect, his Eyes grey and full, with a sharp ingenious Look whilst younger; his nose but thin, of a moderate height and length; his Mouth meanly wide, and upper lip thin; his Chin sharp, and Forehead large; his Head of a middle size. He wore his own Hair of a dark Brown colour, very long and hanging neglected over his Face uncut and lank ...

On 3 July 1939, Time magazine published a portrait, supposedly of Hooke, but when Ashley Montagu traced the source, it was found to lack a verifiable connection to Hooke. Montagu found the two contemporaneous written descriptions of Hooke's appearance agree with one another but that neither matches the portrait in Time.

In 2003, historian Lisa Jardine conjectured that a recently discovered portrait was of Hooke, but this proposal was disproved by William B. Jensen of the University of Cincinnati who identified the subject as the Flemish scholar Jan Baptist van Helmont.

Other possible likenesses of Hooke include:

- A seal used by Hooke displays an unusual profile portrait of a man's head, which some have said portrays Hooke.
- The engraved frontispiece to the 1728 edition of Chambers' Cyclopedia shows a drawing of a bust of Robert Hooke. The extent to which the drawing is based on a real work of art is unknown.
- A memorial window existed at St Helen's Church, Bishopsgate, London, but it was a formulaic rendering rather than an accurate likeness. The window was destroyed in the 1993 Bishopsgate bombing.

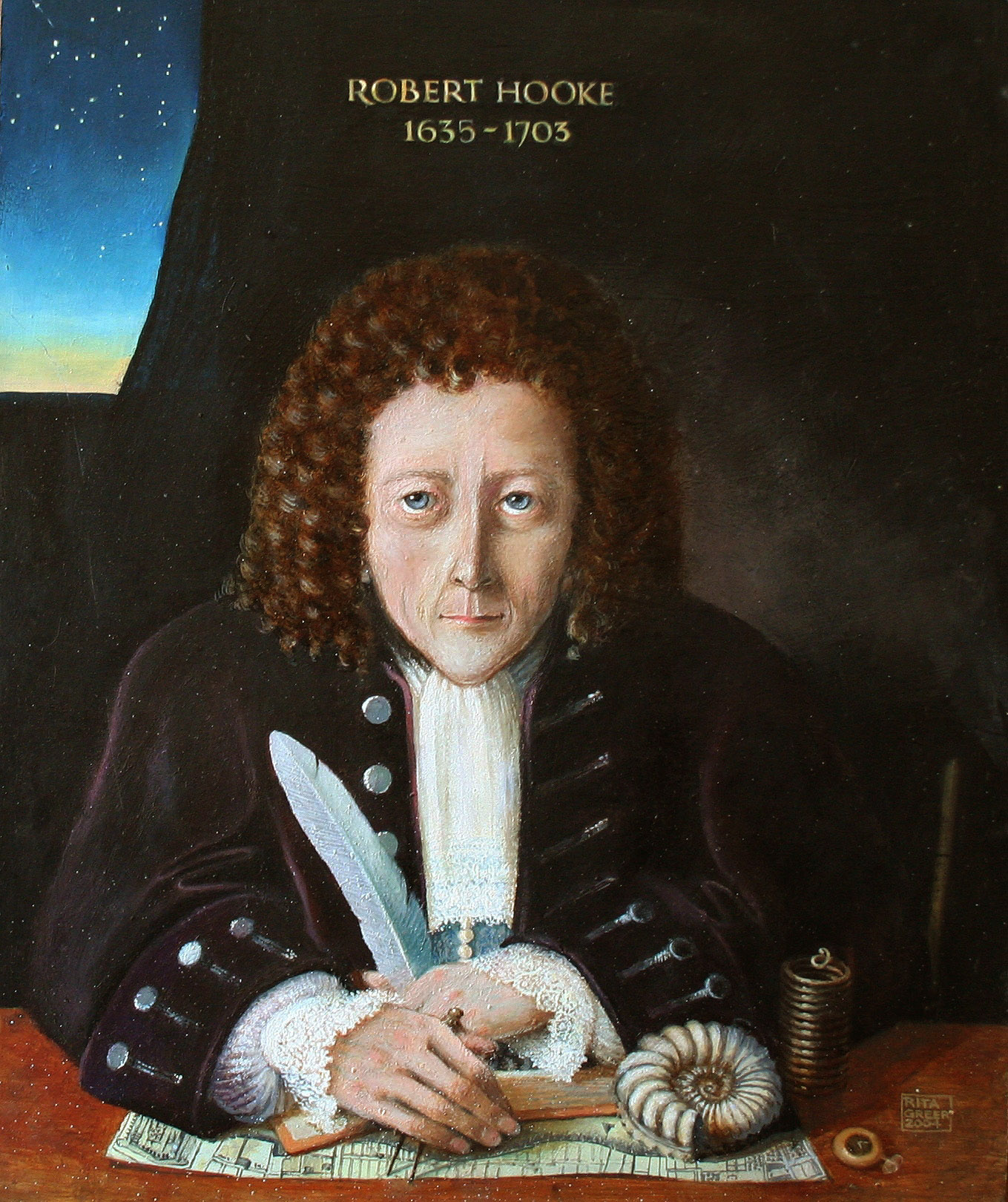
Rita Greer's imagined portrait of Hooke

In 2003, the amateur painter Rita Greer embarked on a project to memorialise Hooke and produce credible images of him, both painted and drawn, which she believes match Aubrey's and Waller's descriptions of him. Greer's images of Hooke, which are free to use under the Free Art License, have been used for television programmes in the UK and the US, in books and magazines, and for public relations.

In 2019, Larry Griffing, an associate professor in biology at Texas A&M University, proposed that a portrait by Mary Beale of an unknown sitter and referred to as Portrait of a Mathematician – is actually of Hooke, noting the physical features of the sitter in the portrait match Hooke's. The figure points to a drawing of elliptical motion that appears to match an unpublished manuscript created by him. The painting also includes an orrery depicting the same principle. According to Griffing, buildings included in the image are of Lowther Castle, now in Cumbria, and its Church of St Michael. The church was renovated under one of Hooke's architectural commissions, which Beale would have known from her extensive body of work for the Lowther family. According to Griffing, the painting would once have been owned by the Royal Society but was abandoned when Newton, its president, moved the society's headquarters in 1710. Christopher Whittaker of the School of Education, University of Durham, England, has questioned Griffing's analysis; according to Whittaker, it is more likely to be of Isaac Barrow. In a response to Whittaker, Griffing reaffirmed his deduction.

== Commemorations ==
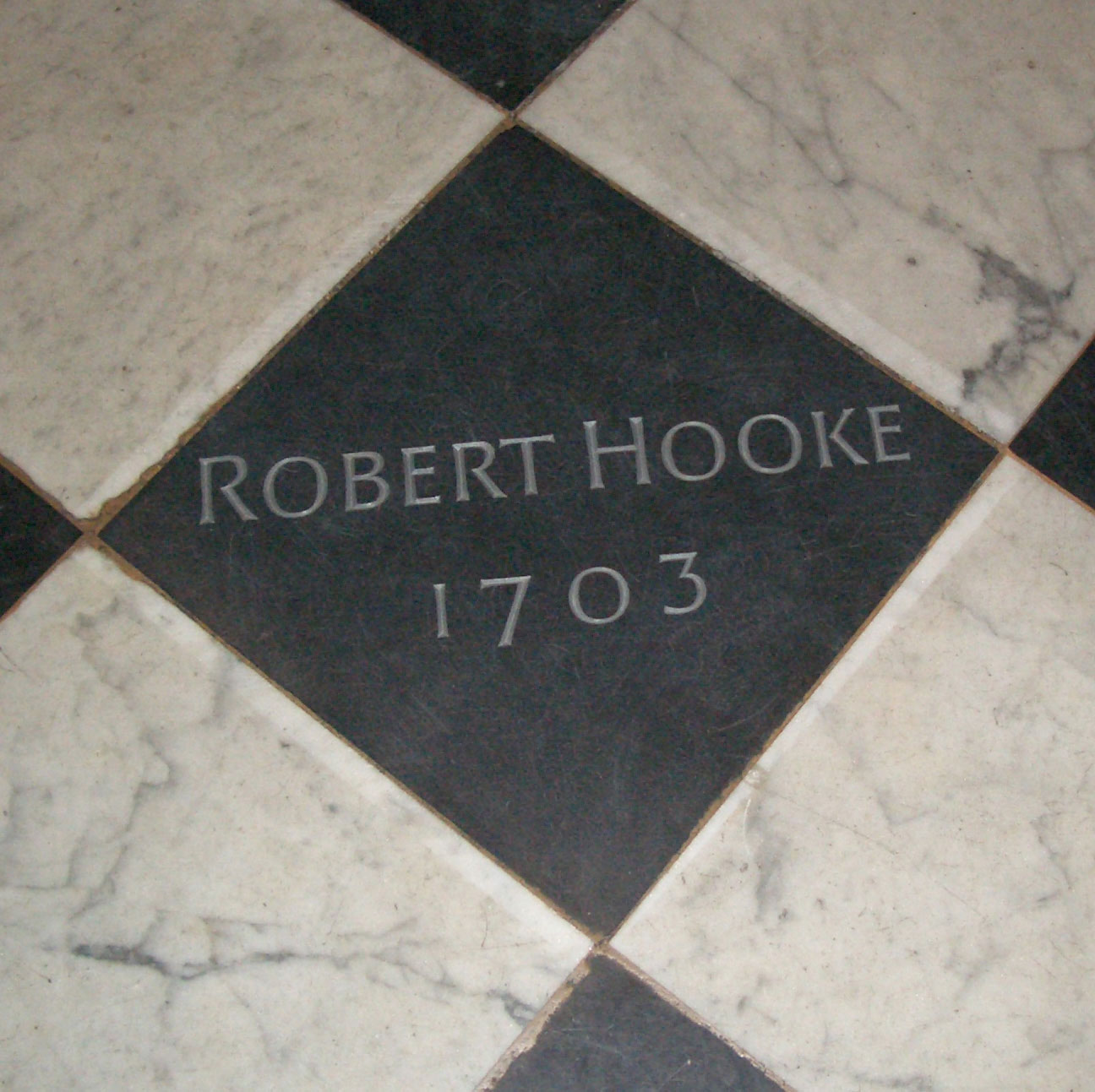
Hooke memorial plaque in Westminster Abbey

- 3514 Hooke, an asteroid (1971 UJ)
- A crater on the Moon and another on Mars are named in his honour.
- The Hooke Medal is an annual award by the British Society for Cell Biology, to recognise "an emerging leader in cell biology".
- List of new memorials to Robert Hooke 2005–2009 erected the occasion of the tercentenary of his death
- The Boyle-Hooke plaque in Oxford

== Works ==
- Reponse de Monsieur Hook aux considerations de M. Auzout contenue dans un lettre ecrite a l'auteur des Philosophical Transactions et quelques lettres ecrites de part & d'autre sur le sujet des grandes lunettes [Reply of Mr. Hook to the considerations of Mr. Auzout contained in a letter written to the author of Philosophical Transactions and some letters written on both sides on the subject of large lenses] (in French). Paris: Jean Cusson (2.). 1665.
- Lectures de potentia restitutiva, or, Of spring explaining the power of springing bodies. London : Printed for John Martyn. 1678.
- Micrographia: Hooke, Robert (1635–1703). Micrographia: or some physiological descriptions of minute bodies made by magnifying glasses with observations and inquiries thereupon...
- Collection of Lectures: Physical, Mechanical, Geographical and Astronomical. London : Printed for John Martyn, printer to the Royal Society, at the Bell in S. Pauls Church-yard. 1679. includes An Attempt to prove the Annual Motion of the Earth, Animadversions on the Machina Coelestis of Mr. Hevelius, A Description of Helioscopes with other instruments, Mechanical Improvement of Lamps, Remarks about Comets 1677, Microscopium, Lectures on the Spring, etc.
- Philosophical experiments and observations. London: William Innys & John Innys. 1726.
- The posthumous works of Robert Hooke, M.D. S.R.S. Geom. Prof. Gresh. etc. containing his Cutlerian lectures, and other discourses, read at the meetings of the illustrious Royal Society... illustrated with sculptures. To these discourses is prefixt the author's life, giving an account of his studies and employments, with an enumeration of the many experiments, instruments, contrivances and inventions, by him made and produced as curator of experiments to the Royal Society. Richard Waller, R.S. Secr. 1705.
Lectures de potentia restitutiva
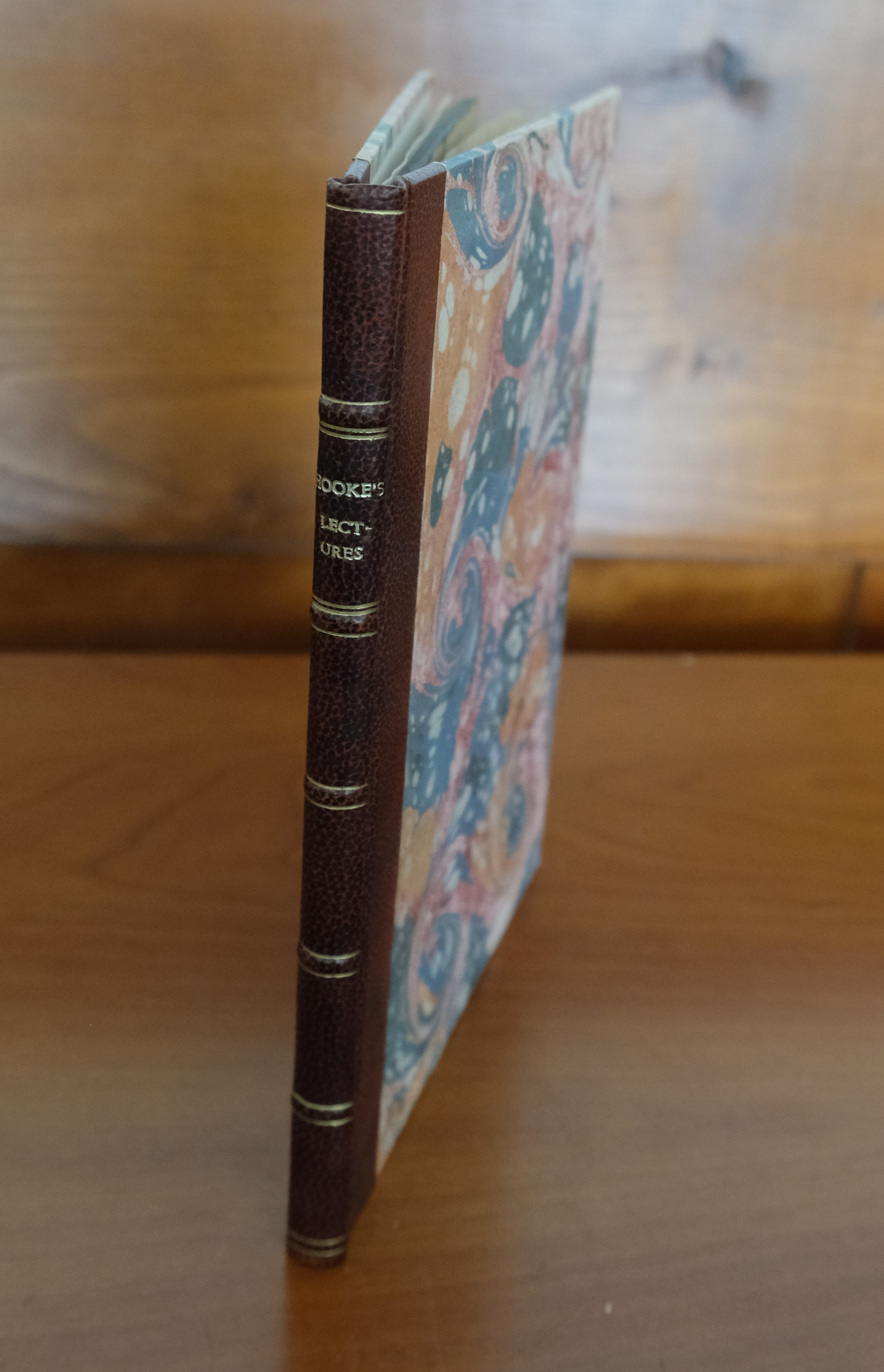
1678 copy of Hooke's Lectures de potentia restitutiva

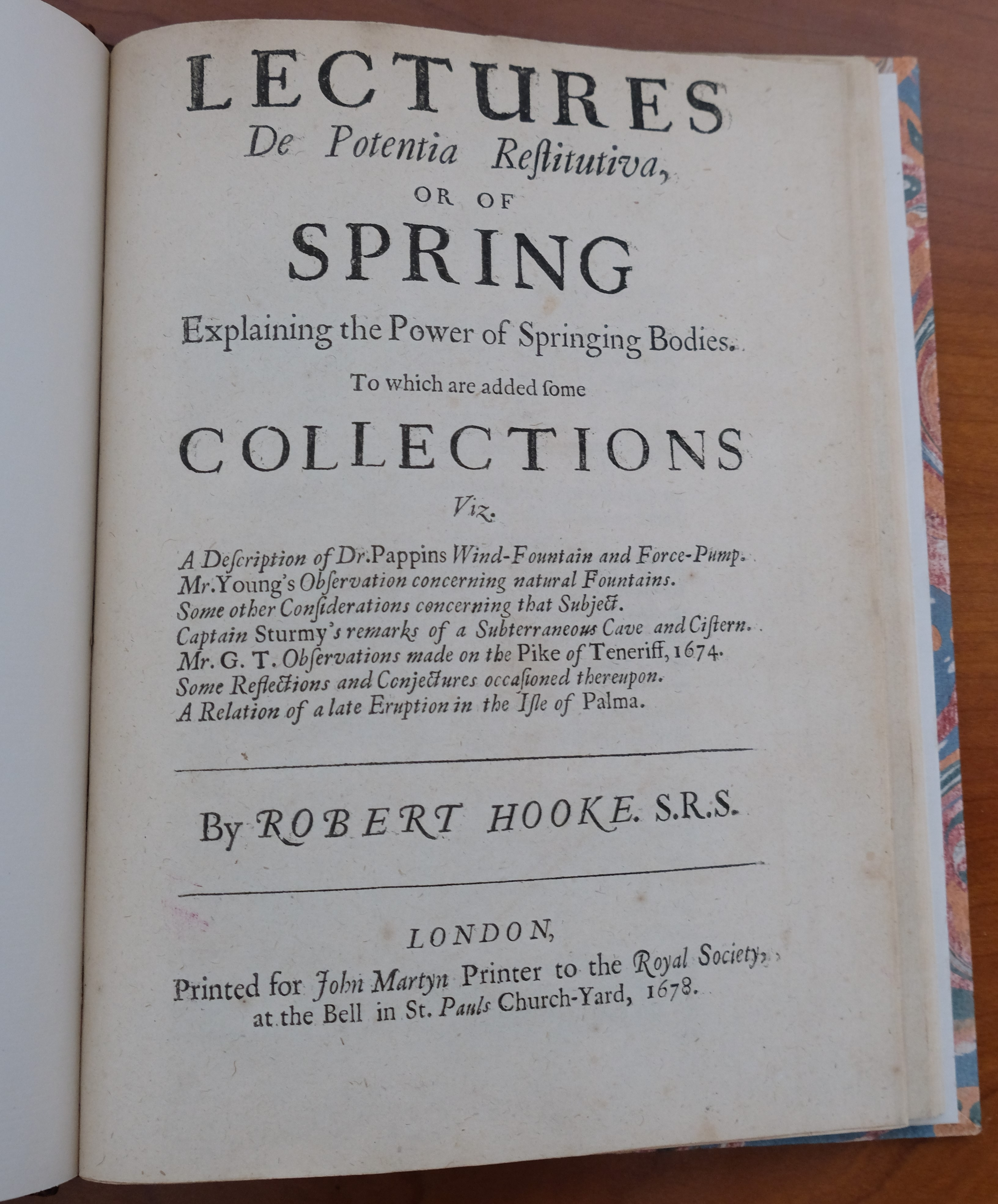
Title page of Lectures de potentia restitutiva

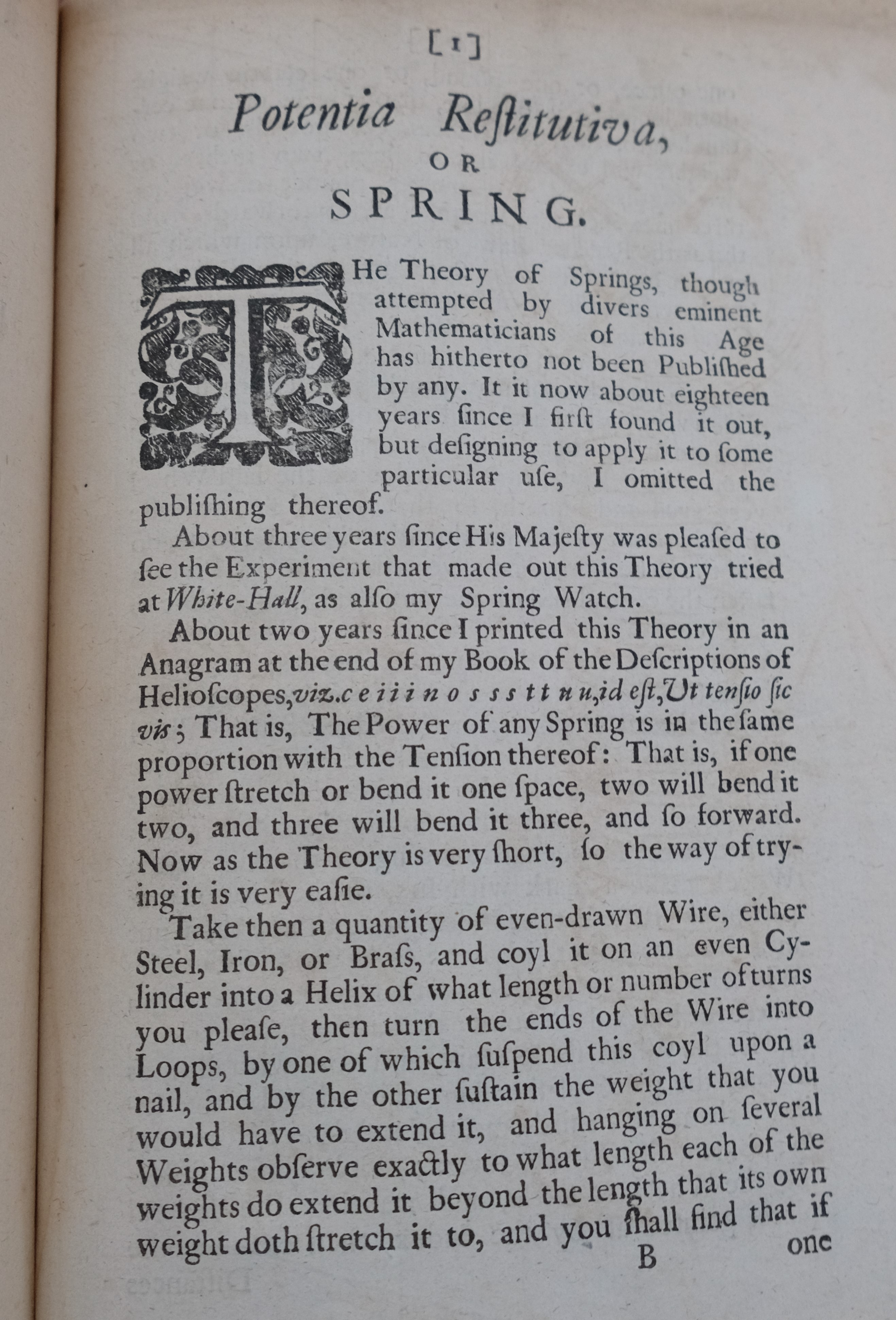
First page of Lectures de potentia restitutiva

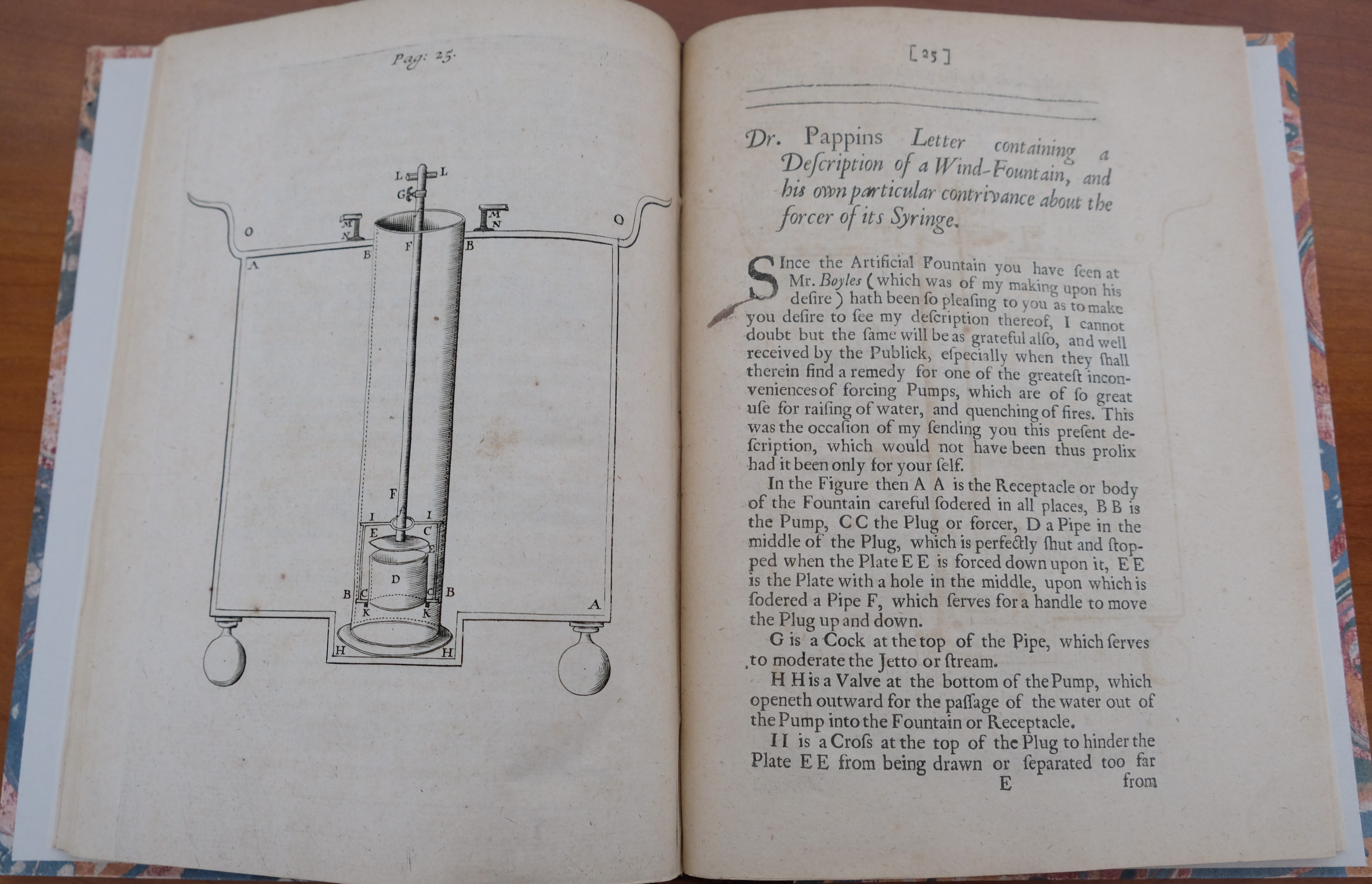
Figure from Lectures de potentia restitutiva

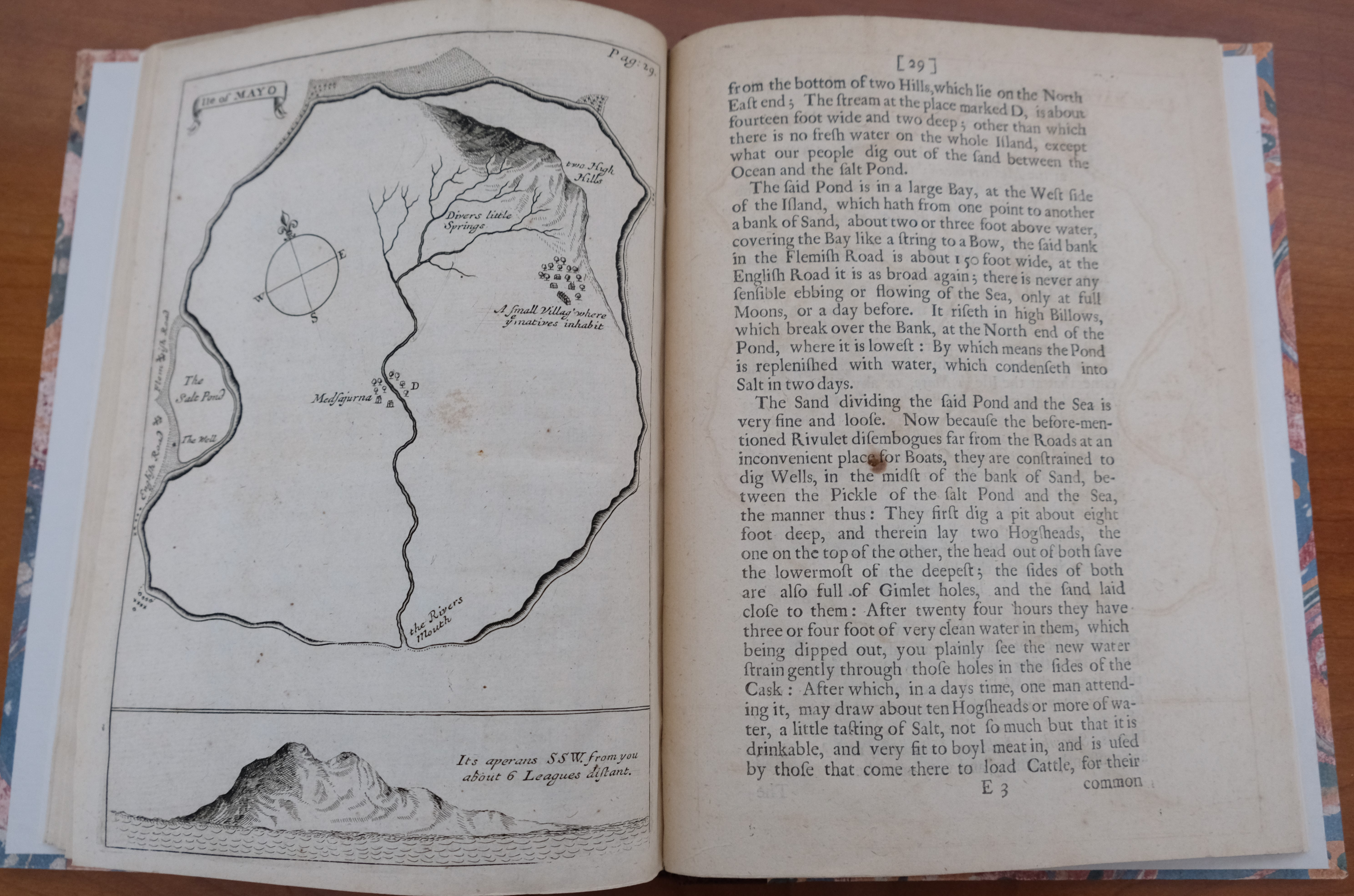
Figure from Lectures de potentia restitutiva

== See also ==
- Catenary – Curve formed by a hanging chain
- Great Red Spot – Persistent storm in Jupiter's atmosphere
- Hooke's atom – Artificial helium-like atom with a harmonic instead of Coulomb potential
- Hooke's law – Force needed to pull a spring grows linearly with distance
- Optical microscope – Microscope that uses visible light
- Reticle – Aim markings in optical devices, e.g. crosshairs
- Sash window – Window made of one or more movable panels
- Savart wheel – Acoustical device to generate a pitch
- Shadowgraph – Optical method to reveal non-uniformity
- Universal joint – Mechanism with bendable rotation axis
- List of astronomical instrument makers
