= Micrographia =

1665 book by Robert Hooke

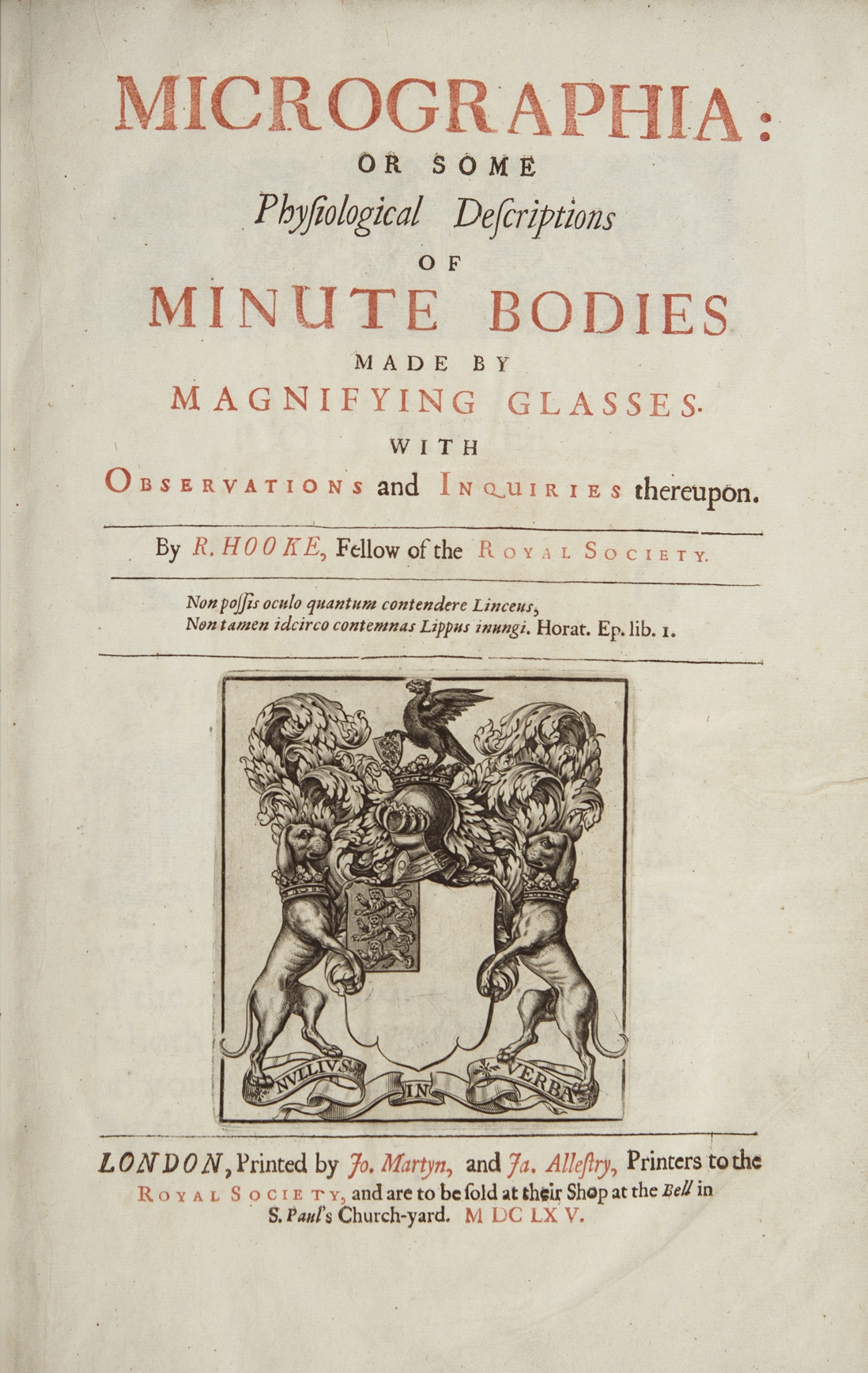
- Title page of Micrographia
- Author: Robert Hooke
- Original title: Micrographia: or Some Physiological Descriptions of Minute Bodies Made by Magnifying Glasses. With Observations and Inquiries Thereupon
- Language: English
- Genre: Microscopy
- Publisher: The Royal Society
- Publication date: January 1665
- Publication place: Great Britain

Micrographia: or Some Physiological Descriptions of Minute Bodies Made by Magnifying Glasses. With Observations and Inquiries Thereupon is a historically significant book by Robert Hooke about his observations through various lenses. It was the first book to include illustrations of insects and plants as seen through microscopes.

Published in January 1665, the first major publication of the Royal Society, it became the first scientific best-seller, inspiring a wide public interest in the new science of microscopy. The book originated the biological term "cell".

== Observations ==
Hooke most famously describes a fly's eye and a plant cell (where he coined that term because plant cells, which are walled, reminded him of the cells of a monastery). Known for its spectacular copperplate of the miniature world, particularly its fold-out plates of insects, the text itself reinforces the tremendous power of the new microscope. The plates of insects fold out to be larger than the large folio itself, the engraving of the louse in particular folding out to four times the size of the book. Although the book is best known for demonstrating the power of the microscope, Micrographia also describes distant planetary bodies, the wave theory of light, the organic origin of fossils, and other philosophical and scientific interests of its author.

Hooke also selected several objects of human origin; among these objects were the jagged edge of a honed razor and the point of a needle, seeming blunt under the microscope. His goal may well have been to contrast the flawed products of mankind with the perfection of nature (and hence, in the spirit of the times, of biblical creation).

Diagram Schem. 12

Gallery

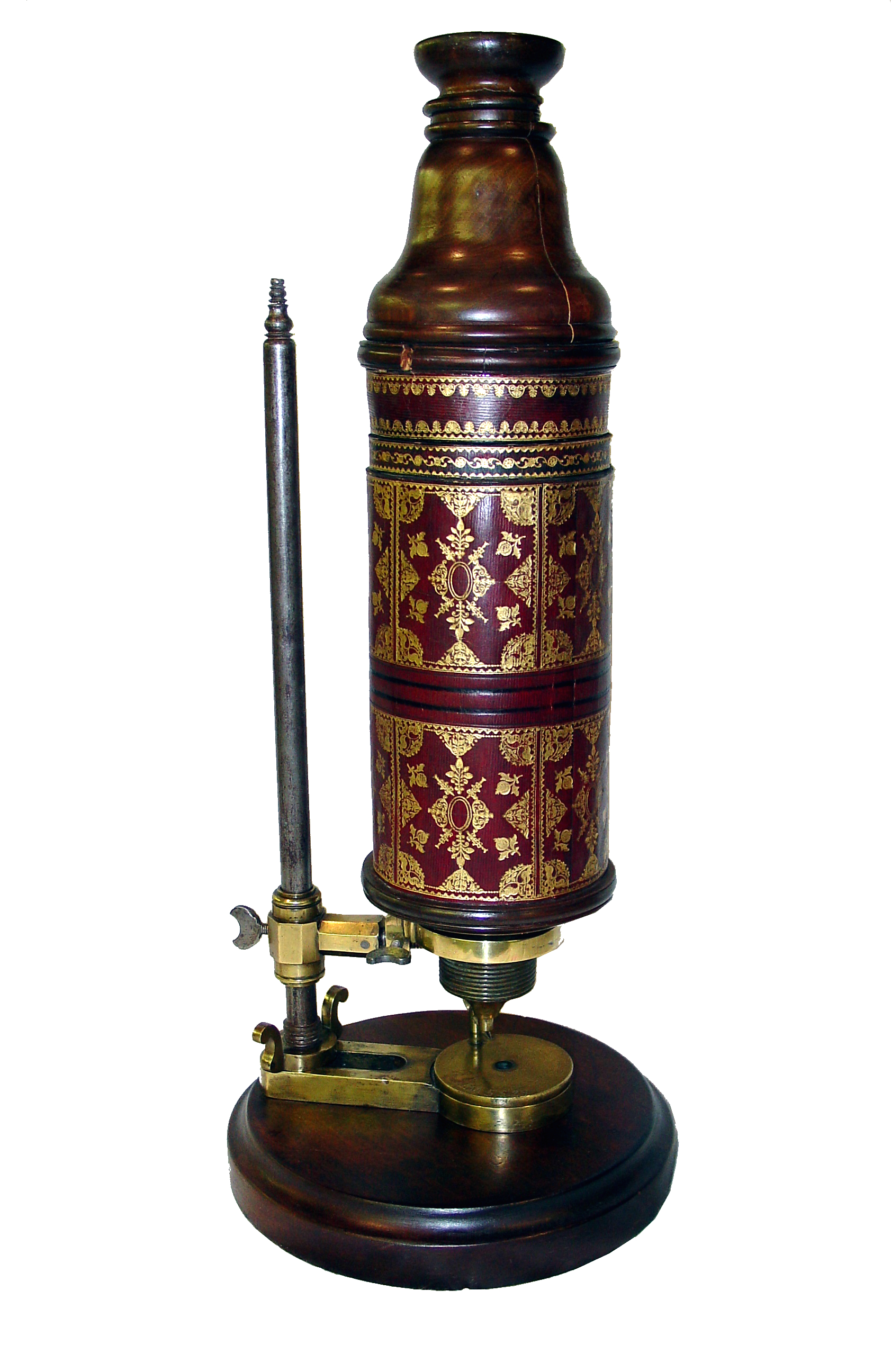
Microscope manufactured by Christopher Cock of London for Robert Hooke. Hooke is believed to have used this microscope for the observations that formed the basis of Micrographia. (M-030 00276) Courtesy - Billings Microscope Collection, National Museum of Health and Medicine, Maryland.

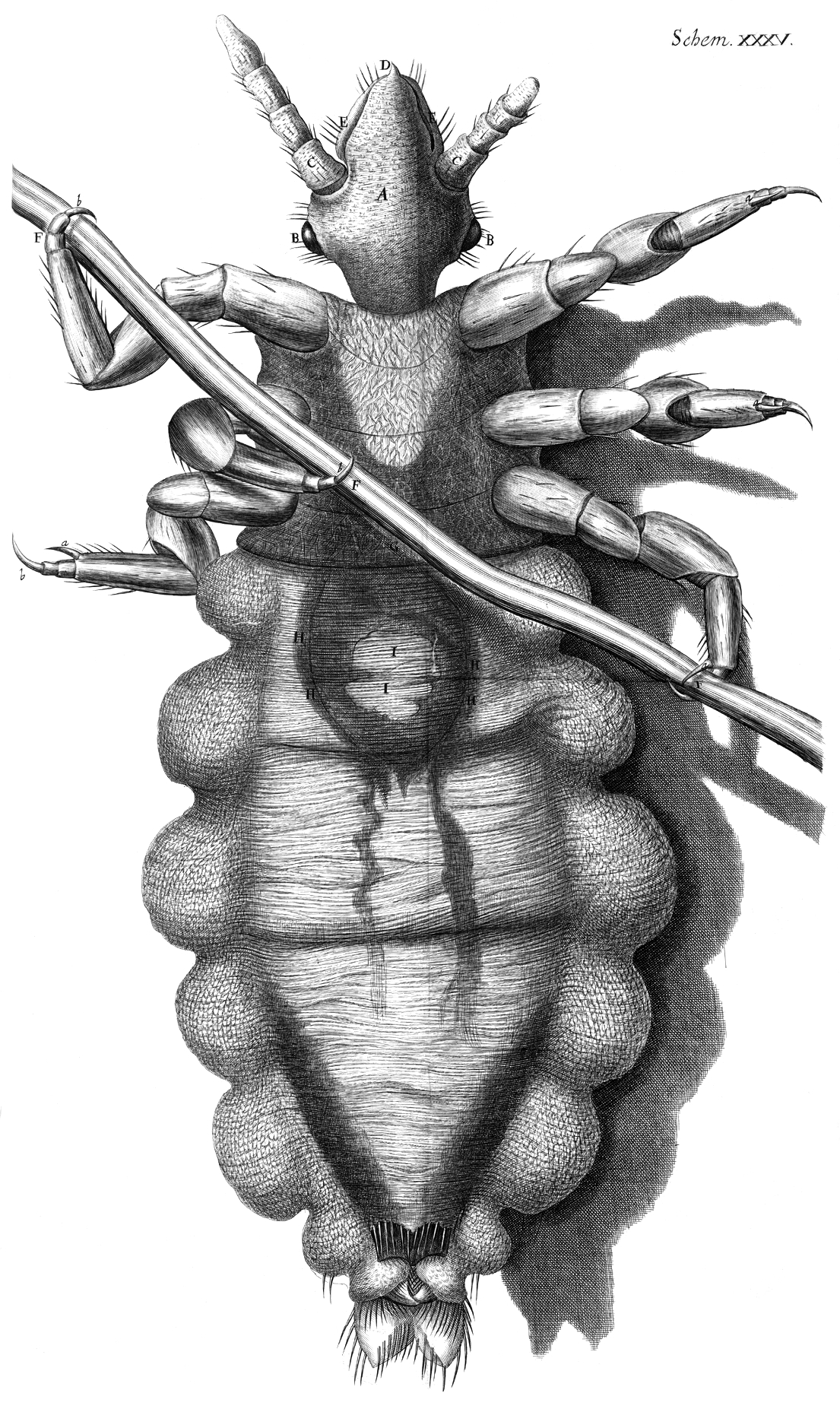
Hooke's drawing of a louse

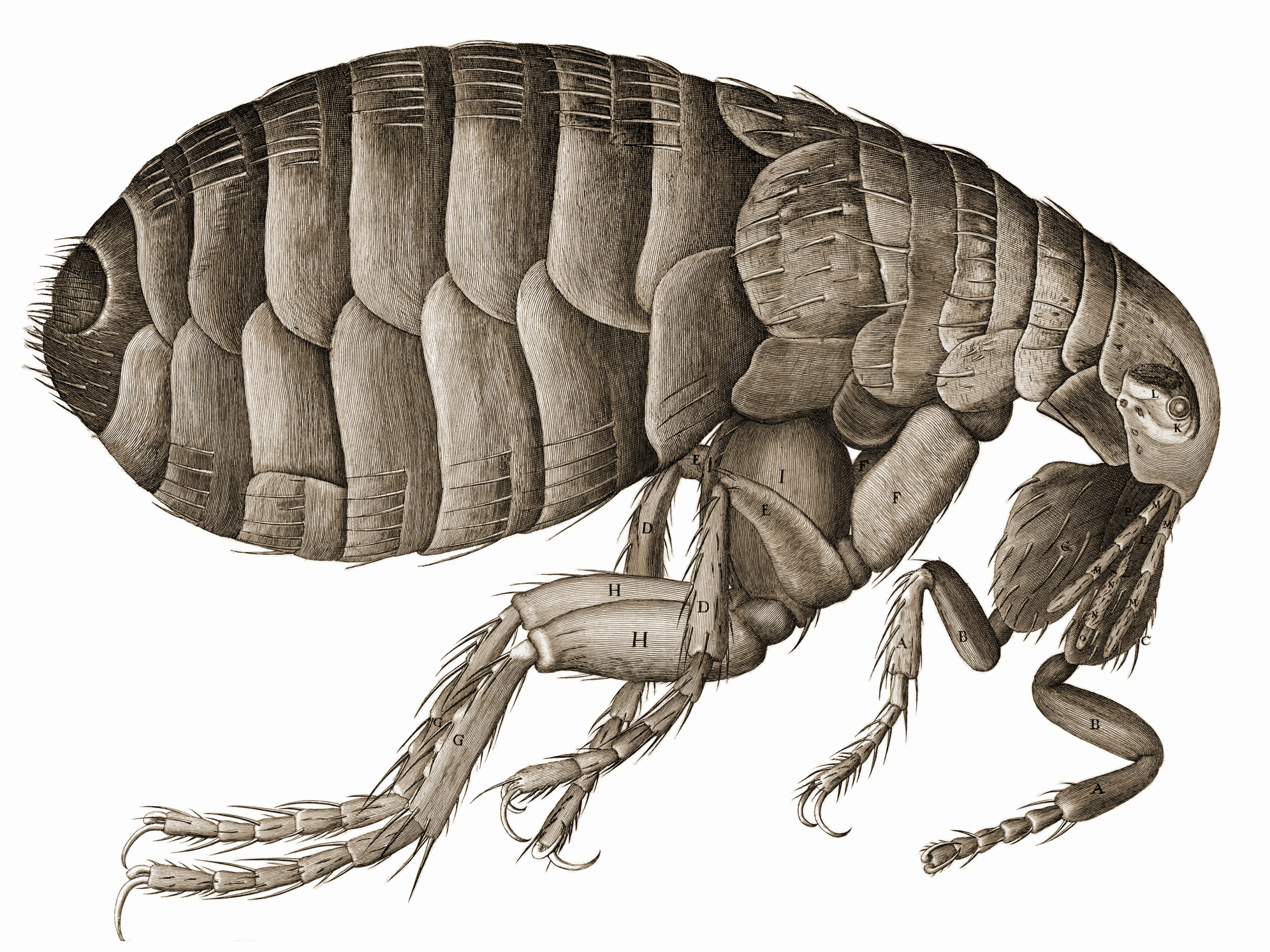
Hooke's drawing of a flea

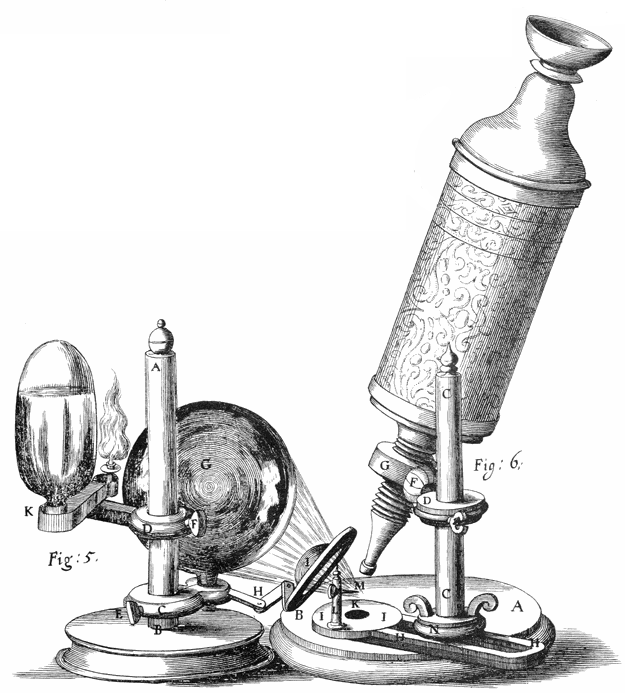
Hooke's microscope

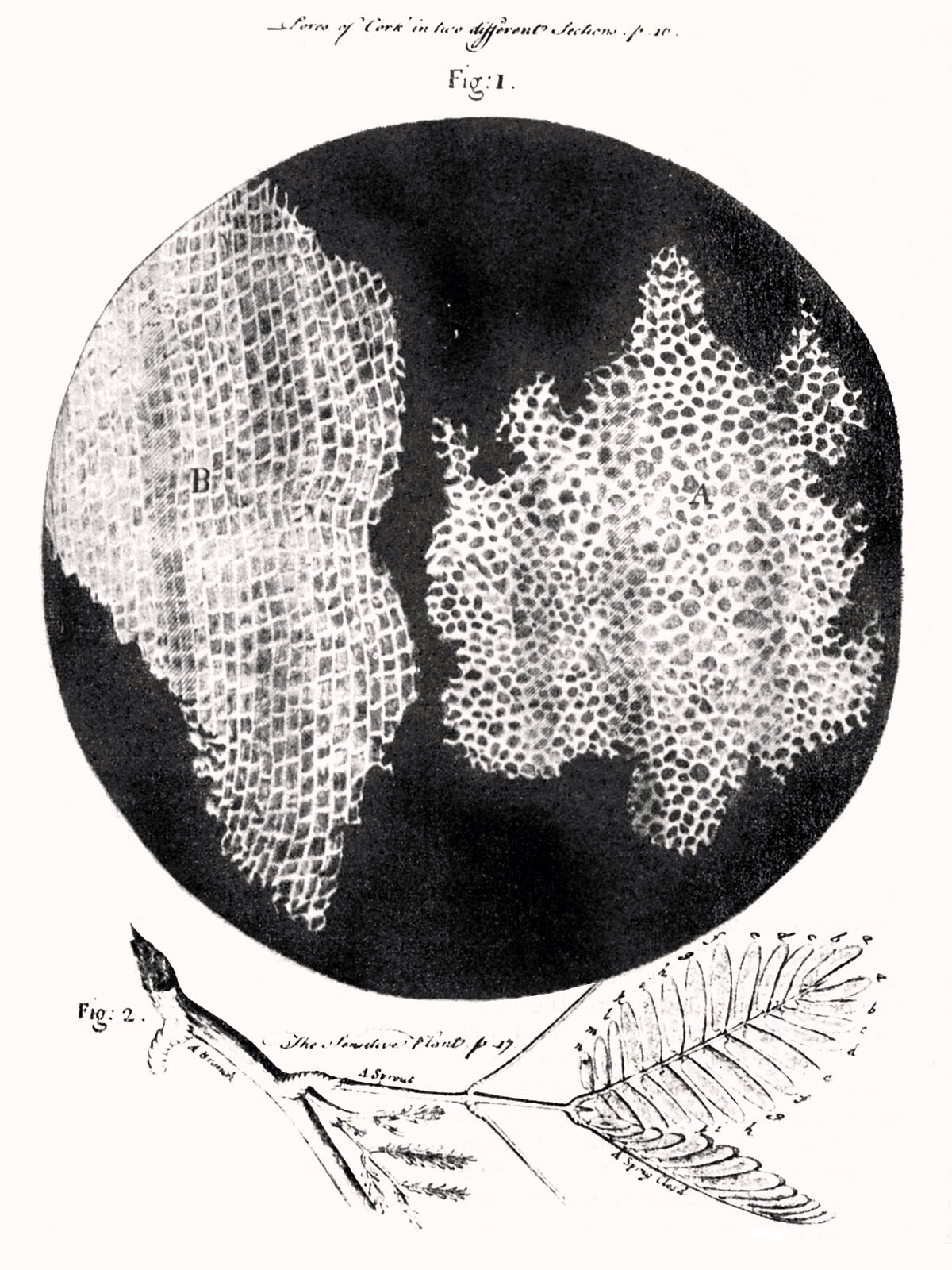
Hooke was the first to apply the word "cell" to biological objects: Cork.

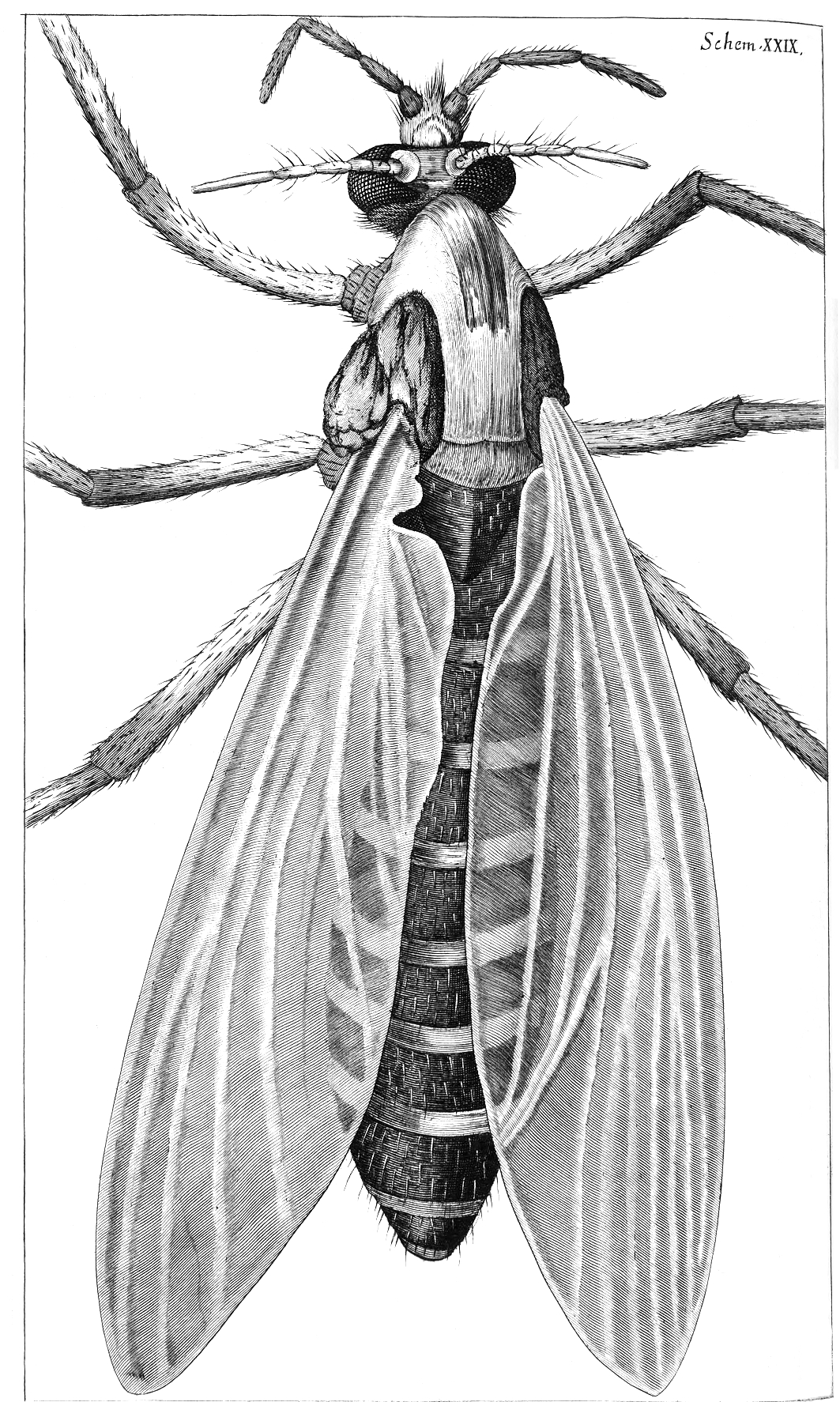
Hooke's drawing of a gnat

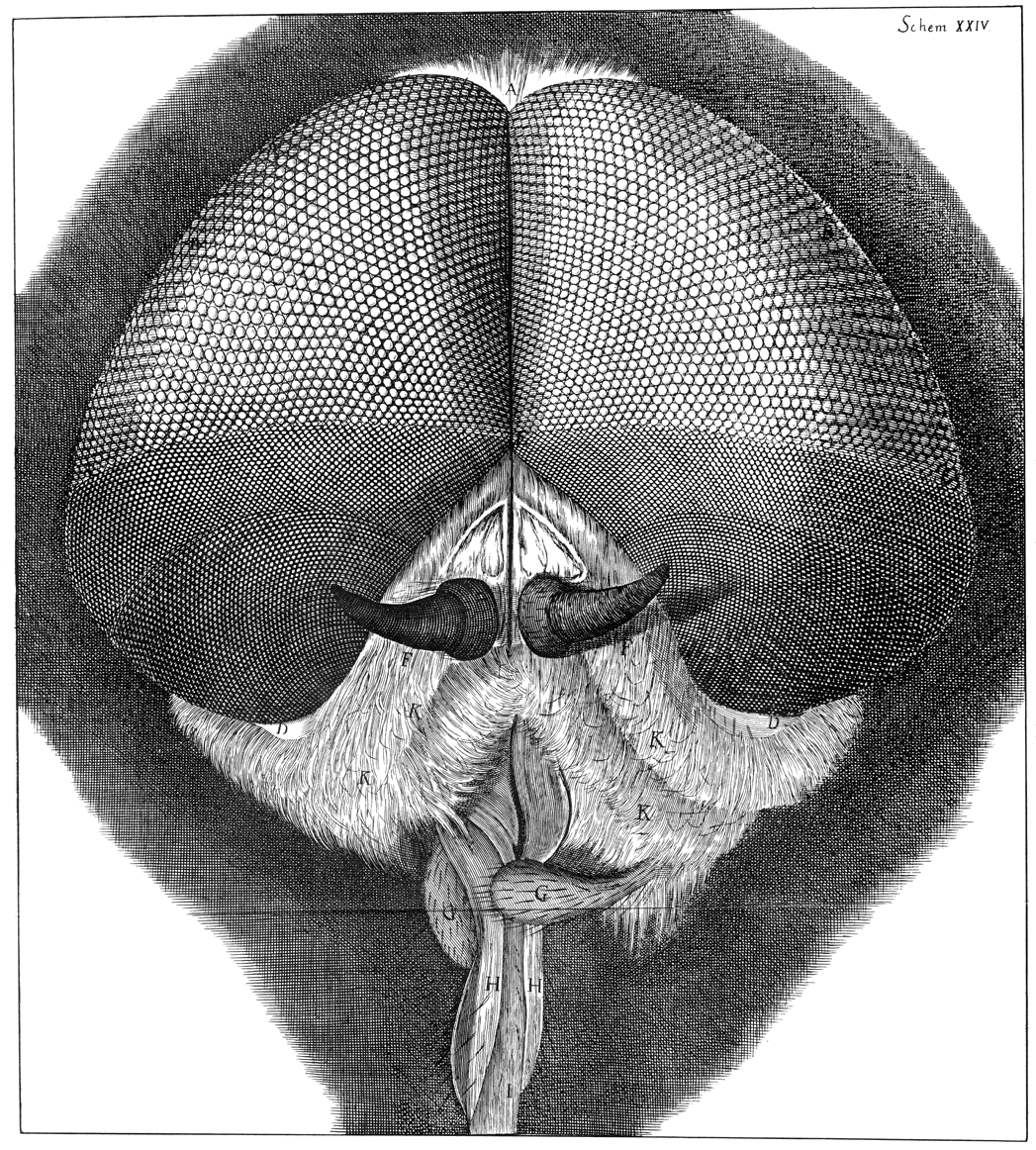
Hooke's drawing of a grey dronefly

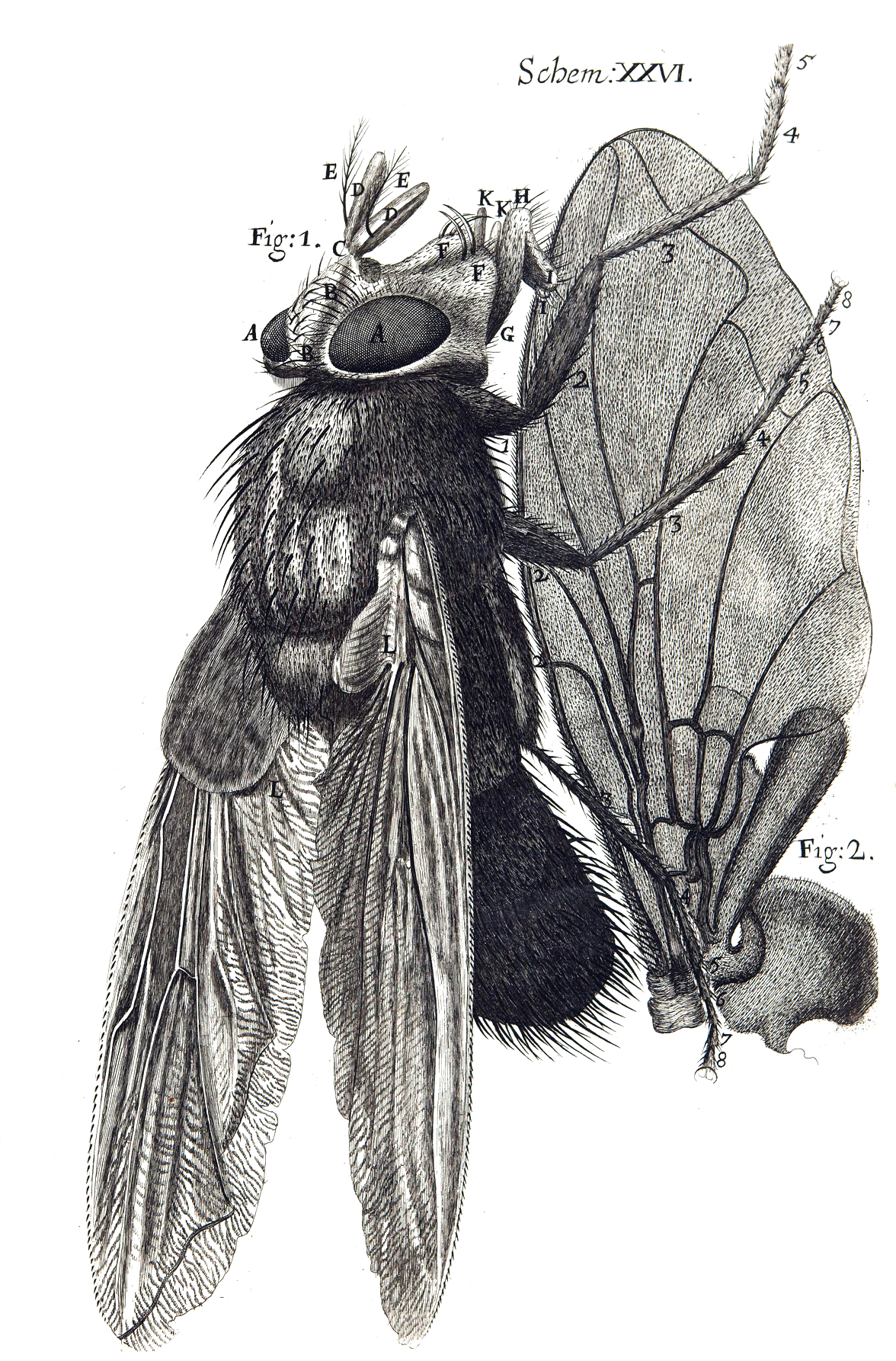
Hooke's drawing of a blue fly

== Reception ==
Published under the aegis of the Royal Society, the popularity of the book helped further the society's image and mission of being England's leading scientific organization. Micrographia's illustrations of the miniature world captured the public's imagination in a radically new way; Samuel Pepys called it "the most ingenious book that ever I read in my life".

== Methods ==
In 2007, Janice Neri, a professor of art history and visual culture, studied Hooke's artistic influences and processes with the help of some newly rediscovered notes and drawings that appear to show some of his work leading up to Micrographia. She observes, "Hooke's use of the term "schema" to identify his plates indicates that he approached his images in a diagrammatic manner and implies the study or visual dissection of the objects portrayed." Identifying Hooke's schema as 'organization tools', she emphasizes:

Hooke built up his images from numerous observations made from multiple vantage points, under varying lighting conditions, and with lenses of differing powers. Similarly, his specimens required a great deal of manipulation and preparation in order to make them visible through the microscope.

Additionally: "Hooke often enclosed the objects he presented within a round frame, thus offering viewers an evocation of the experience of looking through the lens of a microscope."

== Bibliography ==
- Robert Hooke. Micrographia: or, Some physiological descriptions of minute bodies made by magnifying glasses. London: J. Martyn and J. Allestry, 1665. (first edition).
