= Indian Vaccination Act of 1832 =

Act to vaccinate Indian Americans for smallpox

- Long title: An Act to provide the means of extending the benefits of vaccination, as a preventive of small-pox, to the Indian tribes, and thereby, as far as possible, to save them from the destructive ravages of that disease.
- Enacted by: the 22nd United States Congress
- Effective: May 5, 1832

Citations
- Public law: Pub. L. 22–75
- Statutes at Large: 4 Stat. 514

Legislative history
- Introduced in the House as H.R. 526; Passed the House on April 9, 1832 (Passed); Passed the Senate on April 24, 1832 (31-10); Signed into law by President Andrew Jackson on May 5, 1832

Indian Vaccination Act of 1832 is a US federal law passed by the US Congress in 1832. The purpose of the act was to vaccinate the American Indians against smallpox to prevent the spread of the disease.

== History ==
The act was first passed on May 5, 1832. Lewis Cass, Secretary of War, designed the act. Members of Congress appropriated US$12,000 (approximately $410,000 in current money) to vaccinate them. By February 1, 1833, more than 17,000 Indians had been vaccinated.

Congress allocated $12,000 for the entire program, to be administered by Indian agents and sub-agents. Some US army surgeons refused to participate due to the lack of funds, leaving agents themselves and others with no medical training to produce and administer vaccines. However, not everyone was included. As a result, a few years later, smallpox killed 90% of the Mandan Indians, who had been excluded from the act. It also excluded Hidatsas and Arikaras.

== See also ==
- 1721 Boston smallpox outbreak
- 1738–1739 North Carolina smallpox epidemic
- 1770s Pacific Northwest smallpox epidemic
- 1775–1782 North American smallpox epidemic
- 1837 Great Plains smallpox epidemic
- 1862 Pacific Northwest smallpox epidemic

History of Variola Inoculation
Benjamin Waterhouse	Ottoman Smallpox Inoculation
Edward Jenner	Smallpox Vaccine
James Smith	Vaccine Act of 1813
John Redman Coxe	Valentine Seaman
Norfolk Anti-Inoculation Riot of 1768	Variolation

== Plenipotentiary letters regarding smallpox in Colonial America ==
- Jefferson, Thomas (March 20, 1764). "Medicine". Thomas Jefferson's Monticello. Thomas Jefferson Foundation.
- Washington, George (January 1, 1775). "Disease in the Revolutionary War". George Washington's Mount Vernon. The Mount Vernon Ladies' Association.
- Washington, George (January 1, 1777). "Smallpox". George Washington's Mount Vernon. The Mount Vernon Ladies' Association.
- Washington, George (March 12, 1777). "Smallpox Inoculation Letter". George Washington's Mount Vernon. The Mount Vernon Ladies' Association.
- Jefferson, Thomas (December 27, 1777). "Bill concerning Inoculation for Smallpox". Founders Online. U.S. National Archives and Records Administration.
- Jefferson, Thomas (June 18, 1779). "77. A Bill to Prevent the Spreading of the Small-Pox". Founders Online. U.S. National Archives and Records Administration.
- Madison, James (October 31, 1785). "Bills for a Revised State Code of Laws". Founders Online. U.S. National Archives and Records Administration.
- Waterhouse, Benjamin (December 1, 1800). "To Thomas Jefferson from Benjamin Waterhouse, 1 December 1800". Founders Online. U.S. National Archives and Records Administration. hdl:loc.mss/mtj.mtjbib009481.
- Jenner, Edward (1800). "An Inquiry into the Causes and Effects of the Variolae Vaccinae: A Disease Discovered in Some of the Western Counties of England, particularly Gloucestershire, and Known by the Name of the Cow Pox". HathiTrust Digital Library. Sampson Low. hdl:loc.rbc/General.36460.1. OCLC 488553153.
- Waterhouse, Benjamin (1800). "A Prospect of Exterminating the Small-Pox: Being the History of the Variolae Vaccinae, or Kine-Pox, commonly called the Cow-Pox". HathiTrust Digital Library. Cambridge Press. OCLC 912241814.
- Waterhouse, Benjamin (June 8, 1801). "To Thomas Jefferson from Benjamin Waterhouse, 8 June 1801". Founders Online. U.S. National Archives and Records Administration.
- Waterhouse, Benjamin (November 16, 1801). "To Thomas Jefferson from Benjamin Waterhouse, 16 November 1801". Founders Online. U.S. National Archives and Records Administration. hdl:loc.mss/mtj.mtjbib010741.
- Jefferson, Thomas (1801). "Inoculation". Thomas Jefferson's Monticello. Thomas Jefferson Foundation.
- Waterhouse, Benjamin (January 11, 1802). "To Thomas Jefferson from Benjamin Waterhouse, 11 January 1802". Founders Online. U.S. National Archives and Records Administration. hdl:loc.mss/mtj.mtjbib010994.
- Coxe, John Redman (December 10, 1802). "To Thomas Jefferson from John Redman Coxe, 10 December 1802". Founders Online. U.S. National Archives and Records Administration. hdl:loc.mss/mtj.mtjbib011964.
- Coxe, John Redman (1802). "Practical Observations on Vaccination or Inoculation for the Cow-Pock". HathiTrust Digital Library. James Humphreys. hdl:loc.gdc/scd0001.00025897419. LCCN 07032543. OCLC 915511206.
- Jefferson, Thomas (May 14, 1806). "From Thomas Jefferson to George C. Jenner, 14 May 1806" [Commending the merits of vaccination for communicable disease]. Founders Online. Monticello, Virginia: U.S. National Archives and Records Administration. hdl:loc.mss/mtj.mtjbib016128.

== General Court of Massachusetts Province Laws ==
- "Chapter 13: An Act To Prevent Persons Concealing The Small-Pox". State Library of Massachusetts Digital Collections. Boston: Secretary of the Commonwealth. February 3, 1732. pp. 621–622.
- "Chapter 17: An Act To Prevent The Spreading Of The Small-Pox And Other Infectious Sickness, And To Prevent The Concealing Of The Same". State Library of Massachusetts Digital Collections. Boston: Secretary of the Commonwealth. January 17, 1743. pp. 35–37.
- "Chapter 17: An Act To Prevent, If Possible, The Further Spreading Of The Smallpox In The Town Of Boston". State Library of Massachusetts Digital Collections. Boston: Secretary of the Commonwealth. January 20, 1764. p. 668.

== Audio media archive ==
- The Ravages of the Small Pox: Jefferson and Inoculation (Podcast). Monticello, Virginia: Thomas Jefferson Foundation.
- Thomas Jefferson's Health Habits (Podcast). Monticello, Virginia: Thomas Jefferson Foundation.
