= Vaccine Act of 1813 =

US Act to encourage smallpox vaccinations

- Long title: An Act to encourage Vaccination.
- Nicknames: Vaccine Circulation Act of 1813
- Enacted by: the 12th United States Congress
- Effective: February 27, 1813

Citations
- Public law: Pub. L. 12–37
- Statutes at Large: 2 Stat. 806

Codification
- Acts repealed: Pub. L. 17–50; 3 Stat. 677

Legislative history
- Signed into law by President James Madison on February 27, 1813

Vaccine Act of 1813 was an Act of the Twelfth Congress of the United States to encourage vaccination against smallpox. It was passed 27 February 1813 and repealed 4 May 1822. The Act was the first federal law concerning consumer protection and pharmaceuticals.

Dr. Edward Jenner discovered smallpox vaccine in 1796, and hucksters quickly exploited the demand for vaccine by offering fraudulent versions. The Act made these provisions:

- a federal agent charged with preserving genuine vaccine
- authority for the agent to distribute vaccine to any US citizen
- distribution of legitimate vaccine postage-free (franking privilege)

The Act was repealed in 1822, and the authority to regulate vaccines given to the states. This repeal was the result of an 1821 outbreak of smallpox in North Carolina, which was traced to samples of smallpox, instead of vaccine, accidentally provided by Dr. James Smith while in the capacity of the federal agent charged with preserving and distributing genuine vaccine.

== Text ==
The Act is brief (as compared to modern legislation) and is therefore reproduced in its entirety here:

CHAP. XXXVII.—An Act to encourage Vaccination.

Be it enacted by the Senate and House of Representatives of the United States of America in Congress assembled, That the President of the United States be, and he is hereby authorized to appoint an agent to preserve the genuine vaccine matter, and to furnish the same to any citizen of the United States, whenever it may be applied for, through the medium of the post-office; and such agent shall, previous to his entering upon the execution of the duties assigned to him by this act, and before he shall be entitled to the privilege of franking any letter or package as herein allowed, take and subscribe the following oath or affirmation, before some magistrate, and cause a certificate thereof to be filed in the general post-office: "I, A. B. do swear (or affirm, as the case may be) that I will faithfully use my best exertions to preserve the genuine vaccine matter, and to furnish the same to the citizens of the United States; and also, that I will abstain from every thing prohibited in relation to the establishment of the post-office of the United States." And it shall be the duty of the said agent to transmit to the several postmasters in the United States a copy of this act: and he shall also forward to them a public notice, directing how and where all application shall be made to him for vaccine matter.

SEC. 2. And be it further enacted, That all letters or packages not exceeding half an ounce in weight, containing vaccine matter, or relating to the subject of vaccination, and that alone, shall be carried by the United States' mail free of any postage, either to or from the agent who may be appointed to carry the provisions of this act into effect: Provided always, that the said agent before he delivers any letter for transmission by the mail, shall in his own proper handwriting, on the outside thereof, endorse the word "Vaccination," and thereto subscribe his name, and shall previously furnish the postmaster of the office where he shall deposit the same with a specimen of his signature; and if said agent shall frank any letter or package, in which shall be contained any thing relative to any subject other than vaccination, he shall, on conviction of every such offence, forfeit and pay a fine of fifty dollars, to be recovered in the same manner as other fines or violations of law establishing the post-office: Provided also, that the discharge of any agent, and the appointment of another in his stead, be at the discretion of the President of the United States.

APPROVED, February 27, 1813.

== See also ==
- 1721 Boston smallpox outbreak
- 1738–1739 North Carolina smallpox epidemic
- 1770s Pacific Northwest smallpox epidemic
- 1775–1782 North American smallpox epidemic
- 1837 Great Plains smallpox epidemic
- 1862 Pacific Northwest smallpox epidemic

History of Variola Inoculation
| Benjamin Waterhouse | Norfolk Anti-Inoculation Riot of 1768 |
| David Ramsay | Ottoman Smallpox Inoculation |
| Giacomo Pylarini | Smallpox Vaccine |
| Indian Vaccination Act of 1832 | Valentine Seaman |
| John Redman Coxe | Variolation |

== Resources ==
- "Chapter CLXXIX - An Act to Encourage Vaccination" [Acts passed at the first (and second) session(s) of the Twelfth Congress]. HathiTrust Digital Library. University of Michigan Law School. February 27, 1813. pp. 392–394, IXVIII–IXIX.
- "Chapter 502 [CLXXIX] - An Act to Encourage Vaccination" [Laws of the United States of America, from the 4th of March, 1789, to the 4th of March, 1815]. HathiTrust Digital Library. IV. John Bioren and W. John Duane: 508–509, 884, 911. 1816.
