= James Smith (American physician) =

American physician and vaccine expert (1771–1841)

- Born: 1771; Cecil County, Maryland
- Died: June 12, 1841 (aged 69–70); Pikesville, Maryland
- Other name: Jenner of America
- Education: University of Pennsylvania School of Medicine
- Alma mater: Dickinson College, 1792
- Known for: Smallpox vaccine; Vaccination; War of 1812: Maryland Vaccine Agent, 1809-1832; U.S. Vaccine Agent, 1813-1822; Virginia Vaccine Agent, 1814
- Scientific career
- Fields: Physician-scientist; United States Vaccine Agent
- Workplaces: Baltimore General Dispensary; National Vaccine Institution, Baltimore
- Academic advisors: Benjamin Rush; John Redman Coxe

James Smith (1771 - June 12, 1841), was a Marylander medical doctor serving Baltimore City as a medical practitioner in 1797. In 1801, Smith, advocate for smallpox vaccination, established the Baltimore General Dispensary as a vaccine clinic for the impoverished administering the first smallpox vaccinations in Baltimore County, Maryland. Smith served as a vaccination agent for the states of Maryland and Virginia during the War of 1812.

In 1813, Smith, who acquired the identity Jenner of America recognizing Edward Jenner preliminary discoveries of vaccination methods, emerged as the United States vaccination agent. The Vaccine Act of 1813 enacted into law by President James Madison authorized a vaccination agent to preserve genuine vaccine matter. The Act of Congress endorsed a provision for genuine vaccine matter to be circulated by postal mail distinguished by franking while registering an authenticity certificate or oath statement by governance of the Postal Service Act of 1792;

I, A.B. do swear (or affirm, as the case may be) that I will faithfully use my best exertions to preserve the genuine vaccine matter, and to furnish the same to the citizens of the United States; and also, that I will abstain from every thing prohibited in relation to the establishment of the post office of the United States.

- Vaccine Act of 1813
- Pub. L. 12–37, 2 Stat. 806
- February 27, 1813

The original Chesapeake Colonies solicited a vital 19th century medicine hindering the devastation of the variola virus. The American military forces could not burden the national security liabilities of a coastal viral epidemic reasonably considering the imminent Chesapeake campaign by the British Empire harmonized by the Battle of Baltimore as an addendum to the War of 1812.

== Career ==
The National Vaccine Institute was established in Baltimore City, Maryland as authorized by the Vaccine Act of 1813. Smith appointed as the United States vaccination agent provided accountability for the National Vaccine Institute as an endeavor to eradicate the vaccinia virus;

- Preservation of uniform smallpox vaccine for patient immunization
- Kinepox for any doctor or citizen requiring innocolation from a genus of orthopoxvirus
- Nationwide coordination of twenty vaccine agents who inoculated approximately 100,000 people from 1813 to 1822

In 1821, the National Vaccine Institute discovered an immunization physician in Tarboro, North Carolina conducted ten inoculations in the Tarboro settlement with the actual human pathogen – variola virus. Smith had unintentionally furnished bona fide smallpox matter by United States mail mistakenly in error for kinepox. In 1822, the 17th United States Congress repealed the Vaccine Act of 1813 debasing the medical practices of the National Vaccine Institute and United States Vaccine Agent.

== See also ==
- Diseases and epidemics of the 19th century
- List of diseases eliminated from the United States
- Smallpox virus retention debate
- Timeline of human vaccines

== Plenipotentiary letters regarding vaccine circulation during War of 1812 ==
- Smith, James (June 18, 1809). "To James Madison from James Smith, 18 June 1809". Founders Online. U.S. National Archives and Records Administration.
- Smith, James (February 26, 1813). "To James Madison from James Smith, 26 February 1813". Founders Online. U.S. National Archives and Records Administration.
- Birch, John (1817). "An Appeal to the Public on the Hazard and Peril of Vaccination, Otherwise Cow Pox". HathiTrust Digital Library. J. Harris. hdl:loc.gdc/scd0001.00025897341. LCCN 07032435. OCLC 1197647239.
- Smith, James (February 26, 1818). "Proposals to Furnish Vaccine Matter to Subscribers". James Madison Pamphlet Collection (Library of Congress). U.S. Library of Congress. hdl:loc.rbc/Madison.38594. LCCN 92838594.
- Smith, James (March 20, 1818). "General Vaccine Institution ~ Baltimore, Maryland" [Prospectus of a Permanent National Vaccine Institution, to be Established in the City of Washington, District of Columbia (Baltimore, 1818)]. James Madison Pamphlet Collection (Library of Congress). U.S. Library of Congress. hdl:loc.rbc/Madison.38595. LCCN 92838595. OCLC 14850382.
- Smith, James (March 28, 1818). "James Smith (of Baltimore) to Thomas Jefferson, 28 March 1818". Founders Online. U.S. National Archives and Records Administration.
- Smith, James (March 28, 1818). "To John Adams from James Smith, 28 March 1818". Founders Online. U.S. National Archives and Records Administration.
- "Report of the Select Committee to which was referred, the Memorial of Dr. James Smith, Accompanied with a Bill to Encourage Vaccination ~ H. Rept. 18-78" (PDF). GovInfo.gov. U.S. Government Printing Office. March 4, 1824. hdl:loc.law/llserialsetce.00105_00_00-079-0078-0000. LCCN 2024761878.

== Biographical sketch of Smith ==
- "James Smith". Medicine in Maryland, 1752-1920 ~ Maryland History Online. University of Maryland, Baltimore County ~ Maryland State Archives.
- "Dr. James Smith". American Art Exhibition Guide ~ Rembrandt Peale. Baltimore Museum of Art.
