= History of smallpox =

The history of smallpox extends into pre-history. Genetic evidence suggests that the smallpox virus emerged 3,000 to 4,000 years ago. Prior to that, similar ancestral viruses circulated, but possibly only in other mammals, and possibly with different symptoms. Only a few written reports dating from about 500–1000 CE are considered reliable historical descriptions of smallpox, so understanding of the disease prior to that has relied on genetics and archaeology. However, during the second millennium, especially starting in the 16th century, reliable written reports become more common. The earliest physical evidence of smallpox is found in the Egyptian mummies of people who died some 3,000 years ago. Smallpox has had a major impact on world history, not least because indigenous populations of regions where smallpox was non-native, such as the Americas and Australia, were rapidly and greatly reduced by smallpox (along with other introduced diseases) during periods of initial foreign contact, which helped pave the way for conquest and colonization. During the 18th century, the disease killed an estimated 400,000 Europeans each year, including five reigning monarchs, and was responsible for a third of all blindness. Between 20 and 60% of all those infected—and over 80% of infected children—died from the disease.

During the 20th century, it is estimated that smallpox was responsible for 250–500 million deaths. In the early 1950s, an estimated 50 million cases of smallpox occurred in the world each year. As recently as 1967, the World Health Organization estimated that 15 million people contracted the disease and that two million died in that year. After successful vaccination campaigns throughout the 19th and 20th centuries, the WHO certified the global eradication of smallpox in May 1980. Smallpox is one of two infectious diseases to have been eradicated, the other being rinderpest, which was declared eradicated in 2011.

== Eurasian epidemics ==
It has been suggested that smallpox was a major component of the Plague of Athens that occurred in 430 BCE, during the Peloponnesian Wars, and was described by Thucydides.

Galen's description of the Antonine Plague, which swept through the Roman Empire in 165–180 CE, indicates that it was probably caused by smallpox. Returning soldiers picked up the disease in Seleucia (in modern Iraq), and brought it home with them to Syria and Italy. It raged for fifteen years and greatly weakened the Roman empire, killing up to one-third of the population in some areas. Total deaths have been estimated at 5 million.

A second major outbreak of disease in the Roman Empire, known as the Plague of Cyprian (251–266 CE), was also either smallpox or measles. The Roman empire stopped growing as a consequence of these two plagues, according to historians such as Theodore Mommsen. Although some historians believe that many historical epidemics and pandemics were early outbreaks of smallpox, contemporary records are not detailed enough to make a definite diagnosis. The discovery of smallpox-related osteomyelitis on a skeleton buried at Corinium in the late 3rd century confirms the presence of the disease in the Roman world around this time, though not its ubiquity.

Written sometime before 400 AD, the Indian medical book Sushruta Samhita recorded a disease marked by pustules and boils, saying "the pustules are red, yellow, and white and they are accompanied by burning pain … the skin seems studded with grains of rice." The Indian epidemic was thought to be punishment from a god, and the survivors created a goddess, Sitala, as the anthropomorphic personification of the disease. Smallpox was thus regarded as possession by Sitala. In Hinduism the goddess Sitala both causes and cures high fever, rashes, hot flashes and pustules. All of these are symptoms of smallpox.

Most of the details about the epidemics are lost, probably due to the scarcity of surviving written records from the Early Middle Ages. The first incontrovertible description of smallpox in Western Europe occurred in 581 AD, when Bishop Gregory of Tours provided an eyewitness account describing the characteristic symptoms of smallpox. Waves of epidemics wiped out large rural populations.

In 710 AD, smallpox was re-introduced into Europe via Iberia by the Umayyad conquest of Hispania.

The Japanese smallpox epidemic of 735–737 is believed to have killed as much as one-third of Japan's population.

There is evidence that smallpox reached the Philippines from the 4th century onwards possibly from indirect trade with Indians.

During the 18th century, there were many major outbreaks of smallpox, driven possibly by increasing contact with European colonists and traders. There were epidemics, for instance, in the Sultanate of Banjar (South Kalimantan), in 1734, 1750–51, 1764–65 and 1778–79; in the Sultanate of Tidore (Moluccas ) during the 1720s, and in southern Sumatra during the 1750s, the 1770s and in 1786.

The clearest description of smallpox from pre-modern times was given in the 9th century by the Persian physician, Muhammad ibn Zakariya ar-Razi, known in the West as "Rhazes", who was the first to differentiate smallpox from measles and chickenpox in his Kitab fi al-jadari wa-al-hasbah (The Book of Smallpox and Measles).

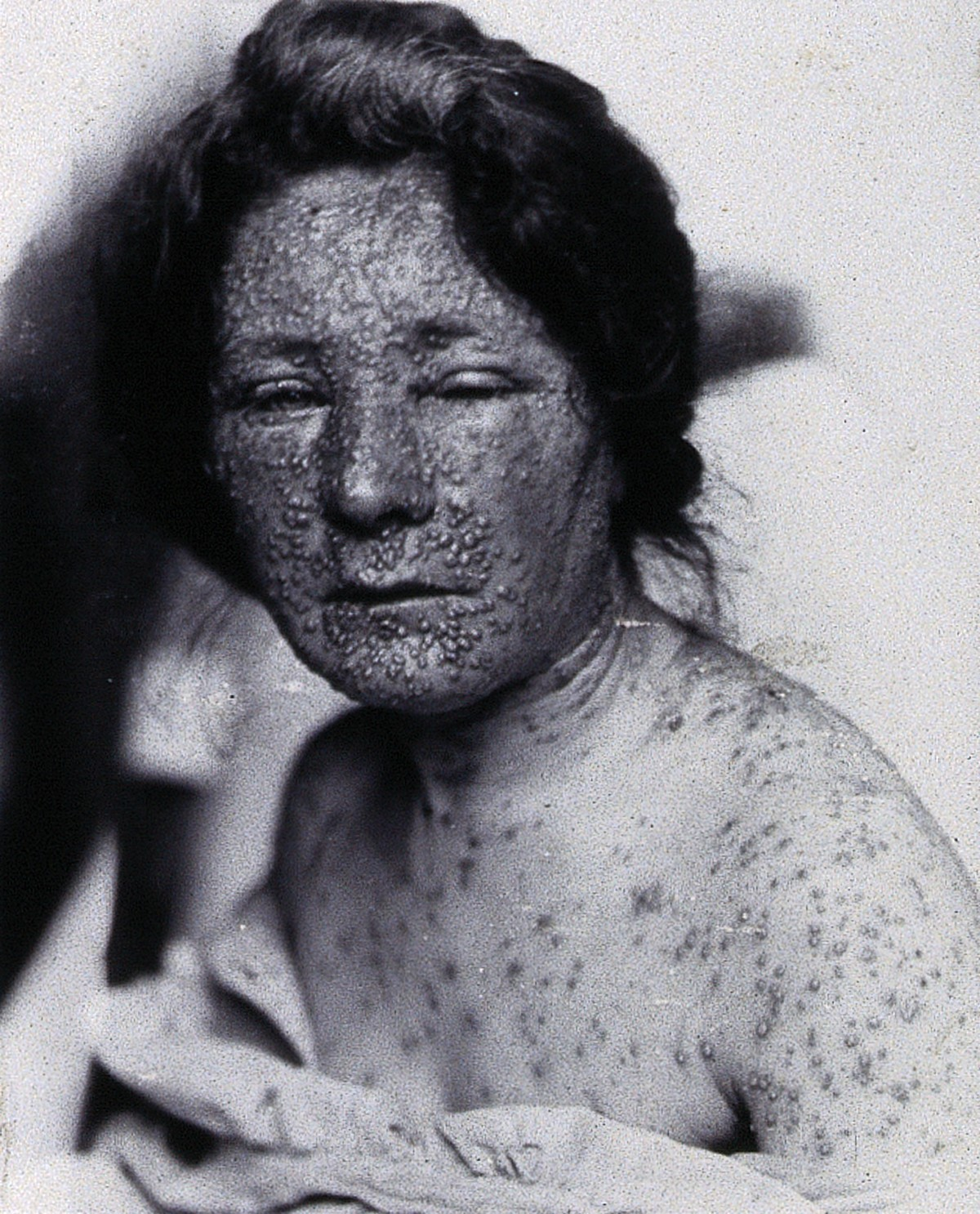
Female smallpox patient in London, c. 1890

Smallpox was a leading cause of death in the 18th century. Every seventh child born in Russia died from smallpox. It killed an estimated 400,000 Europeans each year in the 18th century, including five reigning European monarchs. Most people became infected during their lifetimes, and about 30% of people infected with smallpox died from the disease, presenting a severe selection pressure on the resistant survivors.

In northern Japan, Ainu population decreased drastically in the 19th century, due in large part to infectious diseases like smallpox brought by Japanese settlers pouring into Hokkaido.

The Franco-Prussian War triggered a smallpox pandemic of 1870–1875 that claimed 500,000 lives; while vaccination was mandatory in the Prussian army, many French soldiers were not vaccinated. Smallpox outbreaks among French prisoners of war spread to the German civilian population and other parts of Europe. Ultimately, this public health disaster inspired stricter legislation in Germany and England, though not in France.

In 1849 nearly 13% of all Calcutta deaths were due to smallpox. Between 1868 and 1907, there were approximately 4.7 million deaths from smallpox in India. Between 1926 and 1930, there were 979,738 cases of smallpox with a mortality of 42.3%.

== African epidemics ==
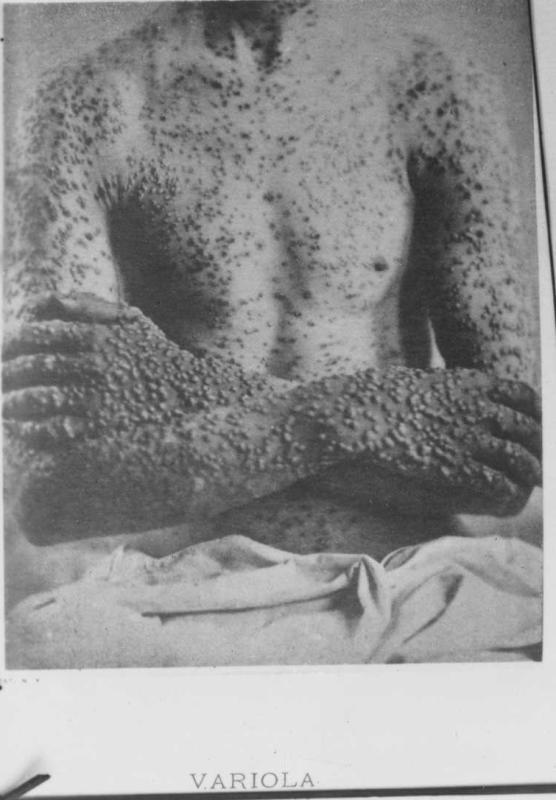
Variola lesions on chest and arms

One of the oldest records of what may have been an encounter with smallpox in Africa is associated with the elephant war circa AD 568 CE, when after fighting a siege in Mecca, Ethiopian troops contracted the disease which they carried with them back to Africa.

Arab ports in Coastal towns in Africa likely contributed to the importation of smallpox into Africa, as early as the 13th century, though no records exist until the 16th century. Upon invasion of these towns by tribes in the interior of Africa, a severe epidemic affected all African inhabitants while sparing the Portuguese. Densely populated areas of Africa connected to the Mediterranean, Nubia and Ethiopia by caravan route likely were affected by smallpox since the 11th century, though written records do not appear until the introduction of the slave trade in the 16th century.

The enslavement of Africans continued to spread smallpox to the entire continent, with raiders pushing farther inland along caravan routes in search of people to enslave. The effects of smallpox could be seen along caravan routes, and those who were not affected along the routes were still likely to become infected either waiting to be put onboard or on board ships.

Smallpox in Angola was likely introduced shortly after Portuguese settlement of the area in 1484. The 1864 epidemic killed 25,000 inhabitants, one third of the total population in that same area. In 1713, an outbreak occurred in South Africa after a ship from India docked at Cape Town, bringing infected laundry ashore. Many of the settler European population suffered, and whole clans of the Khoisan people were wiped out. A second outbreak occurred in 1755, again affecting both the white population and the Khoisan. The disease spread further, completely eradicating several Khoisan clans, all the way to the Kalahari desert. A third outbreak in 1767 similarly affected the Khoisan and Bantu peoples. But the European colonial settlers were not affected nearly to the extent that they were in the first two outbreaks, it has been speculated this is because of variolation. Continued enslavement operations brought smallpox to Cape Town again in 1840, taking the lives of 2500 people, and then to Uganda in the 1840s. It is estimated that up to eighty percent of the Griqua tribe was exterminated by smallpox in 1831, and whole tribes were being wiped out in Kenya up until 1899. Along the Zaire river basin were areas where no one survived the epidemics, leaving the land devoid of human life. In Ethiopia and the Sudan, six epidemics are recorded for the 19th century: 1811–1813, 1838–1839, 1865–1866, 1878–1879, 1885–1887, and 1889–1890.

== Epidemics in the Americas ==
Documented smallpox epidemics in the New World
Year	Location	Description
1520–1527	Mexico, Central America, South America	Smallpox kills 5–8 millions of native inhabitants of Mexico. Unintentionally introduced at Veracruz with the arrival of Panfilo de Narvaez on April 23, 1520, and was credited with the victory of Cortes over the Aztec empire at Tenochtitlan (present-day Mexico City) in 1521. Kills the Inca ruler, Huayna Capac, and 200,000 others and weakens the Incan Empire.
1561–1562	Chile	No precise numbers on deaths exist in contemporary records but it is estimated that natives lost 20 to 25 percent of their population. According to Alonso de Góngora Marmolejo, so many Indian laborers died that the Spanish gold mines had to shut down.
1588–1591	Central Chile	A combined smallpox, measles and typhus plague strikes Central Chile contributing to a decline of indigenous populations.
1617–1619	North America northern east coast	Killed 90% of the Massachusetts Bay Indians
1655	Chillán, Central Chile	An outbreak of smallpox occurred among refugees from Chillán as the city was evacuated amidst the Mapuche uprising of 1655. Spanish authorities put this group in effective quarantine decreeing death sentences for anyone crossing Maule River north.
1674	Cherokee Tribe	Death count unknown. Population in 1674 about 50,000. After 1729, 1738, and 1753 smallpox epidemics their population was only 25,000 when they were forced to Oklahoma on the Trail Of Tears.
1692	Boston, MA	
1702–1703	St. Lawrence Valley, NY	
1721	Boston, MA	A British sailor disembarking HMS Seahorse brought smallpox to Boston. 5759 people were infected and 844 died.
1736	Pennsylvania	
1738	South Carolina	
1770s	West Coast of North America	1770s Pacific Northwest smallpox epidemic At least 30% (tens of thousands) of the Northwestern Native Americans die from smallpox.
1781–1783	Great Lakes	
1830s	Alaska	Reduced Dena'ina Athabaskan population in Cook Inlet region of southcentral Alaska by half. Smallpox also devastated Yup'ik populations in western Alaska.
1836–1840	Great Plains	1837 Great Plains smallpox epidemic
1860–1861	Pennsylvania	
1862	British Columbia, Washington state & Russian America	Known as the Great Smallpox of 1862, an outbreak of smallpox in a large encampment of all indigenous peoples from around the colony on June 10, 1862, dispersed by order of the government to return to their homes, resulted in the deaths of 50–90% of the indigenous peoples in the region
1865–1873	Philadelphia, PA, New York, Boston, MA and New Orleans, LA	Same period of time, in Washington D.C., Baltimore, MD, Memphis, TN, Cholera and a series of recurring epidemics of Typhus, Scarlet Fever and Yellow Fever
1869	Araucanía, southern Chile	A smallpox epidemic breaks out among native Mapuches, just some months after a destructive Chilean military campaign in Araucanía.
1877	Los Angeles, CA	
1880	Tacna, Peru	Tacna hosted the combined armies of Peru and Bolivia before being defeated by Chile in the Battle of Tacna. Before it fell to Chileans in late May 1880 infectious diseases were widespread in the city with 461 deaths of smallpox in the 1879–1880 period, making up 11.3% of all registered deaths for the city in the same period.
1885	Montréal, Québec	3164 dead in Montréal (municipality), 5864 for the whole province of Québec. (fr) Smallpox in Montréal in 1885
1902	Boston, Massachusetts	Of the 1,596 cases reported in this epidemic, 270 died.
1905	Southern Patagonia, Chile	A smallpox epidemic hits Tehuelche communities in Magallanes Territory, Chile. Cacique José Mulato died in the epidemic.

After first contacts with Europeans and Africans, some believe that the death of 90–95% of the native population of the New World was caused by Old World diseases. It is suspected that smallpox was the chief culprit and responsible for killing nearly all of the native inhabitants of the Americas. For more than 200 years, this disease affected all new world populations, mostly without intentional European transmission, from contact in the early 16th century until possibly as late as the French and Indian Wars (1754–1767).

In 1519 Hernán Cortés landed on the shores of what is now Mexico and what was then the Aztec Empire. In 1520 another group of Spanish arrived in Mexico from Hispaniola, bringing with them the smallpox which had already been ravaging that island for two years. When Cortés heard about the other group, he went and defeated them. In this contact, one of Cortés's men contracted the disease. When Cortés returned to Tenochtitlan, he brought the disease with him.

Soon, the Aztecs rose up in rebellion against Cortés and his men. Outnumbered, the Spanish were forced to flee. In the fighting, the Spanish soldier carrying smallpox died. Cortés would not return to the capital until August 1521. In the meantime smallpox devastated the Aztec population. It killed most of the Aztec army and 25% of the overall population. The Spanish Franciscan Motolinia left this description: "As the Indians did not know the remedy of the disease…they died in heaps, like bedbugs. In many places it happened that everyone in a house died and, as it was impossible to bury the great number of dead, they pulled down the houses over them so that their homes become their tombs." On Cortés's return, he found the Aztec army's chain of command in ruins. The soldiers who still lived were weak from the disease. Cortés then easily defeated the Aztecs and entered Tenochtitlán. The Spaniards said that they could not walk through the streets without stepping on the bodies of smallpox victims.

The effects of smallpox on Tahuantinsuyu (or the Inca empire) were even more devastating. Beginning in Colombia, smallpox spread rapidly before the Spanish invaders first arrived in the empire. The spread was probably aided by the efficient Inca road system. Within months, the disease had killed the Incan Emperor Huayna Capac, his successor, and most of the other leaders. Two of his surviving sons warred for power and, after a bloody and costly war, Atahualpa become the new emperor. As Atahualpa was returning to the capital Cuzco, Francisco Pizarro arrived and through a series of deceits captured the young leader and his best general. Within a few years smallpox claimed between 60% and 90% of the Inca population, with other waves of European disease weakening them further. A handful of historians argue that a disease called Bartonellosis might have been responsible for some outbreaks of illness, but this opinion is in the scholarly minority. The effects of Bartonellosis were depicted in the ceramics of the Moche people of ancient Peru.

Even after the two largest empires of the Americas were defeated by the virus and disease, smallpox continued its march of death. In 1561, smallpox reached Chile by sea, when a ship carrying the new governor Francisco de Villagra landed at La Serena. Chile had previously been isolated by the Atacama Desert and Andes Mountains from Peru, but at the end of 1561 and in early 1562, it ravaged the Chilean native population. Chronicles and records of the time left no accurate data on mortality but more recent estimates are that the natives lost 20 to 25 percent of their population. The Spanish historian Marmolejo said that gold mines had to shut down when all their Indian labor died. Mapuche fighting Spain in Araucanía regarded the epidemic as a magical attempt by Francisco de Villagra to exterminate them because he could not defeat them in the Arauco War.

In 1633 in Plymouth, Massachusetts, the Native Americans were struck by the virus. As it had done elsewhere, the virus wiped out entire population groups of Native Americans. It reached Mohawks in 1634, the Lake Ontario area in 1636, and the lands of the Iroquois by 1679.

A particularly virulent sequence of smallpox outbreaks took place in Boston, Massachusetts. From 1636 to 1698, Boston endured six epidemics. In 1721, the most severe epidemic occurred. The entire population fled the city, bringing the virus to the rest of the Thirteen Colonies.

During the siege of Fort Pitt, as recorded in his journal by sundries trader and militia Captain, William Trent, on June 24, 1763, dignitaries from the Delaware tribe met with Fort Pitt officials, warned them of "great numbers of Indians" coming to attack the fort, and pleaded with them to leave the fort while there was still time. The commander of the fort refused to abandon the fort. Instead, the British gave as gifts two blankets, one silk handkerchief and one linen from the smallpox hospital, to two Delaware Indian delegates. The dignitaries were met again later and they seemingly hadn't contracted smallpox. A relatively small outbreak of smallpox had begun spreading earlier that spring, with a hundred dying from it among Native American tribes in the Ohio Valley and Great Lakes area through 1763 and 1764. The effectiveness of the biological warfare itself remains unknown, and the method used is inefficient compared to respiratory transmission and these attempts to spread the disease are difficult to differentiate from epidemics occurring from previous contacts with colonists, as smallpox outbreaks happened every dozen or so years.

In the late 1770s, during the American Revolutionary War, smallpox returned once more and killed thousands. Peter Kalm in his Travels in North America, described how in that period, the dying Indian villages became overrun with wolves feasting on the corpses and weakened survivors. During the 1770s, smallpox killed at least 30% of the Northwestern Native Americans, killing tens of thousands. The smallpox epidemic of 1780–1782 brought devastation and drastic depopulation among the Plains Indians. This epidemic is a classic instance of European immunity and non-European vulnerability. It is probable that the Indians contracted the disease from the 'Snake Indians' on the Mississippi. From there it spread eastward and northward to the Saskatchewan River. According to David Thompson's account, the first to hear of the disease were fur traders from the Hudson's House on October 15, 1781. A week later, reports were made to William Walker and William Tomison, who were in charge of the Hudson and Cumberland Hudson's Bay Company posts. By February, the disease spread as far as the Basquia Tribe. Smallpox attacked whole tribes and left few survivors. E. E. Rich described the epidemic by saying that "Families lay unburied in their tents while the few survivors fled, to spread the disease." After reading Tomison's journals, Houston and Houston calculated that, of the Indians who traded at the Hudson and Cumberland houses, 95% died of smallpox. Paul Hackett adds to the mortality numbers suggesting that perhaps up to one-half to three-quarters of the Ojibway situated west of the Grand Portage died from the disease. The Cree also suffered a casualty rate of approximately 75% with similar effects found in the Lowland Cree. By 1785 the Sioux Indians of the great plains had also been affected. Not only did smallpox devastate the Indian population, it did so in an unforgiving way. William Walker described the epidemic stating that "the Indians [are] all Dying by this Distemper … lying Dead about the Barren Ground like a rotten sheep, their Tents left standing & the Wild beast Devouring them."

In 1799, the physician Valentine Seaman administered the first smallpox vaccine in the United States. He gave his children a smallpox vaccination using a serum acquired from Edward Jenner, the British physician who invented the vaccine from fluid taken from cowpox lesions. Though vaccines were misunderstood and mistrusted at the time, Seaman advocated their use and, in 1802, coordinated a free vaccination program for the poor in New York City.

By 1832, the federal government of the United States established a smallpox vaccination program for Native Americans.

In 1900 starting in New York City, smallpox reared its head once again and started a sociopolitical battle with lines drawn between the rich and poor, white and black. In populations of railroad and migrant workers who traveled from city to city the disease had reached an endemic low boil. This fact did not bother the government at the time, nor did it spur them to action. Despite the general acceptance of the germ theory of disease, pioneered by John Snow in 1849, smallpox was still thought to be mostly a malady that followed the less-distinct guidelines of a "filth" disease, and therefore would only affect the "lower classes".

The last major smallpox epidemic in the United States occurred in Boston, Massachusetts throughout a three-year period, between 1901 and 1903. During this three-year period, 1596 cases of the disease occurred throughout the city. Of those cases, nearly 300 people died. As a whole, the epidemic had a 17% fatality rate.

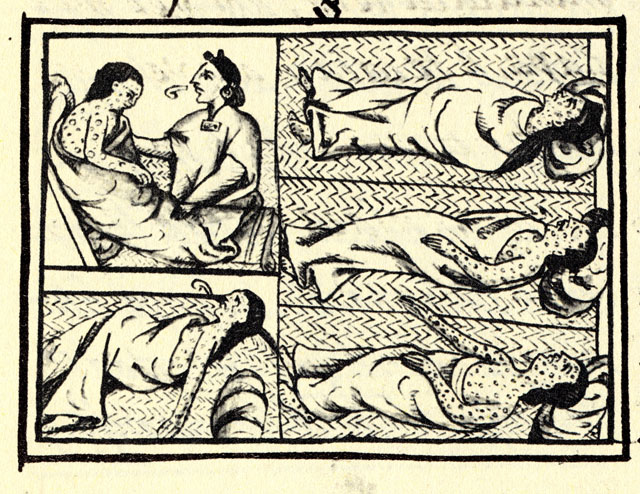
Indigenous victims (likely smallpox), Florentine Codex (compiled 1540–1585)

Those who were infected with the disease were detained in quarantine facilities in the hopes of protecting others from getting sick. These quarantine facilities, or pesthouses, were mostly located on Southampton Street. As the outbreak worsened, men were also moved to hospitals on Gallop's Island. Women and children were primarily sent to Southampton Street. Smallpox patients were not allowed in regular hospital facilities throughout the city, for fear the sickness would spread among the already sick.

A reflection of the previous outbreak that occurred in New York, the poor and homeless were blamed for the sickness's spread. In response to this belief, the city instructed teams of physicians to vaccinate anyone living in inexpensive housing.

In an effort to control the outbreak, the Boston Board of Health began voluntary vaccination programs. Individuals could receive free vaccines at their workplaces or at different stations set up throughout the city. By the end of 1901, some 40,000 of the city's residents had received a smallpox vaccine. However, despite the city's efforts, the epidemic continued to grow. In January 1902, a door-to-door vaccination program was initiated. Health officials were instructed to compel individuals to receive vaccination, pay a $5 fine, or face 15 days in prison. This door-to-door program was met by some resistance as some individuals feared the vaccines to be unsafe and ineffective. Others felt compulsory vaccination in itself was a problem that violated an individual's civil liberties.

This program of compulsory vaccination eventually led to the famous Jacobson v. Massachusetts case. The case was the result of a Cambridge resident's refusal to be vaccinated. Henning Jacobson, a Swedish immigrant, refused vaccination out of fear it would cause him illness. He claimed a previous smallpox vaccine had made him sick as a child. Rather than pay the five dollar fine, he challenged the state's authority on forcing people to receive vaccination. His case was lost at the state level, but Jacobson appealed the ruling, and so, the case was taken up by the Supreme Court. In 1905 the Supreme Court upheld the Massachusetts law: it was ruled Jacobson could not refuse the mandatory vaccination.

In Canada, between 1702 and 1703, nearly a quarter of the population of Quebec city died due to a smallpox epidemic.

== Pacific epidemics ==
=== Australia ===
Smallpox was brought to Australia in the 18th century. The first recorded outbreak, in April 1789, about 16 months after the arrival of the First Fleet, devastated the Aboriginal population. Governor Arthur Phillip said that about half of the Aboriginal people living around Sydney Cove died during the outbreak. Some later estimates have been higher, though precise figures are hard to determine, and Professors Carmody and Hunter argued in 2014 that the figure was more like 30%. There is an ongoing debate, with links to the "history wars", concerning two main rival theories about how smallpox first entered the continent. (Another hypothesis suggested that the French brought it in 1788, but the timeline does not fit.) The central hypotheses of these theories suggest that smallpox was transmitted to Indigenous Australians by either:

- the First Fleet of British settlers to arrive in the Colony of New South Wales, who arrived in January 1788 (whether deliberately or accidentally); or
- Makassan mariners visiting northern Australia.

In 1914, Dr J. H. L. Cumpston, director of the Australian Quarantine Service tentatively put forward the hypothesis that smallpox arrived with British settlers. Cumpston's theory was most forcefully reiterated by the economic historian Noel Butlin, in his book Our Original Aggression (1983). Likewise David Day, in Claiming a Continent: A New History of Australia (2001), suggested that members of Sydney's garrison of Royal Marines may have attempted to use smallpox as a biological weapon in 1789. However, in 2002, historian John Connor stated that Day's theory was "unsustainable". That same year, theories that smallpox was introduced with settlers, deliberately or otherwise, were contested in a full-length book by historian Judy Campbell: Invisible Invaders: Smallpox and Other Diseases in Aboriginal Australia 1780–1880 (2002). Campbell consulted, during the writing of her book, Frank Fenner, who had overseen the final stages of a successful campaign by the World Health Organization (WHO) to eradicate smallpox. Campbell argued that scientific evidence concerning the viability of variolous matter (used for inoculation) did not support the possibility of the disease being brought to Australia on the long voyage from Europe. Campbell also noted that there was no evidence of Aboriginal people ever having been exposed to the variolous matter, merely speculation that they may have been. Later authors, such as Christopher Warren, and Craig Mear continued to argue that smallpox emanated from the importation of variolous matter on the First Fleet. Warren (2007) suggested that Campbell had erred in assuming that high temperatures would have sterilised the British supply of smallpox. H. A. Willis (2010), in a survey of the literature discussed above, endorsed Campbell's argument. In response, Warren (2011) suggested that Willis had not taken into account research on how heat affects the smallpox virus, cited by the WHO. Willis (2011) replied that his position was supported by a closer reading of Frank Fenner's report to the WHO (1988) and invited readers to consult that report online.

The rival hypothesis, that the 1789 outbreak was introduced to Australia by visitors from Makassar, came to prominence in 2002, with Judy Campbell's book Invisible Invaders. Campbell expanded upon the opinion of C. C. Macknight (1986), an authority on the interaction between indigenous Australians and Makassans. Citing the scientific opinion of Fenner (who wrote the foreword to her book) and historical documents, Campbell argued that the 1789 outbreak was introduced to Australia by Makassans, from where it spread overland. Nevertheless, Michael Bennett in a 2009 article in Bulletin of the History of Medicine, argued that imported "variolous matter" may have been the source of the 1789 epidemic in Australia. In 2011, Macknight re-entered the debate, declaring: "The overwhelming probability must be that it [smallpox] was introduced, like the later epidemics, by [Makassan] trepangers on the north coast and spread across the continent to arrive in Sydney quite independently of the new settlement there". Warren (2013) disputed this, on the grounds that: there was no suitable smallpox in Makassar before 1789; there were no trade routes suitable for transmission to Port Jackson; the theory of a Makassan source for smallpox in 1789 was contradicted by Aboriginal oral tradition; and, the earliest point at which there was evidence of smallpox entering Australia with Makassan visitors was around 1824. Public health expert Mark Wenitong, a Kabi Kabi man, and John Maynard, Emeritus professor of Aboriginal History at the University of Newcastle agree that this is highly unlikely, with the added obstacle of very low population density between the north coast and Sydney Cove.

A quite separate third theory, endorsed by the pathologist Dr G. E. Ford, with support from the academics Curson, Wright and Hunter, holds that the deadly disease was not smallpox but the far more infectious chickenpox, to which the Eora Aboriginal peoples had no resistance. John Carmody, then at the University of Sydney School of Medical Sciences, suggested in 2010 that the epidemic was far more likely to have been chickenpox, as none of the European colonists were threatened by it, as he would have expected to happen. However Wenitong and Maynard continue to believe that there is strong evidence that it was smallpox.

Another major outbreak was observed in 1828–1830, near Bathurst, New South Wales. A third epidemic occurred in the Northern Territory and northern Western Australia from the mid-1860s, until at least 1870.

=== Polynesia ===
Elsewhere in the Pacific, smallpox killed many indigenous Polynesians. Nevertheless, Alfred Crosby, in his major work, Ecological Imperialism: The Biological Expansion of Europe, 900-1900 (1986) showed that in 1840 a ship with smallpox on it was successfully quarantined, preventing an epidemic amongst Māori of New Zealand. The only major outbreak in New Zealand was a 1913 epidemic, which affected Māori in northern New Zealand and nearly wiped out the Rapa Nui of Easter Island (Rapa Nui), was reported by Te Rangi Hiroa (Dr Peter Buck) to a medical congress in Melbourne in 1914.

=== Micronesia ===
The whaler ship Delta brought smallpox to the Micronesian island of Pohnpei on 28 February 1854. The Pohnpeians reacted by first feasting their offended spirits and then resorted hiding. The disease eventually wiped out more than half the island's population. The deaths of chiefs threw Pohnpeian society into disarray, and the people started blaming the God of the Christian missionaries. The Christian missionaries themselves saw the epidemic as God's punishment for the people and offered the natives inoculations, though often withheld such treatment from the priests. The epidemic abated in October 1854.

== Eradication ==
Early in history, it was observed that those who had contracted smallpox once were never struck by the disease again. Thought to have been discovered by accident, it became known that those who contracted smallpox through a break in the skin in which smallpox matter was inserted received a less severe reaction than those who contracted it naturally. This realization led to the practice of purposely infecting people with matter from smallpox scabs in order to protect them later from a more severe reaction. This practice, known today as variolation, was first practiced in China in the 10th century. Methods of carrying out the procedure varied depending upon location. Variolation was the sole method of protection against smallpox other than quarantine until Edward Jenner's discovery of the inoculating abilities of cowpox against the smallpox virus in 1796. Efforts to protect populations against smallpox by way of vaccination followed for centuries after Jenner's discovery. It is thought that smallpox has been eradicated since 1979.

=== Variolation ===
The word variolation is synonymous with inoculation, insertion, en-grafting, or transplantation. The term is used to define insertion of smallpox matter, and distinguishes this procedure from vaccination, where cowpox matter was used to obtain a much milder reaction among patients.

==== Asia ====
The practice of variolation (also known as inoculation) first came out of East Asia. FThe first clear reference to smallpox inoculation was made by the Chinese author Wan Quan (1499–1582) in his Dòuzhěn xīnfǎ (Chinese: 痘疹心法; lit. 'Pox Rash Teachings') published in 1549, with earliest hints of the practice in China during the 10th century. In China, the technique did have a 0.5–2.0% mortality rate, but that was considerably less than the 20–30% mortality rate of the disease itself. Two reports on the Chinese practice of inoculation were received by the Royal Society in London in 1700: one by Dr. Martin Lister who received a report by an employee of the East India Company stationed in China and another by Clopton Havers. Voltaire (1742) reports that the Chinese had practiced smallpox inoculation "these hundred years". Scabs from smallpox victims who had the disease in its mild form would be selected, and the powder was kept close to body temperature by means of keeping it close to the chest, killing the majority of the virus and resulting in a more mild case of smallpox. Scabs were generally used when a month old, but could be used more quickly in hot weather (15–20 days), and slower in winter (50 days). The process was carried out by taking eight smallpox scabs and crushing them in a mortar with two grains of Uvularia grandiflora in a mortar. The powder was administered nasally through a silver tube that was curved at its point, through the right nostril for boys and the left nostril for girls. A week after the procedure, those variolated would start to produce symptoms of smallpox, and recovery was guaranteed. In India, where the European colonizers came across variolation in the 17th century, a large, sharp needle was dipped into the pus collected from mature smallpox sores. Several punctures with this needle were made either below the deltoid muscle or in the forehead, and then were covered with a paste made from boiled rice. However, the practice of variolation in ancient India has been disputed. The original ancient text describing this method has not been found. The method or practice of variolation has not yet been discovered in any Sanskrit or vernacular treatise.Since the claim that it was an ancient practice in India has been rejected, there is no reason to assume that it began there. The rumor that vaccination was documented in India before the discoveries of Edward Jenner, widespread since the nineteenth century, can be traced to propaganda tracts written in Sanskrit and the Indian vernaculars by colonial officers, designed to convince pious Indians to accept the newly discovered Jennerian procedure and abandon older variolation practices.

==== Mauritius ====
In 1792 a slave-ship arrived on the French Indian Ocean island of Île de France (Mauritius) from South India, bringing with it smallpox. As the epidemic spread, a heated debate ensued over the practice of inoculation. The island was in the throes of revolutionary politics and the community of French colonists were acutely aware of their new rights as 'citizens'. In the course of the smallpox epidemic, many of the political tensions the period came to focus on the question of inoculation, and were played out on the bodies of slaves. Whilst some citizens asserted their right, as property owners, to inoculate the slaves, others, equally vehemently, objected to the practice and asserted their right to protect their slaves from infection. Eighteenth-century colonial medicine was largely geared to keeping the bodies of slaves and workers productive and useful, but formal medicine never had a monopoly. Slaves on Île de France brought with them a rich array of medical beliefs and practices from Africa, India, and Madagascar. We have little direct historical evidence for these, but we do know that many slaves came from areas in which forms of smallpox inoculation were known and practiced.

==== Europe ====
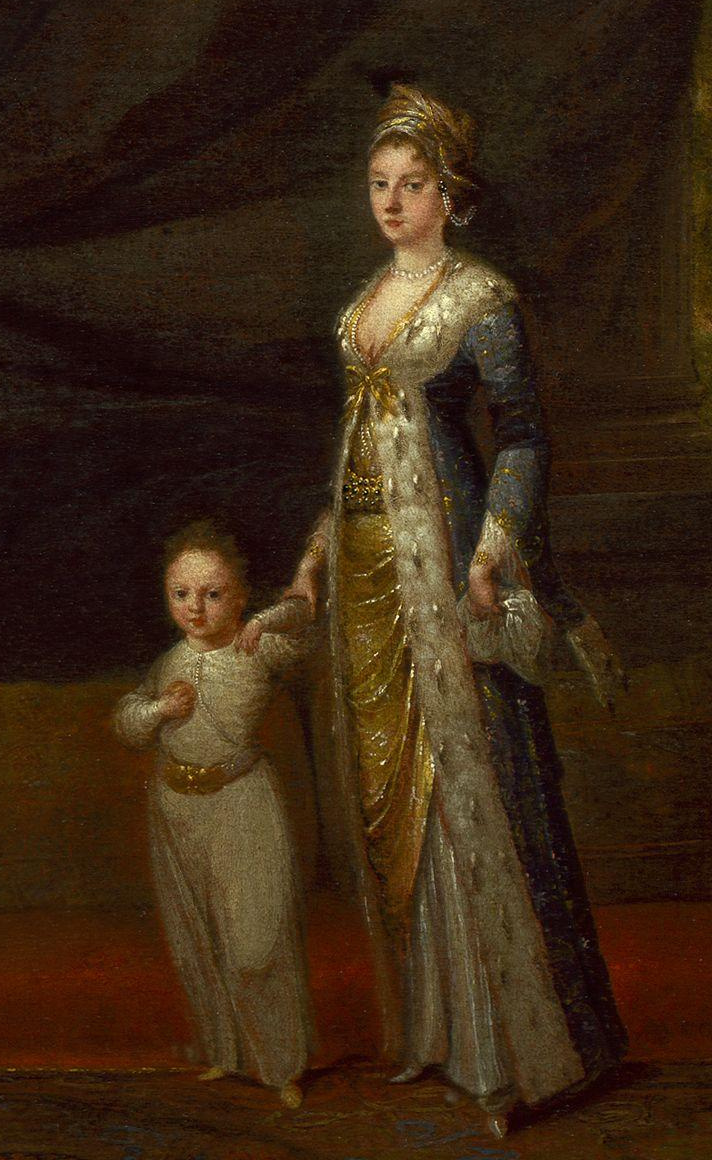
Lady Mary Wortley Montagu with her son, Edward Wortley Montagu, who was variolated in March, 1718 by Dr. Charles Maitland

In 1713, Lady Mary Wortley Montagu's brother died of smallpox; she too contracted the virus two years later at the age of twenty-six, leaving her badly scarred. When her husband was made ambassador to Ottoman Empire, she accompanied him to Constantinople. It was here that Lady Mary first came upon variolation. Two Greek women made it their business to engraft people with pox that left them un-scarred and unable to catch the pox again. In a letter, she wrote that she intended to have her own son undergo the process and would try to bring variolation into fashion in England. Her son underwent the procedure, which was performed by Charles Maitland, and survived with no ill effects. When an epidemic broke out in London following her return, Lady Mary wanted to protect her daughter from the virus by having her variolated as well. Maitland performed the procedure, which was a success. The story made it to the newspapers and was a topic for discussion in London salons. Princess Caroline of Wales wanted her children variolated as well but first wanted more validation of the operation. She had both an orphanage and several convicts variolated before she was convinced. When the operation, performed by the King's surgeon, Claudius Amyand, and overseen by Maitland, was a success, variolation got the royal seal of approval and the practice became widespread. When the practice of variolation set off local epidemics and caused death in two cases, public reaction was severe. Minister Edmund Massey, in 1772, called variolation dangerous and sinful, saying that people should handle the disease as the biblical figure Job did with his own tribulations, without interfering with God's test for mankind. Lady Mary still worked at promoting variolation but its practice waned until 1743.

Robert and Daniel Sutton further revived the practice of variolation in England by advertising their perfect variolation record, maintained by selecting patients who were healthy when variolated and were cared for during the procedure in the Sutton's own hygienic hospital. Other changes that the Suttons made to carrying out the variolation process include reducing and later abolishing the preparatory period before variolation was carried out, making more shallow incisions to distribute the smallpox matter, using smallpox matter collected on the fourth day of the disease, where the pus taken was still clear, and recommending that those inoculated get fresh air during recovery. The introduction of the shallower incision reduced both complications associated with the procedure and the severity of the reaction. The prescription of fresh air caused controversy about Sutton's method and how effective it was in reality when those inoculated could walk about and spread the disease to those that had never before experienced smallpox. It was the Suttons who introduced the idea of mass variolation of an area when an epidemic broke out as means of protection to the inhabitants in that location.

News of variolation spread to the royal families of Europe. Several royal families had themselves variolated by English physicians claiming to be specialists. Recipients include the family of Louis XV following his own death of smallpox, and Catherine the Great, whose husband had been horribly disfigured by the disease. Catherine the Great was variolated by Thomas Dimsdale, who followed Sutton's method of inoculation. In France, the practice was sanctioned until an epidemic was traced back to an inoculation. After this instance, variolation was banned within city limits. These conditions caused physicians to move just outside the cities and continue to practice variolation in the suburbs.

===== Edward Jenner =====
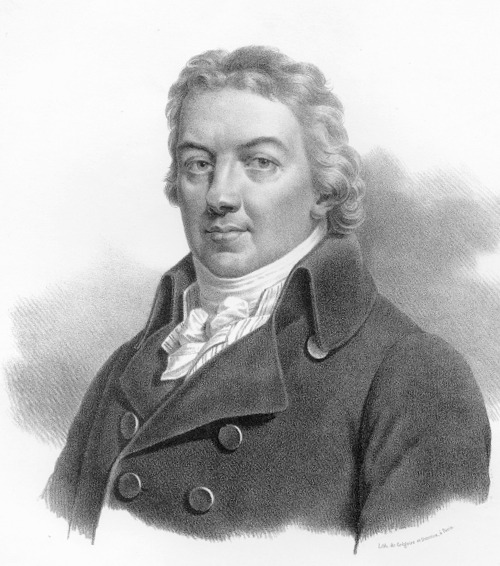
Edward Jenner (1749–1823)

Edward Jenner was variolated in 1756 at age eight in an inoculation barn in Wotton-under-Edge, England. At this time, in preparation for variolation children were bled repeatedly and were given very little to eat and only given a diet drink made to sweeten their blood. This greatly weakened the children before the actual procedure was given. Jenner's own inoculation was administered by a Mr. Holbrow, an apothecary. The procedure involved scratching the arm with the tip of a knife, placing several smallpox scabs in the cuts and then bandaging the arm. After receiving the procedure, the children stayed in the barn for several weeks to recover. First symptoms occurred after one week and usually cleared up three days later. On average, it took a month to fully recover from the encounter with smallpox combined with weakness from the preceding starvation.

At the age of thirteen, Jenner was sent to study medicine in Chipping Sodbury with Daniel Ludlow, a surgeon and apothecary, from 1762 to 1770 who had a strong sense of cleanliness which Jenner learned from him. During his apprenticeship, Jenner heard that upon contracting cowpox, the recipient became immune to smallpox for the remainder of their life. However, this theory was dismissed because of several cases proving that the opposite was true.

After learning all he could from Ludlow, Jenner apprenticed with John Hunter in London from 1770 to 1773. Hunter was a correspondent of Ludlow's, and it is likely that Ludlow recommended Jenner to apprentice with Hunter. Hunter believed in deviating from the accepted treatment and trying new methods if the traditional methods failed. This was considered unconventional medicine at the time and had a pivotal role in Jenner's development as a scientist.

After two years of apprenticeship, Jenner moved back to his hometown of Berkeley in Gloucestershire, where he quickly gained the respect of both his patients and other medical professionals for his work as a physician. It was during this time that Jenner revisited the connection between cowpox and smallpox. He began investigating dairy farms in the Gloucestershire area looking for cowpox. This research was slow going as Jenner often had to wait months or even years before cases of cowpox would again return to the Gloucestershire area. During his study, he found that cowpox was actually several diseases that were similar in nature but were distinguishable through slight differences, and that not all versions had the capacity to make one immune from smallpox upon contraction.

Through his study, he incorrectly deduced that smallpox and cowpox were all the same disease, simply manifesting themselves differently in different animals, eventually setting back his research and making it difficult to publish his findings. Though Jenner had seen cases of people becoming immune to smallpox after having cowpox, too many exceptions of people still contracting smallpox after having had cowpox were arising. Jenner was missing crucial information which he later discovered in 1796. Jenner hypothesized that in order to become immune to smallpox using cowpox, the matter from the cowpox pustules must be administered at maximum potency; else it was too weak to be effective in creating immunity to smallpox. He deduced that cowpox was most likely to transfer immunity from smallpox if administered at the eighth day of the disease.

On May 14, 1796, he performed an experiment in which he took pus from a sore of a cowpox-infected milkmaid named Sarah Nelmes, and applied it to a few small scratches on the arm of an eight-year-old boy who had never before contracted either smallpox or cowpox, named James Phipps. Phipps recovered as expected. Two months later, Jenner repeated the procedure using matter from smallpox, observing no effect. Phipps became the first person to become immune to smallpox without ever actually having the disease. He was variolated many more times over the course of his life to prove his immunity.

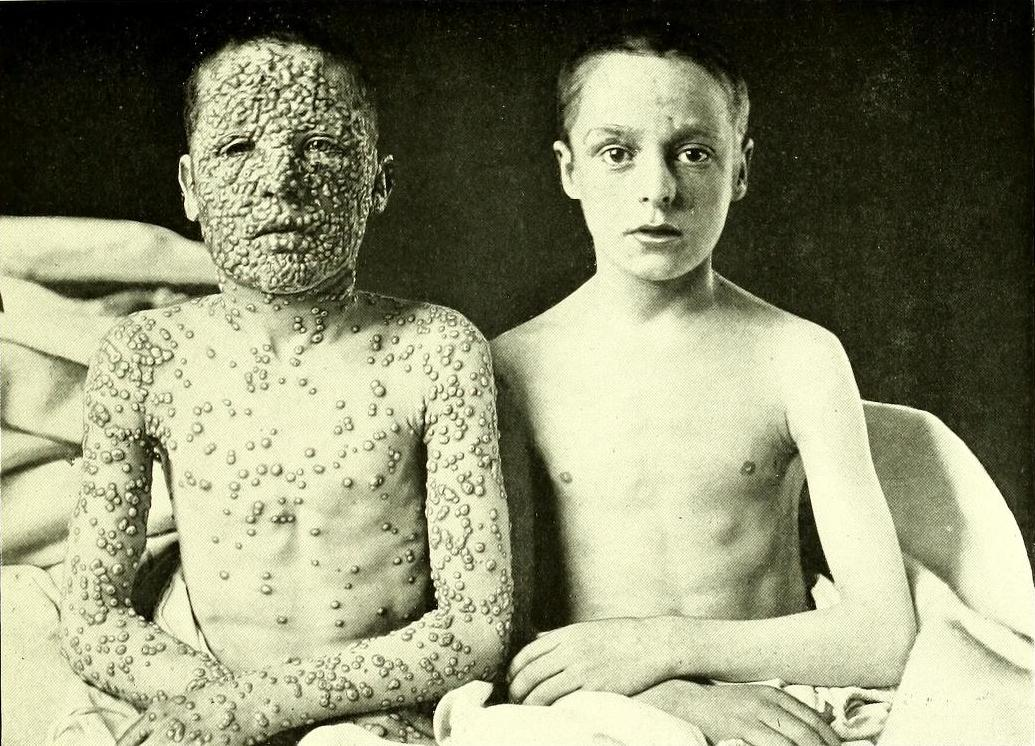
Photograph by Allan Warner of two boys who came in contact with smallpox, 1901. The one on the right was vaccinated in infancy, the other was not vaccinated.

When the next cowpox epidemic broke out in 1798, Jenner conducted a series of inoculations using cowpox, all of them successful including on his own son Robert. Because his findings were revolutionary and lacked in evidence, the Royal Society (of which Jenner was a member) refused to publish his findings. Jenner then rode to London and had his book An Inquiry into the Causes and Effects of the Variolæ Vaccinæ published by Sampson Low's firm in June 1798. The book was an instant bestseller among the elite in London salons, in the medical establishment and among the ladies and gentlemen of the enlightenment.

Knowledge of the ability of cowpox to provide immunity from smallpox was present in England before Jenner's discovery. In 1774, a cattle dealer named Benjamin Jesty had successfully inoculated his wife and three sons using cowpox. This was before Jenner discovered the immunization capabilities of cowpox. However, Jesty simply performed the procedure; he did not take the discovery any further by inoculating his family with smallpox matter to see if there would be a reaction or perform any other trials. Jenner was the first to prove the effectiveness of vaccination with cowpox using scientific experimentation.

==== United States ====
Benjamin Franklin, who had lost his own son to smallpox in 1736, made the suggestion to create a pamphlet to distribute to families explaining how to inoculate their children themselves, so as to eliminate cost as the factor in the decision to choose to inoculate children. William Heberden, a friend of Franklin's and an English physician, followed through with Franklin's idea, printing 2000 pamphlets in 1759 which were distributed by Franklin in America.

An American physician, John Kirkpatrick, upon his visit to London in 1743, told of an instance where variolation stopped an epidemic in Charleston, South Carolina, in 1738, where 800 people were inoculated and only eight deaths occurred. His account of the success of variolation in Charleston helped to play a role in the revival of its practice in London. Kirkpatrick also advocated inoculating patients with matter from the sores of another inoculated person, instead of using matter from the sore of a smallpox victim, a procedure that Maitland had been using since 1722.

In 1832 President Andrew Jackson signed Congressional authorization and funding to set up a smallpox vaccination program for Indian tribes. The goal was to eliminate the deadly threat of smallpox to a population with little or no immunity, and at the same time exhibit the benefits of cooperation with the government. In practice there were severe obstacles. The tribal medicine men launched a strong opposition, warning of white trickery and offering an alternative explanation and system of cure. They taught that the affliction could best be cured by a sweat bath followed by a rapid plunge into cold water. Furthermore the vaccines often lost their potency when transported and stored over long distances with primitive storage facilities. It was too little and too late to avoid the great smallpox epidemic of 1837 to 1840 that swept across North America west of the Mississippi, all the way to Canada and Alaska. Deaths have been estimated in the range of 100,000 to 300,000, with entire tribes such as the Mandans wiped out.

In the 1960s, U.S. President Lyndon B. Johnson gave an outstanding amount of support for the eradication of smallpox, both politically and financially, while also raising awareness through public speeches. During this time, President Johnson's administration was a vital factor that helped the lives of many and ensured that the distribution of vaccines and the attempts to end smallpox were becoming successful. His administration also gave funding and assistance to the WHO, which in turn helped the U.S. and the world move towards innovations in vaccine and disease technology.

During the American Revolutionary War, smallpox became a significant threat to the Continental army under the leadership of George Washington. In 1775, Washington took command of the army near Boston. Smallpox was already prevalent throughout the entire city and became a serious threats to military operations as a whole. The disease began to spread through military camps, affecting soldiers who have not previously been exposed to the disease. On February 6, 1777, George Washington made the decision to inoculate his soldiers to prevent the spread of Smallpox throughout the army and prevent further deaths. Washington detailed his decision in doing so in a letter written to Dr.William Shippen Jr. Washington claims that the decision came with advantages as well as disadvantages but overall will lead to "happy effects".

== Historical relationship to related viruses ==
Taterapox (which infects rodents) and camelpox are the closest relatives to smallpox, and share the same common ancestor with smallpox about 4,000 years ago. It is not clear exactly when during this period Variola first infected humans. Cowpox, horsepox, and monkeypox are more distantly related. All of these viruses share a common ancestor about 10,000 years ago. All of these viruses belong to the genus Orthopoxvirus.

== Since eradication ==
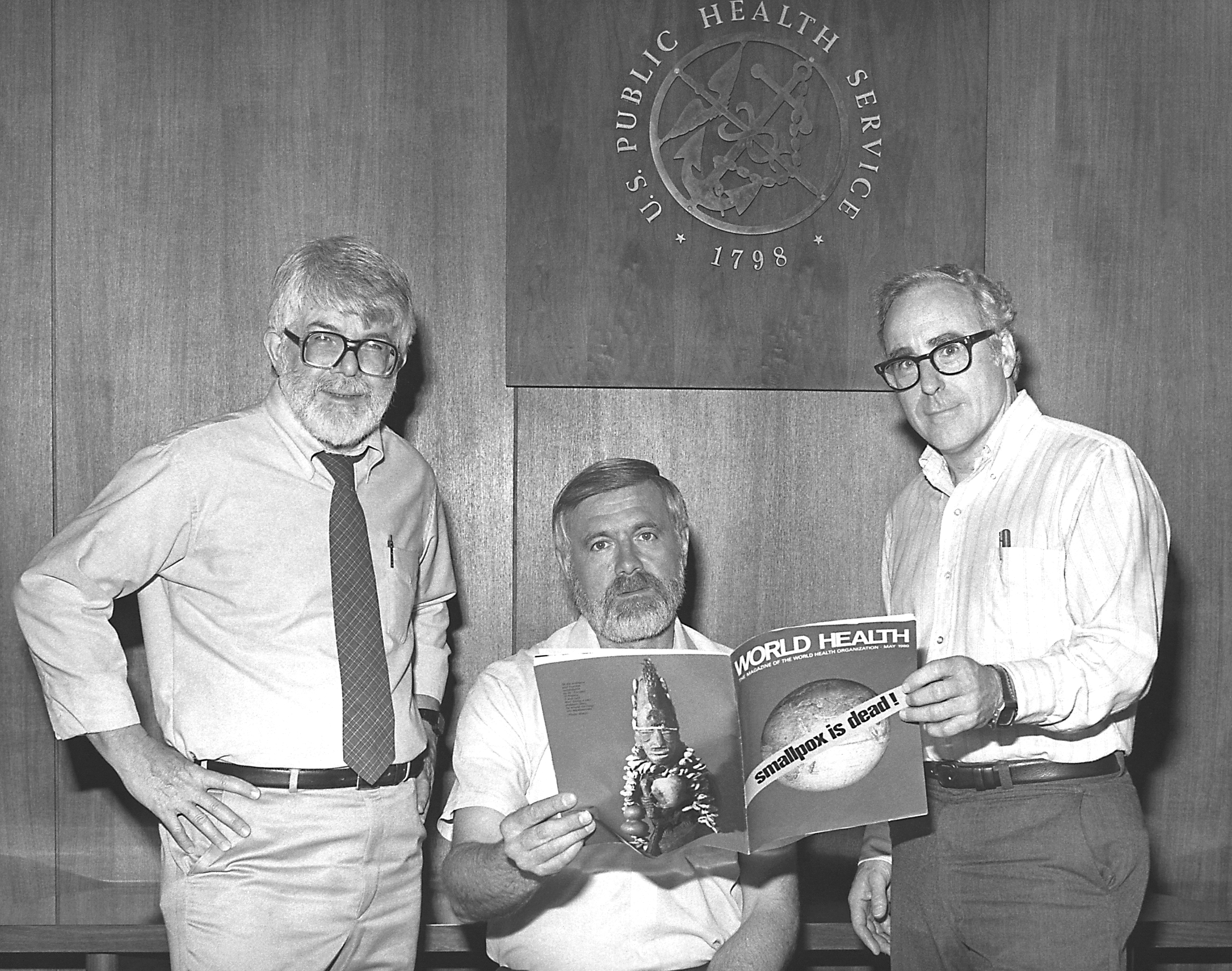
Three former directors of the Global Smallpox Eradication Program read the news that smallpox had been globally eradicated, 1980.

The last case of smallpox in the world occurred in an outbreak in the United Kingdom in 1978. A medical photographer, Janet Parker, contracted the disease at the University of Birmingham Medical School and died on 11 September 1978. Although it has remained unclear how Parker became infected, the source of the infection was established to be the variola virus grown for research purposes at the Medical School laboratory. All known stocks of smallpox worldwide were subsequently destroyed or transferred to two WHO-designated reference laboratories with BSL-4 facilities – the United States' Centers for Disease Control and Prevention (CDC) and the Soviet Union's (now Russia's) State Research Center of Virology and Biotechnology VECTOR.

WHO first recommended destruction of the virus in 1986 and later set the date of destruction to be 30 December 1993. This was postponed to 30 June 1999. Due to resistance from the U.S. and Russia, in 2002 the World Health Assembly agreed to permit the temporary retention of the virus stocks for specific research purposes. Destroying existing stocks would reduce the risk involved with ongoing smallpox research; the stocks are not needed to respond to a smallpox outbreak. Some scientists have argued that the stocks may be useful in developing new vaccines, antiviral drugs, and diagnostic tests; a 2010 review by a team of public health experts appointed by WHO concluded that no essential public health purpose is served by the U.S. and Russia continuing to retain virus stocks. The latter view is frequently supported in the scientific community, particularly among veterans of the WHO Smallpox Eradication Program.

On March 31, 2003, smallpox scabs from a vaccination were found inside an envelope in an 1888 book on Civil War medicine in Santa Fe, New Mexico. The envelope was sent to CDC giving scientists an opportunity to study the history of smallpox vaccination in the United States.

On July 1, 2014, six sealed glass vials of smallpox dated 1954, along with sample vials of other pathogens, were discovered in a cold storage room in an FDA laboratory at the National Institutes of Health location in Bethesda, Maryland. The smallpox vials were subsequently transferred to the custody of the CDC in Atlanta, where virus taken from at least two vials proved viable in culture. After studies were conducted, the CDC destroyed the virus under WHO observation on February 24, 2015.

In 2017, scientists at the University of Alberta recreated an extinct horse pox virus to demonstrate that the variola virus can be recreated in a small lab at a cost of about $100,000, by a team of scientists without specialist knowledge. Although the scientists performed the research to help development of new vaccines as well as trace smallpox's history, the possibility of the techniques being used for nefarious purposes was immediately recognized, raising questions on dual use research and regulations.

In September 2019, the Russian lab housing smallpox samples experienced a gas explosion that injured one worker. It did not occur near the virus storage area, and no samples were compromised, but the incident prompted a review of risks to containment.

== See also ==
- List of epidemics and pandemics
- Native American disease and epidemics
- Population history of indigenous peoples of the Americas
- History of smallpox in Mexico

== Sources ==
- Fenner, Frank; Henderson, Donald A.; Arita, Isao; Jezek, Zdenek; Ladnyi, Ivan Danilovich; Organization, World Health (1988). Smallpox and its eradication. World Health Organization. hdl:10665/39485. ISBN 978-92-4-156110-5. online
- Hopkins, Donald R. The Greatest Killer: Smallpox in History (U of Chicago Press, 2002)
- Patterson, Kristine B. and Thomas Runge, "Smallpox and the native American." American journal of the medical sciences 323.4 (2002): 216–22. online
