= Fort Clark =

Fort Clark can refer to the following locations in the United States, listed alphabetically by state:

- Fort Clark Trading Post State Historic Site, North Dakota
- Fort Clark, later Clarksville, Indiana
- Fort Clark, built at 17th-century site of former Fort Crèvecoeur near Peoria, Illinois
- Fort Osage (Fort Clark, Missouri), site of the Treaty of Fort Clark, ceding Osage Nation lands
- Fort Clark, North Carolina, site of the Battle of Hatteras Inlet Batteries
- Fort Clark, Texas, near Brackettville, Texas
