= 1770s Pacific Northwest smallpox epidemic =

The first known smallpox epidemic to strike the native peoples of the coastal and interior Pacific Northwest arrived in the early 1770s, devastating large swathes of the population and causing significant demographic collapse – both from the disease itself and corresponding malnutrition from the deaths of hunters within tribes. Poorly attested due to a lack of consistent European presence during the period, it most likely originated from Bruno de Heceta and Bodega y Quadra's 1775 expedition to the Northwest Coast, spreading as far inland as the Bitterroot Salish territories in western Montana and as far north as the Tlingit at Sitka. Widespread pockmarks and scars among older native populations were recorded by European explorers for several decades afterwards, including Lewis and Clark and George Vancouver. Several additional smallpox epidemics would occur in the region over the following decades.

== Background ==
Smallpox is a highly infectious disease spread primarily through droplet infection, as well as direct contact with infected individuals or corpses. Typically, the disease incubates asymptomatically for a period of two weeks before becoming infectious for another two-week period. The more deadly and historically prominent variant, Variola major, kills about 30% of non-immune populations. Those who survive are left with pockmarks across their body and a lifelong immunity to the disease.

Originating in the Eastern Hemisphere, smallpox was first introduced to the Americas shortly after the beginning of the Columbian Exchange. Brought to Santo Domingo in 1519, it spread to the mainland during the Spanish conquest of the Aztec Empire, causing widespread devastation across Mesoamerica.

=== Possible antecedents ===
The 1520s smallpox epidemic spread from Mesoamerica into adjacent maize-growing regions in North America. A population decline in the Columbia Basin, evidenced archaeologically by a sharp regional decline in artifacts and structures in the early 1500s, has been tentatively linked to a spread of this outbreak, but greatly predates any written record in the region. Other causes for the population decline than disease are possible.

Excepting possible Spanish or East Asian shipwrecks in earlier periods, possible origins of disease spread on the Pacific Coast began in the late 1500s with the landing of Francis Drake at California. European contact in the Northwest only began in the late 1700s with Spanish, British, and Russian exploration in the region. No evidence of pandemics during this period are attested in the Northwest.

== Historical accounts ==
A severe paucity of sources limits research into the spread and effects of the pandemic. No European explorers directly witnessed the pandemic, only writing about their effects. Anthropologist Robert T. Boyd describes the epidemic as existing in a "shadowy period at the juncture of the protohistoric and historic eras", occurring almost immediately prior to sustained European presence in the Pacific Northwest.

Nathaniel Portlock, docked at Chichagof Island, Alaska, in August 1787, encountered many Tlingit scarred or blinded by the disease, although noted that certain Tlingit populations appeared to have completely escaped its effects. A Tlingit man, scarred by the disease, described losing ten children from the disease, each memorialized by a tattoo on his arm. Portlock, noting that the man had several surviving children under the age of 10–12 years, concluded that it had been spread by Spanish explorers some time in the 1770s. Étienne Marchand, visiting Sitka, also reported widespread pockmarks among the Tlingit. Sailors of the Columbia Rediviva noted the recent presence of smallpox among the Ditidaht of Vancouver Island and the Tillamook of the Oregon Coast.

George Vancouver and Peter Puget, in their 1790s expedition to the Pacific Northwest, noted significant amount of smallpox scarring and partial blindness among Coast Salish groups, including the Twana. In 1806, the Lewis and Clark Expedition reported evidence of a smallpox epidemic "28 or 30 years prior" among the Clatsop. Christian missionaries and employees of the Hudson's Bay Company both reported signs of a past smallpox epidemic in the interior northwest during the mid-1800s.

== Epidemiology ==
The 1770s epidemic was the most devastating and widespread of all recorded epidemics among the Northwest Coast natives, as well as the first recorded. A virgin soil epidemic, it spread rapidly across a population which had no prior immunity to the disease.

=== Origin ===
The origin of the epidemic is unknown. Kamchatka, New Spain, and the Great Plains have all been suggested as a possible origin point for the Northwestern epidemic. It is possible that smallpox was simultaneously introduced from multiple sources to different regions.

A Spanish origin for the pandemic is supported by the majority of scholarly literature. Spanish explorers are known to have visited the Northwest Coast in 1774, 1775, and 1779. Folklore among Northern coast natives describing the arrival of "disease boats" has been used to support a Spanish origin for the epidemic. Critiques of the theory include the lack of clear evidence of any disease except scurvy aboard the ships, voyages exceeding typical timelines for smallpox infectivity, and a lack of evidence for smallpox outbreaks in Mexico until the autumn of 1779, half a year after the departure of Arteaga's 1779 expedition. However, the possibility of endemic smallpox in central Mexico, typical in such highly populated regions, would allow for disease transmission outside of periods of epidemic illness. The 1775 expedition led by Bruno de Heceta and Bodega y Quadra has been cited as the most likely origin out of the Spanish expeditions.

In 1768 and 1768, a devastating smallpox epidemic struck the Kamchatka Peninsula, killing thousands. A Russian account describes the disease as spreading into the peninsula from the "Eastern Islands" (likely referring to the Kuril Islands) due to a single infected individual. Support for the theory mainly stems from the earlier date for the pandemic estimated among the Tlingit and the presence of a Russian vessel in South Alaska during the Kamchatka epidemic. However, accounts that Tlingit north of Sitka were spared of the disease heavily disrupts the theory.

Theories alleging an origin from the Plains Indians rely on reports by missionaries and fur traders during the early 19th century describing the epidemic as coming from the plains during mountain-crossing bison hunts. A large scale smallpox epidemic is attested among the Sioux and Blackfoot, but only beginning around 1780. Accounts by native informants may have confused the origins of the 1770s epidemic with another on the Columbia Plateau in 1801–1802, for which a Great Plains origin is firmly attested. An earlier 1787–1788 account by the Piegan Blackfoot Saukamappee describes smallpox as spreading several years prior from the Shoshone into the Plains, indicating a possible spread from a 1781 pandemic among the Pueblo.

=== Spread ===
The epidemic is attested among the Tlingit, Haida, Coast Salish, Ditidaht, Chinook, Nuu-chah-nulth, Kwakwakaʼwakw, Tillamook, Nez Perce, Colville, Ktunaxa, and Bitterroot Salish. Dates estimated for the epidemic among the coast predate those further inland by several years.

==== Treatment ====
Traditional medicine practitioners were unprepared to treat a highly infectious disease. Group healing ceremonies were a common forms of folk medicine, but only served to further transmit the illness. Sweat baths and immersion in cold water, common among Plateau groups, could lead to the death of the infected by shock or pneumonia. However, the practice of burning the belongings of the deceased (including the homes for prestigious individuals) may have slightly diminished the spread.

== Effects and legacy ==
The debilitating effects of smallpox on infected individuals led to an inability to participate in hunting and foraging. This may have led to intense malnutrition among tribal communities, most prominently on those who depended on others for food, such as young children and the elderly. The effects of the illness additionally rendered breastfeeding impossible by infected mothers. One Vancouver Island informant, as recorded by Edward Curtis, attributes the destruction of the Hoyalas tribe of Quatsino Sound to the epidemic, although other accounts attribute their disappearance to warfare. Samish and Lummi oral histories also speak of the destruction of multiple villages, and the near-extinction of several tribes.

Smallpox would re-emerge in the region following the 1770s epidemic. In 1782, two thirds of the Stó꞉lō died from a smallpox outbreak. Other smallpox epidemics would occur in the Lower Columbia basin during the 1830s and 40s, and across wide swathes of British Columbia in the 1860s.

== See also ==
- History of smallpox
- 1775–1782 North American smallpox epidemic
- List of notable disease outbreaks in the United States
