= Baltimore General Dispensary =

Historic building in Maryland, USA

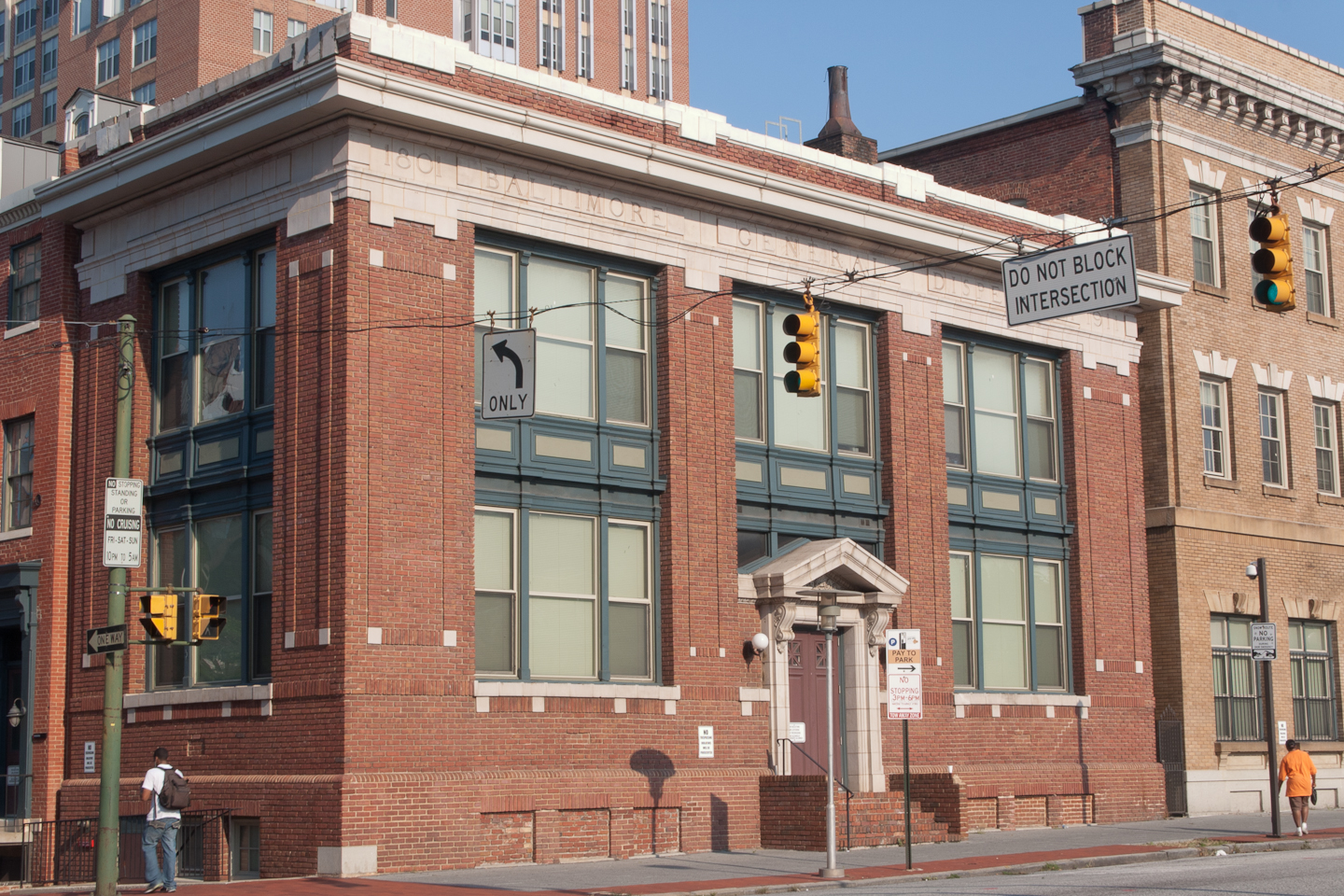

Geography
- Location: Baltimore, Maryland, United States

History
- Opened: 1801

Links
- Lists: Hospitals in Maryland
- Baltimore General Dispensary
- U.S. National Register of Historic Places
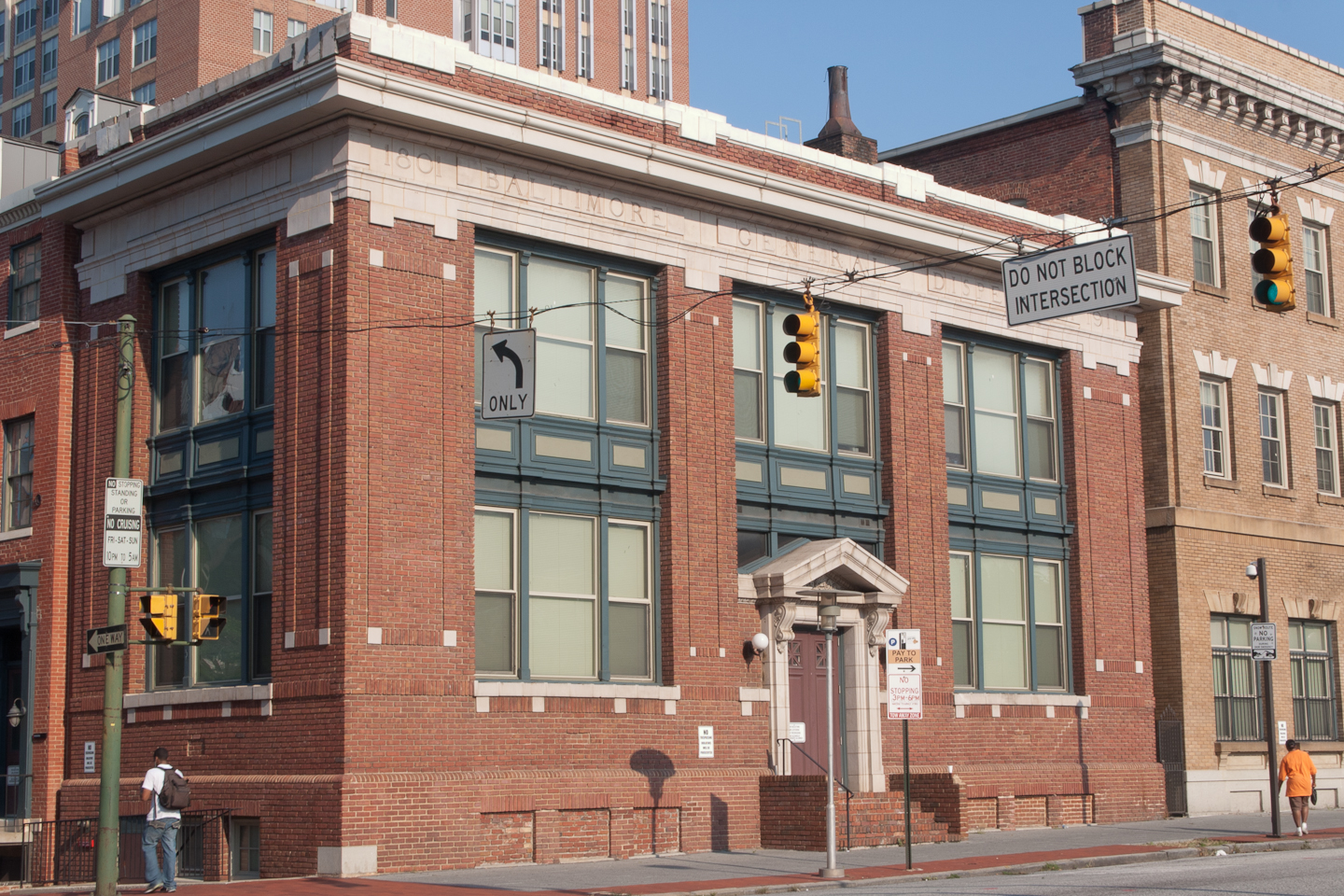
- Baltimore General Dispensary, August 2011

- Location within Baltimore Location within Maryland Location within the United States
- Location: 500 West Fayette St., Baltimore, Maryland
- Coordinates: 39°17′25.8″N 76°37′21.3″W
- Area: 0.1 acres (0.040 ha)
- Built: 1911
- Architect: MacKenzie, George N., III
- Architectural style: Classical Revival
- NRHP reference No.: 80001779
- Added to NRHP: March 18, 1980

Baltimore General Dispensary is a historic public dispensary building located at Baltimore, Maryland, United States. It opened in 1801 to provide medical and health services to the poor in Baltimore. It is the oldest institution of its kind in Maryland. It is three bays wide and two stories high, with running bond red brick foundation and building walls, and a water table constructed in 1911. The front features a simple cornice surmounting a stone entablature reading: 1801 Baltimore General Dispensary 1911. It is the only surviving building designed for Baltimore's oldest charity. The interior originally featured a large dispensary center on the first floor, separated for black and white patients. The rooms for surgical and medical aid on the second floor gave the poor a measure of privacy rarely available to charity patients.

Baltimore General Dispensary was listed on the National Register of Historic Places in 1980.
