= 1837 Great Plains smallpox epidemic =

Disease outbreak in the United States

- Disease: Smallpox
- First outbreak: steamboat on the Missouri River
- Arrival date: 1837
- Deaths: 17,000+

Between 1836 and 1840, smallpox became widespread across the Great Plains. The epidemic reached its height following the spring of 1837, when an American Fur Company steamboat, the SS St. Peter's, carried infected people and supplies up the Missouri River in the Midwestern United States. The disease spread rapidly to indigenous populations with no natural immunity, causing widespread illness and death across the Great Plains, especially in the Upper Missouri River watershed. More than 17,000 Indigenous people died along the Missouri River alone, with some bands becoming nearly extinct.

One Native tribe majorly affected by the smallpox epidemic was the Mandan tribe. The Mandans traditionally lived along the Missouri River. They had an extraordinarily rich culture, due to them hosting many European and American travelers. The Mandan villages consisted of twelve to a hundred lodges and were well organized with a hierarchy of leaders. In 1750, there were about nine large Mandan villages; however, by the start of the 19th century, the smallpox epidemic decreased the tribe to only two villages. By 1837, there were about 100 to 150 Mandan survivors.

Having witnessed the effects of the epidemic on the Mandan tribe, fur trader Francis Chardon wrote: "the small-pox had never been known in the civilized world, as it had been among the poor Mandans and other Indians. Only twenty-seven Mandans were left to tell the tale." In 1839, the United States Commissioner of Indian Affairs reported on the casualties: "No attempt has been made to count the victims, nor is it possible to reckon them in any of these tribes with accuracy; it is believed that if [the number 17,200 for the upper Missouri River Indians] was doubled, the aggregate would not be too large for those who have fallen east of the Rocky Mountains."

== History ==
Smallpox is a highly contagious viral disease which can be transmitted through direct contact with a person that is already affected with smallpox. Touching clothing, bedding, dust, or any other objects that were previously touched by an infected person can result in transmission of the disease. First afflicted Native Americans after it was carried to the Western Hemisphere by early European explorers, with credible accounts of epidemics dating back to at least 1515. Smallpox proved particularly deadly in the interior parts of North America such as on the Great Plains because these populations were among the last to experience steady contact with European settlers, such that few if any people in these communities had been previously exposed to European pathogens and developed natural immunity to them. Mortality rates were therefore typically extremely high.

By the 1730s, smallpox had made its way west across Canada and the northern United States to the edge of the American frontier. The Assiniboine First Nation had controlled much of this territory, but were forced to give it up as their population decreased dramatically as a result of the disease's high mortality rate. Along the Missouri River the Arikara population was reduced by half by the end of the 1730s. Other communities decimated by smallpox in the 1730s include the Lower Loup, Pawnee of Nebraska, Cherokee, and Kansa.

In 1796, English physician Edward Jenner discovered that infecting a person with the comparatively mild cowpox infection could provide immunity to smallpox, and thus invented the world's first vaccine. As its use became widespread in Europe, deployment of the smallpox vaccine in North America was praised by Thomas Jefferson as a means of preserving lives. Unfortunately, supply lines for the vaccine were faulty and it was not until the 1830s that a significant portion of the Indigenous population was vaccinated, and even here it was limited beyond the Southwest. Early vaccination efforts by the Hudson's Bay Company (HBC) were sporadic and unorganized during its monopoly period. Although the HBC recognized the potential importance of vaccination, understanding that more people meant more fur and business, they did not implement a systematic vaccination program until 1838. Some vaccines were sent to HBC trading posts early in the 19th century but were never distributed.

Smallpox infections spiked in the 1780s and persisted up to the 1837 epidemic. In what is now Canada, the fur trade strengthened communities such as the Mushego Cree, Anishinaabe, and Ottawa. In the United States, the Mandan tribe had previously experienced a major smallpox epidemic in 1780–1781, which severely reduced their numbers to less than a few thousand. Many other bands along the Missouri River suffered smallpox epidemics during 1801–1802 and 1831.

Sporadic efforts were made to promote vaccination among the Indigenous peoples after the turn of the nineteenth century. With the passage of the Indian Vaccination Act of 1832, the U.S. Congress took its first step toward generating public support for vaccination of the Native Americans. But the scope of this program was limited; shortly after its passage, Secretary of War Lewis Cass stated that no effort would be made "under any circumstances" to send surgeons to vaccinate Indians up the Missouri River beyond the Arikara tribe, denying vaccine requests from those tribes. It seems that Cass was more interested in establishing fur trading routes on the Missouri River without Native interference than he was in helping Native Americans overcome Smallpox on the plains. This decision may have also been influenced by the commissioner of Indian affairs, Elbert Herring, who in his 1832 annual report to the U.S. Congress and the Secretary of War, accused the Chippewa tribe of the Great Plains (a neighboring tribe of the Arikara) of spreading the first Smallpox epidemics through interaction with French and British traders. Thus many thousands of people remained unvaccinated, just as migration and settlement of the frontier by white Americans began to intensify.

== Epidemic ==
The Great Plains smallpox epidemic of 1837 spanned thousands of miles, reaching California, the Pacific Northwest coast, and central Alaska before finally subsiding in 1840. The epidemic is estimated to have killed more than 17,000 people along the Missouri River alone. In the spring of 1837, the SS St. Peter, a steamboat of the American Fur Company, traveled up the Missouri River from St. Louis, Missouri, to Fort Union, in what is now North Dakota, carrying infected people and effecting transmission of the disease along the way. Its voyage is generally considered to mark the beginning of the outbreak.

The St. Peter reached Leavenworth, Kansas around April 29. At this time a deckhand showed signs of smallpox. Shortly after, three Arikara women joined the ship on their trip back to the Mandan community. Although the women showed signs of infection, they were allowed to return to their village, and subsequently spread the disease to their community. The disease was of the most virulent, malignant hemorrhagic form. In July 1837, the Mandan people numbered about 2,000; by October that number had dwindled to just 23 or 27 survivors by some accounts, or 138 by another account, reflecting at least a 93 percent mortality rate. On August 11, Francis Chardon, a trader at Fort Clark, wrote, "I Keep no a/c of the dead, as they die so fast it is impossible," and by the end of the month, "the Mandan are all cut off except twenty-three young and old men."

Once the disease reached Fort Union, there was an effort to prevent its spread, but transmission was already underway, and it would eventually decimate the Assiniboine. Daschuk, Dollar, and Ray all find that there was an effort to keep returning fur traders from entering the fort, but as Dollar finds, returning traders began to get quite aggressive until they were shown an infected boy, as they left they took the disease with them. Halsey wrote, "I sent our interpreter to meet them on every occasion, who represented our situation to them and requested them to return immediately from whence they came however all our endeavors proved fruitless, I could not prevent them from camping round the Fort-they have caught the disease, notwithstanding I have never allowed an Indian to enter the Fort, or any communication between them & the Sick; but I presume the air was infected with it for a half mile..."

Later, a longboat was sent to Fort McKenzie via the Marias River. At Fort McKenzie the disease spread among the Blackfoot people housed there. The epidemic continued to spread into the Great Plains, killing many thousands between 1837 and 1840. In the end, it is estimated that two-thirds of the Blackfoot population died, along with half of the Assiniboine and Arikara, a third of the Crow, and a quarter of the Pawnee. A trader at Fort Union reported "such a stench in the fort that it could be smelt at a distance of 300 yards", as the bodies were buried in large pits, or tossed into the river, which would have likely contributed to continued infection as the bodies remained infectious after death.

There were three major vaccination attempts to stop the spread of smallpox when the epidemic began. Many traders tried to obtain vaccines from the American Fur Company but it was unwilling to heed their requests. The American government made some efforts under the Indian Vaccination Act of 1832. Some did receive vaccines for smallpox, typically ones that were in contact with White Americans, usually in the southern United States. However, the Office of Indian Affairs did not have the network or information needed to vaccinate the plains people quickly, nor did they try establish the needed network.

The Hudson Bay Company had the best response. Rumours of the disease spreading prompted traders to act quickly as a reduction in the indigenous population meant a reduction in profit from the furs they brought in. A good information network, a supply of vaccines at posts, and a willingness among all for vaccination meant their efforts were much more successful than American responses. Vaccination performed by Hudson Bay Company workers and trained Indigenous people were critical to limiting the spread of smallpox in Canada. After the epidemic, the Hudson Bay Company implemented a territory wide vaccination program which further reduced smallpox deaths. Unfortunately, as people entered communities to vaccinate against smallpox, they brought with them other diseases that kept mortality rates high.

The epidemic altered power structures of impacted nations. The Assinboine and Niitsitapi were not vaccinated and their populations and territory shrank considerably. The disease was particularly deadly among these people because of their denser populations. After being hit by the epidemic, these groups were never able to recover. Ethnic backgrounds also merged as survivors from different communities joined. As some communities such as the Saulteaux were able to take advantage of vaccination efforts by the HBC they also took advantage of struggling Indigenous groups. The Hudson Bay Company vaccination efforts were focused on populations that produced furs. As result, the Plains Cree and Saulteaux pushed out its borders as others retreated during the epidemic.

=== Responsibility and allegations of intentional spread ===
Scholars typically attribute the spread of smallpox in spring of 1837 to the failure to quarantine the St. Peter. More recent scholarship from Dashuk, whose work on Indigenous relations in western Canada criticizes European settlers and corporations, argues the spread of smallpox between 1836 and 1840 was unintentional. The start has been linked back to the St. Peter on the Missouri River. In addition, while the AFC responded to the outbreak poorly, encouraging it did not make financial sense. The company profited by an influx of Indigenous people in the early 1830s as it meant more furs for them to trade. Regarding land above the 49th Parallel, as has been shown in this article, the Hudson's Bay Company's response was critical to limiting the epidemic after its outbreak. While specific responsibility for the 1836-40 smallpox epidemic remains in question, scholars have asserted that the epidemic could be tied to a failure to contain the disease once it was discovered on the St. Peter traveling up the Missouri River. R. G. Robertson, in Rotting Face: Smallpox and the American Indian blames Bernard Pratt Jr., captain of the St. Peter, for the spread of the epidemic, due to his unwillingness to quarantine those suspected of infection. Writing that while "not guilty of premeditated genocide... he was guilty of contributing to the deaths of thousands of innocent people. The law calls his offense criminal negligence. Yet in light of all the deaths, the almost complete annihilation of the Mandans, and the terrible suffering the region endured, the label criminal negligence is benign, hardly befitting an action that had such horrendous consequences."

Another frequently recounted story is that an Indian sneaked aboard the St. Peter and stole a blanket from an infected passenger, thus starting the epidemic. The many variations of this account have also been criticized by both historians and contemporaries as fiction; a fabrication intended to assuage the guilt of white settlers. B. A. Mann argues that "the blanket affair was created afterward and is not to be credited".

Some scholars have argued that the spread of the 1836-40 epidemic was intentional. According to Ann F. Ramenofsky, "Variola Major can be transmitted through contaminated articles such as clothing or blankets. In the nineteenth century, the U. S. Army sent contaminated blankets to Native Americans, especially Plains groups, to control the Indian problem." Similar claims were made by Ward Churchill but he was subsequently accused of fabricating evidence. A University of Colorado investigation "[did] not find academic misconduct with respect to his general claim that the U.S. Army deliberately spread smallpox", as "early accounts of what was said by Indians involved in that situation and certain native oral traditions provide some basis for that interpretation." The investigation concluded, however, that Churchill's work displayed

...a pattern of deliberate academic misconduct involving falsification, fabrication, and serious deviation from accepted practices in reporting results from research.

Churchill was subsequently fired from his position at the University of Colorado.

The Mandan chief, Four Bears, denounced the white man, whom he had previously "treated as brothers", for bringing the disease to his people. After losing his wife and children to smallpox, and acquiring the affliction himself, he gave his final speech to the Arikara and Mandan tribes imploring them to "rise all together and not leave one of them alive", before dying on July 30, 1837. However, Four Bears did not mention blankets, the Army, or any other indication that the spread of smallpox to his tribe was intentional.

== Symptoms ==
Called "rotting face" by tribes all across the Great Plains, Smallpox could be identified by the often widespread skin rash covering a person's body and face. The blisters often begin as faint flat spots, before progressing into raised bumps and fluid-filled scabs. Other symptoms of the disease included headache, backache, extreme abdominal pain, diarrhea and vomiting.

The Natives were able to deduce that the disease could be contracted through close contact with an infected individual. Because of this limited understanding, their prevention methods involved the isolation of infected individuals, and their treatments of such patients commonly included cultural practices of the 18th century through the early 19th century.

== See also ==
- Population history of American indigenous peoples
- California Genocide
- Trail of Tears
- Long Walk of the Navajo
- Comanche campaign
- Yavapai Wars
- Northern Cheyenne Exodus
- List of notable disease outbreaks in the United States
