= 1738–1739 North Carolina smallpox epidemic =

Disease outbreak in North America

Between 1738 and 1739, a smallpox epidemic broke out among the Cherokee who resided in the Province of North Carolina, as well as in the Province of South Carolina. The epidemic was most damaging in Eastern North Carolina. The epidemic decimated the Cherokee and Catawba peoples, causing the deaths of about half of each tribe's population. Many other Native tribes were decimated as well. Smaller numbers of European settlers and Africans also died during the epidemic. The depopulation after the epidemic caused the Cherokee to abandon many villages, particularly in Georgia along the Chattooga, Tugaloo, and Chattahoochee rivers. The Cherokee did not begin to recover from their population loss until the end of the 18th century. An estimated 7,700–11,700 died during the epidemic.

The 1738–1739 epidemic was the first known occasion where doctors utilized widespread inoculation as a smallpox preventative. The epidemic was first brought to Charleston, South Carolina by sea. From there, the epidemic spread throughout North and South Carolina. James Kilpatrick was the main person responsible for inoculations in Charleston, inoculating between 800 and 1,000 people, of whom only eight died. The Irish-born historian James Adair claimed that smallpox was introduced by "Guinea-men", enslaved people from West Africa. The epidemic was probably spread to the Cherokee by white traders in the summer of 1739. The virus may also have come from Spanish Florida. 900 Cherokees had joined the British to fight the Spanish in Florida in 1739, and may have brought smallpox back with them. Cherokee "religious physicians" blamed the plague on "adulterous intercourse" among young married people, while Cherokee chiefs alleged that their people had been poisoned by infected rum brought by white traders. Thousands of Cherokee died from the epidemic. It was reported that upon seeing themselves become infected and disfigured, some Cherokee resorted to suicide. Adair claimed that Cherokee people shot themselves, cut their own throats, stabbed themselves with knives or sharp-pointed canes, or burned themselves alive. Cherokee healers attempted to use traditional medicine against the epidemic. Cherokee healers would "sweat" their patients and then dunk them into a cold river, but many Cherokee died from the shock. This caused some of the Cherokee healers to abandon their spiritual beliefs in despair. As the Cherokee began to abandon traditional spiritual beliefs because of their ineffectiveness against smallpox, this left an opening for Christian missionaries who were working to proselytize among the Cherokee.

The epidemic was so damaging to the Waxhaw people that they abandoned their historic homelands in 1740 that were located in what is now Union County, North Carolina. The remnants of the Waxhaw people joined with the Catawba. The lands of the Waxhaw were subsequently occupied by English, German, Scottish, and Welsh settlers.
