= Norfolk Anti-Inoculation Riot of 1768 =

The Norfolk Anti-Inoculation Riot of 1768 was part of a series of riots across the English Colonies in the New World surrounding inoculation against smallpox. Many inhabitants of the colonies were against this relatively new approach to build immunity against smallpox. Inhabitants were afraid that inoculation would infect and kill uninfected communities, but they also objected for political reasons. The riot on June 27, 1768, in Norfolk, Virginia consisted of an anti-inoculation mob invading a plantation where inoculated families resided, ending in the mob driving the families into the local pest house.

== Background ==
When European migration to the New World in the sixteenth century started, smallpox followed, and it infected Natives of the New World and continued to torment European immigrants through the sixteenth, seventeenth, and eighteenth centuries in the English colonies. In the early eighteenth century, Boston physician Zabdiel Boylston and New England puritan minister Cotton Mather introduced the method of inoculation adopted from England to combat smallpox. People that had been avoiding smallpox in this time did not agree with this approach to combat it, since they would basically be infected with the sickness they had been avoiding their whole life. While others supporting inoculation thought that the advantages of inoculation outweighed the risks.

Interestingly, pro and anti-inoculation stances also seemed to be defined by political ideology. Dr. Archibald Campbell along with a group of Norfolk gentlemen decided to employ inoculator Dr. John Dalgleish to inoculate them and their families. Dr. Dalgleish published an article in the Virginia Gazette in support of inoculation, declaring smallpox an epidemic since ships coming from the West Indies constantly brought infected people to the area. The public of Norfolk blamed this epidemic on inoculation rather than the ships, and opposed inoculation altogether. Dr. Campbell was a Loyalist, and was the only Loyalist physician in Norfolk. While leaders of anti-inoculation groups, Maximillian Calvert and Paul Loyal, were Patriots, along with every other physician in Norfolk, who opposed inoculation as well. During this time, the colonies were still controlled by the British Crown, Loyalists remained loyal to the crown during the Revolutionary War while Patriots were in favor of independence. Word got out in Norfolk about Dr.Campbell's inoculation plans, and anti-inoculationists attempted to have the magistrate stop them, when this didn't work, they arranged a meeting between the anti-inoculationists and pro-inoculationists in Mrs. Ross's Tavern in Norfolk. Tensions were not eased after this meeting, but Dr.Campbell agreed to postpone any inoculation plans until after a local court case was finished, which was set to finish in the following months.

== Riot ==
Following the local court case, anti-inoculation groups continued to pressure heads of family to not inoculate their families and those who were already inoculated to leave town, since Dr. Campbell's family had been inoculated a few days after the court was adjourned. Inoculated families were being housed in Dr. Campbell's plantation during the recovery period. Anti-inoculationists proposed that inoculated families be moved from Dr. Campbell's plantation to the local pest house to prevent infection. Dr. Campbell and Norfolk Mayor Cornelius Calvert agreed to the proposition. But before a plan to move those inoculated was formulated, Joseph Calvert, an anti-inoculationist, put a mob together in order to take care of the transfer themselves.

On the evening of June 27, 1768, the mob went to the Campbell plantation. Once they arrived to the plantation, one of the mob leaders, Paul Loyal, proposed a truce between them and the people in the plantation, and those in the plantation agreed. When the plantation inhabitants put their arms down, the mob, mostly intoxicated, invaded the plantation and rushed the inhabitants to vacate the property. Magistrates were present in the riot, but made no efforts to stop the mob. Those that were inoculated in the plantation were in no condition to move at that moment since many had fevers and other side effects. This forced family-heads to plead with the mob to give them time. The multitude declared: "if the people weren't in condition to leave the inoculation house they should have thought of that before they were inoculated". The mob led the families by foot to the local pest house, in the middle of a thunderstorm. Once the inoculated families were settled, the mob returned to town and broke the windows of the houses of the many inoculationists present in the Campbell plantation.

== Aftermath ==
Following the riot, Mayor Cornelius Calvert moved to press charges against those involved in the June 27 riot. Maximilian Calvert and Paul Loyal dodged charges and fines and Joseph Calvert denied his involvement in the riot, resulting in no one being convicted. Tensions between Joseph Calvert and Dr. Campbell continued. It was reported that they had a fight after the riot, but there were no substantial injuries to either party. Letters were published in the Virginia Gazette showing sympathy to the inoculated families attacked during the riot. After the Calvert-Campbell fight and the Virginia Gazette letters, tensions died down for the rest of the year.

In April 1769, the same anti-inoculation crowd aimed to press charges against Dr. Dalgleish and those inoculated the. year prior, and a hearing was held. The hearing was unsuccessful, since the only charges anti-inoculationists could bring against Dr. Dalgleish were those of inoculation itself. Since inoculation wasn't illegal, nothing came of the hearing. Following this hearing, a ship belonging to Mayor Calvert entered the Norfolk port, reportedly with 3 apprentices and their slaves who had contracted smallpox. One of the apprentices died at sea. While the other 2 apprentices were recovering, Mayor Calvert had Dr. Dalgleish inoculate their slaves. An anti-inoculationist that participated in the June 27th riot heard about these inoculations, and put another mob together and attacked Mayor Calvert's house, where they arrested Dr. Dalgleish.
