= John Redman Coxe =

American physician and medical educator (1773–1864)

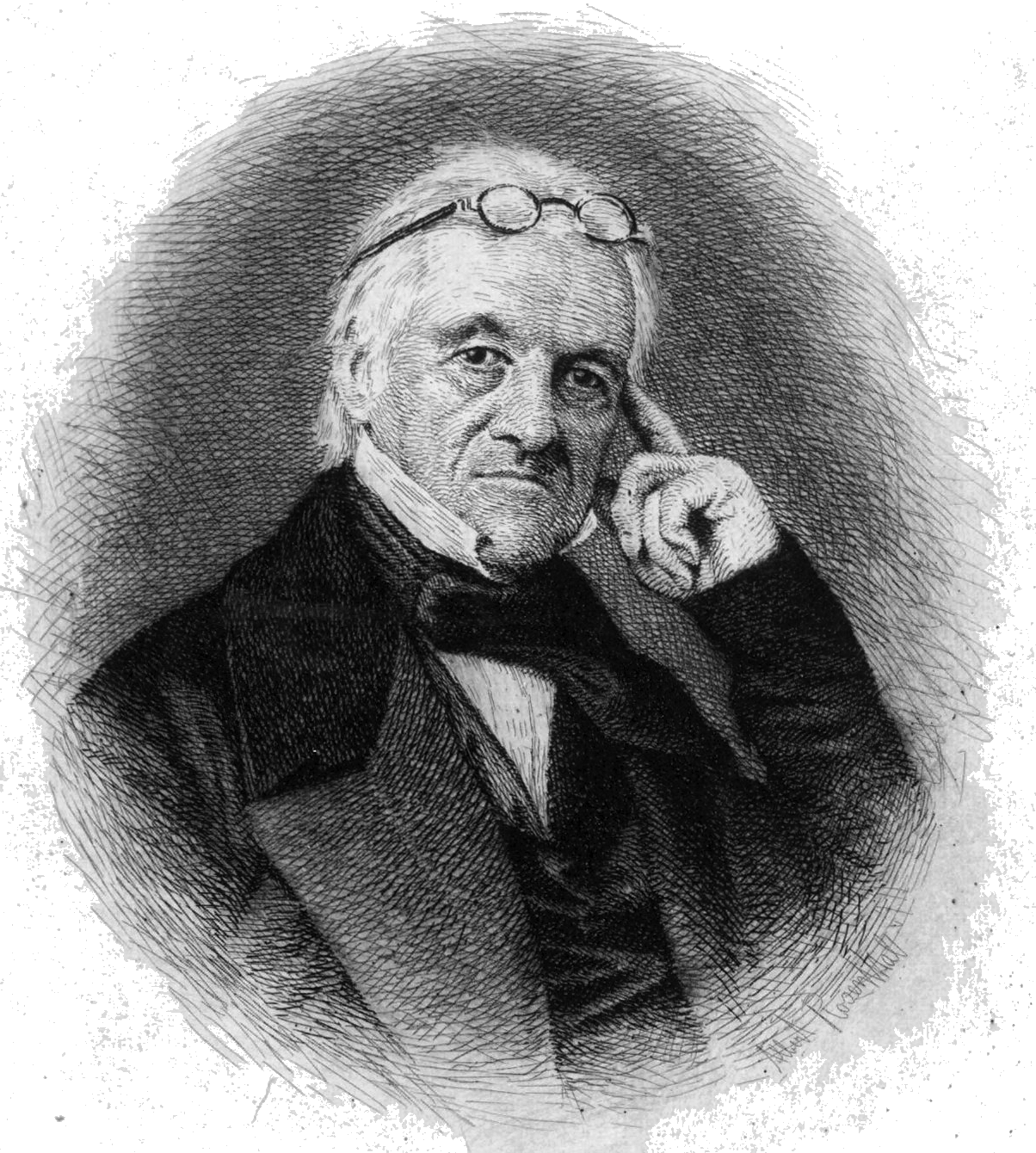
- Sketch of John Redman Coxe
- Born: 16 September 1773; Trenton, New Jersey
- Died: 22 March 1864 (aged 90); Philadelphia, Pennsylvania
- Education: University of Pennsylvania
- Known for: Vaccination; Smallpox vaccine; Yellow fever
- Spouse: Sarah Cox (m. 1799; died 1843)
- Children: 6
- Relatives: John Redman
- Scientific career
- Fields: Physician-scientist; Professor of chemistry; Professor of medicine
- Workplaces: American Philosophical Society; College of Physicians of Philadelphia; Philadelphia College of Pharmacy
- Patrons: Pennsylvania Hospital; Philadelphia Dispensary
- Academic advisors: Benjamin Rush

John Redman Coxe (September 16, 1773 – March 22, 1864) was a medical doctor and professor of medicine at the University of Pennsylvania.

== Early life and education ==
Born in Trenton, New Jersey, Coxe, was reportedly descended from a long line of medical and surgical ancestors, several of whom, at different periods, were physicians to the kings and queens of England. He was educated under the care of his European-educated grandfather, Dr. John Redman, in Philadelphia, Pennsylvania.

Redman seems to have liked English methods best, for he sent his grandson to English schools and on to the University of Edinburgh when Coxe was sixteen to begin classical studies under a chosen teacher. There the surgeon with whom he boarded induced him to attend the hospital lectures. In his autobiography Coxe wrote: "After fifteen months in Edinburgh I returned to London in 1789 and attended two courses of anatomy and chemistry at the London Hospital and in 1790 left England to more directly study medicine under Dr. Benjamin Rush, and stayed with him until I obtained my degree in the University of Pennsylvania of doctor of medicine in 1794". During the 1793 Philadelphia yellow fever epidemic so great was the number of patients that he fought the plague side by side with Dr. Rush and seldom saw fewer than thirty to fifty a day. For "his skill, fortitude, patience and perseverance, and humanity" during that hard time, Dr. Rush gave him a "Commentary on Boerhaave".

In 1794 he returned to Europe, spending two years studying in the hospitals of London, Edinburgh and Paris. He then returned to Philadelphia in 1796 or 1797, to enter into practice.

== Career ==
In 1798, Coxe filled the position of Port Physician. He was a physician of the Pennsylvania Hospital, and for five years Physician of the Philadelphia Dispensary. Coxe was an early enthusiastic advocate of vaccination, and was reportedly "the first to use it in Philadelphia". In 1801 he vaccinated himself and his baby son Edward Jenner Coxe, "thus doing much to establish confidence in the new preventive". In 1802, he published his Practical Observations on Vaccination or Inoculation for the Cow-Pock. The child was named after Edward Jenner, the inventor of vaccination, and was vaccinated at twenty-three days old. Coxe has so much faith in vaccination that he placed his son in the arms of a man dying of smallpox. The disease did not prove contagious.

He was professor of chemistry at the University of Pennsylvania from 1809 to 1818, and professor of materia medica and pharmacy from 1818 to 1835. The success of the New York Medical Repository, then seven years old (1804), made Coxe think of publishing a quarterly, The Medical Museum, with a section called "The Medical and Philosophical Register". The Medical Museum debuted well, with papers contributed by well-regarded doctors, and existed until 1811, "paving the way for similar journals, while being itself the first uniformly issued periodical in Philadelphia". During this time, Coxe was also an editor of The American Dispensary, and a medical dictionary. One source described Coxe as being "under the influence of earlier systems and became the most notable illustrator of the conservative teaching of an older time, though this in no way affected the good he did as the inaugurator of medical journalism". Another declared him "one of the first great medical writers in this country".

He invented "Coxe's Hive Syrup," Syrupus Scillae Compositus U.S.P., which "had a great vogue for half a century", and lectured to druggists and apothecaries until a sufficient number had been educated to form the Philadelphia College of Pharmacy. In 1829 he succeeded in cultivating the true jalap plant, so that its real character and position might be determined. Jalap, a cathartic drug derived from the tuberous roots of Ipomoea purga, had been known in Europe since the beginning of the 17th century, but its botanical source was not accurately determined until Coxe published his description. Despite his lengthy tenure as a professor, the University of Pennsylvania medical faculty "found the subject of materia medica and pharmacy to be of secondary interest" and "had little respect for Coxe's abilities as a teacher", leading to the termination of his teaching position in 1835.

Coxe was also among the first American scientists attracted to the study of electrical phenomena, and it has been claimed that "[h]is familiarity with the science of electricity led him to anticipate the alleged discoveries of Morse many years afterward". In a letter written to an English friend, published in Thomas Thompson's Annals of Philosophy, Coxe wrote:

I have contemplated this important agent (electricity) as a probable means of establishing telegraphic communications with as much rapidity as, and perhaps less expense than, any hitherto employed. I do not know how far experiment has determined galvanic action to be communicated by means of wires; but there is no reason to suppose it confined to limits, certainly not as to time. Now, by means of apparatus fixed at certain distances, as telegraph stations, by tubes for the decomposition of water and of metallic salts, etc., regularly ranged, such a key might be adopted as would be requisite to communicate words, sentences, figures, from one station to another; and soon to the end of the line. However fanciful and speculative, I have no doubt that, sooner or later, it will be rendered useful to practice".

== Publications ==
His writings included:

- "Inaugural Essay on Inflammation" (1794).
- "An inquiry into the comparative effects of the Opium officianarum extracted from the Papaver somniferum, a White Poppy of Linnarus, and of that procured from the Lactuca Sativa, a common Cultivated lettuce of America", read before the American Philosophical Society (November 24, 1797).
- "Pamphlet giving a short view of the importance and respectability of the science of Medicine. Observations on Combustion and Acidification, with a Theory of These Processes founded on the Phlogistic and Antiphlogistic Doctrines" (1801).
- Practical Observations on Vaccination, Philadelphia (1802).
- Medical Museum (eight volumes; 1804-1812).
- American Dispensatory (1806, '10, '14, '18, '30, '31).
- Philadelphia Medical Dictionary (1808-1817).
- Emporium of Arts and Sciences (five volumes; 1812).
- "Refutation of Harvey's claims to the discovery of the circulation of the blood" (1827).
- "Origin of the Circulation of the Blood", Philadelphia (1834).
- "An appeal to the Medical Public from the Proceedings of the Trustees of the University of Pennsylvania vacating the Chair of Materia Medica and Pharmacy", (1835).
- "Cato", Bost. Med. & Surg. Jour. (1849), vol. xli, p. 156–159.

== Personal life ==
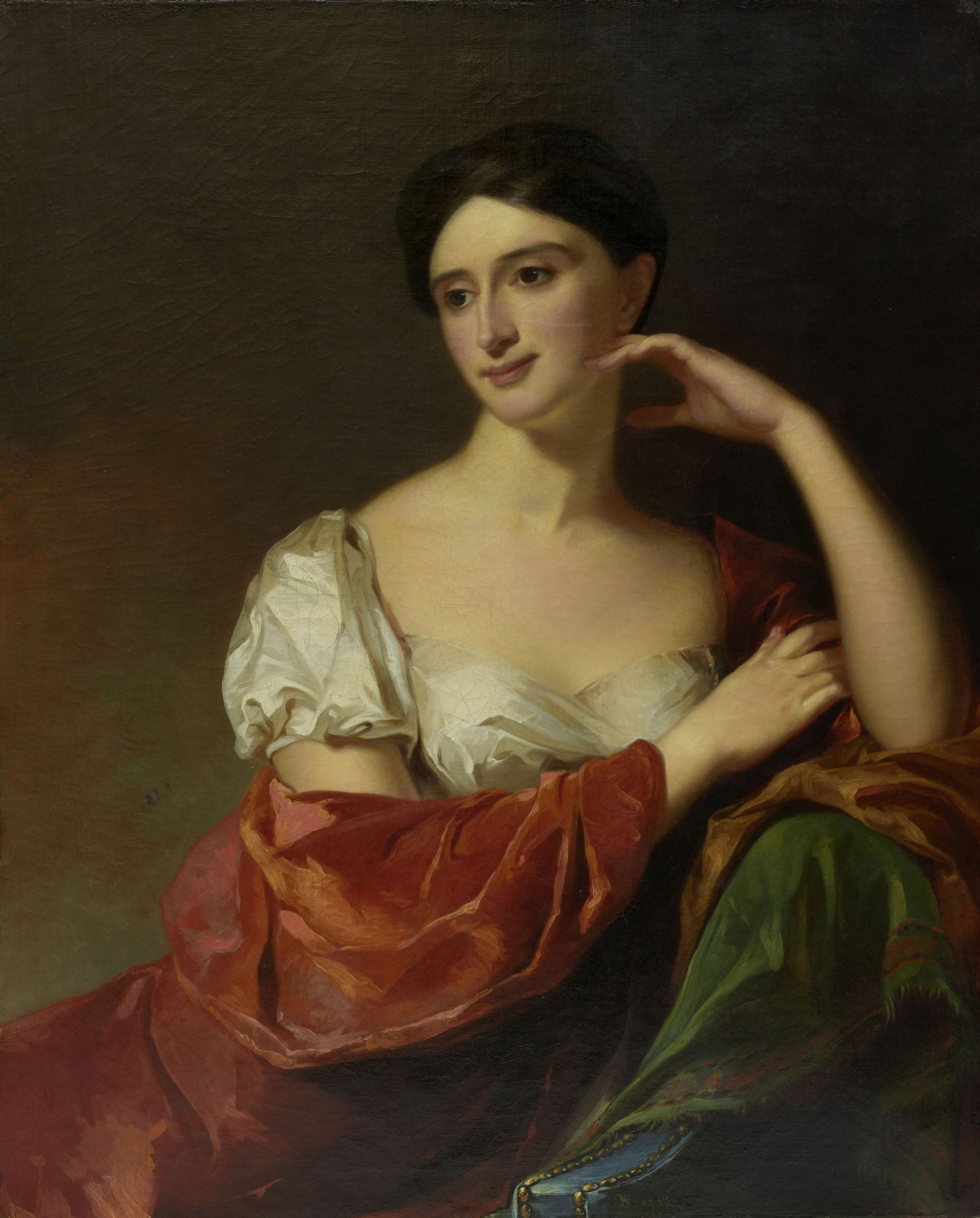
Sarah Cox, portrait by Thomas Sully

He married Sarah Cox, daughter of Colonel John Cox, and they had six children. His son Edward Jenner Coxe, born December 8, 1801, at Philadelphia, also went on to become a medical doctor, receiving his M.D. from the University of Pennsylvania in 1823. Edward married Mary Louisa, daughter of Louis Clapier, of Marseilles, France, and died in New Orleans, September 21, 1862.

Coxe had one of the largest private libraries in the country—about 15,000 volumes. In addition to his medical writings, he also wrote extensively on theological questions, and he reportedly spoke and read nine languages, including Sanskrit. He was a member of the American Philosophical Society held at Philadelphia (elected in 1799), the Batavian Society of Sciences at Harlem, the Royal Medical Society of London, the Royal Society of Sciences of Copenhagen. He took great interest in both St. Andrew's and St. Luke's Episcopal Churches, having been one of the early founders and vestrymen in each: in St. Andrew's, when living at the corner of Ninth and Walnut Streets; in St. Luke's, when residing in the house he built, surrounded by a large garden, at Broad and Pine Streets.

It was in this house that Dr. Coxe died at the age of 90, "never having been sick in his life; never having had a headache; never going to the dentist". He was buried in Woodlands Cemetery.
